= 1979 New England Patriots season =

Season of National Football League team the New England Patriots

- Owner: Billy Sullivan
- General manager: Bucko Kilroy
- Head coach: Ron Erhardt
- Home stadium: Schaefer Stadium

Results
- Record: 9–7
- Division place: 2nd AFC East
- Playoffs: Did not qualify
- All-Pros: G John Hannah (1st team); CB Mike Haynes (2nd team)
- Pro Bowlers: G John Hannah; CB Mike Haynes; WR Stanley Morgan

Uniform

The 1979 New England Patriots season was the franchise's 10th season in the National Football League and 20th overall. The Patriots ended the season with a record of nine wins and seven losses and finished second in the AFC East Division. Ron Erhardt was named the new coach. In their season opener, the Patriots faced the Pittsburgh Steelers on Monday Night as Darryl Stingley returned to Schaffer Stadium. Patriots' fans gave the paralyzed star a long sustained standing ovation. However, the emotion did not carry over as the Pats lost 16–13 in overtime.

The Pats would find themselves at 8–4, as the team featured a more wide-open offense under quarterback Steve Grogan. However, a three-game losing streak ended their playoff chances, as the team settled for a disappointing 9–7 season.

== Offseason ==
=== NFL draft ===
1979 New England Patriots draft
Round	Pick	Player	Position	College	Notes
1	25	Rick Sanford	Cornerback	South Carolina	
2	52	Bob Golic *	Defensive tackle	Notre Dame	
4	106	Eddie Hare	Punter	Tulsa	
5	135	John Zamberlin	Linebacker	Pacific Lutheran	
7	177	Judson Flint	Safety	Memphis	
8	216	Randy Love	Running back	Houston	
9	245	John Spagnola	Tight end	Yale	
Made roster † Pro Football Hall of Fame * Made at least one Pro Bowl during career

=== Undrafted free agents ===
1979 undrafted free agents of note
Player	Position	College
Ron Brown	Defensive back	Brown
Mark Buben	Defensive tackle	Tufts
Kevin Cunningham	Center	Iowa State
Dennis Dent	Wide receiver	UMass
Rob Forbes	Running back	Drake
Bob Hurley	Guard	Holy Cross
Tom Marhefka	Linebacker	Rhode Island
Mike McLaughlin	Center	UMass
Tom McLaughlin	Punter	Iowa

== Personnel ==
=== Staff ===
1979 New England Patriots staff
Front office: President – Billy Sullivan; Vice president – Chuck Sullivan; General manager – Bucko Kilroy; Assistant general manager – Patrick Sullivan; Director of pro scouting – Bill McPeak; Director of college scouting – Mike Holovak; Personnel assistant – Tom Boisture; Personnel assistant – Mike McCarthy; Coaches administrative aide – Rick Buffington; Head coaches: Head coach – Ron Erhardt; Assistant head coach/defensive coordinator/linebackers – Hank Bullough; Offensive coaches: Offensive coordinator/offensive line – Jim Ringo; Quarterbacks – John Polonchek; Offensive backs – Tom Yewcic; Receivers – Raymond Berry	Defensive coaches: Defensive line – Fritz Shurmur; Defensive backs – Billy Kinard; Special teams coaches: Special teams – Gino Cappelletti

=== Roster ===
1979 New England Patriots roster
Quarterbacks (QB): 12 Matt Cavanaugh; 14 Steve Grogan; 17 Tom Owen; Running backs (RB): 44 Don Calhoun; 35 Allan Clark; 23 Horace Ivory; 30 Mosi Tatupu; Wide receivers (WR): 29 Harold Jackson; 86 Stanley Morgan; 88 Carlos Pennywell; 83 Don Westbrook; Tight ends (TE): 82 Al Chandler; 81 Russ Francis; 80 Don Hasselbeck	Offensive linemen (OL): 61 Sam Adams G; 58 Pete Brock; 75 Bob Cryder G; 73 John Hannah G; 74 Shelby Jordan T; 67 Bill Lenkaitis C; 77 Garry Puetz T; Defensive linemen (DL): 85 Julius Adams DE; 64 Richard Bishop DE; 63 Mark Buben NT; 71 Ray Hamilton NT; 72 Mel Lunsford DE; 78 Tony McGee DE	Linebackers (LB): 55 Ray Costict ILB; 51 Bob Golic ILB; 59 Mike Hawkins OLB; 50 Sam Hunt ILB; 52 Steve King OLB; 53 Bill Matthews ILB; 57 Steve Nelson ILB; 56 Rod Shoate OLB; 54 John Zamberlin ILB; Defensive backs (DB): 26 Raymond Clayborn CB; 22 Dick Conn FS; 48 Tim Fox FS; 40 Mike Haynes CB; 34 Prentice McCray SS; 25 Rick Sanford SS; 21 Mark Washington CB; Special teams (ST): 8 Eddie Hare P; 1 John Smith K	Reserve: 27 Doug Beaudoin S (IR); 21 Sidney Brown CB (IR); 39 Sam Cunningham RB (IR); 68 Terry Falcon G (IR); 24 Judson Flint FS (IR); 32 Andy Johnson RB (IR); 62 Dwight Wheeler T (IR); Rookies in italics

== Regular season ==
=== Schedule ===
Week	Date	Opponent	Result	Record	Venue	Attendance
1	September 3	Pittsburgh Steelers	**L** 13–16 (OT)	0–1	Schaefer Stadium	60,978
2	September 9	**New York Jets**	**W** 56–3	1–1	Schaefer Stadium	53,113
3	September 16	at Cincinnati Bengals	**W** 20–14	2–1	Riverfront Stadium	41,805
4	September 23	San Diego Chargers	**W** 27–21	3–1	Schaefer Stadium	60,916
5	October 1	at Green Bay Packers	**L** 14–27	3–2	Lambeau Field	52,842
6	October 7	Detroit Lions	**W** 24–17	4–2	Schaefer Stadium	60,629
7	October 14	at Chicago Bears	**W** 27–7	5–2	Soldier Field	54,128
8	October 21	**Miami Dolphins**	**W** 28–13	6–2	Schaefer Stadium	61,096
9	October 28	at **Baltimore Colts**	**L** 26–31	6–3	Memorial Stadium	41,029
10	November 4	at **Buffalo Bills**	**W** 26–6	7–3	Rich Stadium	67,935
11	November 11	at Denver Broncos	**L** 10–45	7–4	Mile High Stadium	74,379
12	November 18	**Baltimore Colts**	**W** 50–21	8–4	Schaefer Stadium	60,879
13	November 25	**Buffalo Bills**	**L** 13–16 (OT)	8–5	Schaefer Stadium	60,991
14	November 29	at **Miami Dolphins**	**L** 24–39	8–6	Miami Orange Bowl	69,174
15	December 9	at **New York Jets**	**L** 26–27	8–7	Shea Stadium	45,131
16	December 16	Minnesota Vikings	**W** 27–23	9–7	Schaefer Stadium	54,719
Note: Intra-division opponents are in **bold** text.

=== Standings ===
AFC East
	W	L	T	PCT	DIV	CONF	PF	PA	STK
Miami Dolphins^{(3)}	10	6	0	.625	5–3	6–6	341	257	L1
New England Patriots	9	7	0	.563	4–4	6–6	411	326	W1
New York Jets	8	8	0	.500	4–4	5–7	337	383	W3
Buffalo Bills	7	9	0	.438	4–4	5–7	268	279	L3
Baltimore Colts	5	11	0	.313	3–5	4–10	271	351	W1

== Season summary ==
=== Week 4 vs Chargers ===
Week Four: San Diego Chargers (3–0) at New England Patriots (2–1)

Quarter	1	2	3	4	Total
Chargers	0	14	0	7	21
Patriots	17	3	0	7	27

at Schaefer Stadium, Foxborough, Massachusetts

- Date: September 23
- Game time: 1:00 p.m. EST
- Game weather: 55 °F (13 °C)
- Game attendance: 60,916
- TV announcers (NBC): Dick Enberg and Merlin Olsen
- Box Score

Game information

First quarter

- NE – Sam Cunningham 1-yard run (John Smith kick). Patriots 7–0.
- NE – Don Calhoun 10-yard run (John Smith kick). Patriots 14–0.
- NE – John Smith 31-yard field goal. Patriots 17–0.

Second quarter

- NE – John Smith 31-yard field goal. Patriots 20–0.
- SD – John Jefferson 19-yard pass from Dan Fouts (Rolf Benirschke kick). Patriots 20–7.
- SD – Clarence Williams (Rolf Benirschke kick). Patriots 20–14.

Third quarter

- No scoring

Fourth quarter

- NE – Russ Francis 5-yard pass from Steve Grogan (John Smith kick). Patriots 27–14.
- SD – Clarence Williams 1-yard run (Rolf Benirschke kick). Patriots 27–21.

Top passers

- SD – Dan Fouts – 20/34, 200 yards, TD, 2 INT
- NE – Steve Grogan – 13/23, 157 yards, TD, 2 INT

Top rushers

- SD – Clarence Williams – 13 rushes, 34 yards, 2 TD
- NE – Sam Cunningham – 22 rushes, 75 yards, TD

Top receivers

- SD – John Jefferson – 4 receptions, 59 yards, TD
- NE – Russ Francis – 4 receptions, 85 yards, TD

External videos
- San Diego Chargers at New England Patriots, NFL Films highlights

== See also ==
- New England Patriots seasons
