= 1978 New England Patriots season =

Season of National Football League team the New England Patriots

- Owner: Billy Sullivan
- General manager: Chuck Fairbanks
- Head coach: Chuck Fairbanks (suspended by team in week 16, reinstated for playoffs); Hank Bullough (co-interim); Ron Erhardt (co-interim)
- Home stadium: Schaefer Stadium

Results
- Record: 11–5
- Division place: 1st AFC East
- Playoffs: Lost Divisional Playoffs (vs. Oilers) 14–31
- All-Pros: G John Hannah (1st team); T Leon Gray (1st team); TE Russ Francis (2nd team); CB Mike Haynes (2nd team)
- Pro Bowlers: FB Sam Cunningham; TE Russ Francis; T Leon Gray; G John Hannah; CB Mike Haynes

The 1978 New England Patriots season was the franchise's ninth season in the National Football League and 19th overall. They finished the season with a record of eleven wins and five losses, tied for first in the AFC East, and won the tiebreaker over the Miami Dolphins. It was the Patriots' second division title, and the first since 1963, the fourth year of the AFL. In the Divisional Playoffs the Patriots lost to the Houston Oilers 31–14.

New England set a then-NFL record in 1978 for most rushing yards in a single season, with 3,165 yards on the ground. This record would not be broken until the Baltimore Ravens, led by Lamar Jackson, some four decades later. Four players rushed for more than 500 yards each: running back Sam "Bam" Cunningham, 768; running back Andy Johnson, 675; running back Horace Ivory, 693; and quarterback Steve Grogan, 539. The team also picked up an NFL-record 181 rushing first-downs.

== Offseason ==
=== Draft ===
1978 New England Patriots draft
Round	Pick	Player	Position	College	Notes
1	18	Bob Cryder	Guard	Alabama	
2	50	Matt Cavanaugh	Quarterback	Pittsburgh	
3	77	Carlos Pennywell	Wide receiver	Grambling State	
4	102	Dwight Wheeler	Offensive tackle	Tennessee State	
5	129	Bill Matthews	Linebacker	South Dakota State	
6	156	Kem Coleman	Linebacker	Ole Miss	
7	188	Mike Hawkins	Linebacker	Texas A&I	
8	198	Terry Falcon	Guard	Montana	
8	215	Mosi Tatupu *	Fullback	USC	
9	242	Tim Peterson	Linebacker	Arizona State	
10	269	Bryan Ferguson	Defensive back	Miami (FL)	
11	296	Charlie Williams	Linebacker	Florida	
12	328	John Gibney	Center	Colgate	
Made roster * Made at least one Pro Bowl during career

=== Undrafted free agents ===
1978 undrafted free agents of note
Player	Position	College
Tom Birney	Kicker	Michigan State
Paul Denza	Defensive end	Yale
Sam Pfabe	Linebacker	Virginia
Keith Ponder	Defensive back	Northern Michigan
Tom Zwayer	Defensive tackle	Miami (OH)

== Staff ==
1978 New England Patriots staff
Front office: President – Billy Sullivan; Executive Vice President – Chuck Sullivan; Assistant General Manager – Jim Valek; Director of Player Personnel – Bucko Kilroy; Assistant Personnel Director – Mike Hickey; Coaches administrative aide – Ernie Adams; Head coaches: General Manager/head coach – Chuck Fairbanks; Assistant head coach/defensive coordinator/linebackers – Hank Bullough; Offensive coaches: Offensive coordinator/running backs – Ron Erhardt; Quarterbacks – John Polonchek; Receivers – Raymond Berry; Offensive Line – Jim Ringo	Defensive coaches: Defensive Line – Fritz Shurmur; Defensive backs – Charlie Sumner; Special teams coaches: Special teams – Tom Yewcic

== Roster ==
1978 New England Patriots roster
Quarterbacks (QB): 12 Matt Cavanaugh; 14 Steve Grogan; 17 Tom Owen; Running backs (RB): 44 Don Calhoun; 39 Sam Cunningham; 23 Horace Ivory; 32 Andy Johnson; 37 James McAlister; 30 Mosi Tatupu; Wide receivers (WR): 29 Harold Jackson; 86 Stanley Morgan; 88 Carlos Pennywell; 83 Don Westbrook; Tight ends (TE): 81 Russ Francis; 80 Don Hasselbeck	Offensive linemen (OL): 61 Sam Adams G; 58 Pete Brock C; 68 Terry Falcon G; 70 Leon Gray T; 73 John Hannah G; 74 Shelby Jordan T; 67 Bill Lenkaitis C; 66 Bob McKay T; Defensive linemen (DL): 64 Richard Bishop DE; 71 Ray Hamilton NT; 63 Ernie Holmes NT; 72 Mel Lunsford DE; 78 Tony McGee DE; 76 Greg Schaum DE	Linebackers (LB): 55 Ray Costict ILB; 59 Mike Hawkins OLB; 50 Sam Hunt ILB; 52 Steve King OLB; 57 Steve Nelson ILB; 56 Rod Shoate OLB; 54 Steve Zabel OLB; Defensive backs (DB): 27 Doug Beaudoin SS; 21 Sidney Brown CB; 26 Raymond Clayborn CB; 22 Dick Conn FS; 48 Tim Fox FS; 40 Mike Haynes CB; 34 Prentice McCray SS; Special teams (ST): 9 David Posey K; 4 Jerrel Wilson P	Reserve: 85 Julius Adams DE (IR); 65 Greg Boyd DE (IR); 51 Kem Coleman LB (IR); 75 Bob Cryder G (IR); 53 Bill Matthews LB (IR); 2 Mike Patrick P (IR); -- Jim Romaniszyn LB (IR); 1 John Smith K (IR); 84 Darryl Stingley WR (IR); 62 Dwight Wheeler T (IR); Rookies in italics

== Regular season ==
Following a preseason hit in Oakland that paralyzed popular receiver Darryl Stingley for life, the Patriots staggered to a 1–2 start before upsetting the Oakland Raiders on the road. From there the Patriots stormed to win nine of their next 12 games, establishing an NFL record for rushing yards at 3,165. The Patriots clinched their first division title with a 26–24 win over the Buffalo Bills with one game remaining.

=== Schedule ===
Week	Date	Opponent	Result	Record	Venue	Attendance	Game Recap
1	September 3	Washington Redskins	**L** 14–16	0–1	Schaefer Stadium	55,037	Recap
2	September 10	at St. Louis Cardinals	**W** 16–6	1–1	Busch Memorial Stadium	48,233	Recap
3	September 18	**Baltimore Colts**	**L** 27–34	1–2	Schaefer Stadium	57,284	Recap
4	September 24	at Oakland Raiders	**W** 21–14	2–2	Oakland–Alameda County Coliseum	52,904	Recap
5	October 1	San Diego Chargers	**W** 28–23	3–2	Schaefer Stadium	60,781	Recap
6	October 8	Philadelphia Eagles	**W** 24–14	4–2	Schaefer Stadium	61,016	Recap
7	October 15	at Cincinnati Bengals	**W** 10–3	5–2	Riverfront Stadium	48,699	Recap
8	October 22	**Miami Dolphins**	**W** 33–24	6–2	Schaefer Stadium	60,424	Recap
9	October 29	**New York Jets**	**W** 55–21	7–2	Schaefer Stadium	60,585	Recap
10	November 5	at **Buffalo Bills**	**W** 14–10	8–2	Rich Stadium	44,897	Recap
11	November 12	Houston Oilers	**L** 23–26	8–3	Schaefer Stadium	60,356	Recap
12	November 19	at **New York Jets**	**W** 19–17	9–3	Shea Stadium	55,568	Recap
13	November 26	at **Baltimore Colts**	**W** 35–14	10–3	Memorial Stadium	42,828	Recap
14	December 3	at Dallas Cowboys	**L** 10–17	10–4	Texas Stadium	63,263	Recap
15	December 10	**Buffalo Bills**	**W** 26–24	11–4	Schaefer Stadium	59,598	Recap
16	December 18	at **Miami Dolphins**	**L** 3–23	11–5	Miami Orange Bowl	72,071	Recap
Note: Intra-division opponents are in **bold** text.

=== Standings ===
1978 AFC East standings
	W	L	T	PCT	DIV	CONF	PF	PA	STK
New England Patriots^{(2)}	11	5	0	.688	6–2	9–3	358	286	L1
Miami Dolphins^{(4)}	11	5	0	.688	5–3	8–4	372	254	W3
New York Jets	8	8	0	.500	6–2	7–5	359	364	L2
Buffalo Bills	5	11	0	.313	2–6	4–10	302	354	W1
Baltimore Colts	5	11	0	.313	1–7	3–9	240	421	L5

== Postseason ==
=== Schedule ===
Round	Date	Opponent (seed)	Result	Record	Venue	Attendance	Game recap
Divisional	December 31	Houston Oilers (5)	L 14–31	0–1	Schaefer Stadium	60,881	Recap

== Notable games ==
=== Preseason at Oakland Raiders, Stingley paralysis, Acrimony between Fairbanks and owners ===
Tragedy blackened a 21–7 Patriots win over the Raiders when, late in the second quarter, Darryl Stingley jumped after a Steve Grogan throw and was crushed in the jaw by Jack Tatum of the Raiders. The hit paralyzed Stingley for life. The tragedy was also a turning point in Chuck Fairbanks' relationship with the Sullivan family; he was already upset over the previous season when the Sullivans overruled him over new contracts with John Hannah and Leon Gray. With Stingley he had worked out an agreement on a contract extension before the team traveled to Oakland, but the Monday after the game, Stingley's attorney telephoned Chuck Sullivan about the contract and Sullivan said, "We don't have a contract with Stingley." Fairbanks, according to Hannah, "was livid. He decided right then that he wouldn't stay with an organization that treated its folks like that." After the season, Fairbanks resigned and Gray would be traded to Houston.

=== Week 3 ===
Week Three: Baltimore Colts (0–2) at New England Patriots (1–1)

Quarter	1	2	3	4	Total
Colts	0	7	0	27	34
Patriots	6	7	0	14	27

at Schaefer Stadium, Foxboro, Massachusetts

- Date: September 18
- Game time: 9:00 p.m. EST
- Game weather: 58 °F (14 °C)
- TV announcers (ABC): Frank Gifford, Howard Cosell, and Don Meredith
- Pro-Football-Reference.com

Game information

First quarter

- NE – Andy Johnson 1-yard run (kick failed). Patriots 6–0. Drive:

Second quarter

- BAL – Don McCauley 3-yard run (Toni Linhart kick). Colts 7–6. Drive:
- NE – Stanley Morgan 62-yard pass from Steve Grogan (John Smith kick). Patriots 13–7. Drive:

Fourth quarter

- BAL – Roger Carr 54-yard pass from Joe Washington (Toni Linhart kick). Colts 14–13. Drive:
- BAL – Joe Washington 23-yard pass from Bill Troup (kick failed). Colts 20–13. Drive:
- BAL – Roger Carr 67-yard pass from Bill Troup (Toni Linhart kick). Colts 27–13. Drive:
- NE – Steve Grogan 4-yard run (John Smith kick), 3:17. Colts 27–20. Drive: 11 plays, 60 yards.
- NE – Sam Cunningham 1-yard run (John Smith kick), 1:33. Tie 27–27. Drive:
- BAL – Joe Washington 90-yard kickoff return (Toni Linhart kick). Colts 34–27.

Top passers

- BAL – Bill Troup – 10/15, 221 yards, 2 TD, INT
- NE – Steve Grogan – 11/33, 229 yards, TD, 3 INT

Top rushers

- BAL – Joe Washington – 16 rushes, 53 yards
- NE – Andy Johnson – 27 rushes, 109 yards, TD

Top receivers

- BAL – Roger Carr – 6 receptions, 187 yards, 2 TD
- NE – Stanley Morgan – 3 receptions, 125 yards, TD

Hosting the Colts on Monday Night Football at a rain-soaked Schaefer Stadium the Patriots were downed 34–27 on a one-man scoring rampage by the Colts' Joe Washington, who threw a 54-yard touchdown to Roger Carr, caught a 23-yard score from Bill Troup, and after a game-tying Sam Cunningham touchdown run in the fourth returned the ensuing kick 90 yards for the game-winning touchdown.

=== Week 4 ===
Week Four: New England Patriots (1–2) at Oakland Raiders (2-1)

Quarter	1	2	3	4	Total
Patriots	0	7	7	7	21
Raiders	14	0	0	0	14

at Oakland–Alameda County Coliseum • Oakland, California

- Date: September 24
- Game time: 6:00 p.m. PST
- Game weather: 74 °F (23 °C) • Wind 7 mph (11 km/h)
- TV announcers (ABC): Frank Gifford, Howard Cosell, and Don Meredith
- Pro-Football-Reference.com

Game information
First quarter
- OAK - Dave Casper 13-yard pass from Ken Stabler (Errol Mann kick) Raiders 7–0.
- OAK - Arthur Whittington 4-yard run (Errol Mann kick) Raiders 14–0.

Second quarter

- NE – Russ Francis 25-yard pass from Steve Grogan (Nick Lowery kick) Raiders 14-7.

Third quarter

- NE – Horace Ivory 16-yard run (Nick Lowery kick) Tie 14-14.

Fourth quarter

- NE – Sam Cunningham 1-yard run (Nick Lowery kick) Patriots 21-14.

Returning to Oakland nearly six weeks after Darryl Stingley's near-fatal injury, the Patriots rallied from a 14–0 second-quarter gap by forcing three Ken Stabler interceptions and scoring 21 unanswered points by Russ Francis, Horace Ivory, and Sam Cunningham. The team visited Stingley in the Oakland-area hospital where he was still staying and his jovial banter with the team warmed their spirits enormously.

=== Week 9 ===
In a bizarre harbinger of Spygate, the Patriots exploded for eight touchdowns – Steve Grogan threw to Harold Jackson twice (David Posey missed the PAT on Jackson's second score), Stanley Morgan, and Russ Francis, and two rushing scores apiece by Horace Ivory and James McAlister – in a 55–21 slaughter of the Jets. Jets coach Walt Michaels suspected the Patriots were deciphering his coaching staff's codes and that a rival team had tipped off the Patriots to these codes – "This will never happen to us again", Michaels stewed afterward. "I know what they did, but by the time we figured it out, it was too late."

=== Week 10 ===
- TV Network: NBC
- Announcers: Sam Nover and Len Dawson

New England, using a double tight end offense to control the ball in the second half, got past Buffalo on the running of Horace Ivory, who carried the ball 16 times for 128 yards and two touchdowns. His 19-yard touchdown run in the second period and his 5-yard touchdown run in the third period. The Bills try to come back late in the game after they recovered a Patriots fumble and took advantage as Joe Ferguson hooked up with Bob Chandler for a 11-yard touchdown connection. But a failed onsides kick gave the Ball to the Patriots who ran out the clock to secure them a 7th straight victory for the Pats.

=== Week 11 ===
The Patriots' seven-game winning streak crashed to a halt as they stormed to a 23–0 lead in the second quarter but surrendered four unanswered Houston touchdowns (marred by two missed PATs by Toni Fritsch) and a 26–23 Houston win. This would be the last time the Pats blew a 20+ point lead at home until 2025.

=== Week 12 ===
Week Twelve: New England Patriots (8-3) at New York Jets (6-5)

Quarter	1	2	3	4	Total
Patriots	0	10	0	9	19
Jets	7	0	3	7	17

at Shea Stadium, New York, New York

- Date: November 19
- Game time: 1:00 p.m. EST
- Game weather: 49 °F (9.4 °C), wind 14 miles per hour (23 km/h; 12 kn)
- Referee: Pat Haggerty
- TV: NBC
- Pro-Football-Reference.com

Game information
First quarter
- NYJ - Kevin Long 1 yard rush (Pat Leahy kick) Jets 7-0.

Second quarter

- NE - David Posey 47 yard field goal Jets 7-3.
- NE - Horace Ivory 1 yard rush (David Posey kick) Patriots 10-7.

Third quarter

- NYJ - Pat Leahy 45 yard field goal Tie 10-10.

Fourth quarter

- NE - Horace Ivory 11 yard rush (kick failed) Patriots 16-10.
- NYJ - Wesley Walker 56 yard pass from Matt Robinson (Pat Leahy kick) Jets 17-16.
- NE - David Posey 24 yard field goal Patriots 19-17.

A personal foul call against the Jets' Burgess Owens extended a 4th quarter Patriot drive, allowing David Posey to kick a go-ahead 24 yard field goal. The Jets nearly came back, but Pat Leahy's 33 yard field goal attempt sailed wide right with 31 seconds remaining.

=== Week 13 ===
The Patriots crushed the Colts 35–14, sacking Bill Troup eight times while snatching two Troup interceptions (Mike Haynes scored from Baltimore's 36-yard line with the first INT) for good measure. Harold Jackson, Andy Johnson, and Sam Cunningham rushed in touchdowns while Stanley Morgan caught a 75-yard touchdown strike from Steve Grogan.

=== Week 15 ===
Playing in a snowstorm, the Patriots needed a win to clinch the AFC East. They trailed for most of this game as Roland Hooks and Terry Miller of the Bills scored on the ground and Frank Lewis caught a 21-yard touchdown from Joe Ferguson. The Patriots also suffered when linebackers Steve Zabel and Steve Nelson were injured. They rallied, however, behind rushing scores by Sam Cunningham, Steve Grogan, and Horace Ivory and a safety when Tim Fox ran Bills punter Rusty Jackson out of the endzone; Bills coach Chuck Knox allowed a safety because he feared punting out of his team's endzone. In the game's final eight seconds the Bills led 24–23 but David Posey kicked the winning field goal from 21 yards out, clinching a 26–24 win.

=== Week 16 ===
The celebration of the AFC East title was wiped out when coach Chuck Fairbanks, who'd been negotiating a head coaching position with the University of Colorado all season, was suspended just before New England's regular-season wrap-up in Miami on Monday Night Football. Coordinators Hank Bullough and Ron Erhardt took over as co-head coaches for the game. The suspension of Fairbanks and elevation of Bullough and Erhardt took the team, radioman Gil Santos, and the ABC Network's Howard Cosell by surprise. The Patriots were crushed 23–3 by the Dolphins; Steve Grogan injured his knee during the game. Despite the loss the Patriots won the division on tie-breakers over the 11–5 Dolphins and secured a playoff bye.

=== Divisional ===
To the surprise of everyone, Chuck Fairbanks was reinstated as head coach for the playoffs, but by then he had lost the respect of the locker room, and in their very first home playoff game the Patriots were massacred by the Oilers 31–14 behind three Dan Pastorini touchdown throws and an Earl Campbell rushing score. Steve Grogan, unable to push off on his injured knee, threw two interceptions and was knocked out of the game; backup Tom Owen managed one touchdown (a 24-yard strike to Russ Francis) while Harold Jackson caught a 24-yard score from Andy Johnson. Following the game Fairbanks left for good amid long-running acrimony with Billy and Chuck Sullivan; a lawsuit was settled on April 2, 1979, that gave the Patriots $200,000 and made Fairbanks liable if he took another NFL job before 1983, the period when his previous contract was supposed to end.

== See also ==
- New England Patriots seasons
