= 1980 New England Patriots season =

Season of National Football League team the New England Patriots

- Owner: Billy Sullivan
- General manager: Bucko Kilroy
- Head coach: Ron Erhardt
- Home stadium: Schaefer Stadium

Results
- Record: 10–6
- Division place: 2nd AFC East
- Playoffs: Did not qualify
- All-Pros: G John Hannah (1st team); CB Mike Haynes (2nd team); WR Stanley Morgan (2nd team)
- Pro Bowlers: DE Julius Adams; FS Tim Fox; G John Hannah; CB Mike Haynes; WR Stanley Morgan; LB Steve Nelson; K John Smith

Uniform

The 1980 New England Patriots season was the franchise's 11th season in the National Football League and 21st overall. They completed the season with a record of ten wins and six losses and finished second in the AFC East Division. Running back Sam Cunningham held out all season, so the Patriots turned to rookie Vagas Ferguson to carry the bulk of the rushing game. Ferguson responded by breaking the team's rookie rushing record. The Patriots would sit at 6–1 near the midway point and were about to make the playoffs. However, the Pats collapsed and won just two of their next seven and finished with a 10–6 record that saw them fall just short of a wild-card berth.

Bill Parcells, then the linebackers coach with the team, has stated that the players on this Patriots team gave him his famous "Tuna" nickname when he asked, "What do you think I am, Charlie the Tuna?"

== Offseason ==
=== NFL draft ===
1980 New England Patriots draft
Round	Pick	Player	Position	College	Notes
1	14	Roland James	Cornerback	Tennessee	
1	25	Vagas Ferguson	Running back	Notre Dame	
2	45	Larry McGrew	Linebacker	USC	
3	73	Steve McMichael *	Defensive tackle	Texas	
5	124	Doug McDougald	Defensive end	Virginia Tech	
6	160	Preston Brown	Wide receiver	Vanderbilt	
7	180	Tom Kearns	Guard	Kentucky	
8	208	Mike House	Tight end	Pacific	
9	235	Barry Burget	Linebacker	Oklahoma	
10	266	Tom Daniel	Center	Georgia Tech	
11	293	Mike Hubach	Punter	Kansas	
12	320	Jimmy Jordan	Quarterback	Florida State	
Made roster * Made at least one Pro Bowl during career

=== Undrafted free agents ===
1980 undrafted free agents of note
Player	Position	College
Steve Beal	Defensive end	UConn
Paul Collins	Wide receiver	Williams
Angelo Colosimo	Running back	Colgate
Mike Cusumano	Wide receiver	Cincinnati
Ron Day	Running back	Kutztown
James Doughtie	Safety	Norfolk State
Larry Ewald	Running back	Holy Cross
Clint Gaffney	Linebacker	Boston College
Martin Hanna	Linebacker	William Penn
Bernie Hober	Safety	Villanova
John Marzo	Quarterback	Colgate
Ken Startzell	Kicker	Rutgers
Tim Tumpane	Linebacker	Yale
Karl Ulrich	Quarterback	Brockport State

== Staff ==
1980 New England Patriots staff
Front office: President – Billy Sullivan; Executive vice president – Chuck Sullivan; General manager – Bucko Kilroy; Assistant general manager – Patrick Sullivan; Director of college scouting – Mike Holovak; Director of pro scouting – Bill McPeak; Administrative assistant – Rick Buffington; Head coaches: Head coach – Ron Erhardt; Offensive coaches: Offensive coordinator/offensive line – Jim Ringo; Quarterbacks – John Polonchek; Offensive backs – Tom Yewcic; Receivers – Raymond Berry	Defensive coaches: Defensive coordinator/defensive line – Fritz Shurmur; Linebackers – Bill Parcells; Defensive backs – Billy Kinard; Special teams coaches: Special teams – Gino Cappelletti

== Roster ==
1980 New England Patriots roster
Quarterbacks (QB): 12 Matt Cavanaugh; 14 Steve Grogan; 17 Tom Owen; Running backs (RB): 44 Don Calhoun; 35 Allan Clark; 43 Vagas Ferguson; 22 Chuck Foreman; 23 Horace Ivory; 32 Andy Johnson; 30 Mosi Tatupu; Wide receivers (WR): 29 Harold Jackson; 86 Stanley Morgan; 88 Carlos Pennywell; 83 Don Westbrook; Tight ends (TE): 81 Russ Francis; 80 Don Hasselbeck	Offensive linemen (OL): 61 Sam Adams G; 58 Pete Brock C; 75 Bob Cryder G; 73 John Hannah G; 74 Shelby Jordan T; 67 Bill Lenkaitis C; 77 Garry Puetz T; 62 Dwight Wheeler T; Defensive linemen (DL): 85 Julius Adams DE; 64 Richard Bishop DE/NT; 71 Ray Hamilton NT; 72 Mel Lunsford DE; 70 Doug McDougald DE; 78 Tony McGee DE	Linebackers (LB): 51 Bob Golic ILB; 59 Mike Hawkins OLB; 52 Steve King OLB; 53 Bill Matthews ILB; 57 Steve Nelson ILB; 56 Rod Shoate OLB; 54 John Zamberlin ILB; Defensive backs (DB): 26 Raymond Clayborn CB; 28 Bill Currier FS; 48 Tim Fox FS; 40 Mike Haynes CB; 38 Roland James SS; 25 Rick Sanford SS/CB; Special teams (ST): 6 Mike Hubach P; 1 John Smith K	Reserve: 87 Preston Brown WR (IR); 63 Mark Buben DE (IR); 55 Ray Costict LB (IR); 39 Sam Cunningham RB (IR); 50 Larry McGrew LB (IR); 66 Steve McMichael NT (IR); 68 Steve Schindler G (IR); 31 Jimmy Stewart S (IR); Rookies in italics

== Regular season ==
=== Season summary ===
The Patriots scored 441 points in 1980, a team record that stood until the 2007 team surpassed it. For the second straight season, they missed the playoffs by one game.

=== Schedule ===
Week	Date	Opponent	Result	Record	Venue	Attendance
1	September 7	Cleveland Browns	**W** 34–17	1–0	Schaefer Stadium	49,222
2	September 14	Atlanta Falcons	**L** 21–37	1–1	Schaefer Stadium	48,321
3	September 21	at Seattle Seahawks	**W** 37–31	2–1	Kingdome	61,035
4	September 29	Denver Broncos	**W** 23–14	3–1	Schaefer Stadium	59,602
5	October 5	at **New York Jets**	**W** 21–11	4–1	Shea Stadium	53,603
6	October 12	**Miami Dolphins**	**W** 34–0	5–1	Schaefer Stadium	60,377
7	October 19	at **Baltimore Colts**	**W** 37–21	6–1	Memorial Stadium	53,924
8	October 26	at **Buffalo Bills**	**L** 13–31	6–2	Rich Stadium	75,092
9	November 2	**New York Jets**	**W** 34–21	7–2	Schaefer Stadium	60,834
10	November 10	at Houston Oilers	**L** 34–38	7–3	Astrodome	51,524
11	November 16	Los Angeles Rams	**L** 14–17	7–4	Schaefer Stadium	60,609
12	November 23	**Baltimore Colts**	**W** 47–21	8–4	Schaefer Stadium	60,994
13	November 30	at San Francisco 49ers	**L** 17–21	8–5	Candlestick Park	45,254
14	December 8	at **Miami Dolphins**	**L** 13–16 (OT)	8–6	Miami Orange Bowl	63,292
15	December 14	**Buffalo Bills**	**W** 24–2	9–6	Schaefer Stadium	58,324
16	December 21	at New Orleans Saints	**W** 38–27	10–6	Louisiana Superdome	38,277
Note: Intra-division opponents are in **bold** text.

=== Standings ===
AFC East
	W	L	T	PCT	DIV	CONF	PF	PA	STK
^{(3)} Buffalo Bills	11	5	0	.688	4–4	8–4	320	260	W1
New England Patriots	10	6	0	.625	6–2	9–3	441	325	W2
Miami Dolphins	8	8	0	.500	3–5	4–8	266	305	L1
Baltimore Colts	7	9	0	.438	5–3	6–8	355	387	L3
New York Jets	4	12	0	.250	2–6	3–9	302	395	W1

== Notable games ==
- Week 1 vs Browns

Steve Grogan fired for three touchdown passes (including a 10-yard pass to Harold Jackson who caught his 500th career reception) and John Smith kicked three field goals as the New England Patriots shut down the Cleveland Browns offense until late in the game and rolled to a 34-17 victory over the Browns. For the day Grogan completed 17 of 26 passes for 277 yards. It was the Patriots first home opening day win since 1977.

- Week 2 vs Falcons
- Week 3 at Seattle Seahawks:

The game lead tied or changed eight times as Jim Zorn and Steve Grogan combined for 583 passing yards, seven touchdowns, and two picks. Trailing 27–14 after three quarters the Seahawks behind Zorn touchdowns to Steve Largent and Sam McCullum took a 31–30 lead before Grogan found tight end Don Hasselbeck (whose son Matt would quarterback the Seahawks over two decades later) for the game-winning touchdown of a 37–31 final.

- Week 4 vs. Denver Broncos:

The Patriots opened the first of three Monday Night Football appearances on their schedule hosting the Broncos for the fourth time since the AFL-NFL merger. A Matt Robinson touchdown in the first quarter put the Broncos up 7–0, then the game lead changed three times in the next two quarters behind Patriot scores by Vagas Ferguson, Stanley Morgan, and kicker John Smith and an Otis Armstrong touchdown for the Broncos, before the Patriots inched away in the fourth to a 23–14 win. It was the fourth straight win for the home team in the rivalry and would be the Patriots' last win over the Broncos until 1999.

- Week 5 @ New York Jets:

The Patriots edged the Jets 21–11, sacking Richard Todd five times. It had been a rough week leading up to the game for Todd, as he broke the little toe on his left foot after accidentally kicking a table at home, then broke the right little toe after his foot was stepped on by Stan Waldemore on a play-action drill during practice – Waldemore was subbing for Randy Rasmussen after Rasmussen was injured earlier in practice.

- Week 6 vs. Miami Dolphins:

The Patriots and Dolphins had split their season series the previous four seasons, and 1980 proved no different. The Patriots hammered the Dolphins at Schaefer Stadium 34–0 as Don Calhoun and Allan Clark had rushing touchdowns, Steve Grogan and Matt Cavanaugh each had a touchdown throw, and kicker John Smith kicked two field goals. The Dolphins had four fumbles and recovered all four, but also threw four picks.

- Week 7 at Colts
- Week 8 at Bills
Week Eight: New England Patriots (6–1) at Buffalo Bills (5–2)

Quarter	1	2	3	4	Total
Patriots	3	0	10	0	13
Bills	0	14	0	17	31

at Rich Stadium, Orchard Park, New York

- Date: October 26
- Game time: 1:00 p.m. EDT
- Game weather: 41 °F (5 °C)
- Game attendance: 75,092
- Referee: Ben Dreith
- TV announcers (NBC): Charlie Jones and Len Dawson
- Box Score

Game information

First quarter

- NE – John Smith 41-yard field goal. Patriots 3–0.

Second quarter

- BUF – Frank Lewis 14-yard pass from Joe Ferguson (Nick Mike-Mayer kick). Bills 7–3.
- BUF – Frank Lewis 12-yard pass from Joe Ferguson (Nick Mike-Mayer kick). Bills 14–3.

Third quarter

- NE – Russ Francis 26-yard pass from Steve Grogan (John Smith kick). Bills 14–10.
- NE – John Smith 32-yard field goal. Bills 14–13.

Fourth quarter

- BUF – Nick Mike-Mayer 23-yard field goal. Bills 17–13.
- BUF – Joe Cribbs 16-yard run (Nick Mike-Mayer kick). Bills 24–13.
- BUF – Joe Cribbs 5-yard run (Nick Mike-Mayer kick). Bills 31–13.

Top passers

- NE – Steve Grogan – 13/29, 138 yards, TD, 4 INT
- BUF – Joe Ferguson – 12/28, 176 yards, 2 TD, 2 INT

Top rushers

- NE – Don Calhoun – 8 rushes, 24 yards
- BUF – Joe Cribbs – 30 rushes, 118 yards, 2 TD

Top receivers

- NE – Russ Francis – 2 receptions, 32 yards, TD
- BUF – Frank Lewis – 5 receptions, 80 yards, 2 TD

- Week 9 vs Jets
- Week 10 at Houston Oilers

In their second Monday Night Football game the Patriots fell behind 24–6 at halftime as they faced an Oilers squad that included two players who'd haunted the Pats during their Oakland Raiders days – Ken Stabler and Dave Casper. The Patriots managed four touchdowns in the second half and recovered an onside kick late in the fourth quarter, but Grogan was intercepted in the endzone and thus the Oilers had the game 38–34.

- Week 11 vs Rams
- Week 12 vs Colts
- Week 13 at San Francisco 49ers:

Steve Grogan started despite injuries to both knees because backup Matt Cavanaugh (a future Niners backup for Joe Montana) was coming off knee surgery. Grogan was picked off six times in a 21–17 loss and "I got crucified in the newspapers, but no one knew I was playing on two bad knees."

- Week 14 at Miami Dolphins:

The Dolphins got revenge in a 16–13 overtime win at the Miami Orange Bowl. The Patriots clawed to a 13–6 lead in the fourth quarter, then the Dolphins forced overtime with a David Woodley throw to Nat Moore in the fourth. John Smith attempted to kick the game-winning field goal, but had the kick blocked, then Uwe von Schamann of the Dolphins won it with a 23-yard field goal in the extra quarter. The game, though, wound up taking a back seat to the announcement by Howard Cosell that John Lennon had been shot and killed.

- Week 15 vs Bills
- Week 16 vs. New Orleans Saints:

Needing a win and outside help for a playoff berth, the Patriots outdueled the Saints 38–27 behind three Matt Cavanaugh touchdown throws and rushing scores by Don Calhoun and Mosi Tatupu. Running back Jack Holmes threw a touchdown to fellow RB Jimmy Rogers as the Saints clawed to a 10–0 first quarter lead, but the lead was gone before halftime. Archie Manning threw for 301 yards and a score to Wes Chandler against a Patriots organization his sons Peyton and Eli would battle in another time. A Pittsburgh win in the ensuing Monday Night game versus San Diego would have earned the Patriots a wild card, but the Chargers led it wire to wire to clinch the #1 seed in the AFC.

== See also ==
- New England Patriots seasons
