= 1981 New England Patriots season =

Season of National Football League team the New England Patriots

- Owner: Billy Sullivan
- General manager: Bucko Kilroy
- Head coach: Ron Erhardt
- Home stadium: Schaefer Stadium

Results
- Record: 2–14
- Division place: 5th AFC East
- Playoffs: Did not qualify
- All-Pros: G John Hannah (1st team)
- Pro Bowlers: G John Hannah

The 1981 New England Patriots season was the franchise's 12th season in the National Football League and 22nd overall.

Looking to improve on two consecutive winning seasons under head coach Ron Erhardt, including a 10–6 mark in 1980, the Patriots instead regressed significantly and ended the season with a record of two wins and fourteen losses, and finished tied for last in the AFC East Division with the Baltimore Colts, with whom they also tied for the worst record in the league. A porous defensive line and linebacking corps was the chief weakness: in one game against the Steelers the Patriot secondary made 27 of the team's 33 tackles. The 2–14 record resulted in Erhardt losing his job at the end of the season.

The Patriots lost their first four games, and then ten of their last eleven, including the last nine games of the season. Eight of their losses were by margins of seven or fewer points; the largest margin of defeat was only 14 points. The Patriots were defeated in both the first and last games of the season by the Baltimore Colts; the Patriots' bookend losses proved to be Baltimore's only two wins of the 1981 season. It was known that the loser of that last game would have the first pick in the 1982 NFL draft, and the game was nicknamed “The Stupor Bowl.” With the Patriots’ defeat, the team had the first pick, choosing University of Texas defensive end Kenneth Sims, an eventual “draft bust” as first overall pick in the NFL draft. 22 years later, in their Super Bowl XXXVIII-winning season, the Patriots went 14–2, becoming the second franchise in NFL history to have both a 2–14 season and a 14–2 season. (Note: The San Francisco 49ers had 2–14 seasons in 1978 and 1979, and 14–2 seasons in 1989, 1990 and 1992.)

== Offseason ==
=== NFL draft ===
1981 New England Patriots draft
Round	Pick	Player	Position	College	Notes
1	19	Brian Holloway *	Tackle	Stanford	
2	47	Tony Collins *	Running back	East Carolina	
4	102	Don Blackmon	Linebacker	Tulsa	
5	130	Stevan Clark	Defensive tackle	Kansas State	
6	157	Ron Wooten	Guard	North Carolina	
7	185	Ken Toler	Wide receiver	Ole Miss	
8	194	Ken Naber	Placekicker	Stanford	
8	212	Lin Dawson	Tight end	North Carolina State	
11	295	Brian Buckley	Quarterback	Harvard	
12	323	Cris Crissy	Defensive back	Princeton	
Made roster † Pro Football Hall of Fame * Made at least one Pro Bowl during career

=== Undrafted free agents ===
1981 undrafted free agents of note
Player	Position	College
Bill Burke	Running Back	AIC
Mike Bush	Wide receiver	Cal Poly
Rich Camarillo	Punter	Washington
Charles Cassidy	Tackle	Mnsflid St.(PA)
Russ Compton	Center	Indiana
Charles Cook	Defensive end	Miami (FL)
Reggie Eccleston	Wide receiver	Connecticut
Tim Golden	Linebacker	Florida
Colin McCarty	Defensive tackle	Temple
Mark Ross	Punter	NE Oklahoma
Tim Ross	Linebacker	Bowling Green
Tony Sidor	Tight End	Syracuse
Kyle Stevens	Running Back	Washington
Ronald Tate	Running back	North Carolina Central
John Tautolo	Guard	UCLA
Bob Regan	Tackle	Yale
Jim Rill	Center	Dartmouth
Rich Villella	Running Back	Brown
Lea Walker	Running Back	Texas Southern
John Webb	Defensive back	Connecticut
Darrell Wilson	Defensive back	Connecticut

== Staff ==
New England Patriots 1981 staff
Front office: President – Billy Sullivan; Executive vice president – Chuck Sullivan; General manager – Bucko Kilroy; Assistant general manager – Patrick Sullivan; Director of player development – Dick Steinberg; Director of college scouting – Joe Mendes; Director of pro scouting – Bill McPeak; Head coaches: Head coach – Ron Erhardt; Offensive coaches: Offensive coordinator/offensive line – Jim Ringo; Quarterbacks – Babe Parilli; Offensive backs – Bobby Grier; Receivers – Raymond Berry	Defensive coaches: Defensive coordinator/defensive line – Fritz Shurmur; Linebackers – Rick Lantz; Defensive backs – Dick Roach; Special teams coaches: Special teams – Gino Cappelletti

== Roster ==
1981 New England Patriots roster
Quarterbacks (QB): 12 Matt Cavanaugh; 14 Steve Grogan; 17 Tom Owen; Running backs (RB): 44 Don Calhoun; 33 Tony Collins; 39 Sam Cunningham; 43 Vagas Ferguson; 32 Andy Johnson; 30 Mosi Tatupu; Wide receivers (WR): 29 Harold Jackson; 86 Stanley Morgan; 82 Ken Toler; 83 Don Westbrook; Tight ends (TE): 87 Lin Dawson	Offensive linemen (OL): 58 Pete Brock C; 75 Bob Cryder G; 73 John Hannah G; 76 Brian Holloway T; 74 Shelby Jordan T; 67 Bill Lenkaitis C; 77 Garry Puetz G; 62 Dwight Wheeler T; Defensive linemen (DL): 85 Julius Adams DE; 64 Richard Bishop NT; 63 Mark Buben DE; 71 Ray Hamilton NT; 66 John Lee DE; 78 Tony McGee DE	Linebackers (LB): 55 Don Blackmon OLB; 51 Bob Golic ILB; 59 Mike Hawkins OLB; 52 Steve King OLB; 53 Bill Matthews ILB; 57 Steve Nelson ILB; 56 Rod Shoate OLB; 54 John Zamberlin ILB; Defensive backs (DB): 26 Raymond Clayborn CB; 47 Paul Dombroski CB; 48 Tim Fox FS; 40 Mike Haynes CB; 38 Roland James CB/SS; 22 Keith Lee CB; 25 Rick Sanford SS; Special teams (ST): 3 Rich Camarillo P; 1 John Smith K	Reserve: -- Preston Brown WR (IR); 35 Allan Clark RB (IR); 65 Stevan Clark DE (IR); 97 Charles Cook DE (IR); 23 Kevin Donnalley S (IR); 81 Russ Francis TE (DNR); 93 Tim Golden LB (Left squad); 80 Don Hasselbeck TE (IR); 50 Larry McGrew LB (IR); 88 Carlos Pennywell WR (IR); 70 John Tautolo G (IR); 34 Rick Villella RB (IR); 61 Ron Wooten G (IR); 95 Gary Wright TE (IR); Rookies in italics

== Season summary ==
=== Schedule ===
Week	Date	Opponent	Result	Record	Venue	Attendance
1	September 6	**Baltimore Colts**	**L** 28–29	0–1	Schaefer Stadium	49,572
2	September 13	at Philadelphia Eagles	**L** 3–13	0–2	Veterans Stadium	71,089
3	September 21	Dallas Cowboys	**L** 21–35	0–3	Schaefer Stadium	60,311
4	September 27	at Pittsburgh Steelers	**L** 21–27 (OT)	0–4	Three Rivers Stadium	53,344
5	October 4	Kansas City Chiefs	**W** 33–17	1–4	Schaefer Stadium	55,931
6	October 11	at **New York Jets**	**L** 24–28	1–5	Shea Stadium	55,093
7	October 18	Houston Oilers	**W** 38–10	2–5	Schaefer Stadium	60,474
8	October 25	at Washington Redskins	**L** 22–24	2–6	RFK Stadium	50,394
9	November 1	at Oakland Raiders	**L** 17–27	2–7	Oakland–Alameda County Coliseum	44,246
10	November 8	**Miami Dolphins**	**L** 27–30 (OT)	2–8	Schaefer Stadium	60,436
11	November 15	**New York Jets**	**L** 6–17	2–9	Schaefer Stadium	45,342
12	November 22	at **Buffalo Bills**	**L** 17–20	2–10	Rich Stadium	71,593
13	November 29	St. Louis Cardinals	**L** 20–27	2–11	Schaefer Stadium	39,946
14	December 6	at **Miami Dolphins**	**L** 14–24	2–12	Miami Orange Bowl	50,421
15	December 13	**Buffalo Bills**	**L** 10–19	2–13	Schaefer Stadium	42,549
16	December 20	at **Baltimore Colts**	**L** 21–23	2–14	Memorial Stadium	17,073
Note: Intra-division opponents are in **bold** text.

=== Standings ===
AFC East
	W	L	T	PCT	DIV	CONF	PF	PA	STK
Miami Dolphins^{(2)}	11	4	1	.719	5–2–1	8–3–1	345	275	W4
New York Jets^{(4)}	10	5	1	.656	6–1–1	8–5–1	355	287	W2
Buffalo Bills^{(5)}	10	6	0	.625	6–2	9–3	311	276	L1
Baltimore Colts	2	14	0	.125	2–6	2–10	259	533	W1
New England Patriots	2	14	0	.125	0–8	2–10	322	370	L9

== See also ==
- List of New England Patriots seasons
