= 1976 New England Patriots season =

Season of National Football League team the New England Patriots

- Owner: Billy Sullivan
- General manager: Chuck Fairbanks
- Head coach: Chuck Fairbanks
- Home stadium: Schaefer Stadium

Results
- Record: 11–3
- Division place: 2nd AFC East
- Playoffs: Lost Divisional Playoffs (at Raiders) 21–24
- All-Pros: G John Hannah (1st team); TE Russ Francis (2nd team); CB Mike Haynes (2nd team)
- Pro Bowlers: TE Russ Francis; T Leon Gray; G John Hannah; CB Mike Haynes

The 1976 New England Patriots season was the franchise's seventh season in the National Football League and 17th overall.

After a nine-year stretch in which they posted just one season at .500 amid eight losing years, the Patriots turned around their fortunes, going 11–3. It marked their first winning season as an NFL team (their last winning season came in 1966 in the AFL). New England had gone 3–11 the previous season, and was considered a "Cinderella team" in 1976. Coach Chuck Fairbanks was named NFL Coach of the Year, and cornerback Mike Haynes was named NFL Rookie of the Year.

The 1976 Patriots rushed for a total of 2,957 yards (averaging five yards per carry) and scored 376 points, both second-best in the league. The 2,957 yards rushing were the fifth-highest total in NFL history at the time. The team's 5.0 yards per carry was the best in the NFL and remains higher than all Super Bowl champions except the 1973 Miami Dolphins whose own run game was 5.0 yards per carry. The Patriots also led the league in takeaways at 50, and finished third in the league in turnover differential at plus-14.

The Patriots made their second playoff appearance and first since 1963, but lost to the eventual Super Bowl champion Oakland Raiders 24–21 in the first round of the NFL playoffs. The Patriots held a four-point lead in the fourth quarter, but a controversial roughing the passer penalty on defensive tackle Ray Hamilton late in the game dimmed their hopes of defeating the Raiders again.

Early in the season in week four, the Patriots handed the Raiders their only loss of the season, a 48–17 rout at Foxboro.

Despite the playoff loss, the team has been considered one of the most talented in Patriots history; in 2004, Patriots head coach Bill Belichick, who was an assistant coach in 1976 for the Detroit Lions (who defeated the Patriots), called this Patriots team "loaded", a "who's who team."

After the season, offensive line coach Red Miller was hired as head coach of the Denver Broncos. In his first season, he led them to the AFC's best record (12–2), their first-ever postseason appearance, and the Super Bowl.

== Offseason ==
=== 1976 expansion draft ===
New England Patriots selected during the expansion draft
Round	Overall	Name	Position	Expansion team
0	0	Neil Graff	Quarterback	Seattle Seahawks
0	0	Durwood Keeton	Safety	Tampa Bay Buccaneers
0	0	Kerry Marbury	Running back	Seattle Seahawks

=== NFL draft ===
1976 New England Patriots draft
Round	Pick	Player	Position	College	Notes
1	5	Mike Haynes * ^{†}	Cornerback	Arizona State	
1	12	Pete Brock	Center	Colorado	
1	21	Tim Fox *	Safety	Ohio State	
2	35	Ike Forte	Running back	Arkansas	
Made roster † Pro Football Hall of Fame * Made at least one Pro Bowl during career

== Staff ==
1976 New England Patriots staff
Front office: President – Billy Sullivan; Executive vice president – Chuck Sullivan; Assistant general manager – Jim Valek; Director of player personnel – Bucko Kilroy; Personnel assistant – Tom Boisture; Personnel assistant – Mike Hickey; Personnel assistant – George McGuane Jr.; Personnel assistant – Tony Razzano; Head coaches: General manager/head coach – Chuck Fairbanks; Assistant head coach/defensive line – Hank Bullough; Offensive coaches: Quarterbacks – John Polonchek; Running backs – Ron Erhardt; Receivers – Ray Perkins; Offensive line – Red Miller	Defensive coaches: Inside linebackers – Charlie Sumner; Outside linebackers – Rollie Dotsch; Defensive backs – Larrye Weaver; Special teams coaches: Special teams – Tom Yewcic

== Roster ==
1976 New England Patriots roster
Quarterbacks (QB): 14 Steve Grogan; 17 Tom Owen; Running backs (RB): 44 Don Calhoun; 39 Sam Cunningham; 38 Ike Forte; 32 Andy Johnson; 35 Jess Phillips; Wide receivers (WR): 88 Marlin Briscoe; 82 Steve Burks; 84 Darryl Stingley; 18 Randy Vataha; Tight ends (TE): 87 Al Chandler; 81 Russ Francis	Offensive linemen (OL): 61 Sam Adams G; 58 Pete Brock C; 70 Leon Gray T; 73 John Hannah G; 67 Bill Lenkaitis C; 66 Bob McKay T; 77 Tom Neville T; 63 Fred Sturt G; Defensive linemen (DL): 85 Julius Adams DE; 64 Richard Bishop NT; 71 Ray Hamilton NT; 72 Mel Lunsford DE; 78 Tony McGee DE; 60 David Tipton NT	Linebackers (LB): 59 Pete Barnes OLB; 50 Sam Hunt ILB; 52 Steve King OLB; 51 Donnie Thomas ILB; 90 George Webster ILB; 54 Steve Zabel OLB; Defensive backs (DB): 21 Joe Blahak CB; 22 Dick Conn FS; 48 Tim Fox FS; 29 Willie Germany SS; 40 Mike Haynes CB; 24 Bob Howard CB; 34 Prentice McCray SS; Special teams (ST): 2 Mike Patrick P; 1 John Smith K	Reserve: 27 Doug Beaudoin S (IR); 65 Greg Boyd DE (IR); 62 Steve Corbett G (IR); 76 Pete Cusick NT (IR); 74 Craig Hanneman DT (PUP); -- Shelby Jordan T (Susp.); 75 Arthur Moore NT (IR); 57 Steve Nelson LB (IR); 53 Jim Romaniszyn LB (IR); 25 Deac Sanders CB (IR); 56 Rod Shoate LB (IR); Rookies in italics

== Preseason ==
Week	Date	Opponent	Result	Record	Venue	Attendance
1	August 1	New York Giants	W 13–7 (OT)	1–0	Schaefer Stadium	30,032
2	August 6	vs. San Diego Chargers	L 17–26	1–1	Oklahoma Memorial Stadium	23,800
3	August 15	Green Bay Packers	L 14–16	1–2	Schaefer Stadium	30,552
4	August 21	at Atlanta Falcons	W 28–17	2–2	Atlanta–Fulton County Stadium	23,495
5	August 29	at Cleveland Browns	L 27–30	2–3	Cleveland Municipal Stadium	36,016
6	September 5	Philadelphia Eagles	W 20–7	3–3	Schaefer Stadium	32,254

== Schedule ==
Week	Date	Opponent	Result	Record	Venue	Attendance	Game Recap
1	September 12	**Baltimore Colts**	**L** 13–27	0–1	Schaefer Stadium	43,512	Recap
2	September 19	**Miami Dolphins**	**W** 30–14	1–1	Schaefer Stadium	46,053	Recap
3	September 26	at Pittsburgh Steelers	**W** 30–27	2–1	Three Rivers Stadium	47,379	Recap
4	October 3	Oakland Raiders	**W** 48–17	3–1	Schaefer Stadium	61,068	Recap
5	October 10	at Detroit Lions	**L** 10–30	3–2	Pontiac Silverdome	60,174	Recap
6	October 18	**New York Jets**	**W** 41–7	4–2	Schaefer Stadium	50,883	Recap
7	October 24	at **Buffalo Bills**	**W** 26–22	5–2	Rich Stadium	45,144	Recap
8	October 31	at **Miami Dolphins**	**L** 3–10	5–3	Miami Orange Bowl	52,863	Recap
9	November 7	**Buffalo Bills**	**W** 20–10	6–3	Schaefer Stadium	61,157	Recap
10	November 14	at **Baltimore Colts**	**W** 21–14	7–3	Memorial Stadium	58,226	Recap
11	November 21	at **New York Jets**	**W** 38–24	8–3	Shea Stadium	49,983	Recap
12	November 28	Denver Broncos	**W** 38–14	9–3	Schaefer Stadium	61,128	Recap
13	December 5	New Orleans Saints	**W** 27–6	10–3	Schaefer Stadium	53,592	Recap
14	December 12	at Tampa Bay Buccaneers	**W** 31–14	11–3	Tampa Stadium	41,517	Recap
Note: Intra-division opponents are in **bold** text.

=== Post-season schedule ===
Round	Date	Opponent (seed)	Result	Record	Venue	Attendance	Game recap
Divisional	December 18	Oakland Raiders (1)	**L** 21–24	0–1	Oakland–Alameda County Coliseum	53,045	Recap

== Game summaries ==
- August 30 Monday Night Football (preseason) at Cleveland Browns:

The Patriots fell 30–27 in a Monday Night preseason game; rookie cornerback Michael Haynes ran back a punt but began celebrating at the five-yard line and was hit and fumbled; Darryl Stingley grabbed the fumble and scored. Entering the season the Patriots had never scored on a punt return in any game. The loss was the third of the six-game preseason.

- September 12 vs. Baltimore Colts:

Four Steve Grogan interceptions and a fumble doomed the Patriots as the “Shake & Bake” Colts ran roughshod at Schaefer Stadium 27–13, this despite the sacking of Colts quarterback Bert Jones for 40 yards and 179 rushing yards by the Patriots.

- September 19 vs. Miami Dolphins:

The Pats rebounded with 278 rushing yards and four touchdowns (two rushing scores by Andy Johnson, a Grogan rushing score, and a four-yard toss to Russ Francis) in a 30–14 rout of Miami. Bob Griese had one touchdown throw and three interceptions.

- September 26 at Pittsburgh Steelers:

Forcing six Steeler fumbles in heavy rain, the Patriots wiped out a 20–9 third-quarter gap as Steve Grogan threw to Russ Francis and Darryl Stingley and ran in a touchdown for 21 second-half points. Don Calhoun's fumble in the final four minutes led to a Bradshaw touchdown, and after forcing another punt with 1:29 to go Bradshaw nearly fumbled away the ball but converted two first downs requiring 25 or more yards. With three seconds to go Roy Gerela missed a field goal and the Patriots had an upset 30–27 win.

- October 3 vs. Oakland Raiders
Oakland Raiders (2–1) at New England Patriots (2–1)

Quarter	1	2	3	4	Total
Raiders	0	10	0	7	17
Patriots	7	14	14	13	48

at Schaefer Stadium • Foxboro, Massachusetts

- Date: October 3
- Game time: 1:00 p.m. EDT
- Game weather: 60 °F (16 °C) • Wind 10
- Pro-Football-Reference.com

Game information

Raiders

- Ken Stabler
  20/35, 225 Yds, TD, INT
- Mark van Eeghen
  8 Rush, 34 Yds
- Dave Casper
  12 Rec, 136 Yds

Patriots

- Steve Grogan
  10/14, 165 Yds, 3 TD, INT
- Sam Cunningham
  21 Rush, 101 Yds
  5 Rec, 94 Yds

The Raiders suffered their only loss of the season in a 48–17 slaughter by the Patriots. Ken Stabler had a touchdown throw to Fred Biletnikoff but was sacked four times while Steve Grogan ran wild with three touchdown throws (to Darryl Stingley and Marlin Briscoe) and two rushing scores; Andy Johnson and Jess Phillips rushed in additional touchdowns. During the third quarter a Raiders touchdown was twice wiped out on penalties and the drive ended in a Stabler sack on third-and-26.

Scoring summary

Quarter	Time	Drive			Team	Scoring information	Score	
Quarter	Time	Plays	Yards	TOP	Team	Scoring information	OAK	NE
1					Patriots	Johnson 2-yard touchdown run, Smith kick good	0	7
2					Patriots	Stingley 21-yard touchdown reception from Grogan, Smith kick good	0	14
2					Raiders	Biletnikoff 15-yard touchdown reception from Stabler, Steinfort kick good	7	14
2					Patriots	Briscoe 16-yard touchdown reception from Grogan, Smith kick good	7	21
2					Raiders	44-yard field goal by Steinfort	10	21
3					Patriots	Stingley 15-yard touchdown reception from Grogan, Smith kick good	10	28
3					Patriots	Grogan 2-yard touchdown run, Smith kick good	10	35
4					Patriots	Grogan 10-yard touchdown run, Smith kick good	10	42
4					Patriots	Phillips 11-yard touchdown run, Smith kick no good	10	48
4					Raiders	Rae 1-yard touchdown run, Steinfort kick good	17	48
"TOP" = time of possession. For other American football terms, see Glossary of American football.							17	48

- October 10 at Detroit Lions:

The Patriots never got on track as Grogan threw five picks and the Lions, led by running back Horace King and quarterback Greg Landry, stampeded the Patriots 30–10. One of the members of the Lions staff in this game was assistant special teams coach Bill Belichick, who introduced a two tight-end set on Detroit's offense that was rare for the NFL at the time.

- October 18 Monday Night Football vs. NY Jets:

The Patriots despite ten penalties exploded to 330 rushing yards (103 of them with a touchdown by Steve Grogan; Grogan said years later the score came after botching what was supposed to be a hand off to Sam Cunningham) as they annihilated the Jets 41–7. Alex Karras (whose grandnephew Ted would be drafted by the Patriots in 2016) was working the ABC Sports booth and read aloud Jets coach Lou Holtz's fight song for the team, a reworked version of the US Army's original march The Caissons Go Rolling Along.

- October 24 @ Buffalo Bills:

The Patriots posted their first win over the Bills since 1971 as the two teams combined for nine turnovers, 125 yards in penalties, and 586 yards of offense in the 26-22 New England win. Sam Cunningham and O. J. Simpson combined for 229 rushing yards.

- Halloween @ Miami Dolphins:

Despite 130 rushing yards from five Patriots backs New England fell at Miami 10–3; all scoring took place in the second quarter as Jim Mandich accounted for the game's only touchdown. The Patriots were also penalized eleven times for 80 yards.

- November 7 vs. Buffalo Bills:

Mike Haynes became the first Patriot to ever return a punt for a touchdown as he fielded a second-quarter punt at his 11 and stormed to the Buffalo endzone. The Patriots won 20–10 as Sam Cunningham rushed for 141 yards and a score while Joe Ferguson of the Bills threw four picks; the Bills also fumbled four times while the Patriots coughed up five turnovers (three fumbles and two INTs). O. J. Simpson threw a punch at Mel Lunsford and both players were ejected after the ensuing fight.

- November 14 at Baltimore Colts:

Battling for the division lead, the Colts and Patriots combined for 35 first-half points. In the first quarter Roger Carr caught a 22-yard pass from Bert Jones for the Colts while Al Chandler caught a two-yarder from Steve Grogan. Grogan ran in two second-quarter touchdowns and Don McCauley ran in a score for a 21–14 Patriots lead at the half. The two defenses then shut each other out, as Jones was picked off twice by Mike Haynes and sacked five times in total; Lydell Mitchell was limited to 52 rushing yards and the Patriots held on for the 21–14 win.

- November 21 at New York Jets:

The Jets hosted the Patriots at Shea Stadium and raced to a 10–0 lead in the first quarter behind a Pat Leahy field goal and a Greg Buttle fumble-return score, but the Patriots behind Steve Grogan throws to Andy Johnson and Darryl Stingley took a 14–10 lead entering the second quarter. From there the game collapsed for the 3–7 Jets as Joe Namath threw six interceptions; Mike Haynes grabbed three and Tim Fox had one, while Prentice McCray ran in two (totalling 118 yards) for touchdowns. With Sam Cunningham injured Don Calhoun became the workhorse back for New England, rushing for 109 yards. Namath was benched in the fourth quarter and Richard Todd took over; he threw a touchdown to Clark Gaines but was later picked off by Bob Howard. Grogan threw for just 83 yards and three scores as the Patriots routed the Jets 38–24.

- November 28 vs. Denver Broncos:

The Patriots amassed their highest rushing yardage of the year as Don Calhoun (177 yards), Andy Johnson, and Ike Forte ground up 332 yards on the ground. Mike Haynes also returned a punt 62 yards for a touchdown as the Patriots sacked Denver's quarterbacks nine times, led 31–0 at the half, and cruised to a 38–14 final.

- December 5 vs. New Orleans Saints:

With Archie Manning out for the year the Saints wound up using two quarterbacks (including ex-Bear Bobby Douglass) but managed only 236 total yards vs. 220 rushing yards from the Patriots led by Don Calhoun's 113 yards. In winning 27-6 Steve Grogan completed only nine of 23 passes but two of them were touchdowns, one to Al Chandler, subbing for injured Russ Francis. The win was the 100th career victory in the franchise's history.

- December 12 @ Tampa Bay Buccaneers:

Steve Grogan had his worst passing day of the season with just 40 yards in the air and a pick amid just four completions in 14 attempts. Six Patriots backs led by Andy Johnson rushed for 260 yards and three touchdowns while Sam Hunt picked off Steve Spurrier and ran back 68-yard touchdown. The game ended Tampa's winless first ever season.

- December 18 at Oakland Raiders:

The 1976 AFC Divisional Playoffs. This would become the infamous "Ben Dreith Game" as officiating became a major controversy with numerous questionable penalties. Bill Lenkaitis had not been flagged for holding all season yet was flagged three times in this game. No penalty was called when George Atkinson of the Raiders hammered Russ Francis in the facemask and broke his nose; Steve Zabel popped Francis' nose back into place. There was also controversy over a Sam Cunningham run in the final five minutes of the fourth quarter where he went out of bounds; John Hannah claimed the sideline official moved the first down marker just before Cunningham went out of bounds, denying him a first down. On the play following this Cunningham run, on 3rd and 1 at the Raiders 28-yard line, Steve Grogan changed the snap count to draw the Raiders offsides, but the Raiders were barking out dummy snap counts themselves and Hannah, Leon Gray, and Pete Brock all jumped offsides ("I should have known better", Grogan said afterward). On the next play (3rd and 6) Grogan threw to Russ Francis but Francis could not raise his arms because of holding by the Raiders Phil Villapiano, holding so blatant that according to Francis, "(he left) bruise marks on my arm....when I saw Phil at the Pro Bowl that year, he came right out and told me he had done it." The Patriots missed the ensuing field goal attempt and the Raiders took possession. In the final minute of the fourth quarter Raymond Hamilton of the Patriots was flagged for roughing the passer against Ken Stabler of the Raiders on a 3rd-and-18 play, even though replays showed no roughing; Dreith said the call was made because Hamilton had hit Stabler's helmet, but replays showed Stabler ducking away from Hamilton. Despite Patriot protests (Hamilton was flagged for unsportsmanlike conduct for his protests) the call stood. The Patriots stopped the Raiders on 3rd and 1 near the goal line but another personal foul penalty (this one on Prentice McCray) extended the Raiders drive, and on second and goal at the Patriot 1-yard line Stabler ran in the game-winning touchdown with ten seconds left in a 24–21 Raiders win. Patriot protests over Dreith's call were such that Dreith was not assigned to work any games involving the Patriots until 1980.

=== Standings ===
AFC East
	W	L	T	PCT	DIV	CONF	PF	PA	STK
Baltimore Colts^{(2)}	11	3	0	.786	7–1	11–1	417	246	W1
New England Patriots^{(4)}	11	3	0	.786	6–2	10–2	376	236	W6
Miami Dolphins	6	8	0	.429	5–3	6–6	263	264	L1
New York Jets	3	11	0	.214	2–6	3–9	169	383	L4
Buffalo Bills	2	12	0	.143	0–8	2–10	245	363	L10
