= 1977 New England Patriots season =

Season of National Football League team the New England Patriots

- Owner: Billy Sullivan
- General manager: Chuck Fairbanks
- Head coach: Chuck Fairbanks
- Home stadium: Schaefer Stadium

Results
- Record: 9–5
- Division place: 3rd AFC East
- Playoffs: Did not qualify
- All-Pros: G John Hannah (2nd team); CB Mike Haynes (2nd team)
- Pro Bowlers: TE Russ Francis; CB Mike Haynes

The 1977 New England Patriots season was the franchise's eighth season in the National Football League and 18th overall. The Patriots struggled to a 5–4 record and trailed the Baltimore Colts by three games and the Miami Dolphins by two games after losing 17–5 to the Dolphins. Beginning November 20th, the Patriots won four straight allowing no more than 10 points. While they won the rematch with Miami, a Baltimore win on December 11th would have actually helped them in their quest to win the division crown, but Detroit won 13–10 on a late blocked punt, and New England then needed help with a Buffalo win over Miami. That did not happen as the Dolphins rolled to a 31–14 win to eliminate the Patriots, who ended the season with a record of 9–5 and finished third in the AFC East Division, after a 30–24 loss in the final game to the Colts.

== Draft ==
1977 New England Patriots draft
Round	Pick	Player	Position	College	Notes
1	16	Raymond Clayborn *	Defensive back	Texas	
1	25	Stanley Morgan *	Wide receiver	Tennessee	
2	44	Horace Ivory	Running back	Oklahoma	
2	52	Don Hasselbeck	Tight end	Colorado	
3	82	Sidney Brown	Defensive back	Oklahoma	Played with the Patriots in 1978
4	109	Gerald Skinner	Tackle	Arkansas	
7	192	Ken Smith	Wide receiver	Arkansas–Pine Bluff	
8	219	Brad Benson *	Tackle	Penn State	
9	249	Jerry Vogele	Linebacker	Michigan	
10	276	John Rasmussen	Tackle	Wisconsin	
10	279	Giles Alexander	Defensive end	Tulsa	
11	303	Ray Costict	Linebacker	Mississippi State	
12	333	Dave Preston	Running back	Bowling Green	
Made roster * Made at least one Pro Bowl during career

== Staff ==
1977 New England Patriots staff
Front office: President – Billy Sullivan; Executive vice president – Chuck Sullivan; Assistant general manager – Jim Valek; Director of player personnel – Bucko Kilroy; Coaches administrative aide – Ernie Adams; Personnel assistant – Tom Boisture; Personnel assistant – Mike Holovak; Personnel assistant – Marv Sunderland; Personnel assistant – Tony Razzano; Head coaches: General manager/head coach – Chuck Fairbanks; Assistant head coach/defensive coordinator/line – Hank Bullough; Offensive coaches: Offensive coordinator/running backs – Ron Erhardt; Quarterbacks – John Polonchek; Receivers – Ray Perkins; Offensive line – Leon McLaughlin	Defensive coaches: Linebackers – Charlie Sumner; Defensive backs – Dick Walker; Special teams coaches: Special teams – Tom Yewcic

== Roster ==
1977 New England Patriots roster
Quarterbacks (QB): 14 Steve Grogan; 17 Tom Owen; Running backs (RB): 44 Don Calhoun; 39 Sam Cunningham; 38 Ike Forte; 23 Horace Ivory; 35 Jess Phillips; Wide receivers (WR): 82 Steve Burks; 86 Stanley Morgan; 84 Darryl Stingley; 83 Don Westbrook; Tight ends (TE): 87 Al Chandler; 81 Russ Francis; 80 Don Hasselbeck	Offensive linemen (OL): 61 Sam Adams G; 58 Pete Brock G/C; 70 Leon Gray T; 73 John Hannah G; 74 Shelby Jordan T; 67 Bill Lenkaitis C; 66 Bob McKay T; 77 Tom Neville T; 63 Fred Sturt G; Defensive linemen (DL): 85 Julius Adams DE; 64 Richard Bishop NT; 65 Greg Boyd DE; 71 Ray Hamilton NT; 72 Mel Lunsford DE; 78 Tony McGee DE	Linebackers (LB): 59 Pete Barnes OLB; 55 Ray Costict ILB; 50 Sam Hunt ILB; 52 Steve King OLB; 57 Steve Nelson ILB; 56 Rod Shoate OLB; 54 Steve Zabel OLB; Defensive backs (DB): 27 Doug Beaudoin SS; 26 Raymond Clayborn CB; 22 Dick Conn FS; 48 Tim Fox FS; 40 Mike Haynes CB; 24 Bob Howard CB; 34 Prentice McCray SS; Special teams (ST): 2 Mike Patrick P; 1 John Smith K	Reserve: 21 Sidney Brown CB (IR); 62 Steve Corbett G (Ret.); 76 Pete Cusick NT (IR); 32 Andy Johnson RB (IR); 53 Jim Romaniszyn LB (IR); 51 Jerry Vogele LB (IR); Rookies in italics

== Regular season ==
=== Schedule ===
Week	Date	Opponent	Result	Record	Venue	Attendance	Game Recap
1	September 18	Kansas City Chiefs	**W** 21–17	1–0	Schaefer Stadium	58,185	Recap
2	September 26	at Cleveland Browns	**L** 27–30 (OT)	1–1	Cleveland Municipal Stadium	76,418	Recap
3	October 2	at **New York Jets**	**L** 27–30	1–2	Shea Stadium	38,227	Recap
4	October 9	Seattle Seahawks	**W** 31–0	2–2	Schaefer Stadium	45,927	Recap
5	October 16	at San Diego Chargers	**W** 24–20	3–2	San Diego Stadium	50,327	Recap
6	October 23	**Baltimore Colts**	**W** 17–3	4–2	Schaefer Stadium	60,958	Recap
7	October 30	**New York Jets**	**W** 24–13	5–2	Schaefer Stadium	61,042	Recap
8	November 6	**Buffalo Bills**	**L** 14–24	5–3	Schaefer Stadium	60,263	Recap
9	November 13	at **Miami Dolphins**	**L** 5–17	5–4	Miami Orange Bowl	67,502	Recap
10	November 20	at **Buffalo Bills**	**W** 20–7	6–4	Rich Stadium	27,598	Recap
11	November 27	Philadelphia Eagles	**W** 14–6	7–4	Schaefer Stadium	57,893	Recap
12	December 4	at Atlanta Falcons	**W** 16–10	8–4	Atlanta–Fulton County Stadium	57,911	Recap
13	December 11	**Miami Dolphins**	**W** 14–10	9–4	Schaefer Stadium	61,064	Recap
14	December 18	at **Baltimore Colts**	**L** 24–30	9–5	Memorial Stadium	42,250	Recap
Note: Intra-division opponents are in **bold** text.

=== Game summaries ===
==== Week 1: vs Kansas City Chiefs ====
Week 1: Kansas City Chiefs at New England Patriots – Game summary

Quarter	1	2	3	4	Total
Chiefs	14	0	0	3	**17**
**Patriots**	7	7	7	0	**21**

at Schaefer Stadium, Foxborough, Massachusetts

- Date: September 18
- Game time: 1:00 p.m. EDT
- Game weather: Hazy, warm, 76 °F (24 °C)
- Game attendance: 58,185
- Referee: Fred Silva
- TV announcers (NBC): Charlie Jones and Len Dawson
- Box score

Game information

**First quarter**

- KC – MacArthur Lane 1-yard run (Jan Stenerud kick), 7:54. Chiefs 7–0. **Drive: 7 plays, 19 yards, 3:34.**
- KC – Tony Reed 10-yard run (Jan Stenerud kick), 4:15. Chiefs 14–0. **Drive: 3 plays, 65 yards, 1:28.**
- NE – Darryl Stingley 34-yard run (John Smith kick), 0:52. Chiefs 14–7. **Drive: 8 plays, 80 yards, 3:23.**

**Second quarter**

- NE – Darryl Stingley 21-yard pass from Steve Grogan (John Smith kick), 1:08. Tied 14–14. **Drive: 4 plays, 42 yards, 0:38.**

**Third quarter**

- NE – Jess Phillips 11-yard run (John Smith kick), 2:02. Patriots 21–14. **Drive: 7 plays, 59 yards, 3:38.**

**Fourth quarter**

- KC – Jan Stenerud 22-yard field goal, 10:23. Patriots 21–17. **Drive: 13 plays, 76 yards, 6:39.**

Top passers

- KC – Mike Livingston – 13/26, 219 yards
- NE – Steve Grogan – 10/16, 155 yards, TD, 2 INT

Top rushers

- KC – Tony Reed – 19 rushes, 88 yards, TD
- NE – Sam Cunningham – 23 rushes, 105 yards

Top receivers

- KC – Henry Marshall – 3 receptions, 76 yards
- NE – Sam Cunningham – 3 receptions, 48 yards

- Week 11
- Television: CBS
- Announcers: Don Criqui, Nick Buoniconti

Steve Grogan passed for two touchdowns in the first half, and the New England defense sacked Philadelphia Eagles quarterback Ron Jaworski eight times as the Patriots keep their faint playoff hopes alive with their win in front of a regional TV audience. Grogan hit Stanley Morgan on a scoring shot 64 yards in the first period, and then drilled a 16-yard pass to Darryl Stingley for another touchdown in the first half. The Eagles averted a shutout as Jaworski broke out of trouble and passed 12 yards to Charles Smith for a touchdown with just 52 seconds left to play.

=== Standings ===
AFC East
	W	L	T	PCT	DIV	CONF	PF	PA	STK
Baltimore Colts^{(2)}	10	4	0	.714	6–2	9–3	295	221	W1
Miami Dolphins	10	4	0	.714	6–2	8–4	313	197	W1
New England Patriots	9	5	0	.643	4–4	7–5	278	217	L1
New York Jets	3	11	0	.214	2–6	2–10	191	300	L2
Buffalo Bills	3	11	0	.214	2–6	2–10	160	313	L1

== See also ==
- New England Patriots seasons
