= Chuck Fairbanks =

American football player and coach (1933–2013)

Biographical details
- Born: June 10, 1933; Detroit, Michigan, U.S.
- Died: April 2, 2013 (aged 79); Scottsdale, Arizona, U.S.

Playing career
- 1952–1954: Michigan State

Coaching career (HC unless noted)
- 1955–1957: Ishpeming HS (MI)
- 1958–1961: Arizona State (assistant)
- 1962–1965: Houston (assistant)
- 1966: Oklahoma (DB)
- 1967–1972: Oklahoma
- 1973–1978: New England Patriots
- 1979–1981: Colorado
- 1983: New Jersey Generals

Head coaching record
- Overall: 59–41–1 (college); 46–40 (NFL); 6–12 (USFL)
- Bowls: 3–1–1

Accomplishments and honors

Championships
- As coach: 3 Big 8 (1967–1968, 1972); As player: National champion (1952)

Awards
- Sporting News College Football COY (1971); New England Patriots All-1970s Team; Big Eight Coach of the Year (1967)

Charles Leo Fairbanks (June 10, 1933 – April 2, 2013) was an American football coach who was a head coach at the high school, college and professional levels. He served as the head coach at the University of Oklahoma from 1967 to 1972 and at the University of Colorado from 1979 to 1981, compiling a career college record of 59–41–1 (.589). Fairbanks was also the head coach for the New England Patriots of the National Football League (NFL) from 1973 to 1978, amassing a record of 46–41 (.529), and for the New Jersey Generals of the United States Football League (USFL) in 1983, tallying a mark of 6–12.

== Early life ==
Born in Detroit, Fairbanks graduated from Charlevoix High School in 1951 and Michigan State University in 1955, following three years of varsity football with the Spartans under head coaches Biggie Munn and Duffy Daugherty. That fall, he began the first of three years as head coach of Ishpeming High School in Michigan's Upper Peninsula.

== College assistant ==
In 1958, he accepted an assistant coaching position at Arizona State University in Tempe, spending four years there under former Spartan teammate Frank Kush before moving on for another four-year stint at the University of Houston under Bill Yeoman from 1962 to 1965. In 1966, he accepted an assistant coaching position at the University of Oklahoma in Norman.

== Head coach ==
Following the unexpected death of 37-year-old Sooner head coach Jim Mackenzie in April 1967, Fairbanks was promoted to head coach four days later at age 33. He had nearly left for another assistant position at Missouri under Dan Devine, but decided to stay in Norman when Mackenzie moved him to offensive coordinator after the 1966 season.

Over the next six years, Fairbanks led Oklahoma to three Big Eight Conference titles, with 11–1 records in each of his final two seasons. Three months after his mid-contract departure to the New England Patriots of the NFL, Oklahoma was forced to forfeit nine games from the 1972 season after evidence of recruiting violations involving altered transcripts of student-athletes surfaced. Fairbanks denied any knowledge of this. The scandal under his watch made Sooners ineligible for bowl games or the UPI national championship for two years after he left.

After Fairbanks' departure from Oklahoma, his successor, Barry Switzer (coincidentally, Switzer interviewed for the vacant Michigan State head coaching position before Fairbanks departed Norman), won national titles in 1974 and 1975 with teams that were still on NCAA probation. Oklahoma claimed the national title in 1974 despite not being allowed to participate in a bowl game, and repeated in 1975 without a television appearance.

== NFL ==
On January 26, 1973, Fairbanks was named head coach of the New England Patriots of the National Football League (NFL). His first NFL draft that year included John Hannah, Sam Cunningham, Ray Hamilton, and Darryl Stingley, the first of a solid run of drafts through Fairbanks' tenure with the team. After the Patriots went 5–9 in his first year, the 1974 season was marred by a league-wide players' strike during training camp and preseason, which actually helped the Patriots as Fairbanks and defensive coordinator Hank Bullough were installing a new system (today known as the Fairbanks-Bullough 3–4, or the 3–4 two-gap system). They got a lot done because so many players who were not part of the NFL Players' Association, and eighteen first-year players made the roster. The Patriots stormed to a 6–1 start before other teams caught up with them and they finished 7–7.

Fairbanks then had a falling-out with quarterback Jim Plunkett, who was traded (in April 1976) for important draft picks to San Francisco, and suffered when hardball negotiating tactics by Patriot ownership led to a team-wide player strike that cancelled a preseason game with the New York Jets. The team never recovered and fell to 3–11 in 1975, but Fairbanks planted an important seed for the future by drafting quarterback Steve Grogan, who saw his first serious game action later that year.

With Grogan at quarterback, Fairbanks' Patriots erupted to 11–3 in 1976, a reversal of the 3–11 mark from the year before, and traveled to meet the 13–1 Oakland Raiders in the first round of the NFL playoffs. It was the franchise's second postseason berth and their first since the AFL-NFL merger; the other was thirteen years earlier in 1963. The game was a rematch of the Raiders' only loss in 1976, a 48–17 blowout win for the Patriots in Foxboro on October 3. New England entered the fourth quarter with a 21–10 lead, but a controversial roughing-the-passer call on defensive end Ray Hamilton by referee Ben Dreith wiped out a late incompletion by the Raiders, and quarterback Ken Stabler's dive into the endzone with eight seconds left gave Oakland a 24–21 comeback victory. Although Dreith insisted after the game that he had to call the penalty because he saw Hamilton hit Stabler on the head, replays showed that "Sugar Bear" had made no illegal contact. The call was condemned for years thereafter, and remained a bitter memory for the Patriots as the Raiders went on to win Super Bowl XI over the Minnesota Vikings. After the season, offensive line coach Red Miller became the head coach of the Denver Broncos.

In 1977, contract squabbles between the Sullivan family and offensive linemen John Hannah and Leon Gray led to discord within the team. The incident soured Fairbanks on Chuck Sullivan, who as the eldest son of team owner Billy Sullivan controlled the team's finances and had forced Fairbanks to renege on his proposed contracts with Hannah and Gray. Denied Fairbanks' promised contract by the ownership team, Hannah later contended that the Sullivans "took Chuck's authority away and turned him into a liar." The Patriots narrowly missed making the playoffs on the last weekend of the regular season, while Miller's Broncos advanced to Super Bowl XII.

The following year in 1978, tragedy struck during the preseason as Stingley suffered paralysis following a violent hit by Raiders' safety Jack Tatum at Oakland on August 12. Fairbanks had worked out a contract extension with Stingley before the game, but the following Monday Chuck Sullivan reneged on the deal. Fairbanks was livid and resolved to leave the team after the season.

The Patriots raced to an 11–4 record and won the AFC East title, and seemed poised to challenge for a Super Bowl berth. Hours prior to the final regular season game (on Monday night), Sullivan suspended Fairbanks for breaking his contract by agreeing to become head coach for the University of Colorado. Fairbanks was reinstated a few days later, well ahead of their divisional round playoff game (and the franchise's first home playoff game), but the second-seeded Patriots were upset 31–14 by superstar running back Earl Campbell and the fifth-seed Houston Oilers.

New England sued Fairbanks for breach of contract. During discovery for the suit, he admitted recruiting for Colorado while still working for the Patriots, who won an injunction preventing him from leaving. But on April 2, 1979, a group of CU boosters (Flatirons Club) bought out his contract, making it possible for him to leave the Patriots. Paul Zimmerman, Sports Illustrated's dean of professional football writers, speculated that the animus surrounding Fairbanks' departure from New England stemmed from the fact that, unlike the late-season departure of New York Jets coach Lou Holtz for Arkansas in 1976, "no one" felt Fairbanks "was a really nice guy."

== Return to collegiate ranks ==
The legal battle to make Fairbanks the Buffaloes' head coach proved not be worth the effort when he compiled a dismal 7–26 record (.212) in three seasons for Colorado (3–8, 1–10, 3–8). His second game with the Buffaloes, a 44–0 loss at home to LSU, was a portent of things to come. By contrast, his predecessor's worst record was 5–6 in his first season. His time at CU was a tumultuous period for the football and athletic program, headed by former head coach Eddie Crowder.

Fairbanks has been routinely and incorrectly credited for the unpopular color switch from black to sky blue jerseys in 1981, his final season in Boulder. The color change was mandated by CU's board of regents to reflect "the Colorado sky at nine thousand feet (2,700 m)," but did not win fan support. (The school's official colors are silver and gold, and the CU teams traditionally wore black and gold since 1959.) A darker shade of blue was introduced in 1984, but black jerseys were restored for the Oklahoma and Nebraska games in Boulder, and for all home games starting in 1985.

The Buffalo program sank so low under Fairbanks that his successor, Bill McCartney, posted records of 2–8–1, 4–7 and 1–10 in his first three seasons before finally getting Colorado back on track. McCartney's tenure crested with an 11–0 regular season in 1989 and the Associated Press national championship the next season, burying Fairbanks' disastrous tenure once and for all.

== USFL ==
Fairbanks resigned from CU on June 1, 1982, to become president and head coach of the New Jersey Generals of the fledgling United States Football League (USFL). Majority owner J. Walter Duncan also sold Fairbanks a 10 percent stake in the team.

Even before coaching his first game in the new league, Fairbanks once again found himself immersed in controversy. Georgia junior Herschel Walker, the reigning Heisman Trophy winner, signed with the Generals on February 23, 1983.

His time in New Jersey, like his tenure at Colorado, was met with little success on the field as the Generals finished the 1983 season at 6–12. His departure from the Generals was a result of Donald Trump's purchase of complete control of the franchise from Fairbanks and majority owner J. Walter Duncan on September 22, 1983, and was succeeded at head coach by Walt Michaels. The innovative but scandal-marred Fairbanks never coached again, either collegiately or professionally; he moved on to real estate and golf course development, creating PGA West and launching many other successful California and Arizona ventures.

== Legacy ==
Fairbanks' schemes have influenced the New England Patriots (under head coach Bill Belichick).

In a 2007 press conference, Belichick said the following of Fairbanks: "I think Chuck has had a tremendous influence on the league as well as this organization in terms of nomenclature and terminology and those kinds of things. I'm sure Chuck could walk in and look at our playbook and probably 80 percent of the plays are the same terminology that he used – whether it be formations or coverages or pass protections. We were sitting there talking yesterday and he was saying, 'How much 60 protection are you guys using? How much 80 are you using?' All of the stuff that was really the fundamentals of his system are still in place here even, again, to the way we call formations and plays and coverages and some of our individual calls within a call, a certain adjustment or things that Red (Miller) and Hank (Bullough) and Ron (Erhardt) and those guys used when they were here."

== Death ==
Fairbanks died at age 79 from brain cancer on April 2, 2013.

== Head coaching record ==
=== College ===
Year	Team	Overall	Conference	Standing	Bowl/playoffs	Coaches^{#}	AP^{°}
Oklahoma Sooners (Big Eight Conference) (1967–1972)
1967	Oklahoma	10–1	7–0	1st	W Orange	3	3
1968	Oklahoma	7–4	6–1	1st	L Astro-Bluebonnet	10	11
1969	Oklahoma	6–4	4–3	4th			
1970	Oklahoma	7–4–1	5–2	T–2nd	T Astro-Bluebonnet	15	20
1971	Oklahoma	11–1	6–1	2nd	W Sugar	3	2
1972	Oklahoma	11–1	6–1	1st	W Sugar	2	2
Oklahoma:		52–15–1	34–8				
Colorado Buffaloes (Big Eight Conference) (1979–1981)
1979	Colorado	3–8	2–5	T–5th			
1980	Colorado	1–10	1–6	T–7th			
1981	Colorado	3–8	2–5	7th			
Colorado:		7–26	5–16				
Total:		59–41–1					
National championship Conference title Conference division title or championship game berth
^{#}Rankings from final Coaches Poll.; ^{°}Rankings from final AP Poll.

=== NFL ===
Team	Year	Regular season					Postseason			
Team	Year	Won	Lost	Ties	Win %	Finish	Won	Lost	Win %	Result
NE	1973	5	9	0	.357	3rd in AFC East	–	–	–	–
NE	1974	7	7	0	.500	3rd in AFC East	–	–	–	–
NE	1975	3	11	0	.214	5th in AFC East	–	–	–	–
NE	1976	11	3	0	.786	2nd in AFC East	0	1	.000	Lost to Oakland Raiders in AFC Divisional Game
NE	1977	9	5	0	.643	3rd in AFC East	–	–	–	–
NE	1978	11	4	0	.733	1st in AFC East	0	1	.000	Lost to Houston Oilers in AFC Divisional Game
Total		46	39	0	.541		0	2	.000	

=== USFL ===
Team	Year	Regular season					Postseason			
Team	Year	Won	Lost	Ties	Win %	Finish	Won	Lost	Win %	Result
NJG	1983	6	12	0	.333	3rd in Atlantic	–	–	–	–
Total		6	12	0	.333					
