= Steve Grogan =

American football player (born 1953)

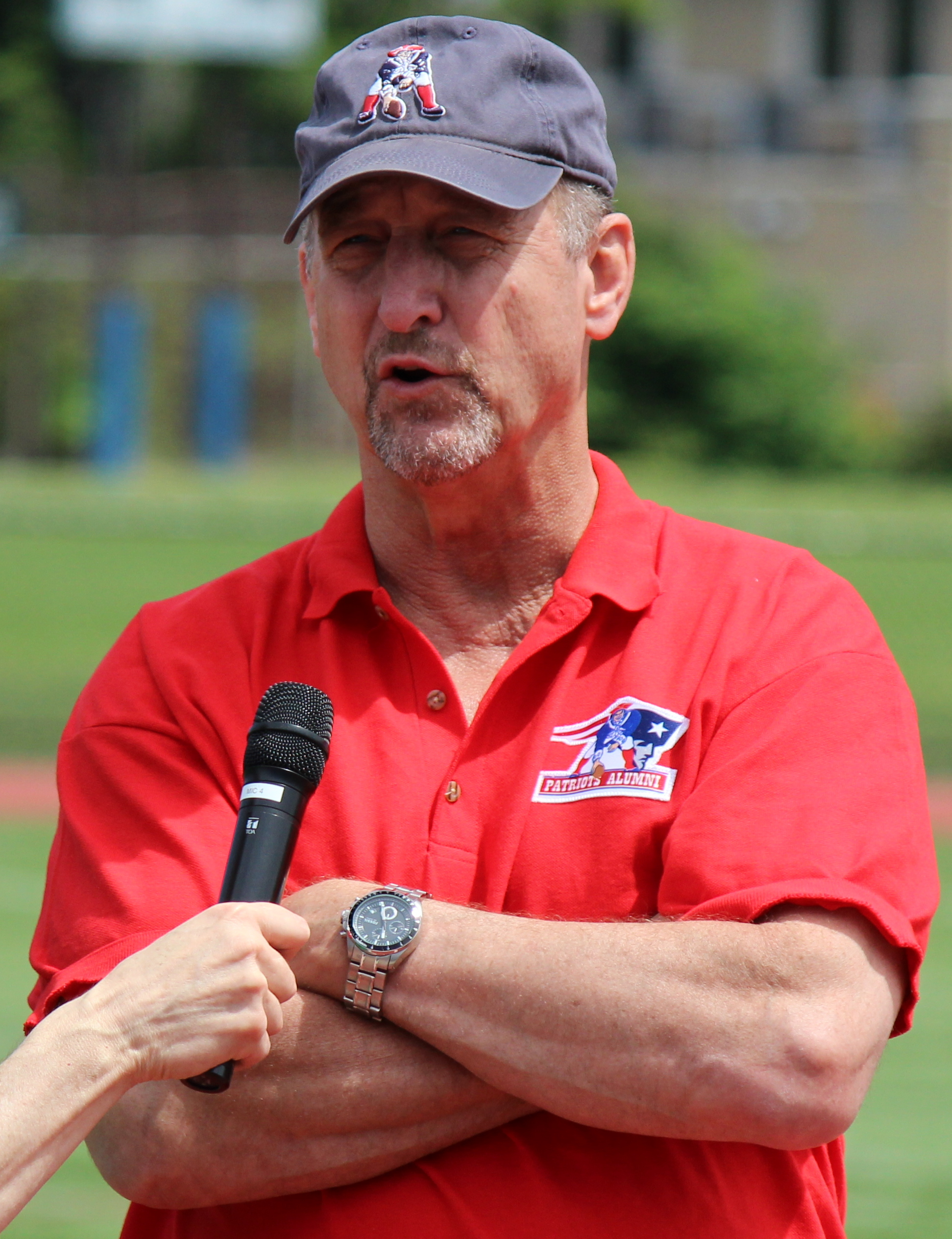
- Grogan in 2015

No. 14
- Position: Quarterback

Personal information
- Born: July 24, 1953 (age 73); San Antonio, Texas, U.S.
- Listed height: 6 ft 4 in (1.93 m)
- Listed weight: 210 lb (95 kg)

Career information
- High school: Ottawa (Ottawa, Kansas)
- College: Kansas State (1972–1974)
- NFL draft: 1975: 5th round, 116th overall pick

Career history
- New England Patriots (1975–1990)

Awards and highlights
- NFL passing touchdowns leader (1979); New England Patriots All-1970s Team; New England Patriots All-1980s Team; New England Patriots 35th Anniversary Team; New England Patriots Hall of Fame; Kansas State Wildcats No. 11 retired; Kansas State Wildcats Hall of Fame; Kansas State Football Ring of Honor; Kansas Sports Hall of Fame

Career NFL statistics
- Passing attempts: 3,593
- Passing completions: 1,879
- Completion percentage: 52.3%
- TD–INT: 182–208
- Passing yards: 26,886
- Passer rating: 69.6
- Rushing yards: 2,176
- Rushing touchdowns: 35
- Stats at Pro Football Reference

Steven James Grogan (born July 24, 1953) is an American former professional football quarterback who played in the National Football League (NFL) for 16 seasons with the New England Patriots. He played college football for the Kansas State Wildcats and was selected by the Patriots in the fifth round of the 1975 NFL draft.

Grogan led the NFL in both passing and quarterback rushing statistics several times in his career, and ran for a quarterback-record 12 touchdowns in 1976, a record that stood for 35 seasons. Grogan ran for over 500 yards in 1978 and led the team to 3,156 rushing yards, an NFL record that was eclipsed only by the 2019 Baltimore Ravens. He had his statistically best year in 1979, before being hobbled by injuries for much of the 1980s. He only had one season during the rest of his career, 1983, when he started more than half of his team's games, and spent the majority of the rest of his career splitting starting time with a number of other quarterbacks. He played in Super Bowl XX, coming off the bench to throw a pass for the only touchdown the Patriots scored on the day. When he retired in 1990, he held many of the team's passing and longevity records. He was inducted into the New England Patriots Hall of Fame in 1995.

== Early life and college ==
Grogan grew up in Ottawa Kansas, a few blocks away from Ottawa University. Both of his parents were alumni and took Grogan to many sporting events there when he was younger. At Ottawa High School, Grogan led his team to state titles in track in 1970, basketball in 1971, and a 3A state runner-up finish in football in 1970. He was named the team MVP six different times and won the Inspiration & Leadership Award in 1975. He was also a member of National Honor Society and was named Mr. O.H.S.

Grogan spent his collegiate career at Kansas State University, where he started as a quarterback for his junior and senior years. He threw for 2,214 yards, completing 166 of 371 pass attempts, with 12 TDs and 26 interceptions. He ran for 585 yards and six touchdowns on 339 attempts, punted 7 times for 279 yards (a 39.9-yard average), and as a senior caught one touchdown pass of 22 yards. Against Memphis in 1973, he had a 100-yard rushing game. He was named academic "All Big 8" twice and was honorable mention All-American.

== Professional career ==
=== 1975–1979: initial successes ===
Grogan was selected in the fifth round (116th overall) in the 1975 NFL draft by the New England Patriots. Although he would start every game for four consecutive seasons early in his career, Grogan also competed with other quarterbacks for the starting job. His second through his fifth season were the only times he would start every game in a season. In addition to taking the starting job from former Heisman Trophy winner Jim Plunkett as a rookie, Grogan would later face competition from Matt Cavanaugh, Tony Eason, Heisman Trophy winner Doug Flutie, and Marc Wilson.

In his first season, Grogan played in 13 games out of the then-14 game regular season, starting 7 of the last 8. Grogan threw for 1,976 yards, 11 touchdowns and 18 interceptions. The Patriots finished with a 3–11 record, and traded Plunkett, their starter for the previous four years, in the off-season. Grogan's first career victory came against the Dan Fouts and the San Diego Chargers in week 8 of the 1975 season. He threw for 285 yards and 1 touchdown in a 33–19 win.

For the Patriots 1976 season, Grogan scored 30 combined touchdowns through the air and the ground, leading the Patriots to an 11–3 record the franchise's first playoff berth since 1963. The eleven wins were the most Patriots wins in a season since the club's inception. Along the way the Patriots defeated the defending Super Bowl champion, Pittsburgh Steelers (30–27). They also handed the Oakland Raiders their only regular season loss that year by defeating them 48–17. They lost the divisional playoffs (24–21), however, to the Raiders. Grogan scored 12 rushing touchdowns in 1976, breaking a quarterback record of 11 previously held by Tobin Rote and Johnny Lujack. His record would stand for 35 years until broken by Carolina Panthers quarterback Cam Newton's 14 in 2011. Grogan would lead the league in quarterback rushing yards with 397. On October 10, 1976, in a game vs the Jets, Grogan became the first quarterback in Patriots history to rush for 100+ yards in a game, in a 41–7 victory.

During the 1977 season, Grogan advanced the ball with his legs, amassing another 300+ yard rushing season, although he would only find the end zone once on a running play, as running backs Horace Ivory, Sam "Bam" Cunningham, and Andy Johnson did most of the scoring on the ground. Rookie Stanley Morgan was selected in the first round of that year's draft and the two became the most successful tandem in Patriots history by the time of their retirements. The team fell to 9–5, however, and missed the playoffs. At the end of the season Grogan led the league in rushing yards among all other quarterbacks for a second straight season.

In the Patriots 1978 season, Grogan scored 20 combined touchdowns and threw just shy of 3000 yards. He led the Patriots to an 11–5 record, a division title and the organization's first ever home playoff game, a 31–14 loss to the Houston Oilers. The Patriots set the all-time single season team rushing record with 3,156 yards (Grogan rushing for 539 yards and 5 touchdowns himself), a record that stood until broken by the 2019 Baltimore Ravens. Grogan led all quarterbacks in rushing at the end of the year. This is also the only season an NFL team has had 4 players rush for over 500 yards apiece.

Statistically, Grogan's best season was the Patriots 1979 season, when he completed 206 of 423 passes for 3,286 yards and 28 touchdowns, rushing for 368 yards and 2 touchdowns. His 28 touchdown passes led the league, tied with Brian Sipe of Cleveland, and his rushing yards led the league for quarterbacks for a fourth consecutive year. Grogan would also have his best statistical game of his career that season vs the Jets when he went 13–18 on passes for 315 yards, five touchdowns and no interceptions, and rushed for 45 yards in a 56–3 win over the jets. The Patriots finished with a 9–7 record, however, missing the playoffs.

=== 1980–1985: injuries and recovery ===
In the early 1980s, Grogan suffered several injuries, and split starting duties on-and-off with Matt Cavanaugh. During the early 1980s, the Patriots failed to make the playoffs in 1980 and 1981 (when they had a 2–14 record), making the tournament only during the strike-shortened 1982 season. The Patriots drafted quarterback Tony Eason in the first round of the 1983 NFL draft. As Eason put the pressure on Grogan to perform, he returned to form during the 1983 season throwing 15 touchdowns and rushing for 2, but was then replaced by Eason as the primary starter in 1984 after a 1–2 start. Due to a neck injury he suffered Grogan would start to wear his signature neck roll that would become synonymous with him for the rest of his career and beyond retirement.

By the Patriots 1985 season, Eason had taken the starting quarterback position and led the Patriots to a 2–3 record initially. Coach Raymond Berry benched Eason for Grogan. The Patriots won 6 straight games behind their old quarterback, only to lose Grogan when he suffered a broken leg in Week 12 against the New York Jets. Filling in again at QB, Eason and the Patriots lost that Jets game 16–13 in overtime, and relinquished first place in the AFC East Division. With Eason's return, the Patriots went 3–2 in their remaining five games. Finishing the season with an 11–5 record, the Patriots earned a wild card berth into the playoffs and eventually reached Super Bowl XX, where they faced the Chicago Bears, who, with their defensive coach Buddy Ryan's "46" defense, had gone 15–1 during the regular season. Eason, who had led the Patriots to victory in the wild card, divisional, and conference playoff games, started the game, but the Patriots could do little against the Bears' defense and Eason went 0–6 in passing attempts; Berry replaced him with Grogan. Grogan went on to connect on 17 of 30 passes for 177 yards, a touchdown, but also two interceptions, in the 46–10 loss. The Patriots were the only team to score against the Bears in the playoffs that season.

=== 1986–1990: the end of his career ===
Eason returned to the full-time starter position for the 1986 season, while Grogan appeared in only four games (two as a starter) when Eason was injured. For the rest of the 1980s, Grogan battled for playing time not only with Eason, but also with backup Tom Ramsey, Doug Flutie, and Marc Wilson. The Patriots struggled to remain above .500 for the final four years of his career, culminating in the 1–15 campaign of 1990, after which Grogan retired.

=== Retirement and legacy ===
At the time of his retirement, Grogan led the franchise as the all-time leader in passing yards (26,886) and passing touchdowns (182). As of 2019, he is ranked third in passing yards behind Tom Brady and Drew Bledsoe, and second in passing touchdowns behind Brady. His 16 seasons are the second most ever for a Patriots player, behind Tom Brady. He also held the Patriots previous single-game record with a 153.9 quarterback rating, achieved by completing 13-of-18 passes for 315 yards with five touchdowns and no interceptions against the New York Jets on September 9, 1979, before Drew Bledsoe posted a perfect 158.3 rating against the Indianapolis Colts on December 26, 1993. Grogan rushed for 2,176 yards (4.9 per carry) and 35 touchdowns during his career, a mark which places him as the Patriots' fourth overall in rushing touchdowns. With Grogan, the Patriots made the playoffs five times (1976, 1978, 1982, 1985, and 1986 as a backup). Before Grogan was drafted, the Patriots made the playoffs just once from 1960 to 1974.

Hall of Fame guard John Hannah once referred to Grogan as “the toughest player he ever played with in his career.” He continues to be a beloved figure among Patriots fans to this day. One sports writer for the Boston Globe, wrote of the "Grogan Toughness Meter" in 2003. The writer, Nick Cafardo, gave a partial listing of Grogan's injuries over his 16-year career: "Five knee surgeries; screws in his leg after the tip of his fibula snapped; a cracked fibula that snapped when he tried to practice; two ruptured disks in his neck, which he played with for 1 1/2 seasons; a broken left hand (he simply handed off with his right hand); two separated shoulders on each side; the reattachment of a tendon to his throwing elbow; and three concussions." During an interview with Fox Sports in 2016 Grogan talked about the injuries stating "It takes a toll, but I loved to play the game, and if I could get out there without hurting my team by playing through aches or pains, I was going to be out there to play."

== After football ==
After retiring from the Patriots, Grogan attempted to get a coaching job, but found that no one above the high school level would hire him (except for the New England Blitz of the Professional Spring Football League, which announced Grogan as their head coach in 1992, but folded before playing a game). He was approached by the then-owner of Marciano Sporting Goods in Mansfield, Massachusetts (a business originally started by Rocky Marciano's brother Peter) to purchase the struggling business from him. Living only five miles from the store, and seeing it as a good investment, Grogan agreed to purchase the store, renamed it Grogan Marciano Sporting Goods, and continues to run the business as of 2013. In addition to running the sporting goods shop, he also makes appearances at other local businesses and civic organizations.

Grogan and his wife have also dedicated time to charitable events in the Massachusetts area. Grogan has been part of numerous charity events to help people with mental disabilities and taken part in charity golf events. Grogan is married and has three children. His oldest son Tyler also played football in college and had a career in the CIFL. He started out as a quarterback like his father but eventually converted to wide receiver.

== NFL career statistics ==
Legend
	Led the league
**Bold**	Career high

=== Regular season ===
Year	Team	Games			Passing								Rushing				Sacked		Fumbles	
Year	Team	GP	GS	Record	Cmp	Att	Pct	Yds	Avg	TD	Int	Rtg	Att	Yds	Avg	TD	Sck	SckY	Fum	Lost
1975	NE	13	7	1–6	139	274	50.7	1,976	7.2	11	18	60.4	30	110	3.7	3	22	207	6	2
1976	NE	14	14	**11–3**	145	302	48.0	1,903	6.3	18	20	60.6	60	397	6.6	**12**	18	155	6	2
1977	NE	14	14	9–5	160	305	52.5	2,162	7.1	17	21	65.2	61	324	5.3	1	14	155	7	5
1978	NE	16	16	11–5	182	362	50.0	2,824	7.8	15	**23**	63.6	**81**	**539**	**6.7**	5	21	184	9	7
1979	NE	16	16	9–7	**206**	**423**	48.7	**3,286**	7.8	**28**	20	77.4	64	368	5.8	2	**45**	**341**	**12**	**8**
1980	NE	12	12	7–5	175	306	57.2	2,475	8.1	18	22	73.1	30	112	3.7	1	17	138	4	3
1981	NE	8	7	1–6	117	216	54.2	1,859	8.6	7	16	63.0	12	49	4.1	2	19	137	5	3
1982	NE	6	6	4–2	66	122	54.1	930	7.6	7	4	84.4	9	42	4.7	1	8	48	2	1
1983	NE	12	12	6–6	168	303	55.4	2,411	8.0	15	12	81.4	23	108	4.7	2	29	195	4	3
1984	NE	3	3	2–1	32	68	47.1	444	6.5	3	6	46.4	7	12	1.7	0	7	45	4	2
1985	NE	7	6	5–1	85	156	54.5	1,311	8.4	7	5	84.1	20	29	1.5	2	11	86	6	5
1986	NE	4	2	1–1	62	102	**60.8**	976	**9.6**	9	2	**113.8**	9	23	2.6	1	4	34	2	1
1987	NE	7	6	4–2	93	161	57.8	1,183	7.4	10	9	78.2	20	37	1.9	2	7	55	8	2
1988	NE	6	4	1–3	67	140	47.9	834	6.0	4	13	37.6	6	12	2.0	1	8	77	2	1
1989	NE	7	6	2–4	133	261	51.0	1,697	6.5	9	14	60.8	9	19	2.1	0	8	64	3	1
1990	NE	4	4	1–3	50	92	54.3	615	6.7	4	3	76.1	4	−5	−1.3	0	9	68	1	0
Total		149	135	75–60	1,897	3,593	52.3	26,886	7.5	182	208	69.6	445	2,176	4.9	35	247	1,986	81	47

=== Postseason ===
Year	Team	Games			Passing								Rushing				Sacked		Fumbles	
Year	Team	GP	GS	Record	Cmp	Att	Pct	Yds	Avg	TD	Int	Rtg	Att	Yds	Avg	TD	Sck	SckY	Fum	Lost
1976	NE	1	1	0–1	12	23	52.2	167	**7.3**	**1**	1	**72.2**	**7**	**35**	5.0	0	0	0	0	0
1978	NE	1	1	0–1	3	12	25.0	38	3.2	0	**2**	0.7	1	16	**16.0**	0	1	3	0	0
1982	NE	1	1	0–1	16	**30**	53.3	**189**	6.3	**1**	**2**	56.1	0	0	0.0	0	**4**	29	0	0
1985	NE	1	0	–	**17**	**30**	**56.7**	177	5.9	**1**	**2**	57.2	1	3	3.0	0	**4**	**33**	0	0
1986	NE	0	0	–	DNP															
Total		4	3	0–3	48	95	50.5	571	6.0	3	7	49.1	9	54	6.0	0	9	65	0	0

== Honors ==
Grogan's high school, Ottawa High School in Ottawa, Kansas has named its football stadium after him, he was inducted into the KSHSAA Hall of Fame in 1976 and he was also inducted into the State of Kansas Sports Hall of Fame in 1999. In 1984 Grogan was voted the Patriots Ed Block Courage Award winner. Kansas State has retired the number Grogan wore for the Wildcats, #11, to jointly honor him and Lynn Dickey, who also wore #11. It is the only number retired by Kansas State. (Grogan wore #14 with the Patriots.) Grogan was inducted into the Kansas State athletics hall of fame in 1995. In 2002 he was a part of the inaugural class of players to have their name enshrined on the Kansas State football ring of honor.

In 2003 Grogan received the Football Legacy Award from The Sports Museum at TD Garden. Grogan received the Kansas State Alumni Medallion in 1995. The award is the most prestigious of all the organizations achievements, it was given to Grogan for his charitable efforts.

Grogan was named to the Patriots 35th Anniversary Team in 1994, and was elected into the Patriots Hall of Fame in 1995. He was also elected to the Patriot's All-Decade teams of the 1970s and the 1980s. In 2009 Grogan was a given a special award for his achievements both on and off the field at the Hockomock Area YMCA's fourth annual Legends Ball. In 2018, Bleacher Report named Grogan number 48 on their list of Bostons 50 greatest athlete of all time.
