= Eddie Hare =

American football player (born 1957)

No. 8
- Position: Punter

Personal information
- Born: May 30, 1957 (age 69); Ulysses, Kansas, U.S.
- Listed height: 6 ft 4 in (1.93 m)
- Listed weight: 209 lb (95 kg)

Career information
- High school: Kilgore (TX)
- College: Tulsa
- NFL draft: 1979: 4th round, 106th overall pick

Career history
- New England Patriots (1979)

Career NFL statistics
- Punts: 83
- Punt yards: 3,038
- Longest punt: 58
- Stats at Pro Football Reference

Edward Everett Hare (born May 30, 1957) is an American former professional football player who was a punter for the New England Patriots of the National Football League (NFL) in 1979. He played college football for the Tulsa Golden Hurricane.
