= Russ Francis =

American football player (1953–2023)

No. 81, 49
- Position: Tight end

Personal information
- Born: April 3, 1953; Seattle, Washington, U.S.
- Died: October 1, 2023 (aged 70); Lake Placid, New York, U.S.
- Listed height: 6 ft 6 in (1.98 m)
- Listed weight: 240 lb (109 kg)

Career information
- High school: Kailua (HI); Pleasant Hill (OR)
- College: Oregon
- NFL draft: 1975: 1st round, 16th overall pick

Career history
- New England Patriots (1975–1980); San Francisco 49ers (1982–1987); New England Patriots (1987–1989)

Awards and highlights
- Super Bowl champion (XIX); 2× Second-team All-Pro (1976, 1978); 3× Pro Bowl (1977–1979); PFWA All-Rookie Team (1975); New England Patriots All-1970s Team; New England Patriots 35th Anniversary Team; First-team All-Pac-8 (1973)

Career NFL statistics
- Receptions: 393
- Receiving yards: 5,262
- Receiving touchdowns: 40
- Stats at Pro Football Reference

Russell Ross Francis (April 3, 1953 – October 1, 2023) was an American professional football player who was a tight end for 13 seasons in the National Football League (NFL). He played for the New England Patriots and San Francisco 49ers. He was also a professional wrestler. Francis finished his NFL career with 393 receptions for 5,262 yards and 40 touchdowns. He was inducted into the Oregon Sports Hall of Fame in 1993.

In 2021, the Professional Football Researchers Association named Francis to the PFRA Hall of Very Good Class of 2021.

== Early life and career ==
Francis began high school at Kailua High School on Oahu, Hawaii, and finished at Pleasant Hill High School in Oregon, southeast of Eugene. He set the national high school record for the javelin as a senior in 1971 at 259 ft 9 in (79.17 m); the record stood until 1988. Francis was also a decathlete for Pleasant Hill.

== College career ==
At the University of Oregon in Eugene, 6 ft 6 in (1.98 m) Francis threw the javelin and played only 14 games of varsity football for the Ducks. Injured after three games as a sophomore in 1972, he played in 1973, but sat out his senior season in 1974.

Francis enrolled at rival Oregon State University in order to expire his collegiate eligibility and be eligible for the 1975 NFL draft. Briefly a pro wrestler, he trained for the Superstars competition and was selected in the first round by the New England Patriots, the 16th overall pick and signed in May.

== Professional career ==
=== New England Patriots (1975–1980) ===
During the Patriots 30–27 win in 1976 over the two-time defending Super Bowl champion Pittsburgh Steelers on September 26, Francis caught a 38-yard touchdown pass from Steve Grogan on fourth and one. In that same game, Francis had a career-best 139 yards receiving. As a result, Howard Cosell proclaimed him as the "All-World Tight End".

In 1978, Francis had a career-longest 53-yard reception and 126 yards receiving in the Patriots 21–14 win over the Oakland Raiders at the Oakland Coliseum on September 24. That season, he led the Patriots in receptions with 39 catches for 543 yards.

Francis was a Pro Bowl selection for three consecutive seasons (1977–1979).

Following the 1980 season, Francis opted to retire from professional football after the Patriots refused to give him his promised bonus for making the Pro Bowl that he missed due to injury, and when the team tried to cancel Darryl Stingley's medical insurance after he was paralyzed by a Jack Tatum hit two years earlier. Francis, who was roommates with Stingley, said that it was tough to play after Stingley's injury.

=== San Francisco 49ers (1982–1987) ===
After sitting out the 1981 season, Francis came out of retirement and joined the 49ers for the 1982 season. In the 49ers' win over the Miami Dolphins in Super Bowl XIX, he had five receptions for 60 yards. In 1985, he had a career-high 44 receptions.

=== New England Patriots (1987–1988) ===
Francis was released by the 49ers in 1987 and rejoined the Patriots before the season's final game. He was on the roster in 1988 but after missing the 1989 season due to injury and then being released, he retired for the second time.

== NFL career statistics ==
Legend
	Won the Super Bowl
**Bold**	Career high

=== Regular season ===
Year	Team	Games		Receiving				
Year	Team	GP	GS	Rec	Yds	Avg	Lng	TD
1975	NE	14	11	35	636	**18.2**	48	4
1976	NE	13	12	26	367	14.1	48	3
1977	NE	10	10	16	229	14.3	31	4
1978	NE	15	15	39	543	13.9	**53**	4
1979	NE	12	12	39	557	14.3	44	5
1980	NE	15	15	41	**664**	16.2	39	**8**
1982	SF	9	4	23	278	12.1	26	2
1983	SF	16	16	33	357	10.8	25	4
1984	SF	10	8	23	285	12.4	32	2
1985	SF	16	16	**44**	478	10.9	25	3
1986	SF	16	14	41	505	12.3	52	1
1987	SF	8	7	22	202	9.2	19	0
1987	NE	1	0	0	0	0.0	0	0
1988	NE	12	8	11	161	14.6	51	0
Career		167	148	393	5,262	13.4	53	40

=== Postseason ===
Year	Team	Games		Receiving				
Year	Team	GP	GS	Rec	Yds	Avg	Lng	TD
1976	NE	1	1	4	96	**24.0**	**40**	**1**
1978	NE	1	1	**8**	101	12.6	24	**1**
1983	SF	2	2	**8**	**123**	15.4	27	0
1984	SF	3	3	**8**	89	11.1	19	**1**
1985	SF	1	1	4	39	9.8	20	0
1986	SF	1	1	3	26	8.7	20	0
Career		9	9	35	474	13.5	40	3

== Professional Wrestling career ==
He was the son of wrestling promoter Ed Francis and got into wrestling in 1974 in Vancouver. He briefly competed full-time in the American Wrestling Association (AWA) from 1976 to 1977. He also competed in the National Wrestling Alliance's NWA Hawaii from 1977 to 1978 where at one time he held the NWA Hawaii Tag Team Championship with his older brother, Billy Roy Francis. In 1978, he left wrestling and continued playing football.

Francis appeared in a 20-man battle royal at WrestleMania 2 along with other NFL stars. In 1987, he returned to AWA for a few matches and then retired.

== Outside football ==
Francis qualified for The Superstars final and the World Superstars in 1980 and 1981, finishing second in the 1980 final and third in the 1981 event. He won the football preliminary in 1981 and set a record of 23.91 seconds in the 50-yard (46 m) swimming event. That record stood until 1986, when it was broken by Greg Louganis.

After retiring, he hosted The Russ Francis Show from 9 am to noon on 107.7 WTPL "The Pulse", out of Concord, New Hampshire, and later he hosted Forever West Outdoors from 4 to 6 pm on 1400 AM KODI, out of Cody, Wyoming.

In 2015, he was inducted into the Polynesian Football Hall of Fame as a contributor. Francis was also the president of Lake Placid Airways, a scenic and charter-flight airline.

== Politics ==
In 2000, Francis challenged long-time Democratic incumbent Patsy Mink for Hawaii's 2nd congressional district.

Running as a Republican, Francis was defeated, winning 35.97% of the vote to Mink's 61.59%.

== Death ==
On October 1, 2023, Francis and AOPA Air Safety Institute vice president Richard McSpadden were both killed in a plane crash in Lake Placid, New York, after the 1976 Cessna 177RG flown by Francis out of Lake Placid Airport experienced power failure and attempted to return to the airport, but struck a berm on the runway and crashed into a ravine. Francis was 70 years old.

== See also ==
- List of gridiron football players who became professional wrestlers
