= Mike Hubach =

American football player (born 1958)

No. 6
- Position: Punter

Personal information
- Born: January 26, 1958 (age 68); Cleveland, Ohio, U.S.
- Listed height: 5 ft 10 in (1.78 m)
- Listed weight: 185 lb (84 kg)

Career information
- High school: West Tech (Cleveland)
- College: Kansas
- NFL draft: 1980: 11th round, 293rd overall pick

Career history
- New England Patriots (1980–1981)

Awards and highlights
- 2× First-team All-Big Eight (1978, 1979)

Career NFL statistics
- Punts: 82
- Punt yards: 3,118
- Longest punt: 69
- Stats at Pro Football Reference

Mike Hubach (born January 26, 1958) is an American former professional football player who was a punter for the New England Patriots of the National Football League (NFL) from 1980 to 1981. He played college football for the Kansas Jayhawks.
