= Doug McDougald =

American football player (born 1957)

No. 70
- Position: Defensive end

Personal information
- Born: February 6, 1957 (age 69); Fayetteville, North Carolina, U.S.
- Listed height: 6 ft 5 in (1.96 m)
- Listed weight: 271 lb (123 kg)

Career information
- High school: Seventy-First (Fayetteville)
- College: Virginia Tech
- NFL draft: 1980: 5th round, 124th overall pick

Career history
- New England Patriots (1980)

Career NFL statistics
- Sacks: 0.5
- Stats at Pro Football Reference

Douglas Elaine McDougald (born February 6, 1957) is an American former professional football player who was a defensive end for the New England Patriots of the National Football League (NFL). He played college football for the Virginia Tech Hokies.
