= Ron Erhardt =

American football player and coach, college athletics administrator

Biographical details
- Born: February 27, 1931; Mandan, North Dakota, U.S.
- Died: March 21, 2012 (aged 81); Boca Raton, Florida, U.S.
- Education: University of Jamestown

Coaching career (HC unless noted)
- 1956: Williston HS (ND) (assistant)
- 1957–1959: St. Mary's HS (ND)
- 1960–1962: Bishop Ryan HS (ND)
- 1963–1965: North Dakota State (assistant)
- 1966–1972: North Dakota State
- 1973–1976: New England Patriots (RB)
- 1977–1978: New England Patriots (OC)
- 1978: New England Patriots (interim co-HC)
- 1979–1981: New England Patriots
- 1982–1990: New York Giants (OC)
- 1991: New York Giants (assistant)
- 1992–1995: Pittsburgh Steelers (OC)
- 1996–1997: New York Jets (OC)
- 1997–1998: New York Jets (QB)

Administrative career (AD unless noted)
- 1968–1973: North Dakota State

Head coaching record
- Overall: 61–7–1 (college); 21–28 (NFL); 45–9–2 (high school)
- Bowls: 3–1

Accomplishments and honors

Championships
- 2 NCAA College Division (1968–1969); 6 NCC (1966–1970, 1972) As offensive coordinator: 2× Super Bowl champion (XXI, XXV); University of Jamestown Athletic Hall of Fame (1984)

Ronald Peter Erhardt (February 27, 1931 – March 21, 2012) was an American football coach at both the collegiate and professional levels. From 1979 to 1981 he served as head coach of the National Football League (NFL)'s New England Patriots.

== Early life ==
A native of Mandan, North Dakota, Erhardt played football and graduated from Jamestown College in 1953, then spent the next two years serving in the military. After leaving the service, he was hired in 1956 as an assistant coach at Williston High School in Williston, North Dakota. The following year, he began a six-year run as a head coach at two North Dakota Catholic high schools: from 1957 to 1959, his teams at St. Mary's (New England, ND) compiled a mark of 25–3–1, followed by another three-year run at Bishop Ryan High School in Minot, where he was 20–6–1 from 1960 to 1962.

== Early career ==
Erhardt's successes elevated him to the collegiate level, where he served as an assistant at North Dakota State University for three years beginning in 1963. On February 10, 1966, he became head coach at the school, setting the stage for another strong tenure, in which he put together a record of 61–7–1 in his seven years. Erhardt also served as the Bison athletic director, winning a pair of college national championships. In 1970, he was awarded Blue Key National Honor Society's Distinguished Educator award for his dedication to the university.

== National Football League career ==
=== New England Patriots ===
On March 14, 1973, Erhardt moved on to become backfield coach of the New England Patriots, a post he served in for four years before being promoted to offensive coordinator on February 1, 1977, following the departure of Red Miller. After missing the playoffs that year, the Patriots seemed ready to challenge for a Super Bowl berth in 1978. However, prior to the last regular season game on December 18, head coach Chuck Fairbanks announced he was leaving the team to accept a contract offer from the University of Colorado. In response, the team suspended Fairbanks and made Erhardt and fellow assistant Hank Bullough co-coaches for the final game. The Patriots dropped that contest, then lost their opening round matchup to the Houston Oilers.

Fairbanks was allowed to leave for Colorado, with Erhardt officially taking the reins of the team on April 6, 1979. Noting his .890 winning percentage at North Dakota State upon taking the position, Erhardt said, "I've never been a loser in football and I don't intend to start now." The Patriots underachieved to a 19–13 record in the 1979 and 1980 seasons, missing the playoffs by one game each year; the 441 points scored in 1980 was a club record not broken until 2007. But then the Patriots finished with a 2–14 record in 1981. Citing the fact that Erhardt "was just too nice a guy", owner Billy Sullivan dismissed him on December 22, two days after the conclusion of the season.

=== New York Giants ===
Just over a month later, in January 1982, Erhardt was hired as offensive coordinator of the New York Giants by head coach, and former fellow Patriots assistant Ray Perkins, the first since Joe Walton filled the position under head coach Alex Webster in 1973. During the latter portion of that first season, Perkins announced he was leaving to become head coach at the University of Alabama, with Bill Parcells replacing him. Parcells had been Erhardt's linebackers coach with the Patriots in 1980, and kept his former boss in the same position.

That decision would prove to be the right one as the Giants went on to win two Super Bowls, with Erhardt working around a key injury during the run toward Super Bowl XXV. Quarterback Phil Simms had suffered a season-ending injury late in the season, but his replacement, Jeff Hostetler, navigated the team to the title.

Parcells retired after that game, with Ray Handley being promoted to head coach. Erhardt was moved to assistant coach for the 1991 season with diminished responsibilities as Handley served as his own offensive coordinator. On January 7, 1992, Erhardt was dismissed by Handley.

=== Pittsburgh Steelers ===
Handley then demoted Erhardt, which resulted in the latter's departure for a similar position with the Pittsburgh Steelers in 1992. Emphasizing the run, Erhardt ran the offense for four years, helping the team reach Super Bowl XXX in 1996. However, after the season, the conflict over the offensive philosophy between Erhardt and Steelers' head coach Bill Cowher resulted in Erhardt's contract not being renewed, which was announced on January 31, 1996.

=== New York Jets ===
Erhardt then became offensive coordinator of the New York Jets under Rich Kotite. A disastrous 1–15 mark marked the end of Kotite's brief era, with Parcells replacing Kotite. In the 1997 season, Erhardt was stripped of his playcalling duties while serving as just quarterbacks coach. Erhardt announced his retirement on January 12, 1998.

== Head coaching record ==
=== College ===
Year	Team	Overall	Conference	Standing	Bowl/playoffs
North Dakota State Bison (North Central Conference) (1966–1972)
1966	North Dakota State	8–2	5–1	T–1st	
1967	North Dakota State	9–1	6–0	1st	L Pecan
1968	North Dakota State	10–0	6–0	1st	W Pecan
1969	North Dakota State	10–0	6–0	1st	W Camellia
1970	North Dakota State	9–0–1	6–0	1st	W Camellia
1971	North Dakota State	7–2	4–2	T–2nd	
1972	North Dakota State	8–2	6–1	T–1st	
North Dakota State:		61–7–1	39–4		
Total:		61–7–1			
National championship Conference title Conference division title or championship game berth

=== NFL ===
Team	Year	Regular season					Postseason			
Team	Year	Won	Lost	Ties	Win %	Finish	Won	Lost	Win %	Result
NE^	1978	0	1	0	.000	1st in AFC East	–	–	–	–
NE	1979	9	7	0	.563	2nd in AFC East	–	–	–	–
NE	1980	10	6	0	.625	2nd in AFC East	–	–	–	–
NE	1981	2	14	0	.125	5th in AFC East	–	–	–	–
NE Total		21	28	0	.429		–	–	–	
Total		21	28	0	.429		–	–	–	

^ Co-coach with Hank Bullough

== See also ==
- New England Patriots strategy
