= Terry Falcon =

American football player (born 1955)

No. 68, 63, 73
- Positions: Guard, tackle

Personal information
- Born: August 30, 1955 (age 71); Culbertson, Montana, U.S.
- Listed height: 6 ft 3 in (1.91 m)
- Listed weight: 260 lb (118 kg)

Career information
- College: Minot State; Montana
- NFL draft: 1978: 8th round, 198th overall pick

Career history
- New England Patriots (1978–1979); New York Giants (1980); Arizona Wranglers (1983)

Career NFL statistics
- Games played: 31
- Games started: 3
- Stats at Pro Football Reference

Terry Lee Falcon (born August 30, 1955) is an American former professional football player who was a guard and tackle in the National Football League (NFL). He played college football for the Minot State Beavers and Montana Grizzlies. He played in the NFL for the New England Patriots from 1978 to 1979 and the New York Giants in 1980.
