= Hank Bullough =

American football player and coach (1934–2019)

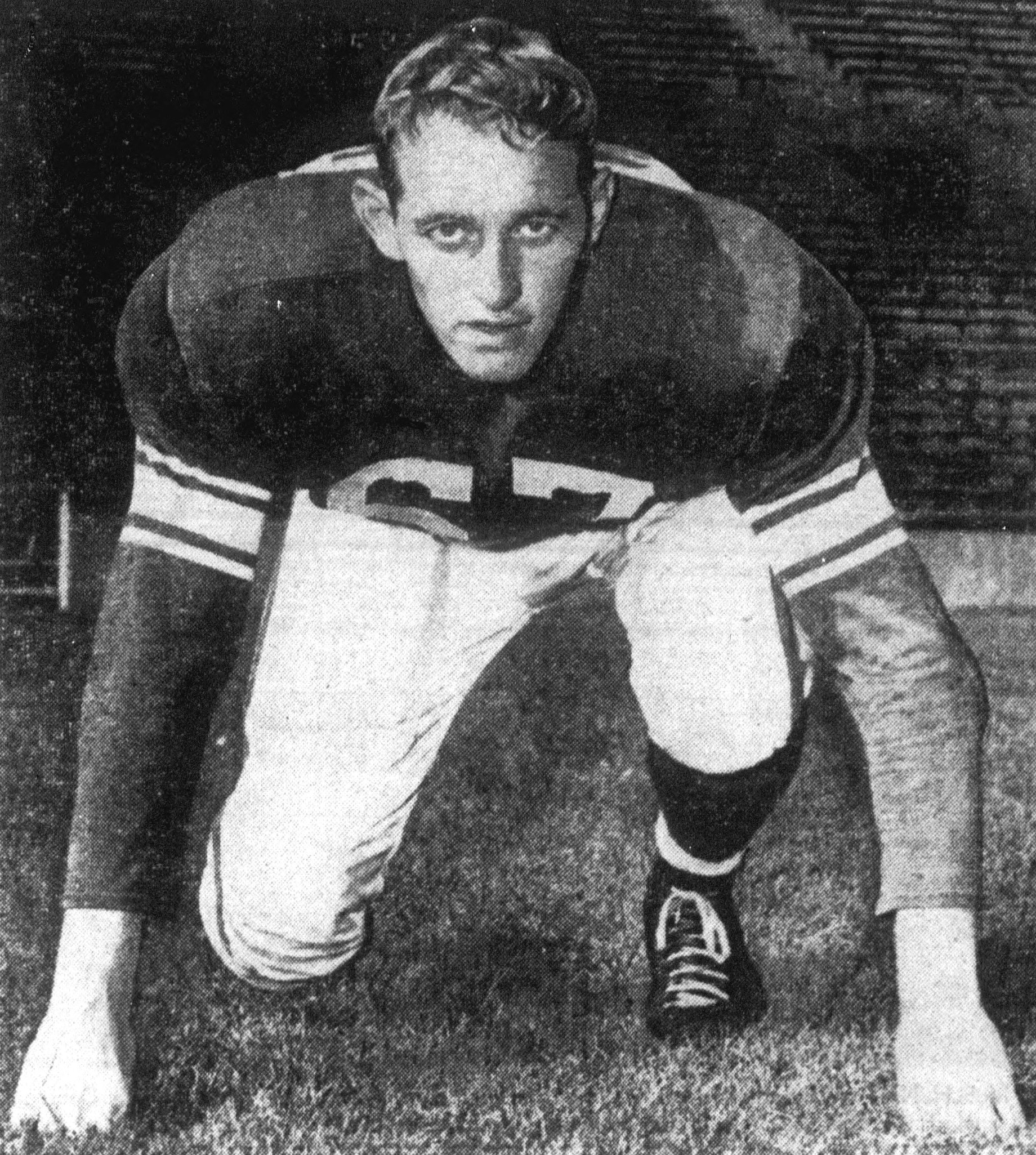
- Bullough, circa 1953

No. 67, 61
- Positions: Guard, linebacker

Personal information
- Born: January 24, 1934; Scranton, Pennsylvania, U.S.
- Died: November 24, 2019 (aged 85); Haslett, Michigan, U.S.
- Listed height: 6 ft 0 in (1.83 m)
- Listed weight: 230 lb (104 kg)

Career information
- High school: Timken (OH)
- College: Michigan State (1951–1954)
- NFL draft: 1955: 5th round, 53rd overall pick

Career history

Playing
- Green Bay Packers (1955, 1958)

Coaching
- Michigan State (1959–1969) Assistant coach; Baltimore Colts (1970–1972) Linebackers coach; New England Patriots (1973–1975) Defensive line coach; New England Patriots (1976–1977) Assistant head coach & defensive line coach; New England Patriots (1978–1979) Defensive coordinator; Cincinnati Bengals (1980–1983) Defensive coordinator & linebackers coach; Pittsburgh Maulers (1984) Head coach; Buffalo Bills (1984) Defensive coordinator; Buffalo Bills (1985–1986) Head coach; Green Bay Packers (1988–1991) Defensive coordinator; Detroit Lions (1993) Defensive coordinator; Michigan State (1994) Assistant Coach

Awards and highlights
- National champion (1952)

Career NFL statistics
- Games played: 20
- Games started: 8
- Fumble recoveries: 1
- Stats at Pro Football Reference

Head coaching record
- Regular season: 4–18–0 (.182)
- Coaching profile at Pro Football Reference

Henry Charles Bullough (January 24, 1934 – November 24, 2019) was an American professional football player and coach. He played college football at Michigan State and graduated in 1954. Bullough was a starting guard for the Spartans team that won the 1954 Rose Bowl. He was selected by the Green Bay Packers with the 53rd pick in the fifth round of the 1955 NFL draft.

== Coaching career ==
Bullough's first coaching position was at his alma mater, Michigan State, where he served for 11 seasons. In 1970, he became linebackers coach for the Baltimore Colts of the National Football League (NFL) under head coach Don McCafferty.

As defensive coordinator for the New England Patriots in the 1970s Bullough is credited, along with his college teammate Chuck Fairbanks, with having been a significant figure in bringing the 3–4 defense to the NFL. After Fairbanks was suspended prior to the final game of the 1978 season, Bullough's and fellow assistant Ron Erhardt were named co-head coaches for the remainder of the season. After the season, Patriots owner Billy Sullivan appointed Erhardt head coach instead of Bullough. Bullough would remain defensive coordinator for one more season with the Patriots.

In 1980, new Cincinnati Bengals head coach and former Green Bay Packers teammate, Forrest Gregg wooed Bullough to install the 3–4 defensive system in Cincinnati. Two seasons later the Bengals would go to the Super Bowl where they fell just short against the San Francisco 49ers. While with the Bengals, Bullough also tutored Dick LeBeau who, not only would succeed Bullough as defensive coordinator but, is credited as the innovator of the 3–4 zone blitz scheme.

Bullough followed Gregg to the Green Bay Packers as defensive coordinator in 1984. Before the season began, he was let out of his contract to become the head coach for the Pittsburgh Maulers of the United States Football League (USFL). The Maulers folded later that year, before Bullough ever coached a game.

He then moved on to the Buffalo Bills, where he replaced Kay Stephenson for the final 12 games of the 1985 season and remained head coach for the first nine games of the 1986 season before being fired. He then served again as defensive coordinator for the Packers under Lindy Infante from 1988 to 1991, and one season as defensive coordinator for the Detroit Lions in 1993. He then returned to college and took a position as an assistant coach under George Perles at Michigan State in 1994 in his final season.

== Personal life ==
Bullough was married to his wife of 49 years Lou Ann Bullough and they had three children together, Cheryl, Shane, and Chuck, and nine grandchildren, Corey, Kristi, Jake, Max, Riley, Byron, Holly, Chloe and Annika.

== Head coaching record ==
Team	Year	Regular season					Postseason			
Team	Year	Won	Lost	Ties	Win %	Finish	Won	Lost	Win %	Result
NE^	1978	0	1	0	.000	1st in AFC East	–	–	–	–
NE total		0	1	0	.000		–	–	–	
BUF	1985	2	10	0	.167	5th in AFC East	–	–	–	–
BUF	1986	2	7	0	.222	4th in AFC East	–	–	–	–
BUF total		4	17	0	.190		–	–	–	
Total		4	18	0	.182		–	–	–	

^ Co-coach with Ron Erhardt
