= Mike Patrick (American football) =

American football player (1952–2008)

No. 2
- Position: Punter

Personal information
- Born: September 6, 1952; Austin, Texas, U.S.
- Died: April 27, 2008 (aged 55); Biloxi, Mississippi, U.S.
- Listed height: 6 ft 0 in (1.83 m)
- Listed weight: 209 lb (95 kg)

Career information
- College: Mississippi State

Career history
- 1975–1978: New England Patriots

Awards and highlights
- New England Patriots All-1970s Team
- Stats at Pro Football Reference

Charles Michael Patrick (September 6, 1952 – April 27, 2008) was an American professional football player who was a punter for the New England Patriots of the National Football League (NFL) from 1975 to 1978. He was born in Austin, Texas, and graduated from Biloxi High School in Biloxi, Mississippi. He played college football for the Mississippi State Bulldogs. He died at age 55 in Biloxi.
