= Mike Hawkins (linebacker) =

American football player (born 1955)

No. 59, 57
- Position: Linebacker

Personal information
- Born: November 29, 1955 (age 70); Bay City, Texas, U.S.
- Listed height: 6 ft 2 in (1.88 m)
- Listed weight: 235 lb (107 kg)

Career information
- High school: Van Vleck (TX)
- College: Texas A&M–Kingsville
- NFL draft: 1978: 7th round, 188th overall pick

Career history
- New England Patriots (1978–1981); Los Angeles Raiders (1982)

Career NFL statistics
- Sacks: 12.5
- Interceptions: 5
- Touchdowns: 1
- Stats at Pro Football Reference

Michael Douglas Hawkins (born November 29, 1955) is an American former professional football player who was a linebacker for five seasons with the New England Patriots and Los Angeles Raiders of the National Football League (NFL). He played college football for the Texas A&M–Kingsville Javelinas.
