= Bill Matthews (American football) =

American football player (born 1956)

No. 53
- Position: Linebacker

Personal information
- Born: March 12, 1956 (age 70); Santa Monica, California, U.S.
- Listed height: 6 ft 2 in (1.88 m)
- Listed weight: 235 lb (107 kg)

Career information
- High school: Wessington High School
- College: South Dakota State (1974–1977)
- NFL draft: 1978: 5th round, 129th overall pick

Career history
- New England Patriots (1979–1981); Denver Gold (1984)

Career NFL statistics
- Fumble recoveries: 1
- Interceptions: 1
- Stats at Pro Football Reference

William Marvin Matthews (born March 12, 1956) is an American former professional football player who was a linebacker in the National Football League (NFL) who played for the New England Patriots. He played college football for the South Dakota State Jackrabbits.
