= Bob Cryder =

American football player (born 1956)

No. 75, 78
- Positions: Guard, tackle

Personal information
- Born: September 7, 1956 (age 70); East St. Louis, Illinois, U.S.
- Listed height: 6 ft 5 in (1.96 m)
- Listed weight: 275 lb (125 kg)

Career information
- High school: O'Fallon Township (IL)
- College: Alabama
- NFL draft: 1978: 1st round, 18th overall pick

Career history
- New England Patriots (1978–1983); Seattle Seahawks (1984–1986)

Awards and highlights
- Jacobs Blocking Trophy (1977)

Career NFL statistics
- Games played: 107
- Games started: 60
- Fumble recoveries: 4
- Stats at Pro Football Reference

Robert Cryder (born September 7, 1956) is an American former professional football player who was an offensive guard in the National Football League (NFL) from 1978 to 1986. Cryder currently resides in Quincy, Washington. He played college football for the University of Alabama.
