= Dwight Wheeler =

American football player (born 1955)

No. 62, 67, 71, 63
- Position: Offensive tackle

Personal information
- Born: January 13, 1955 (age 71); Memphis, Tennessee, U.S.
- Listed height: 6 ft 3 in (1.91 m)
- Listed weight: 269 lb (122 kg)

Career information
- High school: Manassas (TN)
- College: Tennessee State
- NFL draft: 1978: 4th round, 102nd overall pick

Career history
- New England Patriots (1978–1983); Los Angeles Raiders (1984); San Diego Chargers (1987); Los Angeles Raiders (1987–1988)

Career NFL statistics
- Games played: 91
- Games started: 44
- Stats at Pro Football Reference

Dwight Wheeler (born January 13, 1955) is an American former professional football player who was an offensive tackle in the National Football League (NFL) from 1978 to 1988.
