= Andy Johnson (American football) =

American football player (1952–2018)

No. 32
- Position: Running back

Personal information
- Born: October 18, 1952; Athens, Georgia, U.S.
- Died: May 16, 2018 (aged 65); Athens, Georgia, U.S.
- Listed height: 6 ft 0 in (1.83 m)
- Listed weight: 204 lb (93 kg)

Career information
- College: Georgia
- NFL draft: 1974: 5th round, 112th overall pick

Career history
- New England Patriots (1974–1982); Boston Breakers (1983)

Awards and highlights
- Second-team All-SEC (1971)

Career NFL statistics
- Rushing attempts: 491
- Rushing yards: 2,017
- Receptions: 161
- Receiving yards: 1,807
- Total TDs: 22
- Stats at Pro Football Reference

Anderson Sidney Johnson (October 18, 1952 – May 16, 2018) was an American professional football player who was a running back for the New England Patriots of the National Football League (NFL) during the 1970s and 80s. He played college football for the Georgia Bulldogs. He was selected in the fifth round of the 1974 NFL draft.

== Education ==
He was a 1970 graduate of Athens High School, now Clarke Central High School, in Athens, Georgia, where he played quarterback. He then attended the University of Georgia.

== Sports career ==
Johnson earned Georgia football and baseball letters in 1971, 1972, & 1973. He played quarterback as a sophomore, leading the Bulldogs to an 11–1 record, passing for 341 yards and rushing for 870 yards. In 1973, he passed for 506 yards for the season. He had 431 rush attempts for 1799 yards during his Georgia career becoming one of the top five SEC rushing quarterbacks for a career. He played shortstop for the Georgia baseball team.

He was drafted by the New England Patriots in 1974 in the 5th round of the NFL draft, pick 112 overall. He played running back with the Patriots from 1974 to 1981. Johnson's best season was in 1976 when he scored 10 total touchdowns and had 1,042 combined yards of rushing and receiving while the Patriots finished 2nd in the AFC East which was good enough for a playoff spot. In his game against the Raiders in the Divisional round, he rushed for 32 yards on 14 carries with one touchdown, though they lost the game 24-21 amid dubious penalty calling. His productivity declined after the 1978 season, a season in which he was one of four players on the team who rushed for over 500 yards (Sam Cunningham, Horace Ivory and quarterback Steve Grogan). Over the next four seasons, he rushed for only 159 yards combined. He played one season with the Boston Breakers of the USFL before retiring. He was named to the New England Patriots All-1970s Team in 2009.

He was a 1996 inductee into the Georgia Sports Hall of Fame and 2000 inductee into the Athens Athletic Hall of Fame. He was vice-president of the Georgia Lettermen's Club.

== Death ==
Johnson died on May 16, 2018, age 65, from a lengthy undisclosed illness. He is survived by his wife Charlotte and their three children.
