= John Hannah (American football) =

American football player (born 1951)

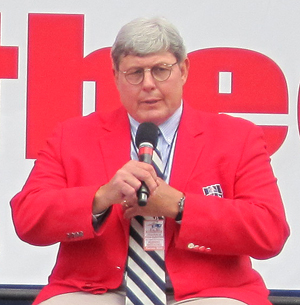
- Hannah in 2010

No. 73
- Position: Guard

Personal information
- Born: April 4, 1951 (age 75); Canton, Georgia, U.S.
- Listed height: 6 ft 2 in (1.88 m)
- Listed weight: 265 lb (120 kg)

Career information
- High school: Albertville (Albertville, Alabama)
- College: Alabama (1970–1972)
- NFL draft: 1973: 1st round, 4th overall pick

Career history
- New England Patriots (1973–1985)

Awards and highlights
- 7× First-team All-Pro (1976, 1978–1981, 1983, 1985); 3× Second-team All-Pro (1977, 1982, 1984); 9× Pro Bowl (1976, 1978–1985); NFL 1970s All-Decade Team; NFL 1980s All-Decade Team; NFL 75th Anniversary All-Time Team; NFL 100th Anniversary All-Time Team; New England Patriots All-1970s Team; New England Patriots All-1980s Team; New England Patriots 35th Anniversary Team; New England Patriots 50th Anniversary Team; New England Patriots No. 73 retired; New England Patriots Hall of Fame; Unanimous All-American (1972); First-team All-American (1971); Jacobs Blocking Trophy (1972); 2× First-team All-SEC (1971, 1972); Second-team All-SEC (1970); SEC All-Time Team (1982); First-team AP All-Time All-American (2025)

Career NFL statistics
- Games played: 183
- Games started: 183
- Fumble recoveries: 10
- Stats at Pro Football Reference
- Pro Football Hall of Fame
- College Football Hall of Fame

John Allen Hannah (born April 4, 1951), is an American former football guard who played in the National Football League (NFL) for 13 seasons with the New England Patriots. Nicknamed "Hog", he is considered one of the greatest offensive linemen of all time.

Hannah played college football for the Alabama Crimson Tide, winning the Jacobs Blocking Trophy in 1972. He was selected fourth overall in the 1973 NFL draft by the Patriots, where he received nine Pro Bowl and seven first-team All-Pro selections. Hannah was inducted to the Pro Football Hall of Fame in 1991 and the College Football Hall of Fame in 1999. The same year as the former, he became the inaugural inductee of the New England Patriots Hall of Fame.

== Early life ==
Hannah was born in Canton, Georgia, the son of an NFL player, Herbert "Herb" Hannah, who also played for the University of Alabama as an offensive lineman.

Hannah was raised in Albertville, Alabama, and participated in high school football, wrestling and track at Baylor School in Chattanooga, Tennessee. He won an individual national championship in wrestling at the National Prep Championship in 1967. His high school coach in football, wrestling and track was Luke Worsham, whom Hannah credited in his induction speech at the Pro Football Hall of Fame: "I want to talk to you about Major Luke Worsham who was my high school coach. He is the guy who really taught me and showed me what love was all about. Because he would shoulder my problems, he would always stand by me to offer me encouragement when things got tough and when things were going awry he would make sure he would correct me and get me right back on track." Hannah played his senior season of high school football at Albertville High School, where he graduated in 1969.

== College career ==
Hannah played tackle and guard for the Crimson Tide at the University of Alabama under Coach Paul "Bear" Bryant from 1970 to 1972. He earned All-American honors twice, in 1971 and was a Consensus All-American his senior year in 1972. During his tenure Hannah was part of an SEC championship-winning team. He was named to the University of Alabama All-Century Team and also to the Alabama 1970s All-Decade team. During his time at Alabama, he also participated in wrestling, the shot put, and the discus throw. Hannah was inducted into the College Football Hall of Fame in 1999. Bryant would later say that Hannah was the greatest lineman he ever coached. He graduated from the University of Alabama with B.A. degree in journalism.

== Professional career ==
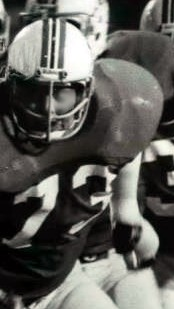
Hannah with the Patriots, circa 1976

Hannah was selected by the New England Patriots as the fourth overall pick in the first round of the 1973 NFL draft. He played his entire professional career in New England. While considered somewhat short by NFL standards, Hannah made up for this with great speed and quickness as well as powerful legs. Hannah excelled as a pass protector, as a run blocker, and as the pulling guard on sweeps. Hannah's commitment to football was very high and he expected the same from each of his teammates, sometimes becoming quite angry if he felt they were not complying. Hannah started the first 13 games of his rookie season of 1973 until a freak leg injury forced him to miss the final game of the year. Along with tackle Leon Gray, the two formed what was generally considered the best guard/tackle tandem in the NFL during the mid to late 1970s. Gray and Hannah also combined with tight end Russ Francis to form one of the strongest left-side trios in the league. Hannah anchored the 1978 offensive line that set an NFL record with 3,165 rushing yards. The record breaking rushing attack of New England did not have a single 1,000 rusher, but did have four players run for more than 500 yards including quarterback Steve Grogan. The team rushing record would eventually be broken by the Baltimore Ravens some four decades later, but the 1978 Patriots also set a league record with 181 rushing first-downs, which still stands as of 2022.

Hannah missed only five games out of a possible 191 because of injuries during his career. He also missed the first three games of the 1977 season when he and Gray held out because of contract disputes. In the 1985 season Hannah helped guide the team to its first AFC title and Super Bowl appearance. Hannah retired from the NFL after playing in Super Bowl XX.

Hannah was named to ten consecutive All-Pro teams (1976–1985), and was named All-AFC 11 times (1974, 1976–1985). He was also selected to play in 9 Pro Bowls. He was voted the Seagram's Seven Crowns of Sports Offensive Lineman of the Year in 1978 and 1980 and won the NFLPA/Coca-Cola Offensive Lineman of the Year Award (voted on by NFL players) three times in four years (1978–1979, 1981). Hannah was also the winner of the Mack Truck Award for offensive line play five consecutive times (1977–81). He is also one of the few players to have been named to two different NFL All-Decade Teams (for the 1970s and 1980s). In 1994, he was then selected to the NFL 75th Anniversary All-Time Team as the #1 guard on the team. In 2019, Hannah was then selected to the NFL 100th Anniversary All-Time Team.

In 1991, he became the first Patriots player inducted into the Pro Football Hall of Fame. In 1999, he was ranked number 20 on The Sporting News' list of the 100 Greatest Football Players, the highest-ranking Patriot, the highest-ranking guard, and the second-ranked offensive lineman behind Anthony Muñoz. In 1991, he became the first player to be inducted into the New England Patriots Hall of Fame.

== Coaching career ==
Hannah became an assistant coach at Governor Dummer Academy in Massachusetts, leaving to accept the head coaching job at Somerville High School in 2004. While concurrently serving as the city's youth development coordinator, Hannah led the Somerville team through one winless season. He left to become a special assistant coach at his alma mater, Baylor School in Chattanooga, Tennessee, in 2005. He resigned from his coaching position at the conclusion of Baylor's 2005 football season.

== Personal life ==
Hannah's brothers, Charley and David, were also All-Conference linemen for the Alabama Crimson Tide. Charley played in the NFL from 1977 to 1988 for the Tampa Bay Buccaneers and the Los Angeles Raiders. He was a member of the Super Bowl XVIII winning Raiders.

In the summer of 1972 after his junior year, Hannah married his high school sweetheart, Page Pickens, an Alabama cheerleader. They later had a son and a daughter, who were raised in Boston.
