= Horace Ivory =

American football player (born 1954)

No. 23, 32
- Position: Running back

Personal information
- Born: August 8, 1954 (age 72); Fort Worth, Texas, U.S.
- Listed height: 6 ft 0 in (1.83 m)
- Listed weight: 197 lb (89 kg)

Career information
- High school: Nolan (Fort Worth)
- College: Oklahoma
- NFL draft: 1977: 2nd round, 44th overall pick

Career history
- New England Patriots (1977–1981); Seattle Seahawks (1981-1982)

Awards and highlights
- 2× National champion (1974, 1975)

Career NFL statistics
- Rushing attempts: 351
- Rushing yards: 1,425
- Rushing TDs: 15
- Stats at Pro Football Reference

Horace Orlando Ivory (born August 8, 1954) is an American former professional football player who was a running back in the National Football League (NFL) from 1977 through 1982. He attended Nolan Catholic High School from 1968 to 1972 where he was a TCIL All-State running back. He was offered a scholarship to play college football for the Notre Dame Fighting Irish, but for academic reasons, went to Navarro Junior College before transferring to the Oklahoma Sooners program for his junior and senior seasons.

Ivory was a member of two national championship teams while at the University of Oklahoma. He rushed for 1390 yds on 213 carries in his 22 games with the Sooners (6.5 avg).

He was selected in the second round of the 1977 NFL draft by the New England Patriots. Ivory was named to the NFL All-Pro team as a kick returner after the 1980 season with the Patriots.
