= 1973 New England Patriots season =

Season of National Football League team the New England Patriots

- Owner: Billy Sullivan
- General manager: Chuck Fairbanks
- Head coach: Chuck Fairbanks
- Home stadium: Schaefer Stadium

Results
- Record: 5–9
- Division place: 3rd AFC East
- Playoffs: Did not qualify
- All-Pros: None
- Pro Bowlers: None

The 1973 New England Patriots season was the franchise's fourth season in the National Football League and 14th overall. The Patriots ended the season with a record of five wins and nine losses and a third place finish in the AFC East Division. It was the first year under head coach and general manager Chuck Fairbanks, hired in January after six seasons as head coach of the Oklahoma Sooners.

Selections in the 1973 NFL draft included John Hannah, Sam Cunningham, Ray Hamilton, and Darryl Stingley. The assistant coaches on offense included future NFL head coaches Ron Erhardt, Sam Rutigliano, and Red Miller.

== Offseason ==
=== NFL draft ===
1973 New England Patriots draft
Round	Pick	Player	Position	College	Notes
1	4	John Hannah * ^{†}	Guard	Alabama	
1	11	Sam Cunningham *	Fullback	USC	
1	19	Darryl Stingley	Wide receiver	Purdue	
3	57	Brad Dusek	Defensive back	Texas A&M	
5	108	Doug Dumler	Center	Nebraska	
8	186	Isaac Brown	Running back	Western Kentucky	
9	212	David Callaway	Tackle	Texas A&M	
10	238	Dan Ruster	Defensive back	Oklahoma	
11	264	Homer May	Tight end	Texas A&M	
12	290	Bruce Barnes	Punter	UCLA	
13	316	Adam Lowry	Defensive back	Texas	
14	342	Ray Hamilton	Defensive end	Oklahoma	
15	368	Condie Pugh	Running back	Norfolk State	
16	394	Mike Kutter	Defensive end	Concordia Moorhead	
17	420	Eddie McAshan	Quarterback	Georgia Tech	
Made roster † Pro Football Hall of Fame * Made at least one Pro Bowl during career

== Staff ==
1973 New England Patriots staff
Front office: President – Billy Sullivan; Assistant general manager – Peter Hadhazy; Director of player personnel – Bucko Kilroy; Administrative assistant to the head coach – Phil Bengtson; Head coaches: General manager/head coach – Chuck Fairbanks; Offensive coaches: Quarterbacks – Bill Nelsen; Offensive backfield – Ron Erhardt; Receivers – Sam Rutigliano; Offensive line – Red Miller	Defensive coaches: Defensive line – Hank Bullough; Linebackers – Charlie Sumner; Defensive backs – Larrye Weaver; Special teams coaches: Special teams – Jim Valek

== Roster ==
1973 New England Patriots roster
Quarterbacks (QB): 14 Brian Dowling; 16 Jim Plunkett; 11 Dick Shiner; Running backs (RB): 31 Josh Ashton; 39 Sam Cunningham; 42 Mack Herron; 24 Bob McCall; 36 John Tarver; Wide receivers (WR): -- Edesel Garrison; 33 Reggie Rucker; 84 Darryl Stingley; 18 Randy Vataha; Tight ends (TE): 80 Bob Adams; -- John Mosier; 86 Bob Windsor	Offensive linemen (OL): 61 Sam Adams T; 78 Willie Banks G; 58 Doug Dumler C; 70 Leon Gray T; 73 John Hannah G; 67 Bill Lenkaitis C; 77 Tom Neville T; 60 Len St. Jean G; Defensive linemen (DL): 85 Julius Adams DT; 63 Rick Cash DE; -- Ron Fernandes DE; 71 Ray Hamilton DE; 72 Mel Lunsford DT; 75 Arthur Moore DT; 76 Dave Rowe DT; 65 Donnell Smith DE	Linebackers (LB): 51 Ron Acks OLB; 50 Edgar Chandler MLB; 59 Bob Geddes MLB; -- Carl Johnson OLB; 57 Steve Kiner OLB; 52 Steve King OLB; 53 John Tanner OLB; Defensive backs (DB): 49 Ralph Anderson FS; 27 Ron Bolton CB; 29 Greg Boyd SS; 22 Sandy Durko SS; 23 George Hoey CB; 38 Don Martin CB; 28 Dave Mason FS; Special teams (ST): 3 Bruce Barnes P; 2 Jeff White K	Reserve: 66 Nate Dorsey DE (IR); 55 Will Foster LB (IR); 64 Allen Gallaher T (IR); -- Steve Harkey RB (DNR); 56 Jon Morris C (IR); 30 Wayne Patrick RB (IR); -- Bill Peterson OLB (IR); 59 Brian Stenger LB (IR); 43 Claxton Welch RB (IR); Rookies in italics

== Regular season ==
=== Schedule ===
Week	Date	Opponent	Result	Record	Venue	Attendance	Game Recap
1	September 16	**Buffalo Bills**	**L** 13–31	0–1	Schaefer Stadium	56,119	Recap
2	September 23	Kansas City Chiefs	**L** 7–10	0–2	Schaefer Stadium	57,918	Recap
3	September 30	at **Miami Dolphins**	**L** 23–44	0–3	Miami Orange Bowl	62,508	Recap
4	October 7	**Baltimore Colts**	**W** 24–16	1–3	Schaefer Stadium	57,044	Recap
5	October 14	**New York Jets**	**L** 7–9	1–4	Schaefer Stadium	58,659	Recap
6	October 21	at Chicago Bears	**W** 13–10	2–4	Soldier Field	47,643	Recap
7	October 28	**Miami Dolphins**	**L** 14–30	2–5	Schaefer Stadium	57,617	Recap
8	November 4	at Philadelphia Eagles	**L** 23–24	2–6	Veterans Stadium	65,070	Recap
9	November 11	at **New York Jets**	**L** 13–33	2–7	Shea Stadium	51,034	Recap
10	November 18	Green Bay Packers	**W** 33–24	3–7	Schaefer Stadium	60,525	Recap
11	November 25	at Houston Oilers	**W** 32–0	4–7	Astrodome	27,344	Recap
12	December 2	San Diego Chargers	**W** 30–14	5–7	Schaefer Stadium	58,150	Recap
13	December 9	at **Buffalo Bills**	**L** 13–37	5–8	Rich Stadium	72,470	Recap
14	December 16	at **Baltimore Colts**	**L** 13–18	5–9	Memorial Stadium	52,065	Recap
Note: Intra-division opponents are in **bold** text.

=== Standings ===
AFC East
	W	L	T	PCT	DIV	CONF	PF	PA	STK
Miami Dolphins	12	2	0	.857	7–1	9–2	343	150	W1
Buffalo Bills	9	5	0	.643	6–2	7–4	259	230	W4
New England Patriots	5	9	0	.357	1–7	3–8	258	300	L2
New York Jets	4	10	0	.286	4–4	4–7	240	306	L2
Baltimore Colts	4	10	0	.286	2–6	2–9	226	341	W2
