= 1974 New England Patriots season =

Season of National Football League team the New England Patriots

- Owner: Billy Sullivan
- General manager: Chuck Fairbanks
- Head coach: Chuck Fairbanks
- Home stadium: Schaefer Stadium

Results
- Record: 7–7
- Division place: T-3rd AFC East
- Playoffs: Did not qualify
- All-Pros: None
- Pro Bowlers: None

The 1974 New England Patriots season was the franchise's fifth season in the National Football League and 15th overall. The Patriots ended the season with a record of seven wins and seven losses and finished tied for third in the AFC East Division. The Pats stunned the two-time defending Super Bowl champion Miami Dolphins in Week 1 at Schaefer Stadium. The Pats went on to win their first five games on their way to a 6–1 start. However, they struggled in the second half of the season, winning only one game and finishing with a 7–7 record.

== Offseason ==
=== NFL draft ===
1974 New England Patriots draft
Round	Pick	Player	Position	College	Notes
2	30	Steve Corbett	Guard	Boston College	
2	34	Steve Nelson	Linebacker	North Dakota State	
5	112	Andy Johnson	Running back	Georgia	
5	124	Charles Battle	Defensive end	Grambling	
6	141	Chuck Ramsey	Kicker	Wake Forest	
7	178	Maury Damkroger	Linebacker	Nebraska	
9	209	Ed McCartney	Linebacker	Northeastern State (OK)	
11	268	Archie Gibson	Running back	Utah State	
12	296	Eddie Foster	Tackle	Oklahoma	
13	321	Phil Bennett	Running back	Boston College	
14	346	Cecil Bowens	Running back	Kentucky	
15	374	Sam Hunt	Linebacker	Stephen F. Austin	
16	399	Lucious Selmon	Defensive tackle	Oklahoma	
17	424	Gary Hudson	Defensive back	Boston College	
Made roster * Made at least one Pro Bowl during career

== Staff ==
1974 New England Patriots staff
Front office: President – Robert L. Marr; Executive vice president – George Sargent; Assistant general manager – Peter Hadhazy; Director of player personnel – Bucko Kilroy; Personnel executive assistant – J. I. Albrecht; Administrative assistant to the head coach – Phil Bengtson; Head coaches: General manager/head coach – Chuck Fairbanks; Assistant head coach/defensive line – Hank Bullough; Offensive coaches: Quarterbacks – Bill Nelsen; Running backs – Ron Erhardt; Receivers – Ray Perkins; Offensive Line – Red Miller	Defensive coaches: Linebackers – Charlie Sumner; Defensive backs – Larrye Weaver; Special teams coaches: Special teams – Jim Valek

== Roster ==
1974 New England Patriots roster
Quarterbacks (QB): 15 Neil Graff; 16 Jim Plunkett; 11 Dick Shiner; Running backs (RB): 38 Noe Gonzalez; 42 Mack Herron; 30 Ed Jenkins; 32 Andy Johnson; 36 John Tarver; 23 Joe Wilson; Wide receivers (WR): 82 Eddie Hinton; 88 Al Marshall; 81 Joe Sweet; 18 Randy Vataha; Tight ends (TE): 80 Bob Adams	Offensive linemen (OL): 61 Sam Adams G; 68 Bill DuLac G; 58 Doug Dumler C; 64 Allen Gallaher T; 70 Leon Gray T; 73 John Hannah G; 67 Bill Lenkaitis C; 56 Jon Morris C; 77 Tom Neville T; Defensive linemen (DL): 85 Julius Adams DE; 71 Ray Hamilton NT; 74 Craig Hanneman DE; 72 Mel Lunsford DE; 78 Tony McGee DE; 65 Donnell Smith DE	Linebackers (LB): 59 Rodrigo Barnes ILB; 51 Kent Carter OLB; 54 Gail Clark OLB; 55 Will Foster ILB; 50 Sam Hunt ILB; 52 Steve King OLB; 53 John Tanner OLB; 57 Steve Nelson ILB; 90 George Webster OLB; Defensive backs (DB): 27 Ron Bolton CB; 22 Sandy Durko SS; 34 Prentice McCray FS; 40 Dave McCurry FS; 45 Jack Mildren SS; 41 Ken Pope CB; 25 Deac Sanders; Special teams (ST): 10 David Chapple P; 1 John Smith K	Reserve: 31 Josh Ashton RB (IR); 62 Steve Corbett G (IR); 39 Sam Cunningham RB (IR); 51 Maury Damkroger LB (IR); 59 Bob Geddes LB (IR); 63 Shelby Jordan T (IR); 47 Jim Massey CB (IR); 24 Bob McCall RB (IR); 75 Arthur Moore NT (IR); 33 Reggie Rucker WR (IR); 87 Steve Schubert WR (IR); 84 Darryl Stingley WR (IR); -- Ernie Webster G (IR); 86 Bob Windsor TE (IR); Rookies in italics

== Regular season ==
The Patriots posted their first non-losing season since 1966, finishing 7–7. They erupted to a 5–0 start before losing seven of their last nine games due to injuries and rising strength of opponents as the season went on. A league-wide player strike during training camp and preseason allowed a large number of new players to make the squad, as coach Chuck Fairbanks was installing a new offensive system.

=== Schedule ===
Week	Date	Opponent	Result	Record	Venue	Attendance	Game Recap
1	September 15	**Miami Dolphins**	**W** 34–24	1–0	Schaefer Stadium	55,006	Recap
2	September 22	at New York Giants	**W** 28–20	2–0	Yale Bowl	44,082	Recap
3	September 29	Los Angeles Rams	**W** 20–14	3–0	Schaefer Stadium	61,279	Recap
4	October 6	**Baltimore Colts**	**W** 42–3	4–0	Schaefer Stadium	59,502	Recap
5	October 13	at **New York Jets**	**W** 24–0	5–0	Shea Stadium	57,825	Recap
6	October 20	at **Buffalo Bills**	**L** 28–30	5–1	Rich Stadium	78,935	Recap
7	October 27	at Minnesota Vikings	**W** 17–14	6–1	Metropolitan Stadium	48,177	Recap
8	November 3	**Buffalo Bills**	**L** 28–29	6–2	Schaefer Stadium	61,279	Recap
9	November 10	Cleveland Browns	**L** 14–21	6–3	Schaefer Stadium	61,279	Recap
10	November 17	**New York Jets**	**L** 16–21	6–4	Schaefer Stadium	57,115	Recap
11	November 24	at **Baltimore Colts**	**W** 27–17	7–4	Memorial Stadium	34,782	Recap
12	December 1	at Oakland Raiders	**L** 26–41	7–5	Oakland Coliseum	50,120	Recap
13	December 8	Pittsburgh Steelers	**L** 17–21	7–6	Schaefer Stadium	52,107	Recap
14	December 15	at **Miami Dolphins**	**L** 27–34	7–7	Miami Orange Bowl	56,920	Recap
Note: Intra-division opponents are in **bold** text.

=== Standings ===
AFC East
	W	L	T	PCT	DIV	CONF	PF	PA	STK
Miami Dolphins	11	3	0	.786	6–2	9–2	327	216	W3
Buffalo Bills	9	5	0	.643	5–3	7–4	264	244	L2
New York Jets	7	7	0	.500	4–4	5–6	279	300	W6
New England Patriots	7	7	0	.500	4–4	4–7	348	289	L3
Baltimore Colts	2	12	0	.143	1–7	1–10	190	329	L4

== Notable games ==
- September 15 vs. Miami Dolphins:

The Patriots ended a four-game losing streak to Miami, erupting to a 31–10 third quarter lead and cruising home 34–24. Mack Herron opened the season for the Patriots with a fourteen-yard rushing touchdown in the first quarter, while Jim Plunkett had a touchdown throw to Reggie Rucker and a five-yard rushing score to go with Sam Cunningham's 13-yard rushing score.

- September 22 vs. New York Giants at Yale:

The Patriots traveled to New Haven, Connecticut to face the Giants. Norm Snead of the Giants opened the scoring with a 21-yard touchdown to Ron Johnson; the Patriots answered with a 12-yarder from Jim Plunkett to Mack Herron, both scores coming in the first quarter. In the second Joe Dawkins of the Giants punched the ball in from one yard out, and the Patriots tied the game as Plunkett found Randy Vataha from 38 yards out. New England then took over as Sam Cunningham caught a 14-yard Plunkett pass and Herron later ran in a four-yard score. Johnson caught another touchdown from Snead in the fourth quarter but the PAT was stopped and the Patriots ended the game 28–20 winners.

- October 20 at Buffalo Bills:

The Bills ended the Patriots' five-game winning streak 30–28. O. J. Simpson had one rushing touchdown and a catch from Joe Ferguson, who also completed touchdown throws to Paul Seymour. Sam Cunningham had three rushing scores and Jim Plunkett fired a 12-yard touchdown bullet to Reggie Rucker with nine seconds left. The Bills recovered the ensuing onside kick to preserve the win.

- October 27 at Minnesota Vikings:

With both teams entering the game at 5–1, turnovers plagued the day at Metropolitan Stadium. Jim Plunkett was picked off twice and the Patriots fumbled twice, while Fran Tarkenton had three picks. The Patriots also had nine penalties eating up 122 yards as the Vikings erased an early 10–0 New England lead and led 14–10 in the final minute; Tarkenton ran in a late touchdown, then threw the ball into the face of Ron Bolton after he tripped on a camera cable and mistakenly believed Bolton tripped him; a brief brawl ensued and both Bolton and Tarkenton were ejected. But Jim Plunkett drove the Pats down field and fired a ten-yard game-winning touchdown to Bob Windsor on the final play; Windsor had to break numerous tackles to reach the endzone and was injured for the season as a result.

- November 3 vs. Buffalo Bills:

The Patriots and Bills squared off in another hard-fought affair as Joe Ferguson threw for 247 yards and a touchdown to Ahmad Rashad while O. J. Simpson was held in check until late in the first half with a touchdown. Jim Plunkett threw two touchdowns to Mack Herron and Sam Cunningham rushed in another score for a 21–19 Patriots half time lead, but the Bills struck first in the third quarter when Dave Washington picked off Plunkett and ran back 72 yards for the score. Another Mack Herron score and John Leypoldt's third field goal of the day left the score 29–28 in the final minute when the Patriots drove down field for a field goal, but the kick was blocked by Jeff Yeates of the Bills, preserving the win.
