= 1972 New England Patriots season =

Season of National Football League team the New England Patriots

- Owner: Billy Sullivan
- General manager: Upton Bell (fired); Peter Hadhazy (interim)
- Head coach: John Mazur (fired); Phil Bengtson (interim)
- Home stadium: Schaefer Stadium

Results
- Record: 3–11
- Division place: 5th AFC East
- Playoffs: Did not qualify
- All-Pros: None
- Pro Bowlers: None

Uniform

The 1972 New England Patriots season was the franchise's third season in the National Football League and 13th overall. The Patriots ended the season with a record of three wins and eleven losses and finished last in the AFC East Division.

The Patriots continued their period of futility as they slumped to another horrendous record, and missed the playoffs for the ninth straight season. After being embarrassed 31–7 in their home opener against Cincinnati, the Patriots would win their next two games against Atlanta and eventual NFC champion Washington. However, the Patriots would continue their mid-season misery, losing nine consecutive games to slide to 2–10 before winning their first (and only) road game against the New Orleans Saints, who went 2–11–1.

New England went winless against AFC opponents. Out of their 11 losses, only two were by one possession, a 24–17 loss to Baltimore in the Patriots' first Monday Night Football appearance and a 27–24 loss to Buffalo. The worst of these losses was a 52–0 thrashing by the eventual Super Bowl champions, the Miami Dolphins, who would go on to achieve the only undefeated season in NFL history. That Dolphins loss remains the worst loss and most points ever allowed in a game in Patriots history.

Although they won three games, the 1972 Patriots had the second-worst point differential (minus-254) of any team in a 14-game NFL season, ahead of only the expansion 1976 Buccaneers. The 1972 Patriots had the franchise's worst point differential until the 1990 team was outscored by 265 points (181–446) in a 1–15 season. They lost eight of their fourteen games by three touchdowns or more, and their first two wins were by a single point. Jim Plunkett and reserve quarterbacks combined for only 10 touchdown passes with 28 interceptions, and were sacked 44 times. The defense allowed 5,250 total yards and ranked last in the league. Pro Football Reference argues that the 1970 and 1972 Patriots were, owing to the more difficult schedule faced by the 1990 team, the weakest Patriot teams ever, and rivalled only by the 1991 Colts and 2009 Rams as the weakest team by an established franchise since the NFL–AFL merger. The team drafted John Hannah before the next season to bolster the offensive line.

== Draft ==
1972 New England Patriots draft
Round	Pick	Player	Position	College	Notes
2	49	Tom Reynolds	Wide receiver	San Diego State	
3	73	Jim White	Defensive end	Colorado State	
5	124	Ron Bolton	Defensive back	Norfolk State	
7	165	Clark Hoss	Tight end	Oregon State	
7	166	John Tarver	Running back	Colorado	
8	195	Steve Beyrle	Guard	Kansas State	
9	220	Mike Kelson	Offensive tackle	Arkansas	
10	245	Mel Caraway	Defensive back	Northwestern Oklahoma State	
11	269	Rodney Cason	Offensive tackle	Angelo State	
12	296	Steve Booras	Defensive end	Mesa Jr. College	
13	325	Sam Elmore	Defensive back	Eastern Michigan	
14	350	Ed Rideout	Wide receiver	Boston College	
15	375	Joel Klime	Tight end	Pittsburgh	
16	400	Eric Dahl	Defensive back	San Jose State	
17	424	Dick Graham	Wide receiver	Oklahoma State	
17	425	Junior Ah You	Linebacker	Arizona State	Played for the Montreal Alouettes in the CFL between 1972 and 1981.
Made roster † Pro Football Hall of Fame * Made at least one Pro Bowl during career

== Staff ==
1972 Boston Patriots staff
Front office: President – Billy Sullivan; Assistant General Manager/Interim General Manager – Peter Hadhazy; Director of Player Personnel – Bucko Kilroy; Director of Pro Scouting – Rommie Loudd; Head coaches: Head Coach – John Mazur; Interim Head Coach – Phil Bengtson; Offensive coaches: Offensive Coordinator – Sam Rutigliano; Receivers – Jerry Stoltz; Offensive Line – Bruce Beatty	Defensive coaches: Defensive Coordinator – Dick Evans; Linebackers – John Meyer; Defensive Backfield – Tom Fletcher; Special teams coaches: Special Teams – Burnie Miller

== Roster ==
1972 New England Patriots roster
Quarterbacks (QB): 14 Brian Dowling; 16 Jim Plunkett; Running backs (RB): 31 Josh Ashton; 30 Carl Garrett; 40 Jack Maitland; 35 Henry Matthews; 36 John Tarver; Wide receivers (WR): 21 Tom Reynolds; 33 Reggie Rucker; 18 Randy Vataha; Tight ends (TE): 82 Tom Beer; 86 Bob Windsor	Offensive linemen (OL): 61 Sam Adams G; 65 Conway Hayman G; 67 Bill Lenkaitis G/C; 64 Mike Montler G/T; 56 Jon Morris C; 74 Bob Reynolds T; 60 Len St. Jean G; Defensive linemen (DL): 85 Julius Adams DT/DE; 88 Ron Berger DE; 63 Rick Cash DT; 62 Halvor Hagen DE; 76 Dave Rowe DT; 70 Dennis Wirgowski DE	Linebackers (LB): 51 Ron Acks OLB; 49 Dick Blanchard OLB; 50 Jim Cheyunski MLB; 55 Ralph Cindrich MLB; 52 Ron Kadziel OLB; 66 Ed Weisacosky OLB; Defensive backs (DB): 27 Ron Bolton CB; 41 Larry Carwell CB; 25 Rickie Harris FS; 23 George Hoey CB; 29 Honor Jackson SS; 28 Art McMahon SS; 44 John Outlaw CB; Special teams (ST): 2 Pat Studstill P; 12 Mike Walker K	Practice squad: 11 Steve Goepel QB; 45 Danny Hardaway RB; 83 Charles McKee WR; Reserve: 78 Willie Banks G (IR); -- Steve Booras DE (IR); 84 Hubie Bryant WR (IR); 19 Mel Caraway CB (Left squad); 7 Charlie Gogolak K (IR); 77 Tom Neville T (IR); 58 Homer Post DT (IR); 54 Kenny Price LB (IR); 26 Clarence Scott S (IR); 87 Jim White DE (IR); Rookies in italics

== Regular season ==
=== Schedule ===
Week	Date	Opponent	Result	Record	Venue	Attendance
1	September 17	Cincinnati Bengals	**L** 7–31	0–1	Schaefer Stadium	60,999
2	September 24	Atlanta Falcons	**W** 21–20	1—1	Schaefer Stadium	60,999
3	October 1	Washington Redskins	**W** 24–23	2–1	Schaefer Stadium	60,999
4	October 8	at **Buffalo Bills**	**L** 14–38	2—2	War Memorial Stadium	41,749
5	October 15	**New York Jets**	**L** 13–41	2–3	Schaefer Stadium	60,999
6	October 22	at Pittsburgh Steelers	**L** 3–33	2–4	Three Rivers Stadium	46,081
7	October 29	at **New York Jets**	**L** 10–34	2–5	Shea Stadium	62,867
8	November 6	**Baltimore Colts**	**L** 17–24	2–6	Schaefer Stadium	60,999
9	November 12	at **Miami Dolphins**	**L** 0–52	2–7	Miami Orange Bowl	80,010
10	November 19	**Buffalo Bills**	**L** 24–27	2–8	Schaefer Stadium	60,999
11	November 26	at **Baltimore Colts**	**L** 0–31	2–9	Memorial Stadium	54,907
12	December 3	**Miami Dolphins**	**L** 21–37	2–10	Schaefer Stadium	60,999
13	December 10	at New Orleans Saints	**W** 17–10	3–10	Tulane Stadium	64,889
14	December 17	at Denver Broncos	**L** 21–45	3–11	Mile High Stadium	51,656
Note: Intra-division opponents are in **bold** text.

=== Game summaries ===
==== Week 1 vs Bengals ====
Week One: Cincinnati Bengals (0–0) at New England Patriots (0–0)

Quarter	1	2	3	4	Total
**Bengals**	7	3	7	14	**31**
Patriots	0	7	0	0	**7**

at Schaefer Stadium, Foxboro, Massachusetts

- Date: September 17, 1972
- Game time: 1:00 p.m. EST
- Game weather: 74 °F or 23.3 °C • Wind 19 miles per hour (31 km/h; 17 kn)
- Game attendance: 60,999
- Box Score

Game information

First quarter

- CIN – Essex Johnson 14-yard run (Horst Muhlmann kick). Bengals 7–0.

Second quarter

- CIN – Horst Muhlmann 38-yard field goal. Bengals 10–0.
- NE – Larry Carwell 45-yard blocked field goal return (Mike Walker kick). Bengals 10–7.

Third quarter

- CIN – Jess Phillips 1-yard run (Horst Muhlmann kick). Bengals 17–7. Drive:

Fourth quarter

- CIN – Lemar Parrish 51-yard punt return (Horst Muhlmann kick). Bengals 24–7.
- CIN – Bob Trumpy 11-yard pass from Ken Anderson (Horst Muhlmann kick). Bengals 31–7. Drive:

Top passers

- CIN – Ken Anderson – 10/15, 102 yards, TD
- NE – Jim Plunkett – 9/17, 117 yards, 2 INT

Top rushers

- CIN – Essex Johnson – 15 rushes, 82 yards, TD
- NE – Carl Garrett – 12 rushes, 34 yards

Top receivers

- CIN – Chip Myers – 3 receptions, 42 yards
- NE – Carl Garrett – 1 reception, 35 yards

==== Week 3 vs Redskins ====
Week Three: Washington Redskins (2–0) at New England Patriots (1–1)

Quarter	1	2	3	4	Total
Redskins	0	14	0	9	**23**
**Patriots**	0	7	10	7	**24**

at Schaefer Stadium, Foxboro, Massachusetts

- Date: October 1, 1972
- Game time: 1:00 p.m. EST
- Game weather: 54 °F or 12.2 °C; wind 14 miles per hour (23 km/h; 12 kn)
- Referee: John McDonough

Game information

First quarter

- No scoring plays

Second quarter

- WAS – Charley Taylor 30 yard pass from Billy Kilmer (Curt Knight kick). Redskins 7–0.
- WAS – Charley Taylor 4 yard pass from Billy Kilmer (Curt Knight kick). Redskins 14–0.
- NE – Josh Ashton 2 yard run (Charlie Gogolak kick). Redskins 14–7.

Third quarter

- NE – Reggie Rucker 11 yard pass from Jim Plunkett (Charlie Gogolak kick). 14–14.
- NE – Charlie Gogolak 42 yard field goal. Patriots 17–14.

Fourth quarter

- WAS – Jerry Smith 9 yard pass from Billy Kilmer (Curt Knight kick). Redskins 21–17.
- NE – Josh Ashton 24 yard pass from Jim Plunkett (Charlie Gogolak kick). Patriots 24–21.
- WAS – Safety; Malinchak blocked punt through end zone. Patriots 24–23.

Top passers

- WAS – Billy Kilmer – 14/30, 213 yards, 3 TD, INT
- NE – Jim Plunkett – 17/33, 255 yards, 2 TD

Top rushers

- WAS – Larry Brown – 20 rushes, 113 yards
- NE – Josh Ashton – 23 rushes, 108 yards, 1 TD

Top receivers

- WAS – Charley Taylor – 7 receptions, 134 yards, 2 TD
- NE – Reggie Rucker – 4 receptions, 69 yards, 1 TD

== Standings ==
AFC East
	W	L	T	PCT	DIV	CONF	PF	PA	STK
Miami Dolphins	14	0	0	1.000	8–0	11–0	385	171	W14
New York Jets	7	7	0	.500	6–2	6–5	367	324	L2
Baltimore Colts	5	9	0	.357	4–4	5–6	235	252	L2
Buffalo Bills	4	9	1	.321	2–6	2–9	257	377	W1
New England Patriots	3	11	0	.214	0–8	0–11	192	446	L1
