= List of New England Patriots seasons =

Seasons of the New England Patriots

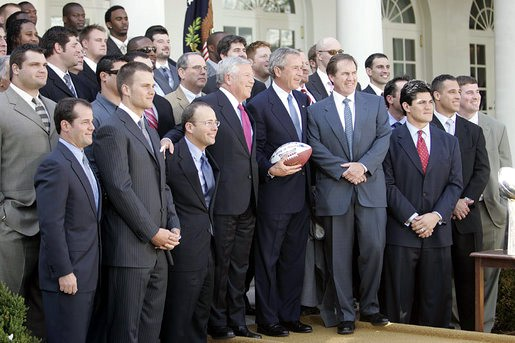
Members of the Patriots organization pose with then-U.S. President George W. Bush following the Patriots' victory in Super Bowl XXXIX in 2005.

The New England Patriots are a professional American football team based in the Greater Boston town of Foxborough, Massachusetts. They play in the National Football League (NFL) as a member club of the league's American Football Conference (AFC) East division. Originally called the Boston Patriots, the team was founded as one of eight charter members of the American Football League (AFL) in 1960 under the ownership of Billy Sullivan. The team became part of the NFL when the two leagues merged in 1970. The following year, they moved from Boston to nearby Foxborough, and changed their name to the New England Patriots.

The modern NFL championship game, the Super Bowl, was founded in the 1966 season; the first four were contested between the champions of the AFL and the NFL. After the merger, the Super Bowl became the united league's championship. The Patriots made the 1963 AFL Championship Game, but struggled severely in the early years of the united league, not making the postseason until 1976. After a stretch of only one losing season in 13 years, including a Super Bowl appearance against a champion Bears outfit, the Patriots reached a nadir between 1989 and 1993 when they won only 19 of 80 games.

During Bill Belichick's tenure as the team's head coach from 2000 to 2023, the Patriots won six Super Bowls, nine AFC Championship Games, and sixteen AFC East titles, earning an overall regular season record of 266–121. Tom Brady, who was the team's quarterback from 2000 until 2019, was awarded the NFL Most Valuable Player (MVP) three times, and the Super Bowl Most Valuable Player four times (he later won another Super Bowl MVP with the Buccaneers); he is one of only five players named Super Bowl MVP more than once, and the only one named more than three times.

The Patriots have won six Super Bowl championships (XXXVI, XXXVIII, XXXIX, XLIX, LI, and LIII). They also played in and lost Super Bowls XX, XXXI, XLII, XLVI, LII, and LX. During the 2007 regular season, the Patriots became the only NFL team in history to win 16 games, and the first since the 1972 Miami Dolphins (in a 14-game season) to complete the regular campaign undefeated. Belichick's Patriots are one of only two teams to win three Super Bowls in four years (the other being the Dallas Cowboys from 1993 to 1996).

Overall, the Patriots have made 29 playoff appearances, one of which was before the merger. Since the merger, they have played sixteen AFC Championship Games, winning twelve of them to advance to the Super Bowl. In the 2025 NFL season, the Patriots reached their 12th Super Bowl, breaking their own record for most Super Bowl appearances by any organization of all time. The Patriots had 19 consecutive winning seasons from 2001 to 2019, the 2nd-longest streak in NFL history, behind the Dallas Cowboys' record of 20.

== Seasons ==
AFL champions (1960–1969)	Super Bowl champions (1966–present)	Conference champions	Division champions	Wild Card berth	One-Game Playoff Berth

Season^{[a]}	Team^{[a]}	League	Conference	Division	Regular season^{[a]}				Postseason results	Awards^{[Key]}	Head coaches
Season^{[a]}	Team^{[a]}	League	Conference	Division	Finish	W	L	T	Postseason results	Awards^{[Key]}	Head coaches
Boston Patriots
1960	1960	AFL	—	Eastern	4th	5	9	0			Lou Saban
1961	1961	AFL	—	Eastern	2nd	9	4	1			Lou Saban (2–3) Mike Holovak (7–1–1)
1962	1962	AFL	—	Eastern	2nd	9	4	1			Mike Holovak
1963	1963	AFL	—	Eastern	1st	7	6	1	Won Divisional playoffs (at Bills) 26–8; Lost AFL Championship (at Chargers) 10–51		Mike Holovak
1964	1964	AFL	—	Eastern	2nd	10	3	1		Gino Cappelletti (MVP)	Mike Holovak
1965	1965	AFL	—	Eastern	3rd	4	8	2			Mike Holovak
1966	1966	AFL	—	Eastern	2nd	8	4	2		Jim Nance (MVP)	Mike Holovak
1967	1967	AFL	—	Eastern	5th	3	10	1			Mike Holovak
1968	1968	AFL	—	Eastern	4th	4	10	0			Mike Holovak
1969	1969	AFL	—	Eastern	3rd	4	10	0			Clive Rush
1970	1970	NFL	AFC	East	5th	2	12	0			Clive Rush (1–6) John Mazur (1–6)
New England Patriots
1971	1971	NFL	AFC	East	3rd	6	8	0			John Mazur
1972	1972	NFL	AFC	East	5th	3	11	0			John Mazur (2–7) Phil Bengtson (1–4)
1973	1973	NFL	AFC	East	3rd	5	9	0			Chuck Fairbanks
1974	1974	NFL	AFC	East	3rd	7	7	0^{[b]}			Chuck Fairbanks
1975	1975	NFL	AFC	East	5th	3	11	0			Chuck Fairbanks
1976	1976	NFL	AFC	East	2nd^{[c]}	11	3	0	Lost Divisional playoffs (at Raiders) 21–24	Mike Haynes (DROY)	Chuck Fairbanks
1977	1977	NFL	AFC	East	3rd	9	5	0			Chuck Fairbanks
1978^{[d]}	1978	NFL	AFC	East	1st^{[e]}	11	5	0	Lost Divisional playoffs (Oilers) 14–31		Chuck Fairbanks
1979	1979	NFL	AFC	East	2nd	9	7	0			Ron Erhardt
1980	1980	NFL	AFC	East	2nd	10	6	0			Ron Erhardt
1981	1981	NFL	AFC	East	5th	2	14	0			Ron Erhardt
1982	1982	NFL	AFC	^{[f]}	7th	5	4	0	Lost First Round playoffs (at Dolphins) 13–28		Ron Meyer
1983	1983	NFL	AFC	East	2nd	8	8	0			Ron Meyer
1984	1984	NFL	AFC	East	2nd	9	7	0			Ron Meyer (5–3) Raymond Berry (4–4)
1985	1985	NFL	AFC	East	3rd	11	5	0	Won Wild Card playoffs (at Jets) 26–14; Won Divisional playoffs (at Raiders) 27–20; Won AFC Championship (at Dolphins) 31–14; Lost Super Bowl XX (vs. Bears) 10–46		Raymond Berry
1986	1986	NFL	AFC	East	1st	11	5	0	Lost Divisional playoffs (at Broncos) 17–22		Raymond Berry
1987^{[g]}	1987	NFL	AFC	East	2nd	8	7	0			Raymond Berry
1988	1988	NFL	AFC	East	3rd	9	7	0		John Stephens (OROY)	Raymond Berry
1989	1989	NFL	AFC	East	4th	5	11	0			Raymond Berry
1990	1990	NFL	AFC	East	5th	1	15	0			Rod Rust
1991	1991	NFL	AFC	East	4th	6	10	0		Leonard Russell (OROY)	Dick MacPherson
1992	1992	NFL	AFC	East	5th	2	14	0			Dick MacPherson
1993	1993	NFL	AFC	East	4th	5	11	0			Bill Parcells
1994	1994	NFL	AFC	East	2nd^{[h]}	10	6	0	Lost Wild Card playoffs (at Browns) 13–20	Bill Parcells (COY)	Bill Parcells
1995	1995	NFL	AFC	East	4th	6	10	0		Curtis Martin (OROY)	Bill Parcells
1996	1996	NFL	AFC	East	1st	11	5	0	Won Divisional playoffs (Steelers) 28–3; Won AFC Championship (Jaguars) 20–6; Lost Super Bowl XXXI (vs. Packers) 21–35		Bill Parcells
1997	1997	NFL	AFC	East	1st	10	6	0	Won Wild Card playoffs (Dolphins) 17–3; Lost Divisional playoffs (at Steelers) 6–7		Pete Carroll
1998	1998	NFL	AFC	East	4th	9	7	0	Lost Wild Card playoffs (at Jaguars) 10–25		Pete Carroll
1999	1999	NFL	AFC	East	5th	8	8	0			Pete Carroll
2000	2000	NFL	AFC	East	5th	5	11	0			Bill Belichick
2001	2001	NFL	AFC	East	1st^{[i]}	11	5	0	Won Divisional playoffs (Raiders) 16–13 (OT); Won AFC Championship (at Steelers) 24–17; Won Super Bowl XXXVI (1) (vs. Rams) 20–17	Tom Brady (SB MVP)	Bill Belichick
2002	2002	NFL	AFC	East	2nd^{[j]}	9	7	0			Bill Belichick
2003	2003	NFL	AFC	East	1st	14	2	0	Won Divisional playoffs (Titans) 17–14; Won AFC Championship (Colts) 24–14; Won Super Bowl XXXVIII (2) (vs. Panthers) 32–29	Tom Brady (SB MVP); Bill Belichick (COY); Scott Pioli (EOY)	Bill Belichick
2004	2004	NFL	AFC	East	1st	14	2	0	Won Divisional playoffs (Colts) 20–3; Won AFC Championship (at Steelers) 41–27; Won Super Bowl XXXIX (3) (vs. Eagles) 24–21	Deion Branch (SB MVP); Scott Pioli (EOY)	Bill Belichick
2005	2005	NFL	AFC	East	1st	10	6	0	Won Wild Card playoffs (Jaguars) 28–3; Lost Divisional playoffs (at Broncos) 13–27	Tedy Bruschi (CBPOY)	Bill Belichick
2006	2006	NFL	AFC	East	1st	12	4	0	Won Wild Card playoffs (Jets) 37–16; Won Divisional playoffs (at Chargers) 24–21; Lost AFC Championship (at Colts) 34–38		Bill Belichick
2007	2007	NFL	AFC	East	1st	16	0	0	Won Divisional playoffs (Jaguars) 31–20; Won AFC Championship (Chargers) 21–12; Lost Super Bowl XLII (vs. Giants) 14–17	Tom Brady (MVP, OPOY); Bill Belichick (COY)	Bill Belichick
2008	2008	NFL	AFC	East	2nd^{[k]}	11	5	0		Jerod Mayo (DROY)	Bill Belichick
2009	2009	NFL	AFC	East	1st	10	6	0	Lost Wild Card playoffs (Ravens) 14–33	Tom Brady (CBPOY)	Bill Belichick
2010	2010	NFL	AFC	East	1st	14	2	0	Lost Divisional playoffs (Jets) 21–28	Tom Brady (MVP, OPOY); Bill Belichick (COY)	Bill Belichick
2011	2011	NFL	AFC	East	1st	13	3	0	Won Divisional playoffs (Broncos) 45–10; Won AFC Championship (Ravens) 23–20; Lost Super Bowl XLVI (vs. Giants) 17–21		Bill Belichick
2012	2012	NFL	AFC	East	1st	12	4	0	Won Divisional playoffs (Texans) 41–28; Lost AFC Championship (Ravens) 13–28		Bill Belichick
2013	2013	NFL	AFC	East	1st	12	4	0	Won Divisional playoffs (Colts) 43–22; Lost AFC Championship (at Broncos) 16–26		Bill Belichick
2014	2014	NFL	AFC	East	1st	12	4	0	Won Divisional playoffs (Ravens) 35–31; Won AFC Championship (Colts) 45–7; Won Super Bowl XLIX (4) (vs. Seahawks) 28–24	Rob Gronkowski (CBPOY); Tom Brady (SB MVP)	Bill Belichick
2015	2015	NFL	AFC	East	1st	12	4	0	Won Divisional playoffs (Chiefs) 27–20; Lost AFC Championship (at Broncos) 18–20		Bill Belichick
2016	2016	NFL	AFC	East	1st	14	2	0	Won Divisional playoffs (Texans) 34–16; Won AFC Championship (Steelers) 36–17; Won Super Bowl LI (5) (vs. Falcons) 34–28 (OT)	Tom Brady (SB MVP)	Bill Belichick
2017	2017	NFL	AFC	East	1st	13	3	0	Won Divisional playoffs (Titans) 35–14; Won AFC Championship (Jaguars) 24–20; Lost Super Bowl LII (vs. Eagles) 33–41	Tom Brady (MVP)	Bill Belichick
2018	2018	NFL	AFC	East	1st	11	5	0	Won Divisional playoffs (Chargers) 41–28; Won AFC Championship (at Chiefs) 37–31 (OT); Won Super Bowl LIII (6) (vs. Rams) 13–3	Julian Edelman (SB MVP)	Bill Belichick
2019	2019	NFL	AFC	East	1st	12	4	0	Lost Wild Card playoffs (Titans) 13–20	Stephon Gilmore (DPOY)	Bill Belichick
2020	2020	NFL	AFC	East	3rd	7	9	0			Bill Belichick
2021	2021	NFL	AFC	East	2nd	10	7	0	Lost Wild Card playoffs (at Bills) 17–47		Bill Belichick
2022	2022	NFL	AFC	East	3rd	8	9	0			Bill Belichick
2023	2023	NFL	AFC	East	4th	4	13	0			Bill Belichick
2024	2024	NFL	AFC	East	4th	4	13	0			Jerod Mayo
2025	2025	NFL	AFC	East	1st	14	3	0	Won Wild Card playoffs (Chargers) 16–3; Won Divisional playoffs (Texans) 28–16; Won AFC Championship (at Broncos) 10–7; Lost Super Bowl LX (vs. Seahawks) 13–29	Mike Vrabel (COY); Josh McDaniels (ACOY)	Mike Vrabel
Total						559	449	9	All-time regular season record (1960–2025)		
Total						40	23	—	All-time postseason record (1960–2025)		
Total						599	472	9	All-time regular & postseason record (1960–2025)		

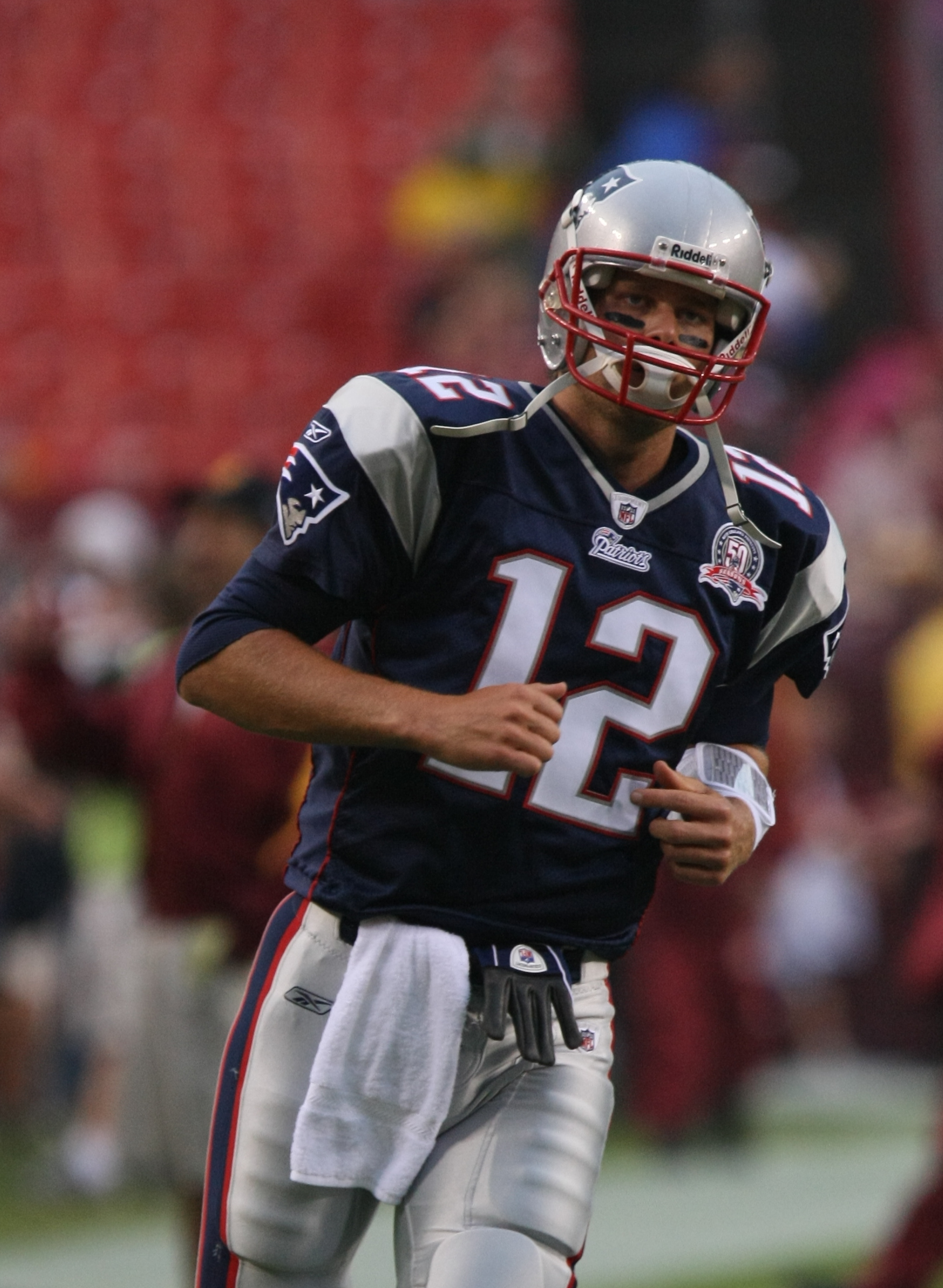
Tom Brady has three times been named the NFL's Most Valuable Player, and four times a Super Bowl Most Valuable Player with the Patriots

Key for the "Awards" section^{Key}
ASG MVP	American Football League All-Star Game Most Valuable Player Award
CBPOY	National Football League Comeback Player of the Year Award
DROY	National Football League Defensive Rookie of the Year Award
OROY	National Football League Offensive Rookie of the Year Award
COY	National Football League Coach of the Year Award
OPOY	National Football League Offensive Player of the Year Award
DPOY	National Football League Defensive Player of the Year Award
MVP	National Football League Most Valuable Player Award
SB MVP	Super Bowl Most Valuable Player Award

== See also ==
- History of the New England Patriots

== Notes ==
- ^{a} The season column links to an article about each season in the league (AFL for 1960–1969; NFL for 1970–present). The Team column links to an article about the Patriots' season that year. The Finish, Won, Lost, and Ties columns list regular season results and exclude any postseason play. Regular season and postseason results are combined only at the bottom of the list. In the Finish column, a "T-" indicates a tie for that position.
- ^{b} Beginning in 1974, the NFL began playing a 15-minute sudden-death overtime period if a regular season game finished regulation tied. Since this change, ties have been rarer.
- ^{c} The Patriots and the Baltimore Colts finished tied. However, the Colts finished ahead of New England based on a better division record (7–1 to Patriots' 6–2).
- ^{d} The NFL expanded from a 14-game regular season schedule to 16 beginning in 1978.
- ^{e} The Patriots and Miami Dolphins finished the 1978 season with the same record. However, the Patriots were awarded the Division Championship based on a better division record (6–2 to the Dolphins' 5–3).
- ^{f} The 1982 NFL season was shortened from 16 regular seasons games to nine due to a players' strike. For playoff seedings, division standings were ignored and eight teams from each conference were seeded one through eight based on their regular season records.
- ^{g} The 1987 NFL season was shortened from 16 regular season games to 15 due to a players' strike.
- ^{h} The Patriots and Dolphins finished the 1994 season tied. As the Dolphins had defeated the Patriots in both regular season meetings, the Dolphins were named division champions and the Patriots received a Wild Card berth in the playoffs.
- ^{i} The Patriots and the Dolphins finished the 2001 season with the same record. However, the Patriots were named Division Champions based on a better division record (6–2 to the Dolphins' 5–3).
- ^{j} The Patriots, Dolphins, and New York Jets finished the season with 9–7 records in 2002. For having the best record against common opponents, the Jets were awarded the division championship. Neither the Patriots nor the Dolphins qualified for the playoffs.
- ^{k} The Patriots, Dolphins, and Baltimore Ravens (AFC North) finished the 2008 season tied with identical 11–5 records. As the Dolphins and Ravens had 8–4 records within the AFC, and the Patriots a 7–5 AFC record, the Dolphins were awarded the AFC East title, and the Ravens were given a Wild Card berth in the playoffs. The Patriots did not qualify for the playoffs.
- ^{l} Years here refer to the year in which the season was played. Playoff games are commonly played in the January and February of the following year.
