= 1971 New England Patriots season =

Season of National Football League team the New England Patriots

- Owner: Billy Sullivan
- General manager: Upton Bell
- Head coach: John Mazur
- Home stadium: Schaefer Stadium

Results
- Record: 6–8
- Division place: T-3rd AFC East
- Playoffs: Did not qualify
- All-Pros: None
- Pro Bowlers: None

Uniform

The 1971 New England Patriots season was the franchise's second season in the National Football League and 12th overall. The 1971 season was the first that the team played as the New England Patriots, changing their name from the Boston Patriots, briefly to the Bay State Patriots before changing it again to the New England Patriots, in an effort to regionalize the franchise's equal distance from Boston and Providence.

The Patriots finished with six wins and eight losses, third place in the AFC East Division. It was the first season the Patriots played in the new Schaefer Stadium in Foxborough, Massachusetts, after playing in three different stadiums the previous three seasons in Boston.

During training camp, the Dallas Cowboys traded disgruntled running back Duane Thomas to the Patriots for Carl Garrett and Halvor Hagen on July 31. Thomas became embroiled in a conflict with head coach John Mazur, prompting Patriots general manager Upton Bell to request that Commissioner Pete Rozelle void the trade three days after it had been made. Rozelle granted Bell's request; Thomas and Garrett returned to their former teams, while Hagen remained in New England.

== Offseason ==
=== NFL draft ===
1971 New England Patriots draft
Round	Pick	Player	Position	College	Notes
1	1	Jim Plunkett	QB	Stanford	
Made roster † Pro Football Hall of Fame * Made at least one Pro Bowl during career

== Staff ==
1971 New England Patriots staff
Front office: President – Billy Sullivan; General Manager – Upton Bell; Assistant General Manager – Peter Hadhazy; Director of Player Personnel – Bucko Kilroy; Director of Pro Scouting – Rommie Loudd; Head coaches: Head Coach – John Mazur; Offensive coaches: Offensive Coordinator/Backs – Sam Rutigliano; Receivers – Jerry Stoltz; Offensive Line – Bruce Beatty	Defensive coaches: Defensive Coordinator/Line – Dick Evans; Linebackers – John Meyer; Defensive Backfield – Tom Fletcher

== Roster ==
1971 New England Patriots roster
Quarterbacks (QB): 16 Jim Plunkett; 17 Mike Taliaferro; Running backs (RB): 30 Carl Garrett; 24 Bob Gladieux; 40 Jack Maitland; 35 Jim Nance; Wide receivers (WR): 45 Hubie Bryant; 10 Eric Crabtree; 33 Reggie Rucker; 34 Ron Sellers; 18 Randy Vataha; Tight ends (TE): 82 Tom Beer; 86 Roland Moss	Offensive linemen (OL): 62 Halvor Hagen G; 76 Mike Haggerty T; 67 Bill Lenkaitis C/G; 64 Mike Montler T; 56 Jon Morris C; 77 Tom Neville T; 60 Len St. Jean G; Defensive linemen (DL): 85 Julius Adams DT; 73 Bill Atessis DE; 88 Ron Berger DT/DE; 87 Ike Lassiter DE; 71 Art May DE; 76 Dave Rowe DT	Linebackers (LB): 50 Jim Cheyunski MLB; 51 Randy Edmunds OLB; 52 Ed Philpott OLB; 54 Kenny Price MLB; 60 Steve Kiner OLB; 66 Ed Weisacosky OLB; Defensive backs (DB): 27 Randy Beverly CB; 41 Larry Carwell CB; 25 Rickie Harris SS; 21 Tom Janik P/FS; 38 Perry Pruett CB; 44 John Outlaw CB; 42 Don Webb FS; Special teams (ST): 7 Charlie Gogolak K	Practice squad: 61 Sam Adams G; 14 Brian Dowling QB; 37 Ron Gardin CB; 29 Honor Jackson CB; 74 Layne McDowell T; Reserve: 65 Houston Antwine DT (IR); 78 Hank Barton DE (IR); 53 Dennis Coleman LB (IR); 83 Dave Hardt DE (IR); 23 Daryl Johnson CB (IR); 32 Odell Lawson RB (IR); -- Rich Moore DT (IR); 28 Art McMahon S (IR); 47 Jerry Murtaugh LB (IR); 81 Ara Person TE (Ret.); 26 Clarence Scott S (IR); 13 Alfred Sykes WR (IR); 55 J. R. Williamson LB (IR); 70 Dennis Wirgowski DE (IR); Rookies in italics

== Regular season ==
=== Schedule ===
Week	Date	Opponent	Result	Record	Venue	Recap
1	September 19	Oakland Raiders	**W** 20–6	1–0	Schaefer Stadium	Recap
2	September 26	Detroit Lions	**L** 7–34	1–1	Schaefer Stadium	Recap
3	October 3	**Baltimore Colts**	**L** 3–23	1–2	Schaefer Stadium	Recap
4	October 10	**New York Jets**	**W** 20–0	2–2	Schaefer Stadium	Reacp
5	October 17	at **Miami Dolphins**	**L** 3–41	2–3	Miami Orange Bowl	Recap
6	October 24	at Dallas Cowboys	**L** 21–44	2–4	Texas Stadium	Recap
7	October 31	at San Francisco 49ers	**L** 10–27	2–5	Candlestick Park	Recap
8	November 7	Houston Oilers	**W** 28–20	3–5	Schaefer Stadium	Recap
9	November 14	**Buffalo Bills**	**W** 38–33	4–5	Schaefer Stadium	Recap
10	November 21	at Cleveland Browns	**L** 7–27	4–6	Cleveland Stadium	Recap
11	November 28	at **Buffalo Bills**	**L** 20–27	4–7	War Memorial Stadium	Recap
12	December 5	**Miami Dolphins**	**W** 34–13	5–7	Schaefer Stadium	Recap
13	December 12	at **New York Jets**	**L** 6–13	5–8	Shea Stadium	Recap
14	December 19	at **Baltimore Colts**	**W** 21–17	6–8	Memorial Stadium	Recap
Note: Intra-division opponents are in **bold** text.

=== Standings ===
AFC East
	W	L	T	PCT	DIV	CONF	PF	PA	STK
Miami Dolphins	10	3	1	.769	5–3	7–3–1	315	174	W1
Baltimore Colts	10	4	0	.714	6–2	8–3	313	140	L1
New England Patriots	6	8	0	.429	4–4	6–5	238	325	W1
New York Jets	6	8	0	.429	4–4	6–5	212	299	W2
Buffalo Bills	1	13	0	.071	1–7	1–10	184	394	L3

Note: Tie games were not officially counted in the standings until 1972.
