= List of New England Patriots head coaches =

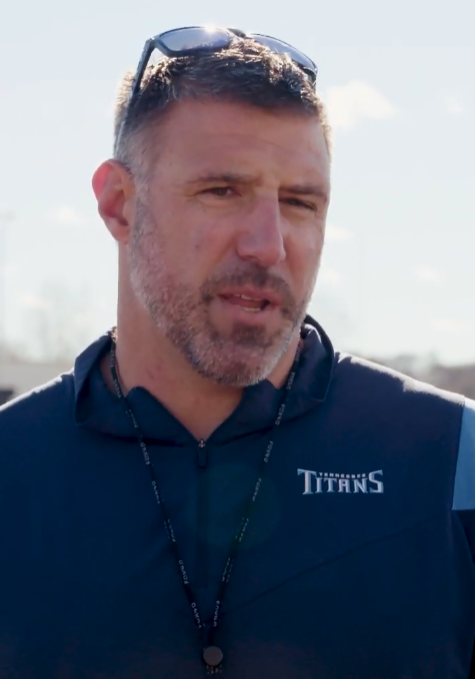
Mike Vrabel, the current head coach of the Patriots, also played for the team as a linebacker from 2001 to 2008.

The New England Patriots are a professional American football team based in Foxborough, Massachusetts. They are a member of the East Division of the American Football Conference (AFC) in the National Football League (NFL). The team began as the Boston Patriots in the American Football League, a league which merged with the National Football League before the 1970 season.

There have been 16 head coaches for the Patriots franchise. Lou Saban became the first coach of the Patriots in 1960, although he was fired partway through their second season. The 16th and current head coach is Mike Vrabel, who was hired on January 12, 2025. He is the second coach in the club's history to have played for the team (2001–2008). Longtime head coach Bill Belichick led the team for more regular season games (387), post-season games (41) and complete seasons (24) than any other head coach. His 266 wins with the Patriots are far and away the most in franchise history, more than five times those of runner-up Mike Holovak. Belichick also led the team to nine of their eleven Super Bowl appearances, winning six of them. Holovak, Raymond Berry and Bill Parcells all led the Patriots to league championship games, with only one (Holovak) failing to reach the Super Bowl. Five Patriots head coaches, Holovak, Chuck Fairbanks, Berry, Parcells, and Belichick have been named coach of the year by at least one major news organization. Additionally, Raymond Berry and Bill Parcells are members of the Pro Football Hall of Fame, with Berry being inducted in 1973, and Parcells in 2013.

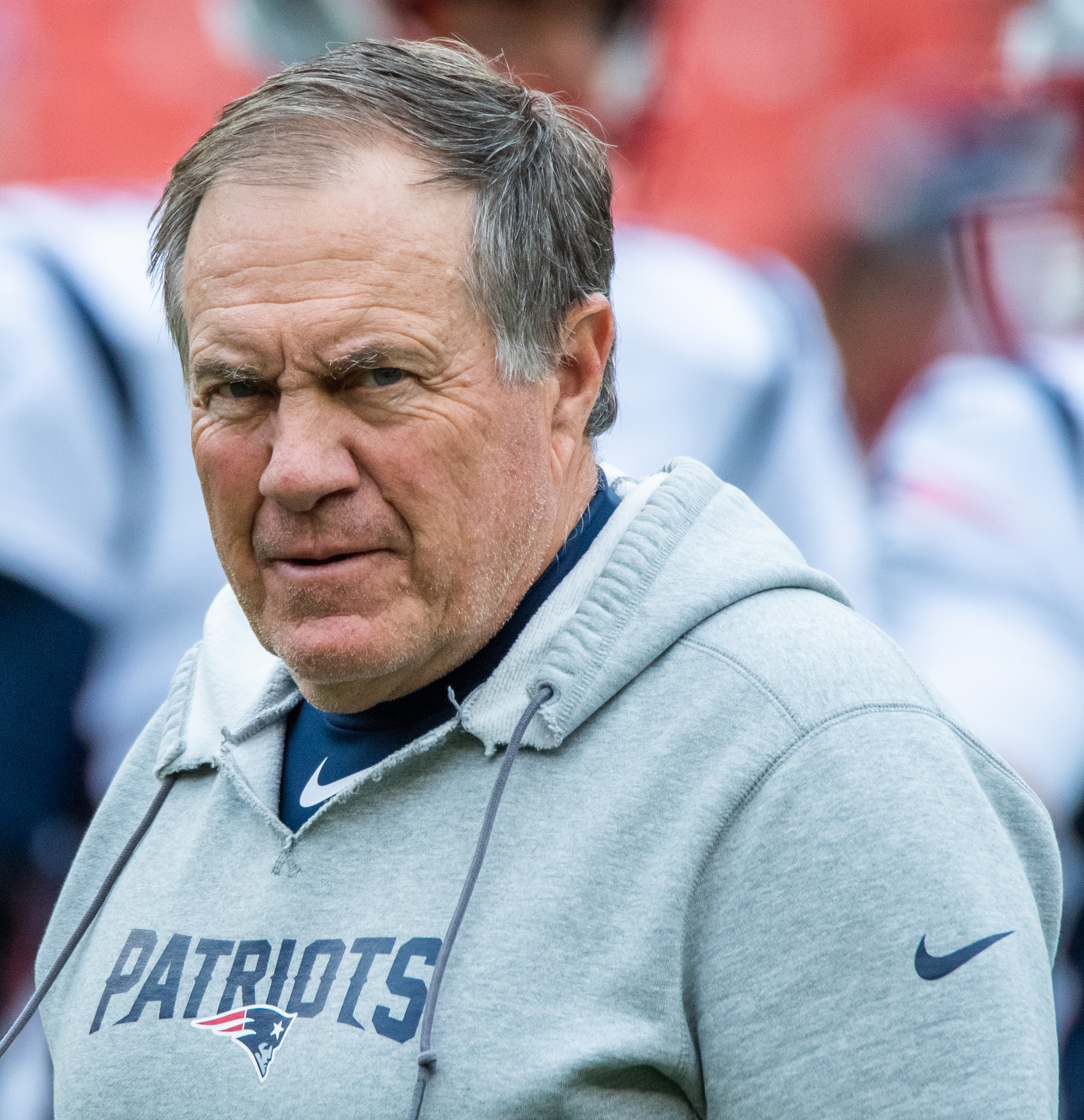
Bill Belichick was the most successful head coach in franchise history, leading the team to six Super Bowl championships in his 24-year tenure.

Twice in Patriots history there were "interim" head coaches. In 1972, John Mazur resigned with five games left in the season. Phil Bengtson was named as the interim head coach for the rest of the season, during which he only won one game, and he was not made the permanent coach the next year. In 1978, head coach Fairbanks secretly made a deal to leave the team to coach the University of Colorado Buffaloes while he was still coaching the Patriots. Team owner Billy Sullivan suspended Fairbanks for the final game of the regular season, stating "You cannot serve two masters," and Ron Erhardt and Hank Bullough took co-head coaching responsibilities for that game. Fairbanks was reinstated when the team qualified for the playoffs, and he lost the first playoff game, his last for the Patriots. Since Dick MacPherson, the Patriots have had only 5 coaches in 33 seasons.

== Key ==
#	Number of coaches
GC	Games coached
W	Wins
L	Losses
T	Ties
Win%	Winning percentage
†	Elected into the Pro Football Hall of Fame as a coach
‡	Elected into the Pro Football Hall of Fame as a player
*	Spent entire NFL head coaching career with the Patriots

== Coaches ==
Note: Statistics are accurate through the end of the 2025 NFL season.

#	Image	Name	Term (Note: Each year is linked to an article about that particular NFL season.)			Regular season					Playoffs			Accomplishments	Ref.
#	Image	Name	Yrs	First	Last	GC	W	L	T	Win%	GC	W	L	Accomplishments	Ref.
Boston Patriots
1		Lou Saban	2	1960	1961	19	7	12	0	.368	—				
2		Mike Holovak	8	1961	1968	107	52	46	9	.528	2	1	1	1 AFL playoff berth UPI AFL Coach of the Year (1966)	
3		Clive Rush*	2	1969	1970 (Note: Clive Rush resigned due to medical reasons after an 1–6 start in 1970. Offensive backfield coach John Mazur was promoted to interim head coach, where he went 1–6 to finish the year.)	21	5	16	0	.238	—				
4		John Mazur*	1	1970		7	1	6	0	.143	—				
New England Patriots
—		John Mazur*	2	1971	1972 (Note: The Patriots fired coach John Mazur after an 2–7 start in 1972. Former Packers head coach Phil Bengtson was brought in as interim head coach, where he went 1–4 to finish the year.)	23	8	15	0	.348	—				
5		Phil Bengtson	1	1972		5	1	4	0	.200	—				
6		Chuck Fairbanks*	6	1973	1978 (Note: Chuck Fairbanks was suspended for the last game of the 1978 regular season. He was reinstated for the playoffs, and lost in the first round.)	85	46	39	0	.541	2	0	2	1 AFC East Championship (1980); 2 Playoff berths UPI NFL Coach of the Year (1976); Sporting News NFL Coach of the Year (1976)	
7		Ron Erhardt	3	1979 (Note: Ron Erhardt's record includes one game where he shared head coaching duties with Hank Bullough during Chuck Fairbanks 1978 suspension. His first official year as head coach of the Patriots was 1979.)	1981	49	21	28	0	.428	—				
8		Ron Meyer	3	1982	1984 (Note: The Patriots fired coach Ron Meyer after an 5–3 start in 1984 amid issues between Meyer and the organization. Former wide receivers coach Raymond Berry was brought in as his replacement, where he went 4–4 to finish the year.)	33	18	15	0	.545	1	0	1	1 Playoff berth	
9		Raymond Berry*^{‡}	6	1984	1989	87	48	39	0	.551	5	3	2	1 AFC Championship (1985); 1 AFC East Championship (1985); 2 Playoff berths UPI NFL Coach of the Year (1985)	
10		Rod Rust*	1	1990		16	1	15	0	.062	—				
11		Dick MacPherson*	2	1991	1992	32	8	24	0	.250	—				
12		Bill Parcells ^{†}	4	1993	1996	64	32	32	0	.500	4	2	2	Inducted Pro Football Hall of Fame (2001); 1 AFC Championship (1996); 1 AFC East Championship (1996); 2 Playoff berths AP NFL Coach of the Year (1994); Pro Football Weekly NFL Coach of the Year (1994); Maxwell Football Club NFL Coach of the Year (1994); UPI NFL Coach of the Year (1994)	
13		Pete Carroll	3	1997	1999	48	27	21	0	.562	3	1	2	1 AFC East Championship (1997); 2 Playoff berths	
14		Bill Belichick	24	2000	2023	387	266	121	0	.687	42	30	12	6 Super Bowl championships (XXXVI, XXXVIII, XXXIX, XLIX, LI, LIII); 9 AFC championships (2001, 2003, 2004, 2007, 2011, 2014, 2016, 2017, 2018); 17 AFC East championships (2001, 2003, 2004, 2005, 2006, 2007, 2009, 2010, 2011, 2012, 2013, 2014, 2015, 2016, 2017, 2018, 2019); 18 Playoff Berths; AP NFL Coach of the Year (2003, 2007, 2010); Sporting News NFL Coach of the Year (2003); Pro Football Weekly NFL Coach of the Year (2003); Maxwell Football Club NFL Coach of the Year (2007); PFWA Executive of the Year (2021)	
15		Jerod Mayo*	1	2024		17	4	13	0	.235	—				
16		Mike Vrabel	1	2025	present	17	14	3	0	.824	4	3	1	1 AFC Championship (2025); 1 AFC East Championship (2025); 1 Playoff berth AP NFL Coach of the Year (2025)	
Totals			67	1960	2025	1,017	559	449	9	.554	63	40	23		
