= Jim White (defensive end) =

American football player (1948–1981)

No. 76, 78, 79, 87
- Positions: Defensive end, tight end

Personal information
- Born: September 5, 1948; Chicago, Illinois, U.S.
- Died: September 1981 (aged 32–33); Denver, Colorado, U.S.
- Listed height: 6 ft 4 in (1.93 m)
- Listed weight: 256 lb (116 kg)

Career information
- High school: Francis W. Parker (Chicago)
- College: Northeastern J. C. (1966–1967); Colorado State (1968–1970)
- NFL draft: 1972: 3rd round, 73rd overall pick

Career history
- BC Lions (1971); New England Patriots (1972–1973); Miami Dolphins (1973)*; Houston Oilers (1974–1975); Seattle Seahawks (1976); Denver Broncos (1976)
- * Offseason or practice squad member only

Career NFL statistics
- Games played: 48
- Games started: 7
- Sacks: 4.5
- Fumbles returned: 2
- Stats at Pro Football Reference

James Charles White (September 5, 1948 – September 1981) was an American professional football player who was a defensive end for the New England Patriots, Houston Oilers, Seattle Seahawks, and Denver Broncos of the National Football League (NFL), as well as the BC Lions of the Canadian Football League (CFL). He played college football for the Colorado State Rams.

== College career ==
After spending two years in community college at Northeastern Junior College, White attended Colorado State University, where he played for the Colorado State Rams football team and lettered from 1968 to 1970, playing tight end, fullback, and defensive end.

== Professional career ==
=== BC Lions ===
White signed with the BC Lions of the Canadian Football League in 1971. He was initially used as a tight end, making two receptions for 28 yards, but played defensive end for the majority of his time with the Lions until he was cut from the team on September 15, 1971, being replaced by former Michigan defensive lineman Pete Newell. In October 1971, the Lions brought White back to the team after a series of injuries to many players on the team, including defensive end Jim Duke.

On October 30, 1971, during the fourth quarter of the Lions' final game that season (a 31–7 victory over the Calgary Stampeders), White was ejected for fighting with Stampeders offensive lineman Lanny Boleski.

By the end of the 1971 season, White was considered one of the best defensive linemen in the CFL.

=== New England Patriots ===
White was selected in the third round of the 1972 NFL draft by the New England Patriots, with the 73rd pick overall. He was the second of two players drafted from Colorado State that year, with the first being Lawrence McCutcheon, drafted by the Los Angeles Rams only three picks before White. The Patriots considered that White may have had potential to be the best defensive rookie in the NFL, and possibly even the best defensive lineman in all of professional football. He officially signed a contract with the Patriots on May 6, 1972.

White saw action in the first six games of the season, but was not named a starter until the team's Week 7 game, an October 29 matchup against the New York Jets. In the 34–10 loss, White started at the left defensive end position, following coach John Mazur's decision to move Julius Adams from left end to tackle. White remained the starting left end for six straight games, all losses for the Patriots.

Over the course of the 1972 season, White played in thirteen games, only missing the team's final game: a Week 14 loss to the Denver Broncos, which came just after the firing of coach Mazur. White recorded one sack in 1972.

The Patriots waived White on September 6, 1973.

=== Miami Dolphins ===
On September 10, 1973, the Miami Dolphins signed White to a futures contract. He never played a game with the team.

=== Houston Oilers ===
White signed with the Houston Oilers in 1974. He played with the team for two seasons, playing in twelve games in 1974 and all fourteen games in 1975. He recorded 3.5 sacks and one fumble recovery with the Oilers.

The Oilers waived White on September 9, 1976.

=== Seattle Seahawks ===
Later on September 9, White was claimed off waivers by the Seattle Seahawks for their inaugural season. He played in the team's first two games, both losses against the St. Louis Cardinals and the Washington Redskins, before being released on September 27, 1976.

=== Denver Broncos ===
On October 21, 1976, White signed with the Denver Broncos, who had just moved cornerback Chris Pane to the injured reserve list to make room for White on the roster. As a Bronco, he played in seven games with one start, and recorded one fumble recovery. He also made ten tackles and blocked a field goal.

White was absent from the Broncos' four-day camp in May 1977, leading to the conclusion that he had been waived, though teams were not required to release waiver lists.

== Death ==
White died in September 1981 in Denver, Colorado. His death was caused by liver cancer, which had been attributed to his possible steroid use. This may make him the first NFL player to have died largely due to steroid use.
