= Reggie Rucker =

American football player (born 1947)

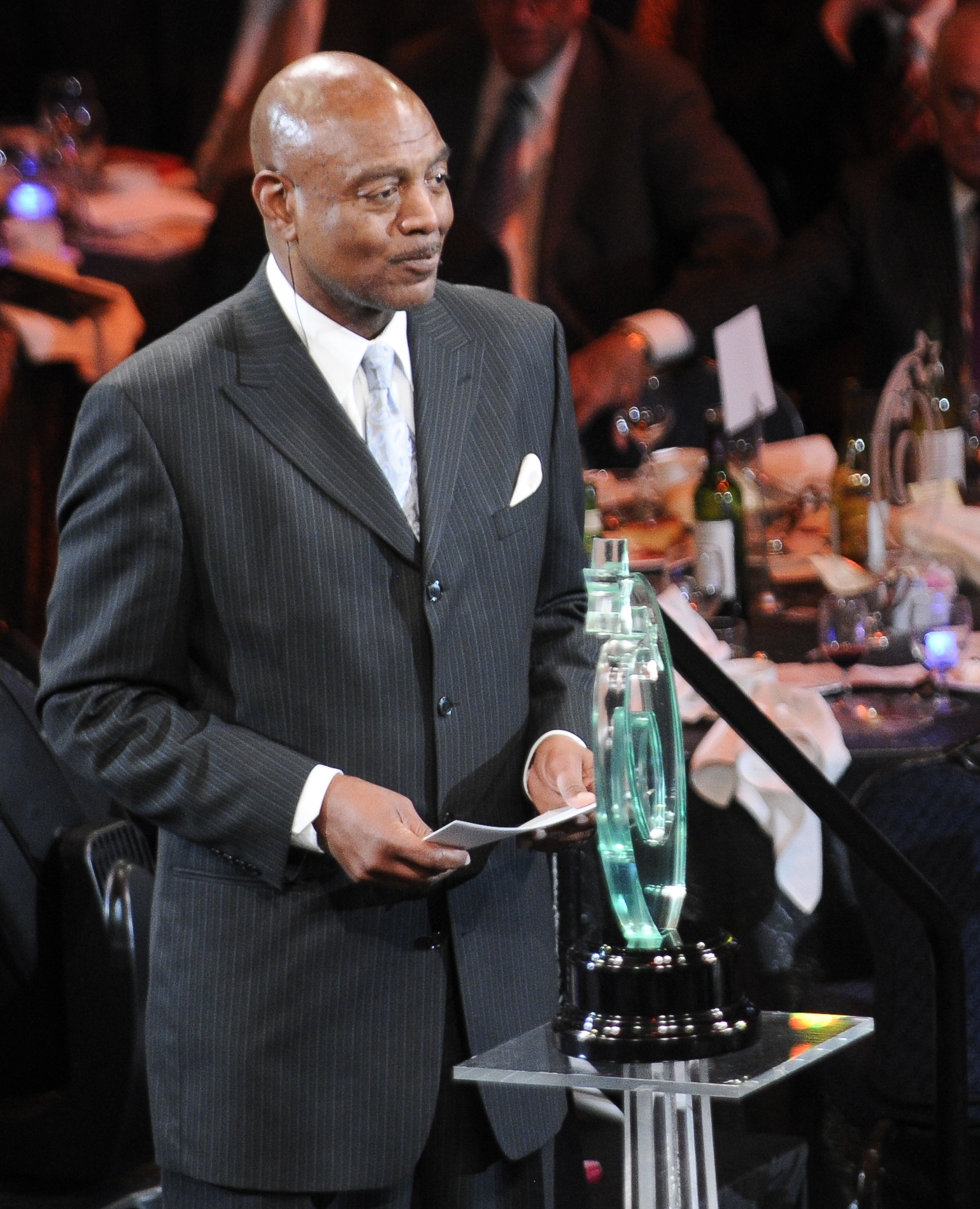
- Rucker at the 2011 Greater Cleveland Sports Awards

No. 88, 83, 33
- Position: Wide receiver

Personal information
- Born: September 21, 1947 (age 79); Washington, D.C., U.S.
- Listed height: 6 ft 2 in (1.88 m)
- Listed weight: 195 lb (88 kg)

Career information
- High school: Anacostia (Washington D.C.)
- College: Boston University (1965–1968)
- NFL draft: 1969: undrafted

Career history
- Dallas Cowboys (1969–1971); New York Giants (1971); New England Patriots (1971–1974); Cleveland Browns (1975–1981)

Awards and highlights
- Super Bowl champion (VI)

Career NFL statistics
- Receptions: 447
- Receiving yards: 7,065
- Receiving touchdowns: 44
- Stats at Pro Football Reference

Reginald Joseph Rucker (born September 21, 1947) is an American former professional football player who was a wide receiver in the National Football League (NFL) for the Dallas Cowboys, New York Giants, New England Patriots and Cleveland Browns. He played college football for the Boston University Terriers.

== Early life ==
Rucker attended Anacostia High School before moving on to Boston University. He was a four sport athlete (football, baseball, track and basketball), making him the school's first four sport athlete in more than 20 years.

In football, he contributed to an undefeated season by the freshman team. As a sophomore, his first play in a varsity game was a 71-yard punt return for a touchdown against the University of Massachusetts Amherst. He went on to break a New England major college record with three punts returned for touchdowns in a season.

In his final year, his team included Bruce Taylor, Pat Hughes, Fred Barry and Barry Pryor, who would go on to play in the NFL.

In 1978, he was inducted into the Boston University Athletic Hall of Fame.

== Professional career ==
=== Dallas Cowboys ===
Rucker was signed as an undrafted free agent by the Dallas Cowboys after the 1969 NFL/AFL draft. As a rookie, he spent the season in the taxi squad until being activated for the Playoff Bowl against the Los Angeles Rams.

The next year, he broke his left wrist during preseason, which forced the team to place him again in the taxi squad. He eventually was promoted to the active roster and became a starter in place of the troubled Lance Rentzel for the last two games of the regular season (ahead of former first round draft choice Dennis Homan), including the Cowboys' playoff drive and its narrow Super Bowl V loss to the Baltimore Colts.

In 1971, the Cowboys traded Rentzel and in a separate deal obtained future hall of famer Lance Alworth as part of the "Bambi trade" in May. The move would eventually force the team to waive Rucker on October 2, opting to keep wide receiver Gloster Richardson instead.

=== New York Giants ===
Rucker was claimed off waivers by the New York Giants On October 3, 1971. He was released on November 1.

=== New England Patriots ===
On November 3, 1971, he was claimed off waivers by the New England Patriots. The next year, he became a starter and finished with 44 receptions for 681 yards.

In 1973, he had a breakout performance with 53 reception (sixth in the league) for 743 yards (eighth in the league).

After breaking his right wrist in the fourth game of the 1974 season against the Baltimore Colts, he played the next six games with a cast until being placed on the injured reserve list on November 18, 1974.

It was reported that a disagreement between head coach Chuck Fairbanks and Rucker about being placed on injured reserve, was the reason that led the Patriots to trade him to the Cleveland Browns on January 28, 1975, in exchange for a fourth-round draft choice (#86-Allen Carter).

=== Cleveland Browns ===
In 1975, he finished with 60 receptions, ranking second (first among wide receivers) in the NFL, even though he played with cartilage damage in his knee (suffered in training camp), that required offseason surgery the following year.

In the 1976 opening game against the New York Jets, he recorded three receiving touchdowns, becoming only the fourth player in franchise history to achieve this feat.

In 1978, he was one of the people that recommended the hiring of new head coach Sam Rutigliano to team owner Art Modell. That season, he finished sixth in the NFL with 893 receiving yards and fourth with 20.8 yards per catch.

Rucker became part of the "Kardiac Kids" teams, which won numerous games in dramatic fashion, during the 1979 and 1980 seasons.

At the end of the 1981 season, knee injuries made him lose his starting job to Ricky Feacher. On September 2, 1982, he announced his retirement rather than accept a backup role. He registered 310 receptions (at the time third most in franchise history) in 103 games (seven seasons) with the Browns, for 4,953 yards (16 yards avg.) and 32 touchdowns.

== NFL career statistics ==
Legend
	Won the Super Bowl
**Bold**	Career high

=== Regular season ===
Year	Team	Games		Receiving				
Year	Team	GP	GS	Rec	Yds	Avg	Lng	TD
1970	DAL	7	2	9	200	**22.2**	52	1
1971	DAL	2	0	1	19	19.0	19	1
1971	NYG	4	0	1	9	9.0	9	0
1971	NWE	5	0	2	24	12.0	19	0
1972	NWE	14	14	44	681	15.5	62	3
1973	NWE	14	14	53	743	14.0	64	3
1974	NWE	10	10	27	436	16.1	**69**	4
1975	CLE	14	14	**60**	770	12.8	40	3
1976	CLE	14	14	49	676	13.8	45	**8**
1977	CLE	14	14	36	565	15.7	40	2
1978	CLE	15	15	43	**893**	20.8	**69**	**8**
1979	CLE	16	16	43	749	17.4	54	6
1980	CLE	16	16	52	768	14.8	45	4
1981	CLE	14	11	27	532	19.7	49	1
		159	140	447	7,065	15.8	69	44

=== Playoffs ===
Year	Team	Games		Receiving				
Year	Team	GP	GS	Rec	Yds	Avg	Lng	TD
1970	DAL	3	3	1	21	**21.0**	**21**	0
1980	CLE	1	1	**2**	**38**	19.0	20	0
		4	4	3	59	19.7	21	0

== Post-playing career ==
Rucker has been a part of the Cleveland media since his retirement. He was a color analyst for the Cleveland Indians baseball team from 1982 to 1984. He also served as an analyst for NBC's NFL coverage from 1983 to 1988.

He hosted a nightly sports talk show on WKNR AM 1220 in the early 1990s. After a hiatus, Rucker returned to the Cleveland airwaves as a football analyst for WEWS Channel 5 covering the Browns and the Ohio State Buckeyes since 2004.

Rucker's son, Derek, played professional basketball in Australia, England and the Philippines.

=== Controversies ===
Rucker attracted ridicule when he claimed during a 1984 NBC broadcast (Cleveland vs Cincinnati) that he had dinner the night before with Bengals coach Sam Wyche and had done an interview with the coach; Wyche later stated he did not have dinner with Rucker while also calling him a "blatant liar." Rucker later admitted he had made up the dinner and interview. This incident tarnished his reputation, and Rucker gradually slid down the broadcasting hierarchy, until he was relegated to only the least important games each week. With no hope of recovering his once burgeoning post-playing career, he left NBC in 1988.

In August 2016, Rucker was sentenced to 21 months in prison for embezzling money from the Cleveland Peacemakers Alliance and other nonprofits. He was released in May 2018, and filed for Chapter 7 bankruptcy in November 2018.
