= Steve Booras =

American gridiron football player (1948–2023)

Profile
- Position: Defensive end

Personal information
- Born: April 29, 1948; Sheridan, Wyoming, U.S.
- Died: March 25, 2023 (aged 74); Billings, Montana, U.S.
- Listed height: 6 ft 5 in (1.96 m)
- Listed weight: 245 lb (111 kg)

Career information
- High school: Sheridan (WY); Billings (MT)
- College: Mesa (CO)
- NFL draft: 1971: 12th round, 298th overall pick

Career history
- 1969: Las Vegas Cowboys
- 1970–1971: Montreal Alouettes
- 1974: Memphis Southmen
- 1976: Montreal Alouettes

Awards and highlights
- Grey Cup champion (1970)

Stephen George Booras (April 29, 1948 – March 25, 2023) was an American professional football player who played for the Montreal Alouettes and Memphis Southmen. He won the Grey Cup with them in 1970. He previously played football at Mesa College—now known as Colorado Mesa University.

He died on March 25, 2023, at the age of 74 from natural causes.
