= Bruce Barnes (American football) =

American football player (born 1951)

No. 3
- Position: Punter

Personal information
- Born: June 21, 1951 (age 75); Coshocton, Ohio, U.S.
- Listed height: 5 ft 11 in (1.80 m)
- Listed weight: 215 lb (98 kg)

Career information
- High school: Sanger Union (Sanger, California)
- College: UCLA
- NFL draft: 1973: 12th round, 290th overall pick

Career history
- New England Patriots (1973–1974)

Awards and highlights
- First-team All-Pac-8 (1972)

Career NFL statistics
- Punts: 100
- Punting yards: 3,738
- Stats at Pro Football Reference

Bruce Barnes (born June 21, 1951) is a former punter in the National Football League (NFL).

== College career ==
Barnes was the primary punter for UCLA Bruins for three seasons. He led the Pacific-8 in punting all three years and was named All-Pacific-8 as a senior.

== Professional career ==
Barnes was selected in the 12th round (290th overall) of the 1973 NFL draft by the New England Patriots. As a rookie, Barnes punted 55 times for 2,134 yards (38.8 average). Barnes served as the Patriots' punter for the first nine games of the 1974 season before he was waived in November.

== Personal life ==
Barnes is the father of professional golfer Ricky Barnes.
