= Perry Pruett =

American football player (born 1949)

No. 38
- Position: Defensive back

Personal information
- Born: March 7, 1949 (age 77); Dallas, Texas, U.S.
- Listed height: 6 ft 0 in (1.83 m)
- Listed weight: 185 lb (84 kg)

Career information
- High school: Grand Prairie (TX) Dalworth
- College: North Texas
- NFL draft: 1971: undrafted

Career history
- New England Patriots (1971)
- Stats at Pro Football Reference

Perry Pruett (born March 7, 1949) is an American former professional football player who was a defensive back for the New England Patriots of the National Football League (NFL) in 1971. He played college football for the North Texas Mean Green.
