= Bob Geddes =

American football player (born 1946)

No. 57, 59
- Position: Linebacker

Personal information
- Born: April 22, 1946 (age 80); Seattle, Washington, U.S.
- Listed height: 6 ft 2 in (1.88 m)
- Listed weight: 240 lb (109 kg)

Career information
- High school: Polytechnic (Riverside, California)
- College: UCLA
- NFL draft: 1970: 14th round, 360th overall pick

Career history
- Los Angeles Rams (1970)*; Denver Broncos (1971–1972); New England Patriots (1973–1975)
- * Offseason or practice squad member only
- Stats at Pro Football Reference

Robert Eric Geddes (born April 22, 1946) is an American former professional football linebacker who played in the National Football League (NFL) with the Denver Broncos and New England Patriots. He played college football for the UCLA Bruins and was selected by the Los Angeles Rams in the 14th round of the 1970 NFL draft.

== Early life ==
Robert Eric Geddes was born on April 22, 1946, in Seattle, Washington. He attended Riverside Polytechnic High School in Riverside, California.

== College career ==
Geddes served in the United States Marine Corps after high school. He then enrolled at Riverside City College, where he was a three-year letterman in track and set multiple league records in the pole vault. In 1967, Geddes played for Riverside's college football team as a defensive end.

In 1969, Geddes was offered an athletic scholarship to attend the University of California, Los Angeles and play football for the Bruins. He was a two-year letterman for the Bruins from 1968 to 1969, earning honorable mention All-American honors during the latter season.

== Professional career ==
Geddes was selected by the Los Angeles Rams in the 14th round, with the 360th overall pick, of the 1970 NFL draft. He was cut on August 16, 1970 but immediately signed to the team's taxi squad, where he spent the entire 1970 season.

On March 10, 1971, Geddes signed with the Denver Broncos. On August 31, 1971, he was waived/injured and reverted to injured reserve. He played in all 14 games, starting three, for the Broncos in 1972 as a linebacker and posted one sack. Geddes was cut by Denver on August 7, 1973.

On November 21, 1973, the New England Patriots signed Geddes to replace injured linebacker Will Foster. Geddes played in 24 games, starting six, for the Patriots from 1973 to 1975, recording two interceptions for 32 yards and one touchdown. On July 21, 1976, it was reported that Geddes had informed the Patriots he would be retiring for personal reasons.

== Personal life ==
After his football career, Geddes became an investor in numerous industries. He was considered a "mogul" in the concert industry. He helped create Irvine Meadows Amphitheatre. Geddes was inducted into Riverside City College's athletics hall of fame in 2016.
