= Ken Pope =

American football player (born 1951)

No. 41
- Position: Cornerback

Personal information
- Born: December 28, 1951 (age 74); Galveston, Texas, U.S.
- Listed height: 5 ft 11 in (1.80 m)
- Listed weight: 200 lb (91 kg)

Career information
- High school: Ball
- College: Oklahoma
- NFL draft: 1974: 9th round, 227th overall pick

Career history
- New England Patriots (1974)
- Stats at Pro Football Reference

Kenith Von Pope (born December 28, 1951) is an American former professional football player who was a cornerback for the New England Patriots of the National Football League (NFL). He played college football for the University of Oklahoma
