= Burnie Miller =

American football coach

Biographical details
- Born: April 1, 1928; Portsmouth, Virginia, U.S.
- Died: April 1988 (aged 60); Virginia Beach, Virginia, U.S.
- Education: Wofford College

Playing career
- 1950: Wofford
- Position: Fullback

Coaching career (HC unless noted)
- 1970: San Francisco 49ers (DB)
- 1971: Houston Oilers (DB)
- 1972: New England Patriots (ST)
- 1973: Houston Oilers (DC/DB)
- 1977: Detroit Lions (DB)
- 1981–1985: San Diego State (assistant)

George Burnley "Burnie" Miller Jr. (April 1, 1928 – April 1988) was an American football coach who specialized in tutoring defensive backs. He was a paratrooper and began his football coaching career with the 82nd Airborne Division. He was an assistant coach at the University of Wyoming and Indiana University under Phil Dickens, then joined Clay Stapleton's staff at Iowa State University as an assistant coach in 1958, then served as an assistant coach at Purdue University under Jack Mollenkopf. He coached in the NFL for the San Francisco 49ers, Houston Oilers, New England Patriots, and Detroit Lions. He was defensive coordinator for the Oilers in 1973.
