= Hubie Bryant =

American football player (born 1946)

No. 32, 45, 84
- Position: Wide receiver

Personal information
- Born: February 10, 1946 (age 80); Pittsburgh, Pennsylvania, U.S.
- Listed height: 5 ft 10 in (1.78 m)
- Listed weight: 170 lb (77 kg)

Career information
- High school: Penn Hills (Pittsburgh)
- College: Minnesota
- NFL draft: 1968: undrafted

Career history
- Cleveland Browns (1968)*; Pittsburgh Steelers (1970); New England Patriots (1971–1972)
- * Offseason or practice squad member only

Career NFL statistics
- Receptions: 22
- Receiving yards: 366
- Touchdowns: 1
- Return yards: 435
- Stats at Pro Football Reference

Hubert Lavann Bryant (born February 10, 1946) is an American former professional football player who was a wide receiver for three seasons for the Pittsburgh Steelers in 1970 and the New England Patriots from 1971 to 1972. He played college football at the University of Minnesota for the Minnesota Golden Gophers..

Bryant also sprinted for the Golden Gophers track and field team, anchoring their All-American 4 × 100 m relay team at the 1968 NCAA University Division outdoor track and field championships.
