= Clarence Scott (defensive back) =

American football player (1944–2019)

- Scott, 1970

Profile
- Positions: Safety, cornerback

Personal information
- Born: May 5, 1944; Norristown, Pennsylvania, U.S.
- Died: May 17, 2019 (aged 75)
- Listed height: 6 ft 1 in (1.85 m)
- Listed weight: 186 lb (84 kg)

Career information
- High school: Upper Merion (PA)
- College: Morgan State

Career history
- Houston Oilers (1966)*; Philadelphia Bulldogs (1966); Boston Patriots (1969–1970); New England Patriots (1971–1972)
- * Offseason or practice squad member only

Career NFL statistics
- Games played: 43
- Games started: 24
- Stats at Pro Football Reference

Clarence Scott (May 5, 1944 – May 17, 2019) was an American football player. He played college football for Morgan State as a running back and linebacker from 1962 to 1965. He played professional football as a safety and cornerback for the Boston/New England Patriots from 1969 to 1972.

== Early life ==
Scott was born in Norristown, Pennsylvania, in 1944. He attended Upper Merion High School in King of Prussia, Pennsylvania, and played college football at Morgan State from 1962 to 1965. Scott played at running back and linebacker for Morgan State.

== Professional football ==
Scott signed with the Houston Oilers as a free agent in January 1966, but he was cut before the regular season began. He played in the Continental Football League for the Philadelphia Bulldogs in 1966.

Scott was drafted into the U.S. Army after the 1966 season. When he was discharged from the Army, he returned to the Oilers and was cut again. He returned home to Pennsylvania and worked in his father's catering business.

Scott's football career was revived in 1969 when he joined the Boston Patriots. He played for the Boston/New England Patriots for four years from 1969 to 1972. He appeared in 43 games, 24 as a starter.

== Later life ==
Scott died in 2019 at age 75.
