= Larry Carwell =

American football player (1944–1984)

No. 41
- Position: Cornerback

Personal information
- Born: August 5, 1944; Vada, Georgia, U.S.
- Died: January 9, 1984 (aged 39)
- Listed height: 6 ft 1 in (1.85 m)
- Listed weight: 188 lb (85 kg)

Career information
- High school: Memorial (Campbell, Ohio)
- College: Iowa State
- NFL draft: 1967: 3rd round, 56th overall pick

Career history
- Houston Oilers (1967-1968); Boston/New England Patriots (1969-1972)

Awards and highlights
- Second-team All-Big Eight (1966)

Career NFL/AFL statistics
- Interceptions: 14
- Fumble recoveries: 4
- Touchdowns: 3
- Stats at Pro Football Reference

Larry Carwell (August 5, 1944 – January 10, 1984) was an American college and professional football player. A cornerback, he played college football at Iowa State University, and played professionally in the American Football League (AFL) for the Houston Oilers in 1967 and 1968 and the Boston Patriots in 1969. He continued to play for the NFL Boston Patriots and later the NFL New England Patriots from 1970 through 1972. He played for the Buffalo Bills in 1973.

In 1984, he was a United States Drug Enforcement Administration officer working to stop the flow of marijuana and cocaine into the United States from Latin America. While aboard a U.S. helicopter bound for the Bahamas, he was one of five missing persons lost at sea when the helicopter crashed.

== See also ==
- List of American Football League players
