= Donnell Smith =

American football player (born 1949)

No. 74, 65
- Position: Defensive end

Personal information
- Born: May 25, 1949 (age 77); Lakeland, Florida, U.S.
- Listed height: 6 ft 4 in (1.93 m)
- Listed weight: 245 lb (111 kg)

Career information
- High school: Kathleen (FL)
- College: Southern
- NFL draft: 1971: 5th round, 116th overall pick

Career history
- Green Bay Packers (1971); New England Patriots (1973–1974); Southern California Sun (1975)

Career NFL statistics
- Sacks: 4
- Fumble recoveries: 1
- Stats at Pro Football Reference

Donnell Smith (born May 25, 1949) is former defensive end in the National Football League (NFL). He was selected by the Green Bay Packers in the fifth round of the 1971 NFL draft and played with the team that season. After a season away from the NFL, he played two seasons with the New England Patriots.
