= Will Foster (American football) =

American football player (born 1948)

No. 55
- Position: Linebacker

Personal information
- Born: October 2, 1948 (age 78); Grady, Alabama, U.S.

Career information
- College: Eastern Michigan
- NFL draft: 1972: 7th round, 170th overall pick

Career history
- Philadelphia Eagles (1972)*; New England Patriots (1973–1974)
- * Offseason or practice squad member only

Career NFL statistics
- Touchdowns: 1
- Fumble recoveries: 2
- Stats at Pro Football Reference

William Henry Foster (born October 2, 1948) is an American former professional football player who was a linebacker for the New England Patriots of the National Football League (NFL). He played college football for the Eastern Michigan Eagles.

== College career ==
Foster attended Eastern Michigan University, where he played for the Eagles. In 1970, he was named to the National Association of Intercollegiate Athletics District 23 All-Star football team as a defensive end.

== Professional career ==
=== 1972 ===
Foster was selected by the Philadelphia Eagles in the seventh round of the 1972 NFL draft with the 170th overall selection. He competed in training camp with three others – fellow rookie Bill Overmyer and veterans Ike Kelley and Bill Cody – to replace Tim Rossovich, who was holding out and was eventually traded, to be the Eagles' middle linebacker after Steve Zabel was injured in training camp. He was cut by the Eagles shortly before the 1972 regular season began.

=== 1973 ===
The Patriots signed Foster in May 1973. After an exhibition game in August, Patriots coach Chuck Fairbanks said of Foster and fellow young linebackers Steve King and Brad Dusek that "they did some things well and some poor. But I have to give them a chance." Foster was placed on the Patriots' taxi squad before the season begain. But after he was activated and played in the 2nd game of the season against the Kansas City Chiefs, Boston Globe writer Leigh Montville said that "he looks like a discovery" with 11 tackles, 7 assists and 1 quarterback sack in the game. Fairbanks said of him after the game "He made some good tackles out there. But he missed a couple of assignment plays you wouldn't notice, unless you're the coach. He played real hard, he's young and he has a lot to learn. He is one of the most natural linebackers we have." Foster said of his performance:

I felt good out there. I used to get nervous and everything, but today I felt good. I felt I might play a little because [ starting linebacker Edgar] Chandler's ankle has been bothering him, but I didn't think I'd play this much.

In a game against the New York Jets a few weeks later, Foster scored the only touchdown of his career on a fumble recovery after a blocked punt. Foster then injured his knee in a game against the Green Bay Packers on November 18 and required surgery and had to miss the remainder of the season.

=== 1974 ===
In 1974 Foster was supposed to compete with Chandler for a starting linebacker job with the Patriots, but 15th round draft pick Sam Hunt beat both of them out and Foster became a backup and special teams player. After the Patriots won their 3rd straight game to open the season against the Los Angeles Rams, in which many sportswriters including Boston Globe writer Leigh Montville picked the Rams to win, Foster burned a newspaper with Montville's picks in the Patriots' locker room saying "Get out of here all you guys who picked the Rams. The Rams, the Rams, the Rams. We're sick of hearing about the Rams.We want to hear about the Patriots. In late October, Foster was unhappy enough to walk out on the Patriots and he missed their October 27 game against the Minnesota Vikings. He returned to the team a few days later, with Fairbanks saying:

I didn't ask him why he left. I only asked him if he wanted to play football. He said he did. Right now I'm interested in the future, not the past. The injury to [Bob] Windsor leaves a spot open on our roster so we could put Foster on if we want to.

Foster also missed the Patriots' November 10 game against the Cleveland Browns with the flu, but played in all the rest of the Patriots' games in 1974. The Patriots waived him after the season.
