= Larrye Weaver =

American football player and coach (born 1931)

Profile
- Position: Halfback

Personal information
- Born: November 17, 1931 (age 94); Monte Vista, Colorado, U.S.
- Listed height: 5 ft 11 in (1.80 m)
- Listed weight: 190 lb (86 kg)

Career information
- High school: Anaheim (CA)
- College: Antelope Valley, Fullerton

Career history

Playing
- New York Giants (1955)

Coaching
- North Dakota State (1964–1966) Defensive assistant; Arizona (1967–1968) Defensive assistant; UCLA (1969–1970) Defensive assistant; Los Angeles Rams (1971–1972) Defensive backs coach; New England Patriots (1973–1976) Defensive backs coach; San Diego Chargers (1977–1980) Defensive backs coach; San Diego Chargers (1981–1982) Offensive coordinator; Cleveland Browns (1983) Offensive coordinator; Ottawa Rough Riders (1987–1988) Defensive backs coach

Career NFL statistics
- Carries: 3
- Rushing yards: 0
- Stats at Pro Football Reference
- Coaching profile at Pro Football Reference

Lawrence Bernard "Larrye" Weaver (born November 17, 1931) is an American former professional football player and coach in the National Football League (NFL). He played for the New York Giants as a halfback and defensive back in 1955. He attended Antelope Valley College and Fullerton College. After his playing career, he became an assistant coach in college and professional football, most prominently as the offensive coordinator for the San Diego Chargers and the Cleveland Browns in the early 1980s.

== Early life and amateur career ==
Weaver was born in 1931 in Monte Vista, Colorado. He moved to Anaheim, California as a child and attended Anaheim High School and Antelope Valley Junior College. He also served in the United States Air Force. He played college football at the halfback position for Antelope Valley and received the nickname "The Anaheim Antelope".

== Professional career ==
Weaver signed with the New York Giants of the National Football League in 1955, replacing Buford Long, who had been drafted into the army. Weaver appeared in six games for the Giants, playing halfback and defensive back, and carried the ball three times for zero net yards.

== Coaching career ==
Weaver began his coaching career in 1964 as a defensive assistant for North Dakota State. In 1967, he moved to the University of Arizona, and after two seasons there left to coach for UCLA.

In 1971, Weaver jumped to the NFL, serving as the defensive backs coach for the Los Angeles Rams. After two years, he took up the same position with the New England Patriots, where he coached from 1973 to 1976. In 1977, Weaver was hired by the San Diego Chargers, and served as their defensive backs coach from 1977 through 1980. In 1981, he became the Chargers' offensive coordinator under head coach Don Coryell, replacing Joe Gibbs after he was hired as coach of the Washington Redskins. In Weaver's first game as the offensive play caller, he guided the Chargers to 535 yards and 44 points in a victory over the Cleveland Browns. By the end of 1981, the Chargers' offense had set NFL records in net yards and passing yards. San Diego also led the league in those categories the following year.

In 1983, Weaver became the offensive coordinator of the Cleveland Browns. He introduced the one-back offense, which he had utilized in San Diego, to Cleveland. In Week 4 of the season, Weaver used his knowledge of San Diego's offense and defense to help the Browns beat the Chargers in overtime by a score of 30–24, for which he received a game ball. The victory gave Cleveland a 3–1 record. The Browns finished the season at 9–7, barely missing the playoffs. Prior to the 1984 season, Weaver resigned as Cleveland's offensive coordinator for personal reasons.

In 1987, Weaver was hired by Fred Glick to be the defensive backfield coach for the Ottawa Rough Riders of the Canadian Football League. After the team went 3–15 that year and 2–16 the next, Weaver was fired along with the rest of the coaching staff after the end of the 1988 season.
