= Arthur Moore (American football) =

American football player (born 1951)

No. 75
- Position: Defensive lineman

Personal information
- Born: April 4, 1951 (age 75); Daingerfield, Texas, U.S.
- Listed height: 6 ft 5 in (1.96 m)
- Listed weight: 253 lb (115 kg)

Career information
- High school: Daingerfield
- College: Tulsa
- NFL draft: 1973: 6th round, 149th overall pick

Career history
- San Francisco 49ers (1973)*; New England Patriots (1973–1977); Cleveland Browns (1977)*
- * Offseason or practice squad member only
- Stats at Pro Football Reference

Arthur Clark Moore (born April 4, 1951) is an American former professional football defensive lineman who played for the New England Patriots of the National Football League (NFL). He played college football for the Tulsa Golden Hurricane and was selected by the San Francisco 49ers in the sixth round of the 1973 NFL draft.

== Early life ==
Arthur Clark Moore was born on April 4, 1951, in Daingerfield, Texas. He played high school football at Daingerfield High School, earning first-team All-District 14-AA honors as a senior in 1968.

== College career ==
In May 1969, Moore accepted an athletic scholarship to attend the University of Tulsa and play college football for the Golden Hurricane. He played for the freshman team in 1969 and the varsity team from 1970 to 1972.

== Professional career ==
Moore was selected by the San Francisco 49ers in the sixth round, with the 149th overall pick, of the 1973 NFL draft. He was waived on September 10 before the start of the 1973 regular season.

Moore was claimed off waivers by the New England Patriots on September 11. He played in 24 games for the Patriots from 1973 to 1974 as a reserve defensive lineman, recording six sacks and one fumble recovery. He suffered a severe knee injury late in the 1974 season. Moore missed the entire 1975 season due to the same knee injury. He only practiced ten times during 1976 training camp and the preseason due to pneomonia and a viral infection. On August 26, 1976, he was placed on the pre-season inactive list due to his knee injury from 1974 still bothering him. Moore later appeared in four games during the 1976 season and one game in 1977.

On October 5, 1977, Moore was traded to the Cleveland Browns for an undisclosed draft pick, conditional based on Moore playing for the Browns. He was released on October 7 before ever playing for the Browns, so they did not have to send New England a draft pick.
