= Sam Adams Sr. =

American football player (1948–2015)

No. 61
- Position: Offensive guard

Personal information
- Born: September 20, 1948; Jasper, Texas, U.S.
- Died: October 10, 2015 (aged 67); Houston, Texas, U.S.
- Listed height: 6 ft 3 in (1.91 m)
- Listed weight: 256 lb (116 kg)

Career information
- High school: Jasper
- College: Prairie View A&M
- NFL draft: 1970: undrafted

Career history
- Los Angeles Rams (1970)*; Dallas Cowboys (1971)*; New England Patriots (1971–1980); New Orleans Saints (1981)
- * Offseason or practice squad member only

Career NFL statistics
- Games played: 135
- Stats at Pro Football Reference

Samuel Edward Adams Sr. (September 20, 1948 – October 10, 2015) was an American professional football player who was an offensive guard with the New England Patriots (1972–1980) and the New Orleans Saints (1981) of the National Football League (NFL). He played college football for the Prairie View A&M Panthers. He was a member of the New England Patriots 1970s All-Decade Team and 35th Anniversary Team.

Adams was a member of the Patriots' taxi squad during the 1971 season before landing a place on the roster in 1972.

Adams died at Methodist Willowbrook Hospital in Houston Texas on October 10, 2015, at the age of 67. He was the father of defensive tackle, Sam Adams. He is the uncle of safety Andrew Adams.
