= John Tanner (gridiron football, born 1945) =

American gridiron football player (1945–2009)

No. 85, 53
- Positions: Linebacker, defensive end, tight end

Personal information
- Born: March 8, 1945; Orlando, Florida, U.S.
- Died: February 5, 2009 (aged 63); Merritt Island, Florida, U.S.
- Listed height: 6 ft 4 in (1.93 m)
- Listed weight: 241 lb (109 kg)

Career information
- High school: Cocoa (Cocoa, Florida)
- College: Tennessee Tech
- NFL draft: 1971: 9th round, 221st overall pick

Career history
- San Diego Chargers (1971); Toronto Argonauts (1972); New England Patriots (1973–1975); Montreal Alouettes (1976)

Career NFL statistics
- Receptions: 3
- Receiving yards: 29
- Receiving touchdowns: 1
- Stats at Pro Football Reference

John Vance Tanner (March 8, 1945 – February 5, 2009) was an American gridiron football linebacker, defensive end and tight end who played in the National Football League (NFL) and the Canadian Football League (CFL). He played college football and basketball at Tennessee Tech.

== Early life and military service ==
Tanner was born in Orlando, Florida and grew up in Cocoa, Florida. He attended Cocoa High School, where he was a member of the basketball team, but did not graduate because was expelled two weeks before graduation in 1963 after an altercation with a teacher. Tanner enlisted in the US Army and was deployed to Vietnam.

== College career ==
After being discharged from the Army, Tanner enrolled at Brevard Junior College, where he played basketball. After finishing his two years at Brevard he moved on to play basketball at Tennessee Tech University. As a senior he also joined the football team, despite not having played the sport in high school, and became a two-way starter at defensive end and tight end and was named the Golden Eagles' most valuable player.

== Professional career ==
Tanner was selected with the 221st overall pick in the ninth round of the 1971 NFL draft by the San Diego Chargers. He played both tight end and defensive end as a rookie, playing in all 14 of the Chargers' games with three starts and catching one pass for six yards. Tanner was signed by the Toronto Argonauts of the Canadian Football League (CFL) in 1972. He was signed by the New England Patriots in 1973. Tanner started at outside linebacker for the first two games of the 1974 season, but lost his starting spot to George Webster after missing a game due to a shoulder injury. He occasionally played tight end and caught two passes for 23 yards, including a two-yard touchdown reception against the Baltimore Colts on November 24. Tanner was the first primarily defensive player to score a touchdown on offense in Patriots history and the only player to do so until Mike Vrabel did so in 2002. He was cut by the Patriots during training camp in 1975. Tanner returned to the CFL with the Montreal Alouettes in 1976.

== Post-football life ==
After retiring from football, Tanner worked for USBI Co. Tanner died of cancer on February 5, 2009.
