= Kenny Price (American football) =

American football player (born 1950)

No. 54
- Position: Linebacker

Personal information
- Born: April 7, 1950 (age 76); Houston, Texas, U.S.
- Listed height: 6 ft 2 in (1.88 m)
- Listed weight: 225 lb (102 kg)

Career information
- High school: Kashmere
- College: Iowa
- NFL draft: 1971: undrafted

Career history
- New England Patriots (1971)
- Stats at Pro Football Reference

Kenneth James Price (born April 7, 1950) is an American former professional football player who was a linebacker for the New England Patriots of the National Football League (NFL). He played college football for the Iowa Hawkeyes.
