= Willie Banks (American football) =

American football player (1946–1989)

No. 68, 60, 78
- Position: Guard

Personal information
- Born: March 17, 1946; Greenville, Mississippi, U.S.
- Died: July 2, 1989 (aged 43); Washington, D.C., U.S.
- Listed height: 6 ft 2 in (1.88 m)
- Listed weight: 250 lb (113 kg)

Career information
- High school: N.C. O'Bannon (Greenville)
- College: Alcorn State (1964-1967)
- NFL draft: 1968: 6th round, 149th overall pick

Career history
- Virginia Sailors (1968); Washington Redskins (1968–1969); New York Giants (1970); New England Patriots (1973)

Awards and highlights
- Second-team All-American (1967)

Career NFL statistics
- Games played: 37
- Games started: 13
- Stats at Pro Football Reference

Willie Green Banks (March 17, 1946 – July 2, 1989) was an American professional football offensive lineman in the National Football League (NFL) for the Washington Redskins, New York Giants, and New England Patriots. He played college football at Alcorn State University and was drafted 149th overall in the sixth round of the 1968 NFL/AFL draft.

== See also ==
- History of the New York Giants (1925-1978)
