= Allen Gallaher =

American football player (born 1950)

- Gallaher, circa 1977

No. 64
- Position: Offensive tackle

Personal information
- Born: November 30, 1950; San Fernando, California, U.S.
- Died: May 12, 1977 (aged 26); Clovis, New Mexico, U.S.
- Listed height: 6 ft 3 in (1.91 m)
- Listed weight: 250 lb (113 kg)

Career information
- High school: Sylmar (Los Angeles)
- College: USC
- NFL draft: 1973: 4th round, 82nd overall pick

Career history
- New England Patriots (1973–1974); BC Lions (1975–1976)
- Stats at Pro Football Reference

Allen Ross Gallaher (November 30, 1950 – May 12, 1977) was an American professional football offensive tackle who played for the New England Patriots of the National Football League (NFL). He played college football for the USC Trojans and was selected by the Patriots in the fourth round of the 1973 NFL draft.

== Early life ==
Allen Ross Gallaher was born on November 30, 1950, in San Fernando, California. He attended Sylmar High School in Los Angeles.

== College career ==
Gallaher enrolled at the University of Southern California to play college football for the Trojans. He was listed as being on the varsity team in 1969 but did not earn a letter. He was a three-year letterman from 1970 to 1972. He graduated with a bachelor's degree in religion.

== Professional career ==
Gallaher was selected by the New England Patriots in the fourth round, with the 82nd overall pick, of the 1973 NFL draft. He signed with the team on May 23. He missed the entire 1973 season due to injury. Gallaher played in all 14 games for the Patriots in 1974 as a reserve offensive tackle. On September 11, 1975, it was reported that he had been released, before the sixth game of the 1975 preseason.

A week later, the BC Lions of the Canadian Football League signed Gallaher to a five-day-trial. Later in September, he was promoted to the active roster to replace the recently-released offensive guard Curtis Wester. Gallaher played in six games for the Lions during the 1975 season as an offensive guard. He began the 1976 season as the team's starting left tackle but was moved to right guard seven games later due to Edgar Bell having suffered an injury. Gallaher played in ten games overall in 1976 before being placed on injured reserve with damaged knee cartilage. He died of a heart attack on May 12, 1977, while driving to his home in Clovis, New Mexico, a month before Lions training camp.

== Personal life ==
Gallaher was active in the Fellowship of Christian Athletes.

== See also ==
- List of gridiron football players who died during their careers
