= Josh Ashton =

American football player (1949–1993)

No. 31
- Position: Running back

Personal information
- Born: August 24, 1949; Eagle Lake, Texas, U.S.
- Died: October 4, 1993 (aged 44); Harris County, Texas, U.S.
- Listed height: 6 ft 1 in (1.85 m)
- Listed weight: 205 lb (93 kg)

Career information
- High school: Eagle Lake (TX)
- College: Tulsa
- NFL draft: 1971: 9th round, 209th overall pick

Career history
- New England Patriots (1972–1974); St. Louis Cardinals (1975)

Career NFL statistics
- Rushing attempts: 257
- Rushing yards: 994
- Total TDs: 4
- Stats at Pro Football Reference

Josh Ashton Jr. (August 24, 1949 – October 4, 1993) was an American professional football player who was a running back for four seasons in the National Football League (NFL) with the New England Patriots and St. Louis Cardinals. He also played one season in the Canadian Football League (CFL) with the BC Lions in 1971.
