= Julius Adams =

American football player (1948–2016)

No. 85, 69
- Position: Defensive lineman

Personal information
- Born: April 26, 1948; Macon, Georgia, U.S.
- Died: March 24, 2016 (aged 67); Irmo, South Carolina, U.S.
- Listed height: 6 ft 3 in (1.91 m)
- Listed weight: 270 lb (122 kg)

Career information
- High school: Macon (GA)
- College: Texas Southern
- NFL draft: 1971: 2nd round, 27th overall pick

Career history
- New England Patriots (1971–1985, 1987)

Awards and highlights
- Pro Bowl (1980); New England Patriots All-1970s Team; New England Patriots All-1980s Team; New England Patriots 35th Anniversary Team; New England Patriots 50th Anniversary Team

Career NFL statistics
- Games: 206
- Sacks: 80.5
- Stats at Pro Football Reference

Julius Thomas Adams Jr. (April 26, 1948 – March 24, 2016) was an American professional football player who spent his entire career as a defensive lineman for the New England Patriots in the National Football League (NFL). He played college football for the Texas Southern Tigers. Adams was selected by the Patriots in the second round of the 1971 NFL draft. He was selected to the Pro Bowl in 1980. He is second in New England Patriots history with 80.5 quarterback sacks, and fourth in games played with 206 (through 2025). He had three sacks in a December 19, 1976 playoff loss against the Oakland Raiders, which has been called one of the most controversial games in NFL history; and a key blocked field goal in another historically controversial game, a 3–0 win over the Miami Dolphins in 1982 during a snow storm, known as the "Snowplow Game".

== Early life ==
Adams was born on April 26, 1948, in Macon, Georgia. He attended Ballard-Hudson High School, where he was an honor student. His football idol, Baltimore Colts' Pro Football Hall of Fame offensive lineman Jim Parker had attended Ballard-Hudson.

Adams played on the school's football team, as a two-way player, under coach Robert Slocum. As a junior (1965) he was reported to be 6 ft 4 in (1.93 m) 235 lb (106.6 kg), playing both offensive and defensive tackle. As a senior, he was reported to be 6 ft 3 in (1.91 m) 250 lb (113.4 kg), playing tackle. He received the team's most valuable football player award in 1967. Adams received the Golden Helmet Award from the Coca-Cola Company as a senior. He wore jersey no. 72 in high school. Adams also threw the shot put for Monroe's track and field team.

== College career ==
Adams received scholarship offers from the University of California at Los Angeles and Michigan State University, among others, but chose to accept a full football scholarship to attend Texas Southern University in Houston. Texas Southern was part of the Southwestern Athletic Conference (SWAC). Adams was an engineering major at Texas Southern, focusing on architectural drafting.

After being a two-way player in high school, Adams became solely a defensive player at Texas Southern, which he believed helped his concentration. It has been stated he was a four-year starter at Texas Southern. It has also been reported he became a starter at defensive end as sophomore in 1968, and was switched to starting defensive tackle as a junior in 1969. He was a team tri-captain in 1969. During the 1969 season, he suffered a knee injury during a game that was expected to keep him out for up to three games; but after having his knee drained of fluid, he played the following week and did not miss a game.

After his 1969 season, the Dallas Cowboys and Atlanta Falcons tried to convince Adams to turn professional, but Adams' high school coach Robert Slocum convinced Adams it was important to stay in school and get his degree. In 1970 as a senior, the reportedly 6 ft 5 in (1.96 m) 270 lb (122.5 kg) Adams was named a team captain. He had an eye injury in the fall of 1970 that nearly blinded him. One of his teammates at Texas Southern was fellow senior and defensive tackle, and future Pittsburgh Steelers tackle, Ernie Holmes, who remained Adams' close friend until Holmes' death.

Adams was selected as second-team All-SWAC at defensive end after his sophomore season (1968). As a senior (1970), he was named first-team All-SWAC at defensive tackle, with Holmes selected as the other first-team All-SWAC defensive tackle. Adams was also named a Little All-American as a senior. He played in the 1971 Chicago Charities College All-Star Game against the Baltimore Colts prior to his rookie season in the NFL.

Adams also threw the javelin for Texas Southern's track and field team.

== Professional career ==
The New England Patriots drafted Adams in the second round of the 1971 NFL draft with the 27th overall pick. His first contract with the Patriots was for $25,000. That was the only season of his professional career when he used an agent to negotiate his contracts with the Patriots.

Adams became a starter at right defensive tackle in the fourth game of his rookie season (1971), replacing Houston Antwine who was injured in an early October game against the Baltimore Colts. The Patriots' coaching staff was impressed by Adams' combination of quickness, speed, and strength. The Associated Press named Adams Defensive Player of the Week for his performance in a December 5 upset over the Miami Dolphins, 34–13, in which he had seven solo tackles and three assisted tackles. Adams started 11 games at right defensive tackle that season, with five quarterback sacks. He was chosen to United Press International's (UPI) All-Rookie team in 1971, along with teammates Jim Plunkett and Randy Vataha. He was fifth in NFL Defensive Rookie of the Year voting.

Adams started 10 games in 1972, playing at left defensive end and left defensive tackle. He had four sacks and one fumble recovery that season. Before the season started, Adams was moved from tackle to defensive end in training camp, a position he preferred. He began the season as the Patriots starting left defensive end.

In the fifth game of the 1972 season against the New York Jets, Patriots coach John Mazur used Adams as a roverback, playing him as a linebacker, end, and tackle on defense; but this strategy was not successful. The following week, Mazur moved Adams to left tackle in place of Dave Rowe, believing that Adams' performance would improve from playing tackle rather than end. He continued at starting left tackle the next four weeks after that, but then suffered a knee injury and was put on the move list; with Rowe finishing out the season at starting left tackle.

In 1973, under new Patriots' head coach Chuck Fairbanks, Adams started all 14 Patriots game at right defensive tackle, with Rowe starting at left defensive tackle. Adams had a team-leading eight sacks, along with one fumble recovery. In 1974, the Patriots adopted a 3–4 defense, with Adams at right defensive end, Ray Hamilton at nose tackle, and Mel Lunsford at left defensive end. Adams again led the team with eight sacks. The Patriots finished the season 7–7, the first time they had not had a losing season since 1966. Adams was named as one of the NFL's top defensive linemen by Pro QB Magazine.

In late August 1975, Adams suffered a fractured bone in his foot and missed the first five games of the season. He started eight games that season, with four sacks. The Patriots fell back to a 3–11 record. In 1976, the Patriots were 11–3, the best record in team history. Adams started 14 games at right defensive end, with six sacks. Adams also was the team's top tackler at 47 among the defensive linemen in 1976, even though he was frequently double-teamed. He also had 12 quarterback pressures.

The Patriots lost in the divisional round of the 1976–77 playoffs to the Oakland Raiders, 24–21. Adams had three quarterback sacks against Hall of Fame quarterback Ken Stabler in that game, playing opposite the Raiders future Hall of Fame left offensive tackle, Art Shell. The Patriots were bitter about the loss and particularly about the game officials' decision making, with an outspoken Adams claiming after the game that the Patriots were "cheated" by an unwarranted roughing the passer penalty call against Ray Hamilton that gave the Raiders an opportunity to win the game in the final seconds. It has been called one of the most controversial games in NFL history. Much of the debate at the time focused on whether the penalty could even be called if the defender tipped the pass (a doubt Adams shared); but Stabler reportedly later told Boston sportswriter Will McDonough he did not think the force of Hamilton's hit merited a penalty in the first place, as he had been hit much worse without penalties being called during his career. Referee Ben Dreith, however, still maintained 25 years later that the hit was excessive. The Raiders went on to win Super Bowl XI that season.

Adams started 14 games at right defensive end in 1977 and had 9.5 sacks; with the Patriots still using the 3–4 defense. The Patriots led the NFL in sacks that season (58). Adams ended the season with 43 tackles. The Patriots finished 9–5 under coach Fairbanks. The Patriots went 11–5 in 1978, finishing first in the AFC East Division; however, during the season coach Fairbanks was suspended for two games after he accepted a job to coach at the University of Colorado. The Patriots, with Fairbanks as coach, lost in the divisional round of the playoffs to the Houston Oilers, 31–14. Adams played only one game in the 1978 season, after he suffered a fractured left scapula in the first game of the season against the Washington Redskins.

Adams returned in 1979 to play all 16 games, but started only two, under new head coach Ron Erhardt. He had six quarterback sacks, with the Patriots leading the NFL with a total of 57 quarterback sacks that season. Adams also had four forced fumbles and a fumble recovery. He also had 49 tackles and 13 quarterback pressures.

In 1980, Adams started all 16 games at right defensive end. He tied for the team lead with 8.5 sacks, and had three forced fumbles. It has also been stated he led the Patriots with nine sacks that season. He also had 59 tackles, and finished second on the team in 1980 with 13 quarterback pressures. Adams made his first and only Pro Bowl that season. He received the team's Jim Lee Hunt Memorial Award as the Patriots' outstanding lineman.

In 1981, Adams again started all 16 games at right defensive end, with 2.5 sacks on the season. He was eighth on the team in tackles with 54 solo tackles and 30 assists. In the 1982 strike-shortened season, he started all nine games at right defensive end, with two sacks, two forced fumbles and one fumble recovery. Adams finished second among Patriots' defensive linemen with 45 tackles. He once again was presented with the Jim Lee Hunt Memorial Award. During that season, Adams also made one of the biggest plays of his career, when he blocked an Uwe von Schamann field goal attempt in the Patriots 3–0 win over the Miami Dolphins in the controversial December 12, 1982 "Snowplow Game".

Adams started all 16 games at right defensive end in 1983. He was second on the team with eight sacks, and had two forced fumbles and one fumble recovery. He was again the top tackler among Patriots' defensive linemen in 1983 with a career-high total of 83 tackles, and was third with seven quarterback pressures. In 1984, he appeared in 16 games, starting only one, with Toby Williams now starting at right defensive end. He became a reserve in 1984 under head coach Ron Meyer, whose defensive philosophy clashed with Adams' career-long playing style. After eight games, Raymond Berry replaced Meyer as head coach in 1984.

The 36-year old Adams was the oldest defensive lineman playing in the 1984 NFL season. In an October 21 game against the Miami Dolphins, Adams blocked an Uwe von Schamann extra-point kicking attempt late in the first half. Adams only start that season came in the season's final game against the Indianapolis Colts on December 16, playing right defensive end. With the Patriots leading 13–10, Adams blocked a Raúl Allegre 42-yard field goal attempt with less than five minutes left in a game; which the Patriots went on to win 16–10. He was given a game ball for his effort. Adams had four sacks on the season. He had 34 tackles, seven quarterback pressures and one pass deflection.

Toward the end of the 1984 season, Adams announced he would return in 1985 to play one more season with the Patriots, believing that the Patriots would have a championship team in 1985. Going into the Patriots 1985 training camp, it was not certain the 37-year old Adams, still the oldest defensive lineman in the NFL, would make the team. He still wanted to play that season, believing the team could reach the Super Bowl. Adams also looked forward to the opportunity to play a full season under Raymond Berry, because Berry was constructing a team to win in the present, instead of building for the future.

Adams' play and leadership was indispensable in 1985. Berry called him a backbone of the team. Patriots tight end Lin Dawson said "He's a father figure, a friend, and a leader to this team". The Patriots finished the season 11–5, and reached the Super Bowl for the first time in team history.

In 1985, Adams started 12 of the 16 games in which he appeared during the regular season, at right end, after Toby Williams was injured. He had five sacks, two fumble recoveries and a forced fumble. As the season neared its end, Adams announced he would retire after the 1985 season. Before the team's final home game that season against the Cincinnati Bengals, on December 22, the Patriots honored Adams by making him the only Patriots' player introduced to the crowd before the game, receiving loud cheers from the Patriots' fans. The Patriots needed to win that game to make the playoffs. They defeated the Bengals, 34–23, clinching a berth in the wild card round of the playoffs.

Adams started at right end in the team's 26–14 wild card playoff victory over the New York Jets; the Patriot's 27–20 win over the Los Angeles Raiders in the divisional round; and 31–14 AFC championship game win over the Miami Dolphins, in which Adams recovered a fumble. All three Patriots victories were road games, and they were the first wild card team in NFL history to win three successive playoff road games. The Patriots win over the Dolphins in the Orange Bowl stadium was the team's first victory in Miami after 18 consecutive losses over 19 years. The Patriots played the 1985 Chicago Bears in Super Bowl XX. Some commentators, and the Pro Football Hall of Fame, consider this Bears team to be the best team in NFL history. The Patriots lost the Super Bowl, 46–10. Adams started the game and had two solo tackles and two assisted tackles.

Adams had played in a team-record 196 games at that time he retired after the Super Bowl. After retiring, Adams did not play in 1986. The 39-year old Adams came out of retirement in 1987 during the players' strike, to rejoin the Patriots. Most Patriots' players did not join the team during the strike. Adams stayed on the team even after the strike ended, and played in 10 games that season, but did not start any games.

Adams wore number 85 with the Patriots from 1971 to 1985. He was the last defensive player to wear an 80s number at the time he retired. The NFL restricted numbers 80 to 89 to wide receivers and tight ends beginning in 1973, but players in the league prior to 1973 were covered by a grandfather clause allowing them to wear their old numbers for the remainder of their careers. Adams wore number 69 when he returned in 1987.

Over his 16-year Patriots' career, Adams played in 206 games, started 158 games, had 80.5 sacks, forced at least 12 fumbles and recovered seven fumbles.

== Coaching career ==
Adams became defensive coordinator at Benedict College in Columbia, South Carolina, under head coach Harold Jackson. Jackson had been Adams's teammate on the Patriots, and was the wide receivers coach on the 1985 Patriots team that went to the Super Bowl. Jackson stated that Adams had an excellent relationship with the players he coached at Benedict, and emphasized to them the importance of their education over playing football. Adams also held a coaching position at Fort Valley State University in Georgia. He later coached with his son Keith Adams at the Georgia Prep Sports Academy.

== Legacy and honors ==
Former Patriots' coach Raymond Berry (1984 to 1989) said of Adams after his death that veteran leaders like Adams were "the backbone of our team. Julius went out and did his job professionally and unselfishly and in a masterful way, and was a real force. . . . if you were trying to shape the ideal personality and make up of a teammate, Julius would be the model". Adams was well known for keeping himself in excellent physical condition, for mentoring younger players, and as someone admired by his teammates. As to his physical conditioning, he believed running was more important than lifting weights, and speed was the most important ability for a player. His nickname on the Patriots was "The Jewel".

Adams was named to both the 35th and 50th anniversary Patriots' all-time teams. He is a member of both the Patriots’ 1970s and 1980s all-decade teams. He was honored with the Jim Lee Hunt Memorial Award as the team's outstanding lineman in both 1980 and 1982. He was also named to the Patriots' all-millennium team. Adams is second in career sacks by a Patriot, with 80.5; and fourth in games played, with 206 (through 2025).

In 2019, the Pro Football Hall of Fame listed Adams among the top 100 NFL players who attended HBCU (historically black colleges and universities) schools. Adams was posthumously inducted into Macon's Sports Hall of Fame. He is also a member of the Georgia High School Football Hall of Fame. He was among the finalists under consideration for induction into the Black College Football Hall of Fame's Class of 2024.

== Personal life and death ==
After retiring from professional football Adams lived in Atlanta, Georgia with his first wife Patricia Adams. During his career, Adams, Patricia and their four children lived on a 100-acre farm in Roberta, Georgia, near Macon, where he was licensed to breed Black Angus bulls. He also operated a Carvel Ice Cream store in Macon. He later married Terri (Rice) Adams, and lived in Irmo, South Carolina until his death on March 24, 2016. His son, Keith Adams, played in the NFL from 2001 to 2007. Adams and his son Keith were the third father-son combination to have both played in a Super Bowl.

Adams died on March 24, 2016, while in hospice care after suffering a stroke in October 2015. He was survived by his wife Terri, Keith Adams and three other children from his earlier marriage to Patricia Adams, and nine grandchildren.
