= Dave Rowe (American football) =

American football player and announcer (born 1945)

No. 76, 74
- Position: Defensive tackle

Personal information
- Born: June 20, 1945 (age 81); Neptune City, New Jersey, U.S.
- Listed height: 6 ft 7 in (2.01 m)
- Listed weight: 280 lb (127 kg)

Career information
- High school: Deptford Township (Deptford Township, New Jersey)
- College: Penn State (1963-1966)
- NFL draft: 1967: 2nd round, 53rd overall pick

Career history
- New Orleans Saints (1967–1970); New England Patriots (1971–1973); San Diego Chargers (1974–1975); Oakland Raiders (1975–1978); Baltimore Colts (1978)

Awards and highlights
- Super Bowl champion (XI); Pro Bowl (1968); Second-team All-East (1966)

Career NFL statistics
- Fumble recoveries: 9
- Sacks: 35.5
- Stats at Pro Football Reference

David Homeyer Rowe (born June 20, 1945) is an American former professional football player who was a defensive tackle in the National Football League (NFL). He played college football for the Penn State Nittany Lions. After his NFL career, he became a sports commentator. He played an important part in the Oakland Raiders' Super Bowl XI victory.

== Early life ==
Rowe was born on June 20, 1945 in Neptune City, New Jersey, and raised in Deptford Township, New Jersey. Rowe played high school football and basketball at Deptford Township High School, and was on the track and field team. He was the football team's top tackle from his sophomore to senior years, and stood 6 ft 6 in (1.98 m) 245 lbs. (111.1 kg) at the start of his senior year in September 1962. As a senior, he was named to the South Jersey All-Scholastic first team.

As a junior in 1962, he was the "bulwark" of Deptford's basketball team, and was named to the first-team Olympic Conference All-Star scholastic basketball team. As a senior in February 1963, he became the first Deptford basketball player to score over 1,000 points in a season. The 6 ft 6 in (1.98 m) 260 lb. (117.9 kg) Rowe also threw the shotput and discus on the school's track team. He was the Olympic Conference champion in discus.

Rowe's wife Faith was his high school sweetheart. He was also influenced by his high school coaches to attend college, and in his Christian faith. His high school football coach Roy Pickens observed Rowe's gregarious and friendly nature early on and his willingness to help others, in addition to his football prowess.

== College ==
Rowe played college football at Penn State (1963-66), where he was on the first team coached by Joe Paterno (1966). He was 6 ft 6 in and 274 lb. (124.3 kg) playing tackle on Penn State's freshman football team in 1963. On the varsity, he had some playing time as a sophomore (1964) and was a starter during his junior and senior years at defensive tackle (1965-66).

After defeating Maryland in the first game of his senior year, the newly married Rowe spent time with his wife and family that day and into the evening. He exceeded an 11 p.m. curfew set by new coach Joe Paterno, because Rowe did not believe Paterno would be concerned under the circumstances. However, Paterno berated Rowe for missing curfew and threw him off the team. Some of Rowe’s senior teammates went to Paterno seeking Rowe’s reinstatement by pointing out that Rowe, who did not drink alcoholic beverages, was not out carousing but was a married man celebrating a success with his wife and family. Paterno reinstated Rowe, but made him work his way back up to the starting unit, which Rowe did within a few days. Rowe became the first player from Paterno's time as Penn State's head coach to be drafted into the NFL.

In 1966, the Associated Press (AP) named Rowe second-team All-East at defensive tackle. He was selected to play in the East-West Shrine game, the Hula Bowl, and the Chicago College All-Star Game.

== Professional career ==
=== New Orleans Saints ===
The New Orleans Saints selected Rowe in the second round of the 1967 NFL/AFL draft (53rd overall). The Saints were an expansion team, and 1967 was their first season in the NFL. Rowe played for four seasons with the Saints (1967-70), starting every game each of those four seasons. He was the Saints left defensive tackle in 1967, and came in tied for fourth in the AP Defensive Rookie-of-the-Year voting, behind future Pro Football Hall of Famers Lem Barney and Alan Page, and Pro Bowl safety Rick Volk. United Press International (UPI) named him to its All-Rookie team.

He had 5.5 quarterback sacks as a rookie, second on the team to future Hall of Fame defensive end Doug Atkins's 9.5 sacks. Right defensive tackle Mike Tilleman had two sacks. The team ended its first season with a 3–11 record. Rowe suffered torn hand ligaments playing against fellow rookie Dick Hart of the Philadelphia Eagles in Week 10, and had surgery the day after the 1967 season ended.

Rowe and Tilleman switched positions in 1968, and Rowe continued to start every Saints game at right defensive tackle from 1968 to 1970; with Tilleman starting the majority of Saints games at left defensive tackle over that same time. In 1968, Rowe again had 5.5 sacks, and was selected for the first, and only time, to the Pro Bowl. He developed bone chips in his elbow that required post-season surgery again. The 1968 Saints defense led the NFL with the lowest pass completion percentage (41.8%), most fumble recoveries (26), and was third in total turnovers. The defense was spearheaded by the 38-year old Atkins, who finished with 12.5 sacks and was named second-team All-Pro; and 32-year old free safety Dave Whitsell with six interceptions.

Rowe had 4.5 sacks in 1969, but only one in 1970. The Saints never won more than five games in a season during Rowe's tenure with the new team.

In August 1970, Tom Fears, who had coached the Saints since their inception, was inducted into the Pro Football Hall of Fame. At mid-season, Fears reached an agreement with the Atlanta Falcons' Norm Van Brocklin to trade Rowe for a Falcons' running back to fill Fears’s perceived need for a better running back on the Saints. Fears had always treated Rowe fairly and explained his reasoning to Rowe directly; even telling Rowe that Van Brocklin thought the Falcons were getting the better deal. However, Saints owner John Mecom intervened and stopped the trade because he did not want to lose an established young player. Fears protested and Mecom replaced Fears with J. D. Roberts as head coach. Rowe understood the possibility of being traded was part of playing professional football, a fact that had to be accepted; and had no personal aversion to the trade.

=== Houston Oilers and New England Patriots ===
Despite Mecom having told Rowe that Rowe's future was with the Saints, in January 1971 the Saints traded Rowe and Ken Burrough to the Houston Oilers for Hoyle Granger, Charles Blossom, Terry Stoepel and a second-round draft pick. Rowe had been hoping to be traded. Five months later, the Oilers traded for Tilleman and by the Oilers' late summer training camp it appeared that the two tackles would be reunited on the Oilers starting defensive line once the 1971 season started.

However, Rowe would never play a regular season game for the Oilers. Less than two weeks before the season started, Oilers offensive lineman Elbert Drungo suffered a serious knee injury. Within days, on September 6, the Oilers traded Rowe to the New England Patriots for offensive lineman Tom Funchess. Rowe observed "'They say you're a piece of furniture to be moved around when you play football and I guess that's the way it is'". Drungo came back to start 11 games for the Oilers in 1971, and Funchess started in only two.

It has also been reported that the Oilers traded Rowe because of concerns over a bad back. After being traded, he had back surgery and went on to play as a starter for the Patriots. At New England, he played for three seasons under three different coaches. The Patriots were 6–8 under John Mazur in 1971; 3–11 under Mazur and Phil Bengston in 1972; and 5–9 under Chuck Fairbanks in 1973. He played at left tackle for the Patriots, starting nine games in 1971, 10 games in 1972 and all 14 games in 1973.

=== San Diego Chargers, Oakland Raiders, Baltimore Colts ===
In late August 1974, the Patriots traded Rowe to the San Diego Chargers for a 1975 sixth round draft choice, as Fairbanks was focused on developing the Patriots younger players. Rowe started 14 games at left tackle. When Chargers defensive team captain Coy Bacon resigned that position to protest Monday team practices, coach Tommy Prothro named Rowe captain. Rowe finished his eighth consecutive losing season with the 5–9 Chargers.

On September 23, 1975, one game into the 1975 season, Rowe, still the Chargers' defensive captain, was traded to the Oakland Raiders for an undisclosed draft choice. He played under Hall of Fame coach John Madden during his time in Oakland. Although he only started one game for the Raiders in the 1975 regular season, he would be on a winning team, and in the playoffs, for the first time. The Raiders finished the season 11–3, losing in the American Football Conference Championship Game to the Pittsburgh Steelers, 16–10. Because of an injury to defensive end Tony Cline before the AFC divisional round playoff game against the Cincinnati Bengals, Rowe received greater playing time in that game.

In 1976, he started all 14 games for the Raiders at nose tackle/nose guard/middle guard. The 1976 Raiders defense used a three-man defensive line with Rowe in the middle and Otis Sistrunk and John Matuszak as defensive ends; and four linebackers (future Hall of Famer Ted Hendricks, Phil Villapiano, Monte Johnson and Willie Hall). He had four sacks, his most since 1969. However, the focus of the middle guard in Madden's defense was to absorb one or two blockers and free up the linebackers to make plays, a role suited to Rowe's size, skill set and experience.

The Raiders were 13–1, and went on to win Super Bowl XI, 32–12 over the Minnesota Vikings. This was the first use of a three-man defensive line in the Super Bowl. Rowe experienced a range of conflicting thoughts and emotions before the game, and felt he lacked the right motivation. He spoke with former Baltimore Colts linebacker Don Shinnick, who used the Bible to help Rowe gain focus and perspective going into the game, which Rowe then tried to approach with an attitude of humility and simply trying to play his best, without worrying about what others might think.

Rowe played an important role in the game at nose guard; overpowering Vikings future Hall of Fame center Mick Tingelhoff during the game; and twice blocking passes and/or batting the ball out of future Hall of Fame quarterback Fran Tarkenton's hands. Rowe had suffered a painful shoulder injury in the AFC divisional round playoff game against the Patriots, and used nerve blockers to play against the Steelers in the AFC Championship game and in the Super Bowl.

In 1977, his 10th year in the NFL, Rowe started all 14 games as the Raiders' nose tackle between Sistrunk and Matuszak. The Raiders had an 11–3 record and reached the AFC Championship game for a third consecutive year, losing to the Denver Broncos, 20–17. The key play of the game occurred after Rowe had the wind knocked out of him and was replaced by Mike McCoy. Denver running back Rob Lytle appeared to fumble at the Raiders two-yard line after a hard hit by Raiders' safety Jack Tatum, with McCoy recovering the fumble and running up field, possibly on his way to a touchdown for the Raiders. However, the officials ruled the play had ended before the fumble, the Broncos kept the ball and then scored on the next play giving them a 14–3 lead, instead of potentially being behind the Raiders 10–7.

In 1978, the Raiders released Rowe after one game (in which he started), and he was quickly signed by the Baltimore Colts. He started 10 games for the Colts, originally replacing the injured Herb Orvis. Rowe had 2.5 or three sacks playing both left and right tackle. This was his 12th and final year in the NFL. The Colts cut him the following August before the 1979 season started.

Over his 12-year career, Rowe started 144 games as an interior defensive lineman, with nine fumble recoveries and 35.5 sacks. During his career, he had back, shoulder, elbow and hand surgeries.

== Broadcasting career ==
After retiring from the NFL in 1979, Rowe worked as a sportscaster for NBC Sports on its Sportsworld series, where he covered sumo, weightlifting and other "non-traditional" sports. In 1987, Rowe was the color analyst alongside Gayle Sierens, who became the first female NFL play-by-play announcer when she called a Seattle Seahawks–Kansas City Chiefs matchup for NBC. He later broadcast college football games for Raycom and Jefferson Pilot, and won an Emmy Award for his last broadcast, where he provided commentary on a game between Central Michigan and Georgia in 2008.

== Personal life ==
During the off seasons in his playing career, Rowe, who had earned his college degree in education, was a schoolteacher in Almonesson, New Jersey, near Deptford, where he resided with his wife and children. He ran a farm with two others near Seagrove, North Carolina, and used his Super Bowl winnings to buy a tractor. In 1981, he was inducted into the Gloucester County Sports Hall of Fame.

Rowe is a devout Christian and co-founded the Professional Athletes Outreach ministry with eleven other NFL players; he also spoke on two Billy Graham crusades and attended a White House prayer breakfast. He had lunch with President Gerald Ford. An avid stamp collector, Rowe did advertisements for the United States Postal Service.

Rowe lived in Asheboro, North Carolina, from 1975 to 2007, when he moved to Boone, North Carolina. He has three children, Dawn, Kara, and Mark, and has been married to his wife Faith since 1966. He worked for over 20 years as the director of member and public relations for Randolph Electric Membership Corporation.
