= Steve King (American football) =

American football player (born 1951)

Profile
- Position: Linebacker

Personal information
- Born: June 10, 1951 (age 75); McAlester, Oklahoma, U.S.

Career information
- College: Tulsa

Career history
- 1973–1981: New England Patriots
- Stats at Pro Football Reference

George Stephen King (born June 10, 1951) is an American former professional football player who was a linebacker for the New England Patriots of the National Football League (NFL) from 1973 to 1981. He played college football for the Tulsa Golden Hurricane. He was named to the New England Patriots All-1970s team.
