= Peter Hadhazy =

American football executive (1944–2006)

Pete Hadhazy
- Born: Peter Hadhazy; February 9, 1944; Debrecen, Hungary
- Died: April 3, 2006 (aged 62); New York City, U.S.
- Occupation: Sports team executive
- Years active: 1976-2006, his death
- Spouse(s): Rita, ?-2006 (his death)
- Children: 3, daughters Deana and Andrea, son James

Peter Hadhazy (Hungarian: Hadházy Péter; February 9, 1944 – April 3, 2006), was an American football executive, who served as the General Manager of the Cleveland Browns from 1976 to 1981 and also as an executive for the National Football League (NFL), the short-lived United States Football League (USFL) and the World League of American Football (WLAF).

Born in Debrecen, Hungary, Hadhazy moved to the US with his parents during the Hungarian Revolution of 1956. He joined the NFL as a part-time employee in high school, and attended Iona College on a tennis scholarship. He was hired by the league office after graduation and became its director of player personnel in 1969.

In July 1971, Hadhazy became administrative assistant to Upton Bell, general manager of the New England Patriots. He was later promoted to assistant general manager. The Browns hired him as executive vice president before the start of the 1976 season and added the title of general manager in 1977.

Hadhazy left the Browns to return to the NFL office after the 1980 season ended. He joined the USFL in 1982 and served as its director of operations until the league folded in 1986.

After the USFL folded, Hadhazy returned to the NFL, where he served in numerous capacities. He served as a general manager of the Ohio Glory in the World League from 1991–92, as the labor operations director for the league's Management Council and, at the time of his death, the NFL's director of game operations.

== Death ==
Hadhazy died in New York City after a brief illness at the age of 62. He was survived by his wife, Rita, two daughters, Andrea and Deana, and a son, James.
