= John Mazur =

American gridiron football player and coach (1930–2013)

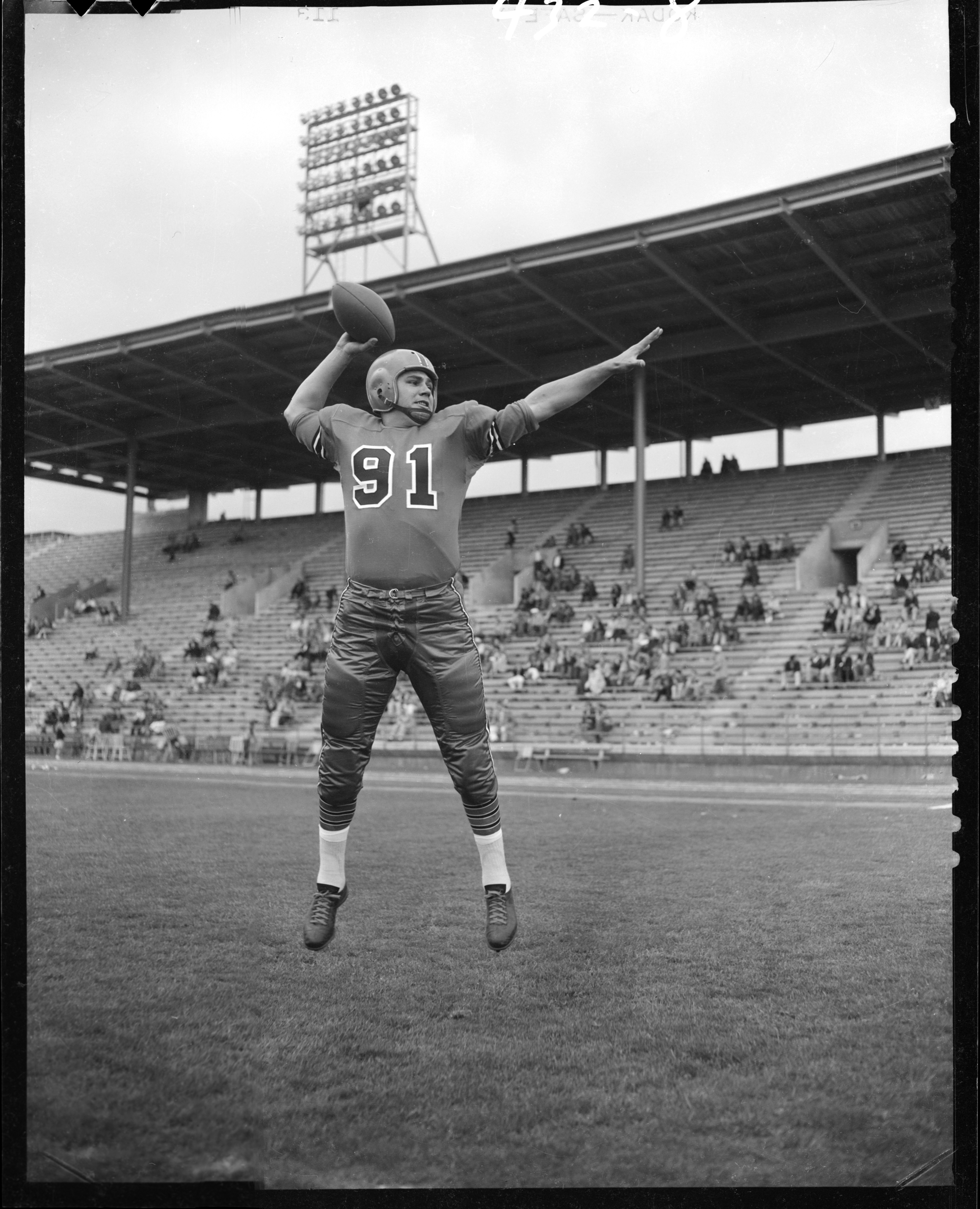
- Mazur in 1954 with the BC Lions

Personal information
- Born: June 17, 1930; Plymouth, Pennsylvania, U.S.
- Died: November 1, 2013 (aged 83); Mount Laurel, New Jersey, U.S.

Career information
- High school: Plymouth (PA)
- College: Notre Dame

Career history
- Buffalo Bills (1962–1968) Wide receivers coach/offensive backfield coach; Boston Patriots (1969–1970) Offensive backfield coach; Boston/New England Patriots (1970–1972) Head coach; Philadelphia Eagles (1973–1975) Defensive backs coach; Philadelphia Eagles (1976) Defensive coordinator/defensive backs coach; New York Jets (1977–1978) Defensive backs coach; New York Jets (1979–1980) Defensive coordinator

Awards and highlights
- National champion (1949)

Head coaching record
- Regular season: 9–21 (.300)
- Coaching profile at Pro Football Reference

John Edward Mazur (June 17, 1930 – November 1, 2013) was an American gridiron football player and coach. He was played college football as a quarterback at the University of Notre Dame. Mazur served as head coach for the New England Patriots of the National Football League (NFL) from 1970 to 1972.

== Career ==
Mazur grew up in Plymouth, Pennsylvania where he graduated in Plymouth High School's class of 1948. His outstanding quarterbacking skills caught the attention of Notre Dame coaches, leading him to play for the Fighting Irish from 1949 to 1951, starting for the 1951 squad that finished 7–2–1. The following year, Mazur went into the Marine Corps, playing quarterback for both the Quantico and Camp Pendleton Marines. Upon his discharge in 1954, Mazur headed to Canada, where he spent one year with the BC Lions of the Canadian Football League before suffering a career-ending ankle injury.

In 1955, Mazur entered the coaching ranks, spending the first of three years as an assistant at Tulane University. He followed that with one year at Marquette University in 1958, before heading east to work three years in a similar capacity for Boston University.

On January 22, 1962, Mazur was hired as backfield coach of the American Football League Buffalo Bills, spending seven seasons with the team as offensive coordinator, helping them capture AFL titles in both 1964 and 1965. By his final year with Buffalo in 1968, Mazur had seen the team collapse with the worst record in professional football, a dubious distinction that helped them select O. J. Simpson in the NFL draft.

Looking for other options, Mazur was hired as an assistant with the Boston Patriots on February 6, 1969. However, the team struggled under new head coach Clive Rush, who resigned on November 3, 1970, elevating Mazur to his first and only head coaching role.

Mazur was re-hired at the end of the 1970 NFL season, and selected quarterback Jim Plunkett with the first pick in the 1971 draft. Leading the team to a 6–8 mark that year, which included upsets of the Miami Dolphins, Baltimore Colts and Oakland Raiders, the team enjoyed its best record since 1966, and Mazur was awarded a new contract with a substantial pay increase. That excitement would be short-lived as the Patriots won only two of their first nine games. Mazur then resigned on November 13, 1972, one day after a 52–0 shutout by Miami, and was replaced by Phil Bengtson.

Mazur would resurface the next year as defensive backs coach with the Philadelphia Eagles, and would survive the dismissal of much of the coaching staff following the end of the 1975 NFL season. However, after just one year working under Dick Vermeil, Mazur left in 1977 to join former Eagles assistant Walt Michaels, who had been hired as head coach of the New York Jets.

After two years as defensive backs coach with the Jets, Mazur was promoted to defensive coordinator in 1979, helping the team to its second straight 8–8 season. The following year, In December, he announced that he would be retiring to battle the effects of Parkinson's disease.
