= Phil Bengtson =

American football player and coach (1913–1994)

Personal information
- Born: July 17, 1913; Roseau, Minnesota, U.S.
- Died: December 18, 1994 (aged 81); San Diego, California. U.S.

Career information
- College: Minnesota

Career history
- San Francisco 49ers (1951–1958) Defensive coordinator; Green Bay Packers (1959–1967) Defensive coordinator; Green Bay Packers (1968–1970) Head coach; San Diego Chargers (1971) Defensive coordinator; New England Patriots (1972) Head coach (interim, final 5 games)

Awards and highlights
- As a player: National champion (1934); Second-team All-American (1934); First-team All-Big Ten (1934); As an assistant coach: 2× Super Bowl champion (I, II); 5× NFL champion (1961, 1962, 1965, 1966, 1967); Green Bay Packers Hall of Fame

Head coaching record
- Regular season: 21–25–1 (.457)
- Coaching profile at Pro Football Reference
- Executive profile at Pro Football Reference

John Phillip Bengtson (July 17, 1913 – December 18, 1994) was an American football player and coach. He was a longtime assistant coach in college football and the National Football League (NFL), chiefly remembered as the successor to Vince Lombardi as head coach of the Green Bay Packers in 1968.

== Career ==
A native of Roseau, Minnesota, Bengston played offensive tackle under Bernie Bierman at the University of Minnesota during the 1930s. In 1934, he earned All-America honors with the Golden Gophers, working in tandem with a player who went to coaching immortality: quarterback Bud Wilkinson.

Bengtson took his first assistant coaching job at the University of Missouri in 1935, but soon returned to his alma mater as line coach, staying through the 1939 season. Beginning in 1940, he moved to Stanford University, where he served as an assistant coach for twelve years. Bengtson moved to the professional level in 1952 with the nearby San Francisco 49ers.

In seven seasons with the Niners, Bengtson served under three head coaches: (Buck Shaw, Red Strader, Frankie Albert) before being dismissed with Albert after the 1958 season. Soon after, he was one of the first four assistants hired in Lombardi's first week with the Packers in early February 1959.

Bengtson was the only assistant coach to stay for the entire nine-year tenure of Lombardi (1959–1967). His work as defensive coordinator of the Packers established his coaching ability and put him in line to succeed Lombardi. From 1961 to 1967, the Packers captured five NFL titles and the first two Super Bowls. The three consecutive league titles (1965–1967) remains as the only NFL three-peat since the playoff era began in 1933.

Bengtson was promoted to head coach following the 1967 season; his low key approach was in sharp contrast to the often-volatile Lombardi, who remained as general manager for a year. With the aging of key players, this translated into mediocrity for the franchise. The Packers were 20–21–1 in his three seasons as head coach, and finished third in the four-team Central division each year. After a 6–8 record in 1970, he was relieved of his duties, replaced by Missouri head coach Dan Devine for 1971. Devine lasted four seasons with the Packers, through 1974, then moved back to the collegiate level at the University of Notre Dame. Lombardi's former quarterback, Bart Starr, became the head coach of the Packers in 1975. In 1985, Bengston was inducted into the Green Bay Packers Hall of Fame.

Bengtson resurfaced in 1971 with the San Diego Chargers for a season and then with the New England Patriots, becoming the interim head coach of the Patriots in late 1972. He was later named the team's director of pro scouting, staying through 1974.

== Personal ==
After a long illness, Bengtson died at age 81 at his home in San Diego on December 18, 1994.

== Head coaching record ==
Team	Year	Regular season					Postseason			
Team	Year	Won	Lost	Ties	Win ratio	Finish	Won	Lost	Win percentage	Result
GB	1968	6	7	1	.464	3rd in NFL Central	–	–	–	–
GB	1969	8	6	0	.571	3rd in NFL Central	–	–	–	–
GB	1970	6	8	0	.429	3rd in NFC Central	–	–	–	–
GB Total		20	21	1	.488		–	–	–	
NE*	1972	1	4	0	.200	5th in AFC East	–	–	–	–
NE Total		1	4	0	.200		–	–	–	
Total		21	25	1	.457		–	–	–	

* Interim head coach
