= Judy Ho =

Taiwanese-American neuropsychologist and media personality

- Born: Taipei, Taiwan
- Citizenship: United States; Taiwan
- Education: University of California, Berkeley (BA, BS); University of California, San Diego (MA, PhD)
- Relatives: Maria Ho (sister)
- Scientific career
- Fields: Clinical psychology
- Workplaces: Pepperdine University
- Website: drjudyho.com

Judy Ho (commonly known as Dr. Judy Ho or Dr. Judy) is a Taiwanese-American clinical psychologist.

Ho appears on national television and radio broadcasts as a psychology expert, panelist, narrator and host. hosted the CBS syndicated talk show Face the Truth (2018) alongside Vivica Fox, was panelist on more than 200 episodes of The Dr. Drew Show from 2013 to 2016, and co-hosted Season 12, 13, and 14 of The Doctors.

Ho maintains a private practice based in Los Angeles, California, while working as a tenured associate professor of psychology at Pepperdine University's Graduate School of Education and Psychology, where she has taught since 2010.

== Early life and education ==
Born in Taipei, Taiwan, Ho is fluent in Mandarin. She has dual U.S. citizenship.

Ho graduated from the University of California, Berkeley, with two bachelor's degrees and earned her master's degree and Ph.D. from the University of California, San Diego. She was licensed by the California Board of Psychology in 2009 and received her board-certification by the American Board of Professional Psychology in 2011. Ho became double-board certified through the National Board of Forensic Evaluators in 2015, upon earning her diplomate as a Board Certified Forensic Mental Health Evaluator. In 2019, she became board certified by the American Academy of Pediatric Neuropsychology.

== Career ==
Ho is the founder and executive director of the STAGES Project, a not-for-profit prevention program for at-risk youth, which utilizes arts and music as a therapeutic intervention for at-risk students. In 2016, Ho created and implemented PEP4SAFE, a scientifically driven, no-cost psychoeducational program for parents and teachers in various school districts of Los Angeles, CA, for which she acts as the Principal Investigator.

=== Consulting work ===
Ho has served as a forensic or neuropsychological consultant for multiple national organizations and treatment centers, including the National Institute of Mental Health's Community Partners in Care Project (2008–2011), Centers for Disease Control's Legacy Project (2011–2015), the Los Angeles County Department of Mental Health (2011–present), Kaiser Permanente (2013–present), Promises Treatment Center (2013–2017), Bridges to Recovery (2011–2020), Clearview Treatment Centers (2012–2019), Pure Recovery California (2016–2018), Milestones Ranch Malibu (2017–present), and the Center for Professional Recovery (2017–2018).

She serves on many boards of directors, including board chair on the ABPP Examination Committee (2016–present), Treasurer, President Elect, and Board of Directors of the American Academy of Pediatric Neuropsychology, Board of Directors of Girl Scouts of Greater Los Angeles, and Chair of the Pepperdine University Graduate and Professional Schools Institutional Review Board (IRB).

=== Author ===
On August 20, 2019, Ho's first book Stop Self-Sabotage: Six Steps to Unlock Your True Motivation, Harness Your Willpower, and Get Out of Your Own Way was published by HarperCollins.

On November 9, 2021, Ho's second book I'll Give It To You Straight-Ish: What Your Teen Wants You To Know co-authored by Max Dubrow was published by Flashpoint.

On March 26, 2024, Ho's third book The New Rules of Attachment: How to Heal Your Relationships, Reparent Your Inner Child, and Secure Your Life Vision was published by Hachette Book Group.

Ho has regularly written and contributed to various print and online publications, offering psychological analysis, professional advice and clinical research to trending news topics and breaking stories, some publications have included Psychology Today, Teen Vogue, Yahoo Lifestyle, Life & Style, Us Weekly, and Bustle Magazine. She also contributes clinical research manuscripts to national and international psychological journals, and has written chapter contributions for mental health textbooks.

== Television and radio ==
The Doctors

Ho was a co-host on the CBS syndicated, Emmy Award winning daytime talk show The Doctors, produced by Jay McGraw and Stage 29 Productions, between 2017 and 2020 (seasons 10–12). She was also a guest co-host on Season 13.

=== Face the Truth ===
Season 1 of the CBS syndicated daytime talk show Face the Truth, produced by Jay McGraw and Stage 29 Productions, premiered nationwide on September 10, 2018, hosted by Dr. Judy, Vivica A. Fox, Rosie Mercado, Areva Martin, and Judge "Scary Mary" Mary Chrzanowski.

=== SuperCharged Life with Dr. Judy ===
Season 1 of the Supercharged Life with Dr. Judy podcast, produced by Stage 29 Productions, premiered nationwide on March 24, 2021, hosted by Ho.

=== Other ===
Having a long-standing professional friendship with Dr. Drew Pinsky, Ho joins him on-air to co-host Dr. Drew Midday Live on KABC 790 radio, which broadcasts in Los Angeles and San Francisco. On the same station, she offers a psychological POV, advice and analysis as a guest expert on the McIntyre In The Morning.

== Filmography ==
Ho's television credits include the following (with detailed listing on IMDb:

Television

- Today (2025: 1 episode)
- 48 Hours (2024: 1 episode)
- History's Greatest Mysteries (2024: 1 episode)
- World's Most Evil Killers (2024: 1 episode)
- NBC News Daily (2024: 1 episode)
- The News on Merit Street (2024: recurring expert)
- Court TV – Closing Arguments with Vinnie Politan (2023–2025: recurring expert)
- Court TV – Vinnie Politan Investigates (2024 – 2025: recurring expert)
- Dr. Death: Cutthroat Conman (2023)
- Myth of the Zodiac Killer (2023: recurring expert)
- Autopsy (2022 – 2023: recurring expert)
- Access Daily (2019 – 2022: recurring expert)
- Morning Express with Robin Mead (2019 – 2022: recurring expert)
- Netflix – Crime Scene: Vanishing at the Cecil Hotel (2021)
- Access Hollywood (2019–2021: recurring expert)
- Inside Edition (2019–2020: recurring expert)
- Daily Mail TV (2019–2020: recurring expert)
- The Doctors (2019–2020: season co-host)
- Dr. Phil (2020: clinical psychologist expert)
- Oxygen TV Movie – Golden State Killer: Main Suspect (2018)
- Lifetime TV Movie – JonBenet's Mother: Victim or Killer (2016)
- Dr. Drew On Call (2013–2016: 203 episodes)
- Face The Truth (2018–2019: 115 episodes)
- The Doctors (2017–2018: 82 episodes)
- Motive to Murder (2016–2017: 23 episodes)
- It Takes A Killer (2016–2017: 18 episodes)
- Fox 11 News (2015–2018: 17 episodes)
- CNN Newsroom (2013–2018: 14 episodes)
- Crime Watch Daily (2016–2018: 14 episodes)
- MichaeLA (2016–2018: 14 episodes)
- CNN Newsroom (2013–2018: 14 episodes)
- Deep Undercover (2016–2017: 10 episodes)
- On The Story with Erica Hill (2016–2018: 7 episodes)
- The Daily Share (2015–2016: 7 episodes)
- Jane Velez-Mitchell (2014: 7 episodes)
- Nancy Grace (2013–2015: 6 episodes)
- Pretty Bad Girls (2012–2013: 6 episodes)
- Deadly Sins (2016–2017: 5 episodes)
- TakePart Live (2014: 5 episodes)
- Crime & Justice (2017–2018: 5 episodes)
- Evil Genius (2017: 4 episodes)
- Inside Edition (2017–2018: 3 episodes)
- Across America with Carol Costello (2017–2018: 3 episodes)
- Murderous Affairs (2017: 3 episodes)
- CNN Tonight (2015–2018: 3 episodes)
- Murder Among Friends (2016–2017: 3 episodes)
- Blood Relatives (2015–2016: 3 episodes)
- KCAL 9 News (2015–2016: 3 episodes)
- True Nightmares (2016: 3 episodes)
- Snapped: Killer Couples (2015–2016: 3 episodes)
- Hollywood Scandals (2013–2014: 3 episodes)
- Mind Field (2017–2019: 2 episodes)
- CBS 2 News (2015–2016: 2 episodes)
- Momsters: When Moms Go Bad (2015: 2 episodes)
- The Daily Helpline (2014: 2 episodes)
- Wicked Attraction (2013: 2 episodes)
- Morning Express (2019: 1 episode)
- Ancient Aliens (2018: 1 episode)
- Early Start (2017: 1 episode)
- I Knew My Murderer (2017: 1 episode)
- You Can Do Better (2017: 1 episode)
- Good Morning Britain (2016: 1 episode)
- Outside the Lines (2016: 1 episode)
- Death By Gossip with Wendy Williams (2015: 1 episode)
- Killer Kids (2015: 1 episode)
- Marriage Boot Camp (2015: 1 episode)
- The Insider (2015: 1 episode)
- ABC 7 Eyewitness News (2014: 1 episode)
- Piers Morgan Live (2013: 1 episode)
- Braxton Family Values (2012: 1 episode)
