= Nicole, Erica and Jaclyn Dahm =

American models (born 1977)

Nicole, Erica, and Jaclyn Dahm
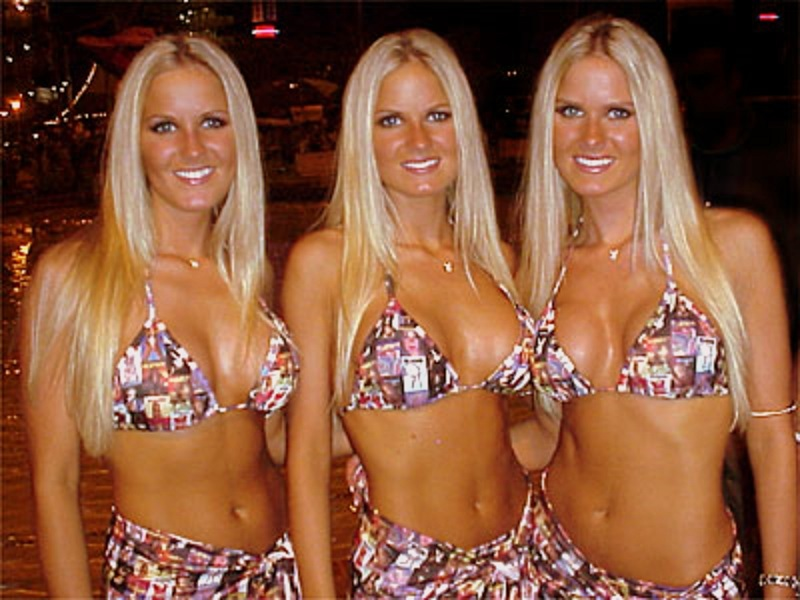
- Dahm triplets in 1998

Playboy centerfold appearance
- December 1998
- Preceded by: Tiffany Taylor
- Succeeded by: Jaime Bergman

Personal details
- Born: December 12, 1977 (age 48) Minneapolis, Minnesota, U.S.
- Height: 5 ft 8 in (1.73 m)

Nicole, Erica, and Jaclyn Dahm, commonly known as the Dahm triplets (born December 12, 1977), are American triplets from Minnesota. The Dahm triplets have appeared on many television shows and movies, and have appeared in magazines such as Teen and Playboy. They are best known as being the second set of triplets to be featured in the US edition of Playboy; the first was a set of Brazilian triplets who were featured in November 1993.

== Early lives ==
The triplets grew up in Jordan, Minnesota, and attended Jordan's public schools. Originally intending to become nurses, they enrolled at the University of Minnesota after high school.

== Careers ==
=== Playboy careers ===
They were the Playmates centerfold for the Girls of the Big Ten December 1998 issue of Playboy magazine. According to their Playboy interview, Nicole and Erica have tiny black ink dots (one and two dots, respectively and Jaclyn has no mark) tattooed onto their buttocks, which their parents used to distinguish the three girls when they were babies. They tried out for Playboy's "Girls of the Big Ten" issue on the suggestion of their father.

They were the second set of triplets to be featured in the United States edition of Playboy, after "The Trio from Rio, The Amazing Brazilian Triplets" who were featured in the November 1993 issue. The Dahm sisters were featured in several issues of Playboy, but appeared on only one cover, that of Playboy Australia for June 1999.

=== Television careers ===
The trio appeared on the show Boy Meets World in 1999. The trio was also on the Fox reality show Renovate My Family, where Jay McGraw was the host. All three appeared on Family Feud with their older sister Lisa, and father Bob. Along with their father and an assigned interior decorator, they also competed in and won the reality competition show House Wars; their prize for winning was to keep the house which they had renovated.

The triplets more recently appeared as regular members of the mob on the final weeks of NBC's game show 1 vs. 100. The triplets played as one mob member.

The triplets have appeared on episodes of The Doctors, where Jay McGraw is a producer, discussing a variety of topics, principally around their pregnancies, which all happened about the same time.

Original Air Date	Topic	Episode
August 20, 2009	female fertility and pregnancy issues	303
October 7, 2009	pregnancy issues and on-stage ultrasound exam	332
February 9, 2010	preparing for childbirth and delivery	397
March 17, 2010	preparing for childbirth and delivery	424
May 11, 2010	breast-feeding and infant issues	452

=== Internet careers ===
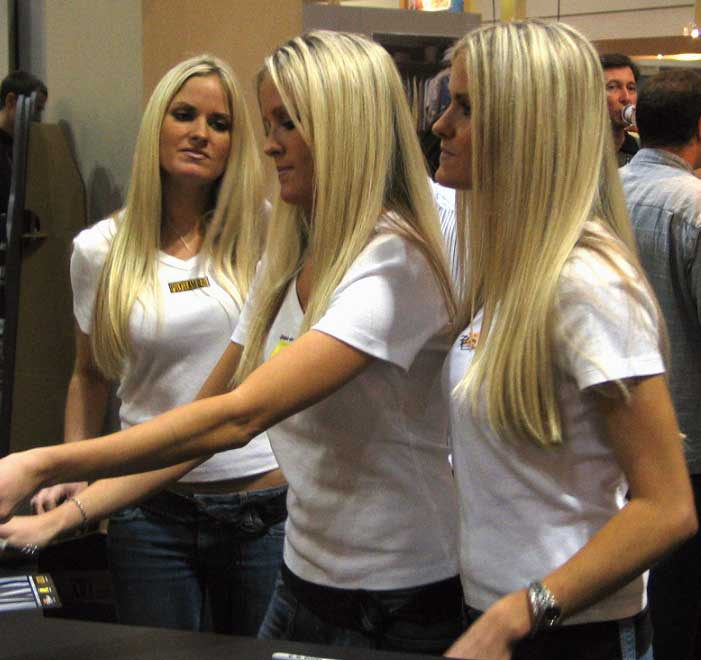
Dahm triplets at trade show in 2005

The Dahm Triplets started their own cooking website called "Triplets Gourmet", which is no longer functioning. In addition, the triplets have opened up an account on YouTube also called "TripletsGourmet." Their first video is their collection of recipes and the usefulness of freezing gourmet food. Only one video was made and posted, in 2008.

== Personal lives ==
=== Nicole ===
Nicole married Michael Kelly on April 1, 2009. She gave birth to their daughter on January 14, 2010 and their son on December 2012.

=== Erica ===
Erica married Jay McGraw, the son of Phil McGraw from the Dr. Phil television program. She gave birth to a daughter on March 18, 2010, and a son on August 31, 2011.

=== Jaclyn ===
Jaclyn married William Tate Dolan in 2002. She gave birth to their daughter on February 3, 2010 and their son was born on November 3, 2013.

== Filmography ==
- Playboy's Video Centerfold
- Playboy's Playmates on the Catwalk
- Juwanna Mann
- Pauly Shore is Dead
- Nudity Required
- Relic Hunter
- Battle Dome
- Boy Meets World

Heather Kozar	Julia Schultz	Marliece Andrada	Holly Joan Hart	Deanna Brooks	Maria Luisa Gil
Lisa Dergan	Angela Little	Vanessa Gleason	Laura Cover	Tiffany Taylor	Dahm triplets
