= Face the Truth (talk show) =

American syndicated talk show (2018–2019)

- Starring: Vivica A. Fox; Jon Taffer; Judy Ho; Rosie Mercado; Mary Chrzanowski; Areva Martin
- Country of origin: United States
- Original language: English
- No. of seasons: 1

Production
- Executive producers: Jay McGraw; Phil McGraw
- Production companies: Keller Noll; Stage 29 Productions

Original release
- Release: September 10, 2018 – May 22, 2019

Face the Truth is an American syndicated panel talk show hosted by Vivica A. Fox, which ran from September 2018 to May 2019. It was distributed by CBS Television Distribution (now known as CBS Media Ventures).

== Series background ==
In March 2018, CBS announced that Face the Truth would be coming to its daytime television lineup. The series was produced by Jay McGraw and Stage 29 Productions and had recruited panelists such as Jon Taffer, Judy Ho, and Rosie Mercado. Phil McGraw also served as an executive producer on the series. The show was filmed at Paramount Studios’ Stage 30 and used the same set as fellow CBS talk show The Doctors.

It was described as a series focused on conflict resolution, with guests presenting problems and receiving advice from the panel of experts. The program also featured participation from a live studio audience that offered opinions on the problems presented in each episode.

The show premiered on September 10, 2018. After one season, CBS announced the program’s cancellation in April 2019.

== Cast ==
=== Main ===
- Vivica A. Fox as Herself (Host)
- Judy Ho as Herself (Host)
- Rosie Mercado as Herself (Host)
- Mary Chrzanowski as Herself (Host)
- Areva Martin as Herself (Host)

=== Guest stars ===
- Bradley Pfanner as Himself (Private Investigator)
- Farrah Laurel Abraham as (Herself)
- Slade Smiley as (Himself)
- Gretchen Rossi as (Herself)
- Tyrone Evans Clark as Himself (Ty)
- Kim DePaola as (Herself)
- Keyaira Hamilton as (Herself)
- Heavenly Kimes as (Herself)
- Robert L. Wilson as (Himself)
- Kelsey Cook as (Herself)
- Tarek El Moussa as Himself (Panelist)
- Alex Thomas as Himself (Panelist)
