= Rosie Mercado =

American actress

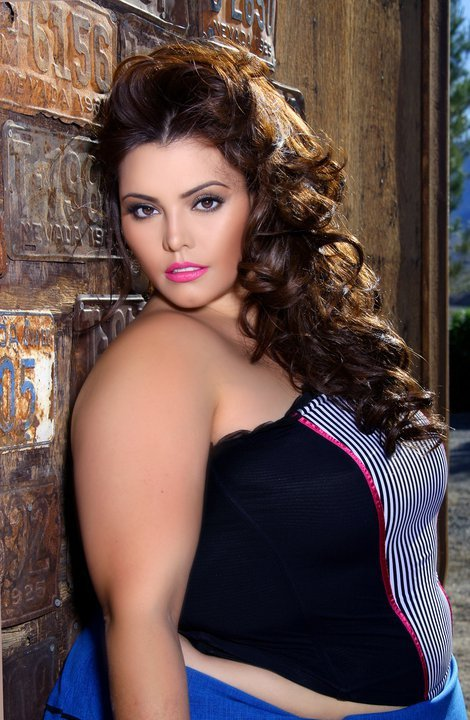
- Mercado before weight loss
- Born: March 28, 1980 (age 46); Los Angeles, California, U.S.
- Education: University of Nevada, Las Vegas; Tony Robbins Mastery University
- Occupations: Lifestyle coach, Model, Fashion designer, Actress, Radio and Television personality
- Years active: 2009–present
- Children: 4
- Modeling information
- Height: 5 ft 9 in (1.75 m)
- Hair color: Brown
- Eye color: Brown
- Website: www.rosiemercado.com

Rosie Mercado (born March 28, 1980) is an American plus-size model, celebrity makeup artist, fashion designer and television personality of Mexican descent. She is best known for starring in reality television show Curvy Girls on NuvoTV and featuring on National Geographic Channel's Taboo. She has been a special correspondent and life coach on the TV shows The Doctors and Dr. Phil and a co-host on the entertainment talk show Face the Truth.

== Early life ==
Mercado was born in Los Angeles, California and grew up in Riverside, California but she spent most of her life in Las Vegas, Nevada when her parents moved their business there.

Mercado is of Latino descent; her parents are from Mexico in Guadalajara and Zacatecas. Her parents have a business in Las Vegas and she comes from an entrepreneurial background. Mercado credits her father as "a visionary in all the businesses he has created". Mercado's parents have always has been supportive of her in life and her career.

She attended Bishop Gorman High School and left in 1999. She was one of five Latinos who attended the private school. In high school, she was a 'tomboy' and felt that she did not fit in because of her size (which has driven her to promote plus-size diversity in the entertainment industry). She was called "a big girl with a pretty face" or "the girl with the pretty face and the big ass", and was bullied because of her weight. Mercado studied Business Management at University of Nevada, Las Vegas.

Since she was young, Mercado had the desire to make it in the fashion industry, but she had insecurities primarily fueled by her weight issues. She admired Jennifer Lopez and Queen Latifah.

== Modeling career ==
Mercado broke into the fashion industry within four years. She started off in modeling as a photographer; she was trying to build her business but didn't have the money to hire professional models. A celebrity photographer told her that she had a beautiful face and that she should be modeling. She had taken pictures of herself but was often rejected because of her size. Many times fashion industry people liked her face in her portfolio but balked after seeing her in person due to her size, and told her that if she lost weight she would have more work.

== Media career ==
Mercado started working at the age of 15, Mercado was a radio personality in Las Vegas as an early morning host. She went on to work for Telemundo and Univision doing red carpet interviews with high-profile Latino celebrities. She did voiceover work for English and Spanish national and international commercials.

In 2011, Mercado featured on National Geographic Channel's Taboo. She has appeared on National and International Television, From Telemundo and Univision and was a special correspondent with the shows Dr. Phil and The Doctors on CBS. She is considered one of the top 6 influential Latinas to follow by Latina Magazine and Univsion. In 2012 and 2013, she starred in season one and two of NuvoTV's reality television show Curvy Girls which captured the daily life of four plus-size models as they realized their dreams in the fashion world. In June 2013, she was a special guest on The Ricki Lake Show, speaking about plus-size swim fashions. She co-hosted on a talk show produced by Dr. Phil McGraw called Face the Truth on CBS. HarperOne published her memoir, The Girl with Self-Esteem Issues in 2020.

== Makeup and fashion design ==
Mercado turned her makeup skills into a career. She was a celebrity makeup artist who worked in magazines, TV and film. She also took her designing skills and launched her first collection of dresses in 2013 celebrating the beauty of plus size women around the world.

== Weight ==
After letting her weight increase to well over 400 pounds, Mercado managed to start losing weight to deal with mobility issues and embarrassment as she became larger and larger. She was chosen to be the face of Full Figured Fashion Week in 2010 still weighing over 350 pounds. By 2012, she had gotten her weight down to 178 pounds. Though once a size 32/34 at her biggest, she is currently a size 12, and now advocates that it is unhealthy for other women to be overweight. In August 2017 Mercado implied to Us Weekly that she is currently about 160 pounds.

== Personal life ==
Mercado lives in Las Vegas, Nevada and Los Angeles, California. She is a mom of a daughter (born 2000) and two sons (born 2006 and 2007).

In 2013, Mercado graduated from Tony Robbins Mastery University. She promotes body diversity and is a lifestyle coach that inspires women to embrace their authentic beauty and self love and acceptance.
