= Randall Cunningham =

American football player (born 1963)

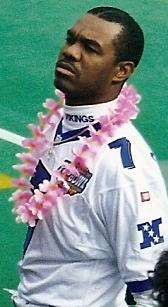
- Cunningham at the 1999 Pro Bowl

No. 12, 7, 1
- Position: Quarterback

Personal information
- Born: March 27, 1963 (age 63); Santa Barbara, California, U.S.
- Listed height: 6 ft 4 in (1.93 m)
- Listed weight: 215 lb (98 kg)

Career information
- High school: Santa Barbara
- College: UNLV (1981–1984)
- NFL draft: 1985: 2nd round, 37th overall pick

Career history
- Philadelphia Eagles (1985–1995); Minnesota Vikings (1997–1999); Dallas Cowboys (2000); Baltimore Ravens (2001)

Awards and highlights
- PFWA NFL Most Valuable Player (1990); UPI NFC Offensive Player of the Year (1990); NFL Comeback Player of the Year (1992); First-team All-Pro (1998); 2× Second-team All-Pro (1988, 1992); 4× Pro Bowl (1988–1990, 1998); Pro Bowl MVP (1988); NFL passer rating leader (1998); Jim Thorpe Trophy (1998); 3× Bert Bell Award (1988, 1990, 1998); Philadelphia Eagles Hall of Fame; 2× First-team All-American (1983, 1984); 2× PCAA Offensive Player of the Year (1983, 1984); 3× First-team All-PCAA (1982–1984); UNLV Rebels No. 12 retired; NFL record: Highest single season Yards Per Carry in NFL history (min. 100 attempts)

Career NFL statistics
- Passing comp-att: 2,429 / 4,229 (56.6%)
- TD–INT: 207–134
- Passing yards: 29,979
- Passer rating: 81.5
- Rushing yards: 4,928
- Rushing touchdowns: 35
- Punts: 20
- Punting yards: 894
- Stats at Pro Football Reference
- College Football Hall of Fame

Randall Wade Cunningham Sr. (born March 27, 1963) is an American former professional football quarterback who played in the National Football League (NFL) for 16 seasons. Cunningham spent the majority of his career with the Philadelphia Eagles and is also known for his Minnesota Vikings tenure. He is fourth in NFL quarterback rushing yards, which he led at the time of his retirement.

Cunningham played college football for the UNLV Rebels, twice earning first-team All-American honors as a punter and winning PCAA Offensive Player of the Year in 1983 and 1984. He was selected in the second round of the 1985 NFL draft by the Eagles, where he spent his first 11 seasons. During his Philadelphia tenure, he led the team to five playoff appearances and one division title while receiving three consecutive Pro Bowl and two second-team All-Pro selections. He retired after the 1995 season, but returned a year later to join the Vikings.

In 1998, Cunningham enjoyed the strongest season of his career and helped the team set the NFL record for the most regular season points scored en route to an NFC Championship Game appearance. He also received a fourth Pro Bowl selection and first-team All-Pro honors. Cunningham lost his starting position during the 1999 season due to a performance decline and was released afterwards. In his final two seasons, he held a backup role with the Dallas Cowboys and Baltimore Ravens. Upon retiring a second and final time, Cunningham became an ordained Protestant minister and served as the team chaplain for the Las Vegas Raiders from 2020 to 2022. He was inducted to the College Football Hall of Fame in 2016.

== Early life and college ==
Cunningham was born in Santa Barbara, California, in 1963. His older brother Sam would also become a future NFL player. He attended Santa Barbara High School, and was a graduate of the class of 1981. As a senior, he led his team to a League title and the CIF Finals. He also competed in track and field at SBHS in the high jump; his elder brother Frank was the state champion in the shot put.

He then went on to attend the University of Nevada, Las Vegas (UNLV). He was a 1983 and 1984 College Football All-America Team selection as a punter. In 1984, his senior year, he led the UNLV Rebels to an 11–2 season—however this was adjusted to 0–13 when it was found out several players were ineligible.

== Professional career ==
=== Philadelphia Eagles ===
Cunningham was the Eagles' second-round pick, and the first quarterback selected in the 1985 NFL draft. Cunningham was also sought by the United States Football League's Tampa Bay Bandits that same year. Eagles owner Norman Braman refused to negotiate with Cunningham if he accepted offers from the Bandits. He wound up choosing the Eagles. In his rookie season he played sparingly as a backup to veteran Ron Jaworski but made a big splash with his uncanny scrambling ability, though he completed just 34 percent of his passes and threw just one touchdown against eight interceptions. In 1986, new head coach Buddy Ryan arrived in Philadelphia and made wholesale changes, many of them unorthodox, mostly due to his defensive-minded philosophy. At the quarterback position, Ryan designated 35-year-old Ron Jaworski the starter but would replace the veteran with the fleet-footed Cunningham in third-and-long situations where the latter's scrambling would presumably put the defense on its heels. After a hand injury to Jaworski in week 10, Cunningham would replace him as the Eagles' starter. Despite his limited service and speed, the Eagles' porous offensive line allowed him to be sacked a franchise record (and NFL record at the time) 72 times that season. Cunningham was permanently handed the Eagles' starting job for the 1987 season. Cunningham was said to have reached "elite" status during the 1988 season, as he was elected by league players as the NFC starting quarterback for the AFC-NFC Pro Bowl (the first black quarterback to ever be elected a starter). That same year, he combined with fellow Eagle Pro Bowler Reggie White to lead the Eagles to the NFC Eastern Division Championship. In the 1988 Divisional Playoffs, Cunningham threw 54 passes for 407 yards during the "Fog Bowl" 20–12 loss against the Chicago Bears, both of which remain playoff franchise records. He also shares the franchise record with 3 interceptions in that same game. (Note: Three interceptions in a single playoff game, record shared with Ron Jaworski and Donovan McNabb (who did it twice).) In the subsequent Pro Bowl a few weeks later, Cunningham was named game MVP as the NFC defeated the AFC, 28–3.

In 1989, on October 2 Cunningham also set the regular season franchise record with 62 pass attempts (now shared with Nick Foles), also against the Chicago Bears. He had been an all-conference quarterback and punter while at UNLV, and unleashed a 91-yard punt against the Giants on December 3, the longest in Eagles history (and the fourth-longest ever). He had 20 punts during his career, with an average of 44.7 yards per punt.

In a 1990 game against the Buffalo Bills, Cunningham, throwing from his end zone, was about to be sacked by Bruce Smith from his blind side. Cunningham ducked and threw a pass 60 yards to wide receiver Fred Barnett, resulting in a 95-yard touchdown. That same year, Cunningham finished with 942 rushing yards, the 2nd most ever for a quarterback at the time (just 26 yards short of the all-time record, set by Bobby Douglass in 1972) and 10th best in the league. He averaged 8.0 yards per rush, the most ever by an Eagle of any position with 100 attempts on the season, and third most in NFL history. (Note: Third to Michael Vick's 8.45 yards/rush in 2006, and Beattie Feathers' 8.44 in 1934. Jim Brown holds the record for rushers with over 200 carries in a season, with 6.40 in 1963.)

In 1991, Cunningham's season came to an abrupt end when he was tackled by Bryce Paup of the Green Bay Packers and tore his anterior cruciate ligament in the first game of the season. He would return to the Eagles completely healed the following season, and led the team to its first playoff victory in 12 years. However, it was evident that the injury he suffered took away much of his speed and athleticism. The 1993 and 1994 seasons would be riddled by a series of nagging injuries and a transition to the West Coast Offense that eventually led to his benching in favor of veteran Rodney Peete. Feeling as if the fans and organization did not fully appreciate his contributions to the team's success, as well as being unhappy with his role as a back-up, Cunningham retired from football after the 1995 season.

He left Philadelphia with the third-most rushing yards in Eagles history (4,482), trailing Hall of Famer Steve Van Buren and Wilbert Montgomery, but has since fallen to sixth after Duce Staley, Brian Westbrook, and LeSean McCoy all surpassed him. He also left second only to Ron Jaworski in passing yards, with 22,877, though both were later surpassed by Donovan McNabb. He still holds the Eagles record with 6.62 yards per rush attempt, 422 sacks taken, and 6.5 yards per pass attempt in playoff games.

=== Minnesota Vikings ===
Cunningham joined the Vikings in 1997 after being out of football in 1996. Vikings' coach Dennis Green called him when he was on a job site for his granite business. There he reunited with former Eagles wide receiver Cris Carter. In his first year with the Vikings, he orchestrated two late scoring drives to bring them back from a 9-point deficit to defeat the New York Giants in an NFC Wild Card game at Giants Stadium, 23–22. However, the Vikings lost in the Divisional Round to Steve Young and the San Francisco 49ers.

Cunningham enjoyed the greatest season of his career in Minnesota during the 1998 campaign when he guided the Vikings to a 15–1 regular season record with 34 touchdown passes, only 10 interceptions, and 3,704 passing yards. Cunningham had a good supporting cast that year with Cris Carter, rookie Randy Moss, and Jake Reed at wide receiver and Robert Smith and Leroy Hoard at running back. Cunningham led the league with a 106.0 passer rating while the Vikings scored a then-NFL record 556 points during the 1998 season, making him the first black quarterback to lead the league in that category. Cunningham claimed the Vikings' Monday night 37–24 victory over the Green Bay Packers was "the greatest night of my football career". He threw for 442 yards and four touchdowns. However, the Vikings ended up being the first 15–1 team to fall short of the Super Bowl, losing to the underdog Atlanta Falcons in the NFC Championship Game by a field goal in overtime.

During the early stages of the 1999 season, after throwing nine interceptions in just six games, Cunningham was benched again, this time in favor of Jeff George. After the team announced that second-year quarterback Daunte Culpepper would be the starter prior to the 2000 season, Cunningham was released.

=== Dallas Cowboys ===
Shortly before the 2000 season, Cunningham signed with the Dallas Cowboys to serve as a backup to Troy Aikman. After a series of concussions ended Aikman's season, and ultimately his career, Cunningham again took the helm at quarterback. Despite posting a 1–2 record as a starter, he put up respectable numbers (849 yards passing with 6 touchdowns and 4 interceptions). One notable occurrence during his time with the Cowboys was a return to Philadelphia. Cunningham started the game and dueled the new Eagles quarterback, Donovan McNabb. The game was decided in overtime, with an Eagles field goal giving them the 16–13 victory. He received a mixed reception of cheers and boos upon his return to Philadelphia. A 5–11 subpar year for the Cowboys led to major roster changes, and Cunningham was one of the many changes. At the end of the season, he reached incentive clauses that voided his contract and made him an unrestricted free agent. He was not re-signed, and the Cowboys signed quarterback Tony Banks instead.

=== Baltimore Ravens ===
On May 29, 2001, he was signed by the Baltimore Ravens, reuniting with head coach Brian Billick, who was his offensive coordinator with the Minnesota Vikings. Cunningham was originally intended to serve as the third-string quarterback, but he was named the backup behind Elvis Grbac after performing better than Chris Redman. He went 2–0 as a starter. He was not re-signed, after the Ravens signed quarterback Jeff Blake instead. On August 15, 2002, Cunningham signed a one-day contract with the Philadelphia Eagles to officially announce his retirement.

In his final 10 NFL seasons, Cunningham played in only 80 games, but finished his 16-year career completing 2,429 of his 4,289 attempts for 29,979 yards and 207 touchdowns, with 134 interceptions. He was sacked 484 times, eleventh-most all time. Cunningham also rushed for 4,928 yards on 775 carries and 35 touchdowns. He retired after the 2001 season as the NFL's all-time leader in rushing yards and carries for the quarterback position, (a record broken in 2011 by Michael Vick), and tied for fourth with Steve Grogan in rushing touchdowns by a quarterback. Cunningham also averaged 30.6 rushing yards per game during his career—second most all-time for quarterbacks, behind Michael Vick.

He has been nominated to the Pro Football Hall of Fame 13 times since becoming eligible.

== NFL career statistics ==
Legend
	NFL record
	Led the league
**Bold**	Career high

=== Regular season ===
Year	Team	Games			Passing								Rushing				Sacks		Fumbles	
Year	Team	GP	GS	Record	Cmp	Att	Pct	Yds	Avg	TD	Int	Rtg	Att	Yds	Avg	TD	Sck	SckY	Fum	Lost
1985	PHI	6	4	1−3	34	81	42.0	548	6.8	1	8	29.8	29	205	7.1	0	20	150	3	1
1986	PHI	15	5	1−3−1	111	209	53.1	1,391	6.7	8	7	72.9	66	540	**8.2**	5	**72**	**489**	7	2
1987	PHI	12	12	7−5	223	406	54.9	2,786	6.9	23	12	83.0	76	505	6.6	3	54	380	12	3
1988	PHI	16	16	10−6	**301**	**560**	53.8	**3,808**	6.8	24	**16**	77.6	93	624	6.7	**6**	57	442	12	2
1989	PHI	16	16	11−5	290	532	54.5	3,400	6.4	21	15	75.5	104	621	6.0	4	45	343	**17**	7
1990	PHI	16	16	10−6	271	465	58.3	3,466	7.5	30	13	91.6	**118**	**942**	8.0	5	49	431	9	0
1991	PHI	1	1	1−0	1	4	25.0	19	4.8	0	0	46.9	0	0	0	0	2	16	0	0
1992	PHI	15	15	10−5	233	384	60.7	2,775	7.2	19	11	87.3	87	549	6.3	5	60	437	13	**8**
1993	PHI	4	4	4−0	76	110	69.1	850	7.7	5	5	88.1	18	110	6.1	1	7	33	3	2
1994	PHI	14	14	7−7	265	490	54.1	3,229	6.6	16	13	74.4	65	288	4.4	3	43	333	10	3
1995	PHI	7	4	1−3	69	121	57.0	605	5.0	3	5	61.5	21	98	4.7	0	13	79	3	2
1997	MIN	6	3	1−2	44	88	50.0	501	5.7	6	4	71.3	19	127	6.7	0	7	60	4	1
1998	MIN	15	14	13−1	259	425	60.9	3,704	**8.7**	**34**	10	**106.0**	32	132	4.1	1	20	132	2	1
1999	MIN	6	6	2−4	124	200	**62.0**	1,475	7.4	8	9	79.1	10	58	5.8	0	15	101	2	2
2000	DAL	6	3	1−2	74	125	59.2	849	6.8	6	4	82.4	23	89	3.9	1	8	45	4	1
2001	BAL	6	2	2−0	54	89	60.7	573	6.4	3	2	81.3	14	40	2.9	1	12	66	4	0
Career		161	135	82−52−1	2,429	4,289	56.6	29,979	7.0	207	134	81.5	775	4,928	6.4	35	484	3,537	105	35

=== Playoffs ===
Year	Team	Games			Passing								Rushing				Sacks		Fumbles	
Year	Team	GP	GS	Record	Cmp	Att	Pct	Yds	Avg	TD	Int	Rtg	Att	Yds	Avg	TD	Sck	SckY	Fum	Lost
1988	PHI	1	1	0−1	27	54	50.0	407	**7.5**	0	**3**	52.0	3	12	4.0	0	4	29	0	0
1989	PHI	1	1	0−1	24	40	60.0	238	6.0	0	1	66.5	6	39	6.5	0	2	27	1	0
1990	PHI	1	1	0−1	15	29	51.7	205	7.1	0	1	60.3	7	**80**	**11.4**	0	5	35	0	0
1992	PHI	2	2	1−1	36	65	55.4	379	5.8	3	0	87.9	7	41	5.9	0	**6**	**51**	2	0
1995	PHI	2	0	—	11	26	42.3	161	6.2	0	1	47.1	5	34	6.8	1	4	27	0	0
1997	MIN	2	2	1−1	33	**76**	43.4	**534**	7.0	4	2	74.1	**9**	52	5.8	0	3	26	**4**	**2**
1998	MIN	2	2	1−1	**46**	75	**61.3**	502	6.7	**5**	1	**97.7**	**9**	19	2.1	1	4	20	3	**2**
1999	MIN	1	0	—	0	0	0.0	0	0.0	0	0	0.0	3	–4	–1.3	0	0	0	0	0
2001	BAL	0	0	did not play																
Career		12	9	3−6	192	365	52.6	2,426	6.6	12	9	74.3	49	273	5.6	2	28	215	10	4

== After retiring ==
After retiring from football, Cunningham returned to UNLV to finish his college degree in Leisure Studies. Cunningham has also been active in the Gospel music business since his retirement from the NFL by opening a recording studio and producing Christian worship music. Cunningham, a born again Christian, became an ordained Protestant minister and founded a church called Remnant Ministries in Las Vegas in 2004. In 2020, Cunningham became the team chaplain for the Las Vegas Raiders, replacing former team chaplain Napoleon Kaufman, who stayed in Oakland when the team moved to Las Vegas.

In December 2009, Cunningham was hired by Silverado High School in Henderson, Nevada as the offensive coordinator of the school's varsity and junior varsity football team. His son, Randall Cunningham II, was a freshman quarterback for the Skyhawks.

On June 29, 2010, one of Cunningham's children, two-year-old son Christian, drowned in a hot tub while unattended at the family home in Las Vegas.

In August 2011, following a rumored spat with Silverado's head coach, Cunningham resigned his coaching position at SHS. His son, Randall Jr, withdrew from SHS and registered the same day at Bishop Gorman High School, a private Roman Catholic school in Las Vegas.

In July 2012, Cunningham was named the 23rd greatest quarterback of the NFL's post-merger era, according to Football Nation.

In March 2013, Cunningham authored Lay It Down: How Letting Go Brings Out Your Best (Worthy Publishing, ISBN 9781617951275). The book shows readers how to work out the “lay it down” principle in all phases of life.

In December 2014, Cunningham was named head coach at Silverado High School. In his rookie season as head coach, he and his staff turned the football program around from a previous record of 3–7 to a 2015 record of 7–4. The team recorded its first playoff victory since the year 2007. He helped coach two National All-Americans who were chosen to participate in the Blue-Grey All-American Bowl games. Cunningham was not retained as coach at Silverado High School after two seasons in April 2017.

Cunningham's #12 Eagles jersey is part of the costume for the Always Teste character of YouTube comedian Ed Bassmaster.

His daughter, Vashti Cunningham, is a track and field athlete who competed in the high jump at the 2020 Summer Olympics, placing sixth overall. His son Randall Cunningham II was a 2-time NCAA Champion, 5-time NCAA Division I All-American, U.S. Junior National Champion, and Pan American Junior Athletics Championships Champion in the high jump.

Cunningham worked with UNLV Cross Country and Track and Field Director Carmelita Jeter at UNLV Rebels from 2023-2025 as a high jump coach after coaching club and professional athletes for a decade. Outside of his record-setting collegiate and professional football career, Cunningham has recently served as coach of high-caliber athletes in the track & field realm. He has coached with the Nevada Gazelles Track Club in Las Vegas and holds coaching experiences at two different Olympic Games and seven different World Championships.

== See also ==
- List of athletes who came out of retirement
- Racial issues faced by black quarterbacks
