= CJIL-DT =

Television station in Lethbridge

- Lethbridge, Alberta; Canada
- Channels: Digital: 17 (UHF); Virtual: 17
- Branding: Miracle Channel

Programming
- Affiliations: Religious Independent; TBN (secondary)

Ownership
- Owner: MCA Media Group; (The Miracle Channel Association)

History
- First air date: January 14, 1996
- Former call signs: CJIL-TV (1996–2011)
- Former channel numbers: Analog: 17 (UHF, 1996–2011)
- Call sign meaning: "Christ Jesus is Lord"

Technical information
- Licensing authority: CRTC
- ERP: 8.6 kW
- HAAT: 133.5 m (438 ft)
- Transmitter coordinates: 49°46′47″N 112°52′18″W
- Translator(s): see § Transmitters

Links
- Website: miraclechannel.ca

CJIL-DT (channel 17) branded Miracle Channel, is a Christian religious television station in Lethbridge, Alberta, Canada, owned by MCA Media Group. The station's studios are located on 31 Street North in Lethbridge, and its transmitter is located on Highway 25 north of the city.

Launched in 1996, CJIL was the first over-the-air religious TV station in Canada. It has been carried on cable and satellite providers in other parts of Canada since 2000.

== History ==
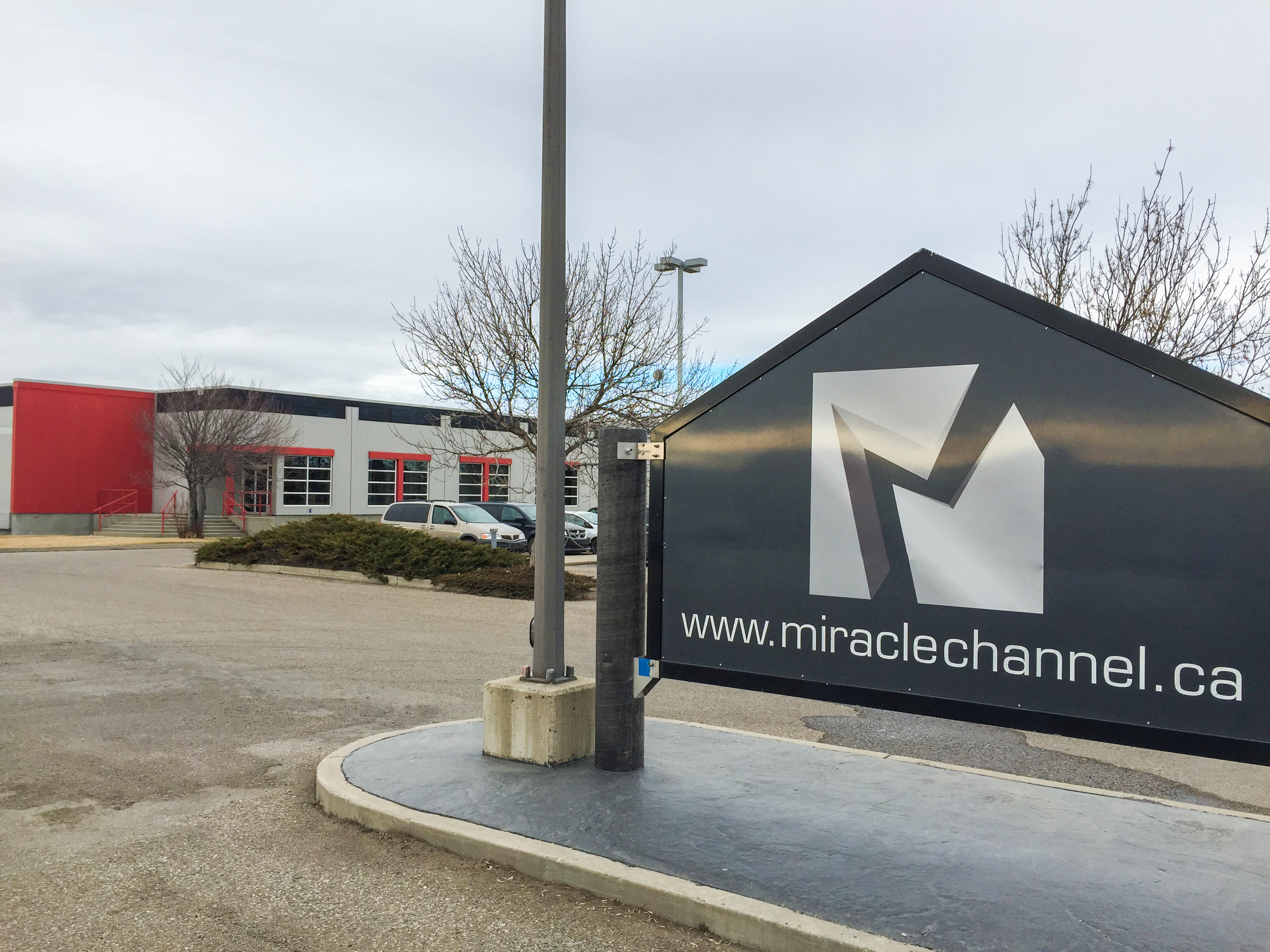
CJIL-DT's offices in Lethbridge

The Canadian Radio-television and Telecommunications Commission (CRTC) granted a broadcasting licence to Dick and Joan Dewert (also known as Dick and Joan Deweert) on April 4, 1995. It debuted on January 14, 1996, broadcasting in southern Alberta, after Canada's 60-year ban on religious broadcasting was lifted. It expanded nationally on September 11, 2000. CJIL was the Canadian partner of the U.S. religious broadcaster Trinity Broadcasting Network (TBN). (The Dewerts had set up an unlicensed relay transmitter for TBN in 1986, which was shut down by the CRTC before CJIL's license was granted.) The station is available globally via satellite and on the Internet.

In 1999 and 2001, two additional transmitters were approved by the CRTC to be added in Bow Island and Burmis.

On May 20, 2007, Dick Dewert admitted to an extramarital affair and resigned from the station. Joan Dewert resigned as well. Mervyn Mediwake was installed as the interim CEO. On January 1, 2010, after a series of interim leaders, the board of directors of the Miracle Channel Association hired Leon Fontaine, senior pastor of the Winnipeg-based Springs Church, as permanent CEO.

On July 8, 2013, TBN announced a partnership with Miracle Channel. As a result, Miracle Channel began airing some of TBN's flagship programs, including Praise the Lord and Behind The Scenes, while TBN's networks picked up some of Miracle Channel's programs, including Springs Church services, and The Leon Show on The Church Channel. Plans were also announced for Fontaine to be a regular host on Praise the Lord, and for four episodes per year to originate from Canada. The two networks also announced plans to co-produce a new weekly program. The move came weeks following Daystar's announcement of a similar program supply deal with Grace TV, which would soon be rebranded Daystar Canada.

On September 19, 2017, the channel premiered a daily newscast, Bridge City News, hosted by Hal Roberts.

In 2024, MCA received approval for a new discretionary specialty channel known as Corco, dedicated primarily to family-oriented programming and a limited amount of religious content. In February 2025, it relaunched as a Canadian version of Merit TV as part of an agreement with Phil McGraw's Merit Street Media.

== Over-the-air in Alberta ==
In 2007, The Miracle Channel Association filed an application with the CRTC for a licence to operate English-language transitional digital television programming undertakings in Calgary (Channel 15) and Edmonton (Channel 21). If approved, these transmitters would have simply rebroadcast CJIL in its entirety. The applications were denied, however, in favour of a competing application from the Crossroads Television System.

As part of spectrum re-allocation, full-power over-the-air transmitters on channels 52–69 must vacate those channels, but may move to a channel below 52. CJIL's transmitter in Burmis, CJIL-TV-2 channel 55, was affected by this change. In filings to the CRTC, CJIL has stated that it plans on shutting down this transmitter.

== Criticism ==
The Miracle Channel Review, a Christian-run website unaffiliated with the network, has been critical of the Dewerts and other personalities over the prosperity gospel message they have preached during CJIL's fundraising telethons. The Miracle Channel Review's webmaster, Tim Thibault, issued formal complaints with the CRTC over improper statements made during CJIL's telethons; the CRTC ruled in 2006 that the fundraising cited by Thibault violated federal guidelines.

== Transmitters ==
Station	City of licence	Channel	ERP	HAAT	Transmitter Coordinates
CJIL-TV-1	Bow Island	39 (UHF)	13.86 kW	112 m	49°47′8″N 111°19′29″W

On March 30, 1999, the CRTC approved to add a new TV transmitter at Bow Island on channel 39.

On August 30, 2001, the CRTC approved to add a new TV transmitter at Burmis on channel 55.
