= Sam Cunningham =

American football player (1950–2021)

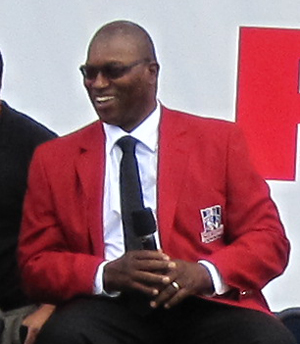
- Cunningham at his 2010 induction to the Patriots Hall of Fame

No. 39
- Position: Fullback

Personal information
- Born: August 15, 1950; Santa Barbara, California, U.S.
- Died: September 7, 2021 (aged 71); Inglewood, California, U.S.
- Listed height: 6 ft 3 in (1.91 m)
- Listed weight: 226 lb (103 kg)

Career information
- High school: Santa Barbara
- College: USC (1969–1972)
- NFL draft: 1973: 1st round, 11th overall pick

Career history
- New England Patriots (1973–1982)

Awards and highlights
- Pro Bowl (1978); New England Patriots All-1970s Team; New England Patriots 35th Anniversary Team; New England Patriots 50th Anniversary Team; New England Patriots Hall of Fame; National champion (1972); First-team All-American (1972)

Career NFL statistics
- Rushing yards: 5,453
- Rushing average: 3.9
- Rushing touchdowns: 43
- Receptions: 210
- Receiving yards: 1,905
- Receiving touchdowns: 6
- Stats at Pro Football Reference
- College Football Hall of Fame

Samuel Lewis Cunningham Jr (August 15, 1950 – September 7, 2021), nicknamed "Bam", was an American professional football fullback who played in the National Football League (NFL) for nine seasons with the New England Patriots. He played college football for the USC Trojans, where he earned first-team All-American honors and was the Most Valuable Player of the 1973 Rose Bowl. He was inducted to the College Football Hall of Fame in 2010. Before that, Cunningham was a high school All-American at Santa Barbara High School, playing both fullback and linebacker; and was a high school state champion in the shot put.

Selected in the first round of the 1973 NFL draft by the Patriots, Cunningham became the franchise's all-time leading rusher. He led the Patriots in rushing five consecutive seasons. In 2010, he was inducted to the Patriots Hall of Fame. Cunningham was selected as a member of the 35th and 50th Anniversary Patriots All-Time Teams. At every level as a player, he was highly regarded for the quality of his character as a person and teammate.

== Early life ==
Cunningham was born on August 15, 1950, in Santa Barbara, California to Samuel Sr. and Zoe (Ivory) Cunningham. His father was a railroad worker, and his mother died when Cunningham was young. He was later raised by his father and stepmother Mabel (Crook) Cunningham, who was a nurse. Cunningham had three younger brothers, including future NFL star Randall Cunningham.

Cunningham attended Santa Barbara High School, graduating in 1969. Wearing No. 34 for the Dons, he scored 39 touchdowns as a fullback, while also playing linebacker, during his high school career.

Cunningham was second-team All-Channel League as a sophomore (1966) and first-team All-Channel League as a junior fullback (1967). In 1967, he was also named All-California Interscholastic Federation (CIF) at linebacker. As a senior (1968), the 6 ft 3 in (1.91 m) 220 lb (99.8 kg) Cunningham led the Channel League in rushing with 1,097 yards and 20 touchdowns; and was named the league's co-player of the year. He was first-team All-Channel League again, at fullback; while also playing linebacker that season. He was again first-team All-CIF in 1968. Parade named Cunningham a second-team High School All-American in 1968. He was named to Scholastic Magazine's All-American High School Football Team at linebacker.

Cunningham was also a member of Santa Barbara High School's track and field team. He was the CIF, Southern Section, shot put champion as a junior and senior, and was the state shot put champion in his senior year. He was the Channel League champion as a senior in the 100-yard and 220-yard dashes, as well as the shot put. Cunningham was named All-CIF in track in 1968 and 1969 for the shot put.

Cunningham was also known in high school for genuineness, honesty, and decency as a human being. He once had a 4 ft 10 in (1.47 m) teammate who was being mercilessly bullied, until Cunningham announced to the team that the bullies would have to go through Cunningham first if they wanted to go after his teammate, an event that changed the smaller teenaged boy's life.

== College career ==
Cunningham was recruited to the University of Southern California (USC) by future College Football Hall of Fame coach John McKay. Cunningham principally played fullback at USC, and became well known for leaping over the top of his offensive line, launching himself over the pile of offensive and defensive linemen as they collided during the play, and then landing in the end zone for touchdowns. His nickname "Bam" reportedly came from these goal line dives. USC teammate Lynn Swann said this was a significant reason that McKay played Cunningham principally at fullback instead of tailback. In addition, Cunningham was an excellent blocker at fullback. Los Angeles Times' award-winning sportswriter Jim Murray admiringly observed in 1972 that Cunningham was a top tier rusher, but at USC was used at fullback in his senior year because of his superior blocking ability; a task he performed enthusiastically and without complaint to the benefit of the team.

USC's track coach Vern Wolfe considered Cunningham to be the fastest sprinter over the first 10 yards of any sprinter he had ever coached, including O. J. Simpson and Earl McCullough. Cunningham had competed in the decathlon as a sophomore at USC. McKay reportedly later said that he had underutilized Cunningham's speed as a running back at USC. While Cunningham only played running back at USC, McKay said in 1971 that "'Cunningham, when he came to us, was as good a linebacker as I've ever seen anywhere'".

Cunningham was a letterman for the University of Southern California's football team from 1970 through 1972, wearing jersey No. 39. As a sophomore (1970) Cunnigham rushed for 488 yards and five touchdowns, and had 16 receptions for 167 yards and two receiving touchdowns. He led the Pacific-8 Conference in yards per carry (6.4). As a junior (1971), Cunningham had 742 yards on 159 carries with five rushing touchdowns. He played both fullback and tailback that season; and missed the season's last two games because of knee surgery. He began the 1971 slowly, being tackled too easily and having difficulty with fumbles. McKay told Cunningham "'If you're going to be a great runner, you have to start punishing tacklers'". In the next game after receiving this advice from McKay, Cunningham rushed for 187 yards against the Oregon Ducks, including a 65-yard touchdown run; but still had a costly fumble.

As a senior (1972), he was considered one of the best blocking fullbacks in college football, playing in a backfield with running backs Anthony Davis and Rod McNeill, and quarterback Mike Rae. Cunningham had 91 carries for a college career low 311 yards, but rushed for nine touchdowns. Cunningham was named an All-American in 1972, and was a captain of USC's 1972 12–0 national championship team. The Newspaper Enterprise Association (NEA) named him a first-team All-American, and United Press International recognized Cunningham as an honorable mention for All-American. Cunningham was also an honorable mention All-Pacific-8 in the coaches' poll.

Cunningham scored four rushing touchdowns in the 1973 Rose Bowl in USC's victory over the Ohio State Buckeyes, 42–17. All of his touchdown runs were from within the two-yard line, and all were in the second half. He leaped over the offensive line for all four touchdowns that day. Cunningham was named Player of the Game. Cunningham's four touchdowns are still the modern-day Rose Bowl record. He was inducted into the Rose Bowl Hall of Fame in 1992, the USC Athletics Hall of Fame in 2001, and into the College Football Hall of Fame in 2010. The 1972 USC team included four other College Hall of Fame players, Anthony Davis, Lynn Swann (also in the NFL Hall of Fame), Richard Wood, and Charles Young, and is considered one of the all-time great college teams.

Over three years at USC, Cunningham rushed for 1,541 yards, averaging 4.7 yards per attempt, and scoring 19 touchdowns. He had another two touchdowns on 34 pass receptions, while totaling 301 receiving yards. Cunningham played in the 1973 Hula Bowl, College All-Star Game, and Coaches All-America Game.

1970 game between USC and Alabama

As a sophomore in 1970, Cunningham was part of USC's "all-black" backfield – the first one of its kind in Division I (NCAA) history – that included quarterback Jimmy Jones and running back Clarence Davis. His debut game as a USC player came on September 12, 1970 against an all-white University of Alabama football team. Cunningham had 135 yards on only 12 carries, scoring the game's first two touchdowns (including a 22-yard touchdown run), as USC beat Alabama, 42–21, in Birmingham.

Cunningham's performance in the game was reportedly a factor in convincing the University of Alabama and its fans to allow head coach Bear Bryant to integrate Alabama's football team, which Bryant wanted to do. Bryant's assistant coach and protege Jerry Claiborne has been quoted (with some minor variations) as saying at the time that "Sam Cunningham did more to integrate Alabama in 60 minutes than Martin Luther King had accomplished in 20 years". Cunningham himself later considered the game a "'tipping point'" in bringing civil rights to sports, and Alabama coach Bryant conceded to Grambling State University coach Eddie Robinson the effect of Cunningham's performance on the need to integrate at Alabama. Bryant had already included at least one black player on Alabama's freshman team going into 1970, but the effect of the game gave Bryant latitude in recruiting and playing black players moving into the future.

Years later Cunningham was in a golf tournament with Bryant in Birmingham, and Bryant complimented Cunningham on his play during the 1970 game. Bryant told Cunningham how the racial makeup of Alabama's football team changed significantly in just a few years after that game. Alabama guard, and Cunningham's future nine-year NFL teammate, John Hannah played against Cunningham in the 1970 USC win over Alabama. Hannah later said as to the game itself, "'It felt like he had 800 yards that night . . . it was awful'". Hannah more broadly observed about Cunningham's performance in that game, "'I've always said, Martin Luther King Jr. legalized integration in Alabama, and Sam made Alabamians want integration'".

In 2006, Cunningham co-authored the book Turning of the Tide, with writer Don Yaeger and Cunningham's 1970 USC teammate John Papadakis, about the 1970 USC-Alabama game's historical impact.

== Professional career ==
Cunningham was drafted by the New England Patriots in the first round of the 1973 NFL draft, 11th overall. The Patriots also selected Alabama guard, and future Hall of Famer, John Hannah with the fourth pick in the same draft, who would block for Cunningham as the Patriots' left guard during Cunningham's entire Patriots career. Cunningham played his entire NFL career (1973 to 1979, 1981 to 1982) with the Patriots and was a 1978 Pro Bowl selection.

Cunningham was slowed by a knee injury early in his rookie season (1973), but came on as the season progressed to rush for 516 yards as a rookie, a then record for Patriots rookies. The Patriots were 5–9 that season. In 1974, Cunningham gained 811 yards and had nine touchdowns in 10 games. He helped lead the Patriots to a surprising 5–0 start before the team faltered to a 7–7 finish. Going into that season's 10th game against the New York Jets, the Patriots were 6–3, but would only win one more game. Cunningham suffered an injury in the third quarter of that game against the Jets, after gaining 113 yards; and he did not play in the season's final four games. Cunningham's 4.9 yards per carry was third best in the NFL that season.

In 1975, he started 13 games, with a team-leading 666 rushing yards and six rushing touchdowns; along with 32 receptions for 253 yards and two touchdowns. In 1976, he rushed for a team-leading 824 yards in only 11 games, averaging 4.8 yards per carry (fifth best in the NFL); with 299 receiving yards. Cunningham suffered a shoulder injury early in the season's 10th game, and carried the ball only twice. He missed the next three games and only had six rushing attempts in the last game of the 1976 regular season. The Patriots were 11–3 that season, and reached the playoffs. They lost in the first round of the 1976-77 NFL playoffs to the eventual Super Bowl champion Oakland Raiders, 24–21. Cunningham had 20 rushing attempts, and led all rushers in that playoff game with 68 yards.

In 1977, he led the Patriots in rushing for a career-high 1,015 yards on a career-high 270 carries; and scored four rushing touchdowns. He also had 42 receptions for 370 yards and a receiving touchdown. This was the only season of his nine-year NFL career in which Cunningham played in every game. He was seventh in the NFL in yards from scrimmage that season.

In 1978, he led the Patriots in rushing for a fourth consecutive season, with 768 yards on 199 carries and eight rushing touchdowns; along with 297 yards on 31 receptions. This was his only Pro Bowl season. Cunningham was an integral part of that 1978 Patriots' team that set an NFL team rushing record with 3,165 yards. This record stood for more than forty years and was not broken until the 2019 Baltimore Ravens had 3,172 yards. The team was 11–5, but lost to the Houston Oilers in the first round of the 1978–79 NFL playoffs; with Cunningham leading the Patriots in rushing yards for that game.

In 1979, for a fifth consecutive season Cunningham led the Patriots in rushing yards (563), and tied for the team lead in rushing touchdowns (five). He also had 29 receptions for 236 yards. This was his last fulltime season with the Patriots. Cunningham did not play in 1980 because of a contract dispute with the Patriots, who traded him to the Miami Dolphins. After failing a physical examination, he returned to the Patriots before the 1981 season started. He started only eight games, with 269 yards on 86 carries that season; having never started less than 10 games with 155 carries for the Patriots before that season. In 1982, Cunningham appeared in only six games with nine rushing attempts, after suffering a knee injury in the preseason and not being activated to play until late November 1982. The Patriots did not tender Cunningham a new contract for the 1983 season.

Cunningham finished his career with 5,453 rushing yards, 210 receptions for 1,905 yards, and 49 touchdowns. He remains the all-time Patriots rushing leader (through 2025–26). He is second in team history in rushing touchdowns (43), and fifth in scoring among non-kickers, with all four of those players ahead of him being pass receivers.

== Legacy and honors ==
Cunningham was inducted into the Rose Bowl Hall of Fame in 1992, the USC Athletics Hall of Fame in 2001, and into the College Football Hall of Fame in 2010. Cunningham also was the 2010 inductee to the Patriots Hall of Fame. He was selected as a member of the 35th and 50th Anniversary Patriots All-Time Teams.

Patriots' owner Robert Kraft said of Cunningham, "'As much as I admired him as a player, my affection for him only grew after spending time with him and learning more about him as a person. He made a tremendous impact, both on and off the field, and was beloved by his teammates'". Santa Barbara sportswriter John Zant, who had covered Cunningham starting in high school, said at the time of Cunningham's death in 2021 "The qualities that set Sam Cunningham apart and made him the brightest star in the constellation of sports figures during my lifetime were his genuineness, his honesty, and his decency". His Los Angeles Times’ obituary stated in 2021 “If fans knew him as the runner who launched himself fearlessly over the pile, landing with a thud in the endzone, teammates recalled a sociable and humble guy, someone who always told the truth”.

== NFL career statistics ==
Legend
	Led the league
**Bold**	Career high

Year	Team	Games		Rushing						Receiving					Fumbles	
Year	Team	GP	GS	Att	Yds	Avg	Y/G	Lng	TD	Rec	Yds	Avg	Lng	TD	Fum	FR
1973	NE	14	10	155	516	3.3	36.9	25	4	15	144	9.6	34	1	10	**2**
1974	NE	10	10	166	811	**4.9**	**81.1**	**75**	**9**	22	214	9.7	37	**2**	2	0
1975	NE	13	13	169	666	3.9	51.2	17	6	32	253	7.9	24	**2**	**12**	**2**
1976	NE	11	11	172	824	4.8	74.9	24	3	27	299	**11.1**	**41**	0	5	1
1977	NE	14	**14**	**270**	**1,015**	3.8	72.5	31	4	**42**	**370**	8.8	35	1	10	**2**
1978	NE	**16**	**14**	199	768	3.9	48.0	52	8	31	297	9.6	31	0	4	0
1979	NE	12	12	159	563	3.5	46.9	27	5	29	236	8.1	20	0	4	0
1980	NE	Missed season due to contract dispute														
1981	NE	11	8	86	269	3.1	24.5	12	4	12	92	7.7	12	0	2	0
1982	NE	6	2	9	21	2.3	3.5	4	0	–	–	–	–	–	–	–
Career		107	94	1,385	5,453	3.9	51.0	75	43	210	1,905	9.1	41	6	49	7

== Personal life ==
After retirement, Cunningham moved to Inglewood, California with his wife Cine, and they raised a daughter, Samahndi. He had a landscaping business after retiring from football.

He was the older brother (by over 12 years) of former University of Nevada, Las Vegas and NFL quarterback Randall Cunningham; and the uncle of Randall Cunningham II and world champion high jumper Vashti Cunningham. His brother Randall had been a champion high jumper in high school at Santa Barbara. His nephew Randall Cunningham II was a two time high jump champion at USC, and his niece Vashti Cunningham is an international, medal winning, high jump competitor. Sam and Randall Cunningham are among eight sets of brothers selected to College Football Hall of Fame.

== Death ==
Cunningham died on September 7, 2021, at the age of 71.
