= Merit TV =

American television network

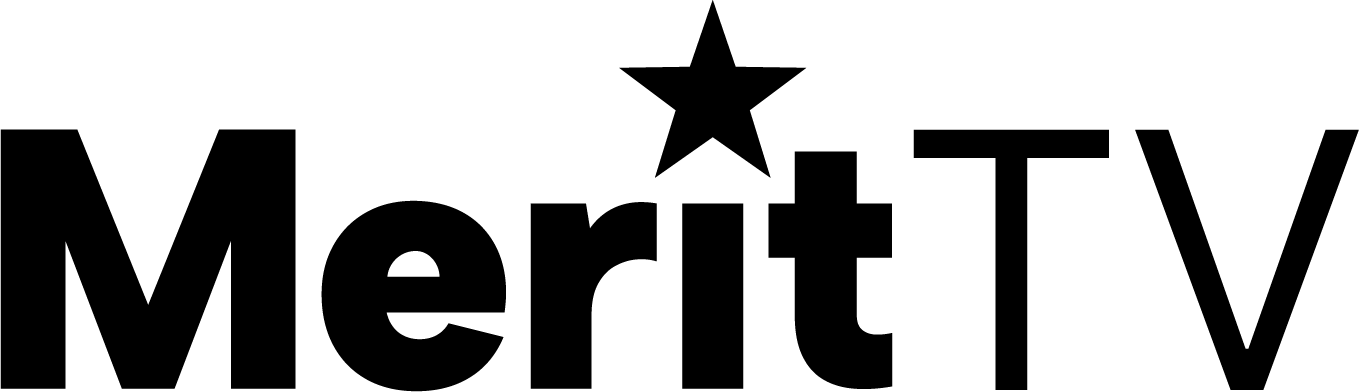
- Type: Digital multicast television network
- Country: United States
- Broadcast area: Nationwide, via OTA digital TV (coverage 7.48%)
- Headquarters: Fort Worth, Texas

Programming
- Language: English
- Picture format: HDTV (720p)

Ownership
- Owner: Trinity Broadcasting Network; Peteski Productions; (Merit Street Media)

History
- Launched: April 2, 2024
- Closed: March 21, 2026 (over-the-air)
- Former names: Merit Street (April–September 2024)

Links
- Website: meritstreetmedia.com

Merit TV (formerly Merit Street) was an American digital multicast television network and streaming service owned by Merit Street Media, a Fort Worth, Texas-based company founded by Phil McGraw as a joint venture between the Trinity Broadcasting Network (TBN) and McGraw's Peteski Productions, with comedian and television host Steve Harvey also holding an equity stake.

At launch, the channel primarily carried news and discussion programming featuring conservative commentary (including Dr. Phil Primetime), true crime programming, and reruns of McGraw and Harvey's former syndicated talk shows Dr. Phil, Steve Harvey, and Steve.

In July 2025, amid low viewership, Merit Street Media filed for bankruptcy and filed a lawsuit against TBN, accusing it of breach of contract and using its ownership stake to enrich itself at Merit Street's expense. At this time, Merit TV suspended its production of original programming, with its schedule consisting solely of reruns.

The channel was available through digital over-the-air television, Samsung TV Plus, and cable and satellite television services.

== History ==
=== Launch ===
Phil McGraw had previously hosted the syndicated talk show Dr. Phil with Oprah Winfrey's Harpo Productions and CBS Media Ventures. The program run for 21 seasons until ending in 2023.

In November 2023, McGraw announced a new Fort Worth, Texas-based production company known as Merit Street Media, and a television venture of the same name that planned to launch in February 2024; McGraw explained that its name was derived from the concept of meritocracy, and "Main Street America". The network would operate an accompanying streaming service known as Merit+. Its original programming was slated to feature a continuation of his talk show known as Dr. Phil Primetime; McGraw explained that "I absolutely love talking to real people about real problems — people who aren't just complaining but are actively looking for real solutions to better their lives", and spoke of "American families and our core values" being "under attack". These remarks led media outlets to suggest that Merit Street's content would have a larger focus on McGraw's conservative views.

McGraw named Joel Cheatwood, an executive known for pioneering a popular and heavily imitated tabloid news format at WSVN, developing Glenn Beck's talk show for Fox News and overseeing Beck's GBTV/TheBlaze at its inception, as Merit's first chief operating officer. A number of staff members from the Dr. Phil show relocated to Texas to join the then-upcoming network. The following month, McGraw announced plans for distribution via linear television and streaming platforms, and that he had "commitments already exceeding 65 million television homes".

Among these distribution agreements was a partnership with religious broadcaster Trinity Broadcasting Network (TBN); despite the TBN agreement, McGraw stated that Merit Street's programming would not be faith-based. The TBN partnership gave the broadcaster a controlling equity stake in Merit Street Media, in exchange for a commitment to provide national distribution and access to production resources for its programming.

In February 2024, Nancy Grace joined the network to host a true crime program. In March 2024, Steve Harvey acquired an equity stake in the network, with plans to develop talent and programming for Merit Street. Chris Harrison also joined the network under an overall deal, with plans to produce a show with his wife Lauren Zima, and create and host a reality dating show.

First logo, used until September 2024

Merit Street launched on April 2, 2024. In August 2024, Merit Street Media fired approximately 40 employees, representing 30% of its workforce, as part of "ongoing consolidations of departments and roles". Largely attributed to Texas being a right-to-work state, many of the employees were fired without a reason or severance package. Cheatwood announced the network's producers and support staff would collaborate for future programming. In September 2024, Merit Street quietly rebranded as Merit TV.

Former Tennis Channel CEO Ken Solomon served on the board of Merit Street Media as an advisor; in September 2024, it was reported that he had been fired from Tennis Channel by its owner Sinclair Broadcast Group, deeming that his involvement in Merit Street had become a "growing distraction".

In February 2025, Merit Street Media announced a partnership with Miracle Channel owners MCA Media Group to launch a Canadian version of the channel titled Merit TV Canada.

=== Bankruptcy ===
On July 2, 2025, Merit Street Media filed for Chapter 11 bankruptcy protection; the company listed assets and liabilities between $100 million and $500 million. It also filed a lawsuit against TBN for breach of contract, accusing the broadcaster of "failing to provide clearly agreed-upon national distribution and other significant foundational commitments", and "[abusing] its power as a controlling shareholder to advance its own interests and those of its CEO Matthew Crouch, while causing Merit Street to assume responsibility of TBN's obligations under the Joint Venture Agreement, and to otherwise enrich itself at Merit Street's expense." At this time, Merit TV suspended the production of first-run programming, with reruns of existing series continuing to air on the channel. The network had also failed to gain traction in viewership, with its average prime time audience falling to around 27,000 viewers in 2024, and falling to only 17,000 by the second quarter of 2025. By the end of 2025, according to Variety, Merit TV had a slightly low prime time audience of just 16,000 viewers, landing it among the bottom 15 least-watched television networks in the country, at number 140 out of 153, based on the latest numbers from Nielsen, just above Paramount Skydance's Logo TV and behind Urban One's Cleo TV.

On July 14, 2025, McGraw announced that he would form another new Dallas-based venture known as Envoy Media, which would focus on "delivering live, balanced news, original entertainment programming and immersive viewer experiences through both traditional and emerging technologies"; it was also stated to feature content from himself and Steve Harvey, as well as citizen journalism features.

On October 28, 2025, a bankruptcy judge ordered McGraw to convert the company's case to a Chapter 7 liquidation after claiming that creditors would agree if the company's assets were sold via an independent trustee.

On or around March 21, 2026, the network quietly ceased over-the-air distribution, with TBN-owned television stations that carried the network later replacing it with an infomercial channel known as TV Deals in mid-April after temporarily showing a black screen.

== Programming ==
McGraw stated that Merit Street would focus on news and true crime programming. At launch, the channel's original news programming included the morning show Morning on Merit Street, The News on Merit Street, and flagship Dr. Phil Primetime, a continuation of McGraw's syndicated talk show. Nancy Grace hosted the true crime series Crime Stories with Nancy Grace, and her YouTube series The Behavior Panel was also acquired by the channel.

Its news programs featured conservative commentary; Dr. Phil Primetime in particular would feature right-wing figures such as Jordan Peterson and then-presidential candidates Robert F. Kennedy Jr. and Donald Trump as guests, and segments featuring McGraw embedded with Immigration and Customs Enforcement (ICE) officers during a June 2025 protest in Los Angeles.

Merit TV also carried repackaged reruns of Dr. Phil (such as Dr. Phil: True Crime), Cops and Jail, and reruns of Steve Harvey's syndicated talk shows Steve Harvey (2012–2017) and Steve (2017–2019). In February 2025, Merit Street announced that it had acquired the syndication rights to all seasons of Dr. Phil from CBS Media Ventures, with reruns being discontinued from the syndication market in the 2025–26 television season, and plans for some episodes to be updated with new content.

In August 2024, Merit Street acquired the rights to the ACM Honors, as part of a collaboration with the Academy of Country Music (ACM) on country music-oriented programming.

In May 2024, Merit Street acquired rights to Professional Bull Riders (PBR) events under a four-year agreement beginning in July 2024, including Unleash the Beast Series and PBR Team Series events not televised by CBS Sports (largely replacing the package previously held by CBS Sports Network). The coverage also included a studio show, PBR Now. Merit Street stated that it would carry a total of 300 hours of PBR-related programming per-year. PBR programming accounted for a major share of Merit Street's audience, with the company stating that it had attracted 2.4 million unique viewers to the channel, and 31% of its total viewer base. However, on November 14, 2024, PBR announced that it had terminated the contract (moving the coverage to the PBR apps, YouTube channel, and Pluto TV) amid disputes with the network, which had withheld rights fees. Merit Street Media stated that it had "agreed to work out its differences with PBR in a confidential proceeding which is ongoing", and was "astonished" by the decision to pull its programming.

== International ==
In January 2025, MCA Media Group, an affiliate of Canadian religious broadcaster Miracle Channel, announced that it would launch Merit TV Canada as a specialty channel. It replaced MCA's Corco TV, which launched in 2021, and offers the former channel's reality programming alongside a variety of shows produced for the U.S. network. Miracle Channel has an affiliation with one of Merit Street's partners, TBN.

== See also ==
- Oprah Winfrey Network
