= Mary Chrzanowski =

American retired judge and lawyer

- Born: United States
- Other name: Scary Mary
- Occupations: Judge, television personality, lawyer
- Known for: Face the Truth

Mary Chrzanowski (known as Scary Mary during her time as a Macomb County, Michigan Circuit Judge) is a retired American judge, lawyer and a former co-host on the television series Face the Truth.

In 1992, she was elected as a Macomb County Cicruit Judge where she served 24 years and then retired to take an appointed administrative law judgeship with the United States federal government.

In 2020, Chrzanowski defeated Jodi Switalski in the Democratic primary for Prosecuting Attorney of Macomb County, Michigan. Republican candidate Peter Lucido ultimately won the 2020 race for Macomb Prosecuting Attorney.

Chrzanowski appeared in a 2014 episode of Dateline NBC and has been featured on such television series as Dr. Phil, The Doctors and Face the Truth.
