= Randall Cunningham II =

American football player, high jumper (born 1996)

Randall Cunningham
Personal information
- Born: January 4, 1996 (age 30) Las Vegas, Nevada, U.S.
- Height: 6 ft 6 in (198 cm)
- Weight: 180 lb (82 kg; 12 st 12 lb)

Sport
- Sport: Track and field
- Position: High jump
- College team: USC Trojans
Medal record
Men's athletics
Representing United States
Pan American Junior Championships
Gold medal – first place	2015 Edmonton	High jump
Representing USC Trojans/Pac-12
By event
Event	1st	2nd	3rd
NCAA Outdoor Championships	1	0	0
NCAA Indoor Championships	1	0	0
Total	2	0	0
By race
Event	1st	2nd	3rd
outdoor high jump	1	0	0
indoor high jump	1	0	0
Total	2	0	0
NCAA Outdoor Championships
Gold medal – first place	2016 Eugene	high jump
NCAA Indoor Championships
Gold medal – first place	2018 College Station	high jump

Randall Wade Cunningham II (born January 4, 1996) is an American former high jumper. He competed collegiately for the USC Trojans Men's track & field team. A dual-sport athlete, he also played quarterback at Bishop Gorman High School. He is a five-time Nevada Interscholastic Activities Association (NIAA) state champion (three times in track and twice in football). He is a 2-time NCAA Track Champion, and 4-time NCAA All-American, U.S. Junior National Champion, and Pan American Junior Athletics Championships Champion.

In track, he set USA Track & Field (USATF) and Amateur Athletic Union (AAU) national 15–16-year-old boys high jump records with a heights of 2.16 metres (7 ft 1.0 in) and 7 feet 2 inches (2.18 m), respectively, as a sophomore. As a junior, he posted the highest jump of the year by an American high school student in Spring 2013 with a height of 7 feet 3.25 inches (2.22 m). He was the 2013 Nevada Track & Field Gatorade Athlete of the Year. He won the NIAA state high jump championship as a freshman, as a junior and as a senior.

In football, he led Gorman to its fifth consecutive Nevada Interscholastic Activities Association (NIAA) state championship in 2013 and declined numerous Division I Football Bowl Subdivision (FBS) scholarship offers as well as an offer to play football at Yale University. He is the son of retired National Football League quarterback Randall Cunningham, nephew of retired NFL fullback Sam Cunningham and older brother of World Champion Vashti Cunningham.

During his freshman year at USC, he became an All-American by placing 8th in the year-end National Collegiate Athletic Association (NCAA) outdoor championships. During the subsequent summer he became the U.S. Junior National high jump Champion and won a gold medal at the 2015 Pan American Junior Athletics Championships. He won the 2016 NCAA outdoor championships as a sophomore and was an All-American as a junior. He won the NCAA indoor championship as a senior.

== Career ==
=== Football ===
Cunningham attended Silverado High School in Las Vegas for his freshman season. His father, who had previously coached his youth teams, was hired as the football team's offensive coordinator and for the track team's staff in December 2009. In August 2011, his father resigned his positions and transferred his son to Bishop Gorman just prior to his sophomore year.

Due to NIAA rules which require a transfer student to wait a year before participating in athletic activities, Randall II was required to sit out his sophomore year in both football and track and field at Bishop Gorman. Then, he backed up four-time state champion starting quarterback Anu Solomon as a junior. That season, he compiled 298 yards and two touchdowns on 21–32 passing with four interceptions and added 42 rushes for 483 yards and seven touchdowns. By his junior year, his 40-yard dash speed was laser-timed at 4.6 seconds. As a senior, he inherited a team that Solomon had led to four consecutive state championships. Despite not starting until his senior season, he entered the year with football scholarship offers from Mississippi State, LSU, Baylor, Syracuse, Arizona State, Utah and UNLV. USA Today predicted that Baylor and LSU may be favorites because of their strong track programs.

During his senior season, the team played a schedule of out-of-state schools for its first 6 games before beginning league competition. Bishop Gorman won 4 of those games. Its October 4 contest with Miami's Booker T. Washington High School was broadcast on ESPNU at a time when Washington was the number one ranked high school in the country. By that time, he had added offers from Kansas State and Yale. In the five previous seasons under head coach Tony Sanchez, Bishop Gorman had gone 60–5 and not lost by more than 14 points. Bishop Gorman entered the game with national rankings of 18 by Rivals.com, 32 by Student Sports. Gorman trailed 14–12 with 8:35 remaining when Cunningham fumbled. Washington scored a touchdown and then another following Cunningham's third interception, resulting in a 28–12 defeat. Subsequently, Cunningham led Gorman through an undefeated Southwest League regular season, marking the seventh consecutive such occurrence for the school. By mid-November, Cunningham stated "I like USC, UCLA, Kansas State, Texas, ASU, and Indiana - and Oregon as well". On December 7, he led Gorman to a 48–14 victory over Edward C. Reed High School in the state championship, rushing for 4 touchdowns and 213 yards on 22 carries and throwing for a touchdown and 111 yards on 9-of-11 passing. Cunningham was briefly recruited by Clay Helton, USC quarterback coach under Steve Sarkisian, but USC did not make him a football scholarship offer. After accepting a track scholarship to USC, Cunningham announced he would attempt to walk-on to the football team.

College recruiting
Name	Hometown	School	Height	Weight	40^{‡}	Commit date
Randall Cunningham II; QB / WR	Las Vegas, Nevada	Bishop Gorman (NV)	6 ft 6 in (1.98 m)	180 lb (82 kg)	4.4	
Randall Cunningham II; QB / WR	Recruit ratings: Scout: Rivals: (77)					
Overall recruit ranking: Scout: 134 WR Rivals: No rating (QB, dual-threat) ESPN: 25 (QB, dual-threat), 2 (NV)
Note: In many cases, Scout, Rivals, 247Sports, On3, and ESPN may conflict in their listings of height and weight.; In these cases, the average was taken. ESPN grades are on a 100-point scale.; Sources:

=== Track ===
On August 1, 2010, Cunningham placed second in the 13–14 age group at the USATF National Junior Olympics with a high jump of 5 feet 8.75 inches (1.75 m). As a freshman, he won the May 20, 2011 NIAA AAAA high jump championship with a jump of 6 feet 7 inches (2.01 m). As a sophomore, he sat out of NIAA competition after transferring. His father's best high jump in high school was 6 feet 9 inches (2.06 m). On June 24, 2012, Cunningham established the USATF 15–16 age group Outdoor Track & Field record with a jump of 2.16 metres (7 ft 1.0 in). Cunningham won the August 2012 National AAU Junior Olympic Games high jump with a jump of 7 feet 2 inches (2.18 m). He actually won the 15–16 age group with a height of 6 feet 9 inches (2.06 m). The Junior Olympic age group record of 7 feet 0 inches (2.13 m) by Johnnie Bartley had stood since 1986, but Cunningham continued to jump past his winning height to establish a new Junior Olympic record. By April 11 of his 2013 junior season, he had already cleared 7 feet (2.13 m), which was the NIAA state championship record, four times that season. In the May 18, 2013 NIAA state championships, he achieved a high jump of 7 feet 3.25 inches (2.22 m), which was the best height by a high school high jumper in the nation that year. He earned the 2013 Nevada Track & Field Gatorade Player of the Year award. In the August 2013 AAU Junior Olympics, he was second or third in the 17–18 age group with a height of 6 feet 10 inches (2.08 m) or 7 feet (2.13 m), depending on the source. On January 3, 2014, he made a verbal commitment to the USC Trojans track team, shunning over 30 football scholarship offers. In 2014 at the annual Mt. SAC (Mt. San Antonio College) Relays, he set the American high school season best for boys of 7 feet 2 inches (2.18 m) on the same April 12 day his sister Vashti did so for girls with 6 feet 2 inches (1.88 m). He was surpassed by Bryant O'Georgia of Arizona by one quarter inch in May. Cunningham placed first in the May 24, 2014 NIAA state championship with a high jump of 6 feet 11 inches (2.11 m) and second with a long jump of 22 feet 8.25 inches (6.92 m).

As a freshman at the University of Southern California, Cunningham finished second at the Pac-12 Outdoor Championships with a height of 2.16 metres (7 ft 1 in) and tied for 8th at the 2015 NCAA Division I Outdoor Track and Field Championships (2.16 metres (7 ft 1 in)). Two weeks later, he won the U.S. Junior National Championship with a 2.20 m (7 ft 2 1/2 in). His top 8 finish in the NCAAs earned him All-American recognition. In his freshman year, Randall was coached by 2-time Olympian Jamie Nieto who took over as the USC assistant coach in charge of jumps and multi-events on August 20, 2014. Later that summer he earned a gold medal at the 2015 Pan American Junior Athletics Championships with a jump of 2.16 m (7 ft 1 in). His sister Vashti also won gold at that same competition.

As a sophomore, he was second again at the Pac-12 Outdoor Championship with a height of 2.18 metres (7 ft 1.8 in) and won the 2016 NCAA Division I Outdoor Track and Field Championships with a height of 2.25 metres (7 ft 4.6 in), which is an outdoor personal best. Cunningham no-heighted at the July 8, 2016 Olympic Trials qualifying round after three unsuccessful attempts at 2.14 metres (7 ft 0.3 in). The trials were held during a torrential downpour that was deemed severe enough to suspend the women's pole vault event and that seemed to impair the men's discus event.

As a junior, Cunningham was recognized on March 6 as the west region Men's Field Athlete of the Year for the indoor season by the United States Track & Field and Cross Country Coaches Association. He placed fourth at the March 11, 2017 NCAA Division I Indoor Track and Field Championships with a height of 2.23 metres (7 ft 3.8 in), earning him another All-American recognition.

As a senior, Cunningham won the 2018 NCAA Division I Indoor Track and Field Championships with a USC record height of 2.29 metres (7 ft 6.2 in).

== Personal life ==
In a highly anticipated birth, Cunningham II was born to Randall Cunningham and Felicity (née De Jager) in Las Vegas on January 4, 1996. He is well known as the son of 2-time All-American punter and 4-time Pro Bowl quarterback Cunningham. He is also the nephew of College Football Hall of Fame running back Sam Cunningham. In addition, he has two other Cunningham uncles (A.C. and Bruce) who played Division I football. His mother, Felicity, is a native South African who was formerly a professional ballerina with the Dance Theatre of Harlem. His younger sister, Vashti Cunningham, is a World Indoor Champion and subsequently signed a professional contract with Nike while still in high school. His brother, Christian, died at age 2. Cunningham also competed in the long jump in high school.

As of his junior year in high school, Cunningham intended to compete in both football and track in college, although his father's alma mater, UNLV, did not have a men's track program. Baylor, who made him his first offer, had coined the nickname RC2, a reference to RG3, for him. He aspired to break the national high school record of 7 feet 5.75 inches (2.28 m), and he also aspired to be an Olympic high jumper, but the automatic qualifying jump for the 2012 team was 2.28 m (7 ft 5 3/4 in). The qualifying standard for the 2016 Olympics was 2.29 m (7 ft 6 in).
