= Jett Washington =

American football player (born 2007)

Oregon Ducks
- Position: Safety
- Class: Freshman

Personal information
- Born: November 13, 2007 (age 18)
- Listed height: 6 ft 5 in (1.96 m)
- Listed weight: 205 lb (93 kg)

Career information
- High school: Bishop Gorman (Las Vegas, Nevada)
- College: Oregon (2026–present)

Jett Washington (born November 13, 2007) is an American college football safety for the Oregon Ducks.

== Early life ==
Washington is from Las Vegas, Nevada. He is the nephew of former NBA player Kobe Bryant. He grew up playing basketball and flag football before later trying out tackle football. He attended Bishop Gorman High School where he played football and basketball, becoming a starting safety as a sophomore in football after having initially been a wide receiver. That year, he helped his team to the state championship and a national championship with a perfect record of 12–0, tallying 37 tackles and two interceptions. After the football season, Washington led the basketball team to a state title, averaging 13 points and eight rebounds per game.

Washington was named the MaxPreps Nevada Player of the Year as a junior in 2024 after he posted 38 tackles, five interceptions, two pass breakups and a forced fumble. He helped the football team to a state title and then the basketball team to a state title in his junior season. He recorded 48 tackles and four interceptions as a senior while winning another state football championship.

A five-star recruit, Washington was ranked the number one safety and a top-25 player overall in the nation in the class of 2026. He committed to play college football for the Oregon Ducks. He signed to play for the Ducks in December 2025.
