= Bishop Gorman High School =

Private, coeducational school in Las Vegas, Nevada, United States

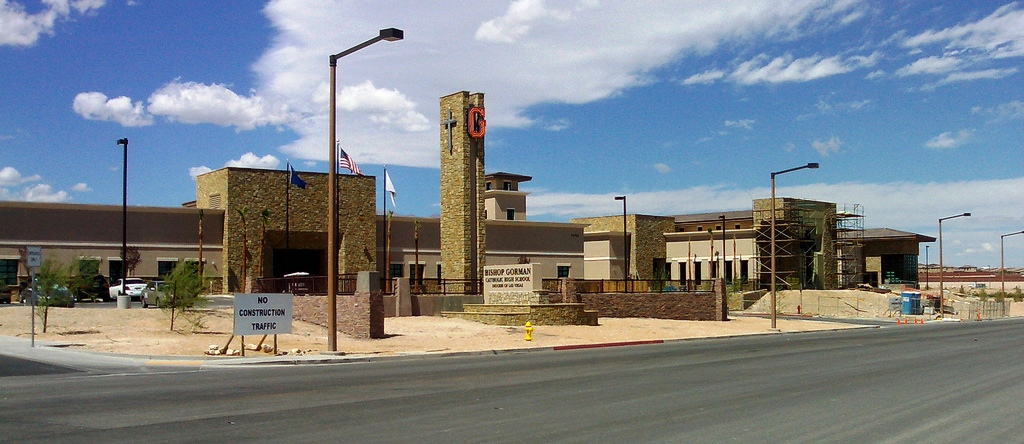

Location
- 5959 South Hualapai Way; Las Vegas, (Clark County), Nevada 89148; United States; 36°4′54″N 115°19′2″W

Information
- Type: Private, parochial, college preparatory
- Religious affiliation: Roman Catholic
- Established: September 7, 1954; 72 years ago
- Oversight: Roman Catholic Diocese of Las Vegas
- Principal: Tracy Goode
- Teaching staff: 89.0 (FTE) (2023–24)
- Grades: 9–12
- Gender: Co-educational
- Enrollment: 1,533 (2023–24)
- Student to teacher ratio: 17.2:1 (2023–24)
- Campus size: 36 acres (15 ha)
- Campus type: Large suburban
- Colors: Royal blue Orange
- Athletics conference: Southwest Division; Sunset 4A Region; Nevada Interscholastic Activities Association (NIAA)
- Mascot: Gaels
- Nickname: Gaels
- Accreditation: Northwest Accreditation Commission
- Publication: The Gael Gazette
- Newspaper: The Lance
- Yearbook: Archive
- School fees: New student enrollment: $500; Application fee (transfer students): $100; Registration fee: $600; Books: $300; Graduation fee (seniors): $150
- Tuition: Non-catholic: $16,800; Catholic: $15,400
- Affiliation: NCEA
- Website: www.bishopgorman.org

Bishop Gorman High School (commonly referred to as Gorman or BGHS) is a four-year private, Roman Catholic college preparatory school located in Las Vegas, Nevada. The school is administered by the Archdiocese of Las Vegas. The school opened in 1954. Its mascot is a Gael, a mounted Irish Knight.

== History ==
Bishop Gorman High School opened its doors on September 7, 1954. Bishop Dwyer named it after his predecessor, Thomas Kiely Gorman, the first Catholic Bishop of the Reno-Las Vegas Diocese.

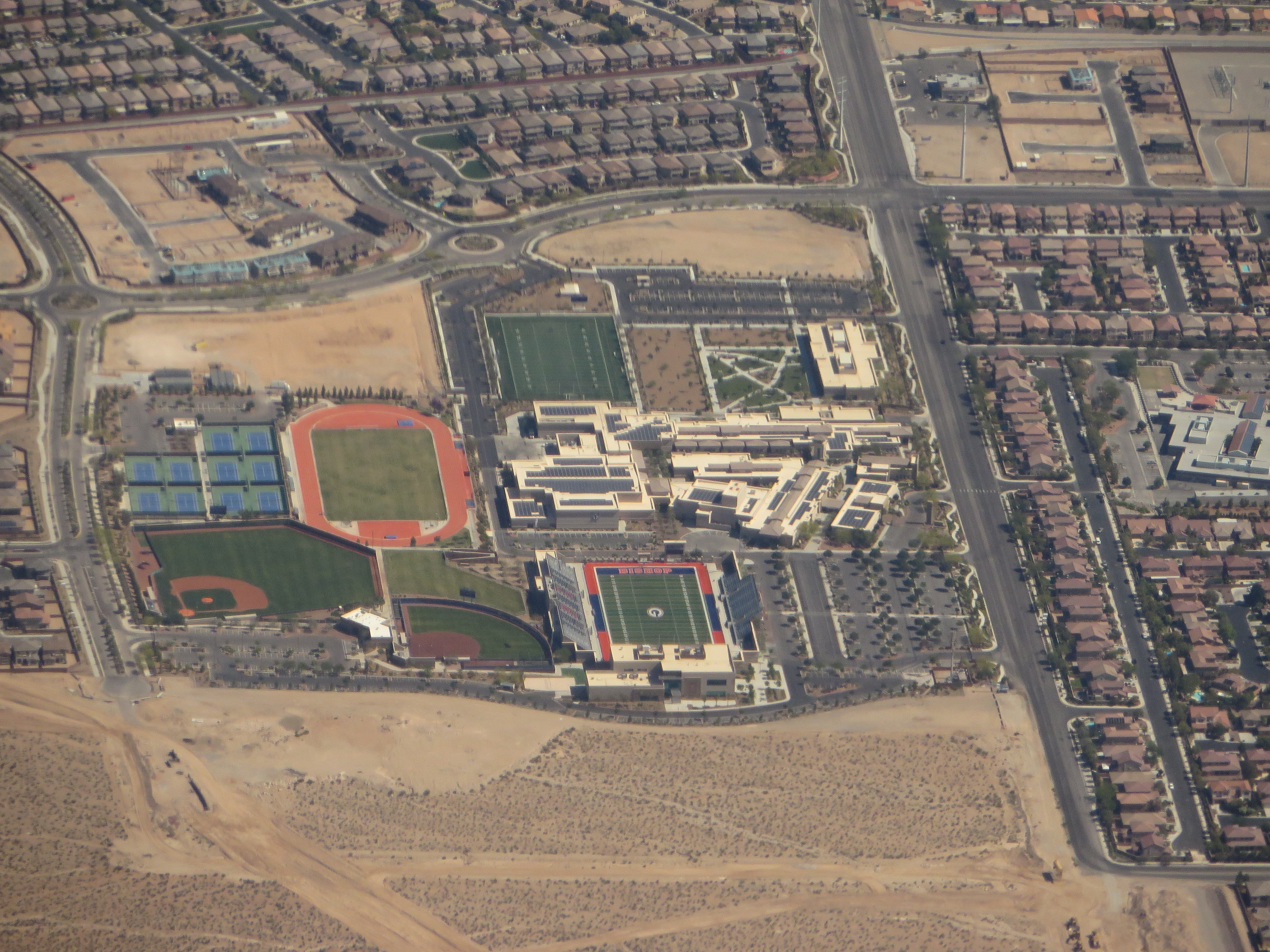
Aerial photo of Bishop Gorman in 2015

The campus was originally located near Downtown Las Vegas, at 1801 S. Maryland Pkwy. Classes began at its current Summerlin location on September 5, 2007. The new 187,000-square-foot (17,400 m^{2}) school, located on a campus of 36 acres (15 ha), cost $96 million to build.

Later on, an athletic center (referred to as the ATC) was donated for $18 million.

== Extracurricular activities ==
=== Athletics ===
The athletics program and teams of Bishop Gorman are known as the Gaels, and compete in the Southwest Division of the Sunset 5A Region. The Gaels have been described by USA Today and Sports Illustrated as being among the top thousand high school athletic programs in the United States, as well as ranked within the top ten for MaxPreps national high school football rankings.

In the summer of 2008, the Gaels baseball team, sponsored by American Legion Post 76 in Las Vegas, won the American Legion World Series, a first for any Nevada high school. They ended up fielding 798 points total in football, more than any other high school in the nation for the 2009 season and ended up being ranked 46th in the nation by Rivals.

Coach Tony Sanchez took over as Bishop Gorman High School's head football coach in March 2009. In 2010 and 2011, he led Gorman to a varsity record of 28-2 and an overall program record of 61-4. At the start of the 2012 season, Gorman beat nationally ranked teams Our Lady of Good Counsel in Maryland and Saint Louis School in Hawaii to raise its high school ranking into the top ten schools. Both games were televised, by ESPN and Fox networks, respectively. In 2014 and 2015, Bishop Gorman won back-to-back national championships. Sanchez then left the program to coach at the collegiate level.

Former D1 wrestler, 3rd-degree black belt in Gracie Brazilian Jiu-Jitsu, 3-time Team USA member, 5-time world grappling champ (152-5 overall, 78-0 FILA Int), and head strategist coach for MMA, Ricky Lundell is the current head wrestling coach for the Gaels, along with his assistant coach Todd Prace.

== Notable alumni ==
Name	Year	Profession	Notability	Reference
Mike Adras	1979	Basketball Coach	Former basketball coach for Northern Arizona University	
Ramiz Ahmed	2013	Football Player	Kicker who played for the Green Bay Packers	
Antonio Alamo Jr.	1983	Physician/Politician	Former Nevada Gaming Commission Chair	
Micah Alejado	2024	Football Player	College football quarterback for the Hawaii Rainbow Warriors	
Rosco Allen	2012	Basketball player	Professional basketball player in Japan and Spain, played college basketball at Stanford	
Tommy Armour III	1978	Golfer	PGA Tour golfer	
Francis J. Beckwith	1978	Philosopher	Philosopher and author	
Jillian Bell	2002	Actress	Former Saturday Night Live writer and star of Workaholics	
Tristan Blackmon	2014	Soccer Player	Vancouver Whitecaps FC right back	
Jonathan Brady	2022	Football Player	College football wide receiver and return specialist for Indiana	
Zachariah Branch	2023	Football Player	College football wide receiver for Georgia	
Charisma Carpenter	Transferred	Actress	Star of Buffy the Vampire Slayer	
Ben Carter	2012	Basketball Player	Professional basketball player in Israel, played college basketball at Oregon, UNLV, and Michigan State	
Taylor Cole	2007	Baseball Player	former MLB pitcher, Toronto Blue Jays and Los Angeles Angels	
Zach Collins	2016	Basketball player	Center who plays for the Chicago Bulls	
Marty Cordova	1987	Baseball Player	1995 AL Rookie of the Year	
Justin Crawford	2022	Baseball Player	Philadelphia Phillies first round pick	
Randall Cunningham II	2014	Track & Field Athlete	High Jumper	
Vashti Cunningham	2016	Track & Field Athlete	National champion high jumper who is signed to Nike	
Bison Dele	1987	Basketball Player	1997 NBA Champion, Reported missing in 2002 in the South Pacific	
Anthony DiMaria	1984	Director	Best known for his documentary Jay Sebring....Cutting to the Truth	
Blake Ezor	1986	Football player	Former Denver Broncos running back	
Frank Fertitta III	1980	Businessman	CEO of Station Casinos and founder of Zuffa	
Lorenzo Fertitta	1987	Businessman	Former UFC CEO	
Johnny Field	2010	Baseball player	Former Tampa Bay Rays and Minnesota Twins outfielder	
Charvez Foger	1985	Football Player	Former Running back who played college football at Nevada	
Ozzie Fumo	1983	Politician	Member of the Nevada Assembly from the 21st district	
Joey Gallo	2012	Baseball Player	2x MLB All Star outfielder	
Nick Gates	2014	Football Player	Center for the Washington Commanders	
Noah Gragson	Transferred	Racing car driver	NASCAR driver	
Cadyn Grenier	2015	Baseball Player	Former Baltimore Orioles prospect, played college baseball at Oregon State	
Xavier Grimble	2010	Football Player	Former tight end for the Pittsburgh Steelers	
D. J. Herman	2021	Football Player	NFL fullback for the Miami Dolphins	
David Humm	1971	Football Player	Former quarterback who won 2 Superbowls with the Oakland/Los Angeles Raiders	
Chase Jeter	2015	Basketball Player	Former Duke and Arizona center	
Brevin Jordan	2018	Football Player	Tight End for the Houston Texans	
Justin Kaye	1995	Baseball Pitcher	Former pitcher for the Seattle Mariners	
Kyu Blu Kelly	2019	Football Player	Cornerback for the Las Vegas Raiders	
Joe Kristosik	1994	Football Player	Former All American punter for UNLV	
Orr Leumi	2015	Basketball player	Shooting Guard for Hapoel Be'er Sheva B.C. in Israel	
Tyjon Lindsey	2017	Football Player	Wide Receiver for the Seattle Seahawks	
Johnathan Loyd	2010	Basketball Player	Professional basketball player who played college basketball and football at Oregon	
Alizé Mack	2015	Football Player	Tight End who was drafted by the New Orleans Saints	
Tate Martell	2017	Football Player	Quarterback who played college football for Ohio State, Miami, and UNLV	
Rosie Mercado	Transferred in 1999	Model	Plus-size model, celebrity makeup artist, fashion designer and television personality	
John Mobley Jr.	Transferred in 2023	Basketball player	College basketball point guard for the Ohio State Buckeyes	
Demetris Morant	2012	Basketball Player	Power forward who plays professionally in Romania, played college basketball at UNLV and Florida Gulf Coast	
Shabazz Muhammad	2012	Basketball Player	Shooting Guard who currently plays in Indonesia. Played for the Minnesota Timberwolves and Milwaukee Bucks	
DeMarco Murray	2006	Football Player	Running Back who was the 2014 NFL Offensive Player of the Year with the Dallas Cowboys	
Jalen Nailor	2018	Football Player	Wide Receiver for the Minnesota Vikings	
Chuck O'Bannon Jr.	2017	Basketball Player	College Shooting Guard who currently plays for TCU	
Rome Odunze	2020	Football Player	NFL wide receiver for the Chicago Bears	
Matt Othick	1988	Basketball Player	Point Guard who played for the San Antonio Spurs	
Inbee Park	2006	Golfer	LPGA golfer and Olympic gold medalist	
Ryan Reynolds	2005	Football Player	Former linebacker for the Oklahoma Sooners	
Joey Rickard	2009	Baseball Player	Outfielder who played for the Baltimore Orioles and San Francisco Giants	
Donn Roach	2008	Baseball Player	Former MLB pitcher	
Ryan Ross	2004	Musician	Panic! at the Disco guitarist, vocalist, and songwriter	
Grey Ruegamer	1994	Football Player	Center who won two Super Bowl Championships with the New England Patriots and New York Giants	
Paul Sewald	2008	Baseball Pitcher	Pitcher for the Arizona Diamondbacks	
Matt Smith	1997	Baseball Player	Former pitcher for the New York Yankees and Philadelphia Phillies	
Spencer Smith	2005	Musician	Panic! at the Disco drummer	
Anu Solomon	2013	Football Player	Former college football quarterback who played for Arizona and Baylor	
Ronnie Stanley	2012	Football Player	All-Pro Offensive Tackle for the Baltimore Ravens	
Danny Tarkanian	1980	Politician	Former presidential candidate	
Dorian Thompson-Robinson	2018	Football Player	Quarterback for the Cleveland Browns	
Cedric Tillman	2018	Football Player	Wide Receiver for the Cleveland Browns	
Edefuan Ulofoshio	2018	Football Player	Linebacker for Buffalo Bills	
Tyler Wagner	2009	Baseball Player	Former pitcher for the Milwaukee Brewers and Arizona Diamondbacks	
Jett Washington	2026	Football Player	College football safety for the Oregon Ducks	
C. J. Watson	2002	Basketball Player	Point guard who played ten years in the NBA	
Austin Wells	2018	Baseball Player	Catcher for the New York Yankees	
Darrion Williams	2022	Basketball Player	Shooting guard and small forward for the Texas Tech Red Raiders	
Stephen Zimmerman	2015	Basketball Player	Center who played for the Orlando Magic	
Alexander Sample	1978	Catholic prelate	Archbishop of Portland in Oregon, formerly Bishop of Marquette	

== Notable staff ==
- Mike Carter (born 1955), American-Israeli former basketball player
- Tim Chambers (1965–2019), college baseball coach
- Tony Sanchez (born 1974), college football coach and former player
