= Dr. Phil Primetime =

American talk show

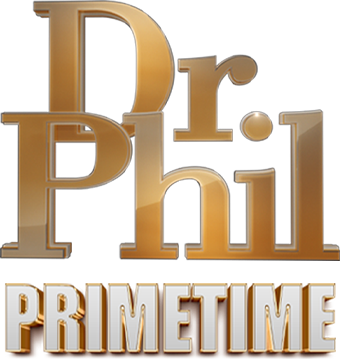
- Genre: Talk show
- Presented by: Phil McGraw
- Country of origin: United States
- Original language: English
- No. of seasons: 1

Production
- Production location: Fort Worth, Texas
- Camera setup: Multiple
- Running time: 42 minutes
- Production company: Merit Street Media

Original release
- Network: Merit TV; Merit+
- Release: April 2, 2024 – July 2, 2025

Related
- Dr. Phil (talk show)

Dr. Phil Primetime is an American prime time talk show hosted by Phil McGraw, airing on Merit TV, from Fort Worth, Texas. The show premiered on April 2, 2024, and was produced by McGraw's own production company, Merit Street Media. Its accompanying streaming service Merit+ also carries the show.

On July 2, 2025, Merit Street Media filed for Chapter 11 bankruptcy protection and suspended first-run programming, with the last first-run episode of the show on the network airing that day.

== History ==
On November 6, 2023, four months after the end of his daytime show, McGraw announced plans for a new prime time show on his own television network, Merit TV. Dozens of longtime Dr. Phil staffers were reported to have relocated from Los Angeles to Texas to continue working alongside McGraw.

The first episode aired on April 2, 2024, and featured a debate between Hamas defector Mosab Yousef and two pro-Palestinian college students. On June 7, 2024, McGraw drew criticism for interviewing then-former U.S. president and 2024 presidential candidate Donald Trump and agreeing that his hush money trial was unfair, describing it as "prosecutorial abuse".

== Format ==
Most episodes consist of McGraw talking to guests about their personal issues or general hot-button issues, in front of a live studio audience. In contrast to his previous Dr. Phil show, the program features more of McGraw's personal views on education, family values and immigration, a number of which have been described as conservative talking points.

A number of episodes featured interviews of political figures such as Mayor of New York City Eric Adams, Israeli prime minister Benjamin Netanyahu, then-presidential candidate Robert F. Kennedy Jr. and Canadian commentator Jordan Peterson. In June 2025, McGraw was embedded with Immigration and Customs Enforcement (ICE) during raids by the agency (and resulting protests) in Los Angeles for segments on the program, which featured "exclusive" appearances and interviews with "Border Czar" Tom Homan.
