= Ricky Lundell =

American martial artist

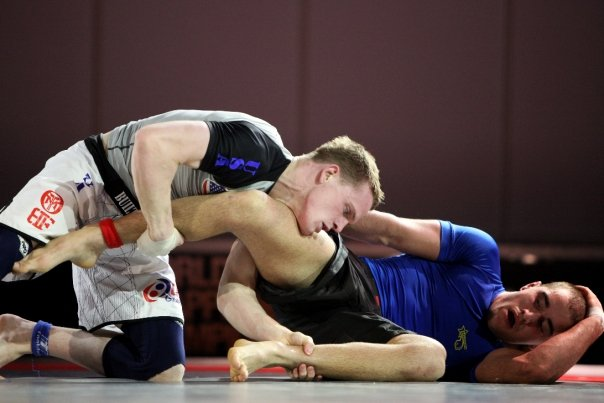
- Style: Gracie Jiu-Jitsu, Wrestling
- Teachers: Pedro Sauer, Cael Sanderson
- Rank: 3rd degree black belt in Brazilian Jiu-Jitsu

Other information
- Website: http://www.universityofgrappling.com/

Ricky Lundell is a martial artist and a martial arts coach. He is a 3rd degree Brazilian Jiu Jitsu black belt under Pedro Sauer. Credited with being one of the youngest North American to receive the rank of black belt in Brazilian Jiu-Jitsu at age 19, Ricky has competed successfully at various international grappling competitions, and has also made a career in coaching. His adeptness at grappling has earned him the nickname 'The Grappling Chimera'.

== College ==
Ricky started college at Utah Valley University when he was 15 years old and graduated with a science degree at 18. He was recruited by Cody and Cael Sanderson as a college senior to wrestle for Iowa State University at the age of 20. He is the first NCAA Division I wrestler to ever be recruited having only jiu-jitsu/submission grappling experience and no folkstyle match experience. Despite the NCAA's refusal to give Ricky any eligibility to start for the team at Iowa State University, Ricky lettered in wrestling and went on to win the USA World Team Trials where he won the Most Outstanding Grappler award. He later won the FILA Grappling World Championship while competing for the Cyclones.

== Competition ==
Ricky is a two-time Pancrase (Submission Wrestling) World Champion at 149 lbs and a one-time Absolute Pancrase World Champion. He was the lightest person to win the absolute division of Pancrase by over 20 lbs and submitted 265 lbs two-time FILA heavyweight division silver medalist Brandon Ruiz. He represented the USA for Grappling twice and is a two-time FILA World Championship in Submission Grappling. Ricky holds notable wins over several world champions including Nicolas Renier, Tom Lecuyer, Brandon Ruiz, Alberto Crane and Jeff Glover, both in no-gi submission grappling tournaments. He also defeated John Kavanagh by way of footlock in the finals of the 2007 FILA world championships.

== Coaching ==
Lundell is a strategy coach and head trainer for MMA at the University of Grappling in Lindon, Utah, a position he has held since 2008. He is the coach of current UFC fighters Jon Jones, Travis Browne, Frank Mir and former fighters Dan Hardy, Miesha Tate, and Carlos Condit.
