= Renovate My Family =

2004 reality television series

- Genre: Reality television
- Presented by: Jay McGraw
- Country of origin: United States
- Original language: English
- No. of seasons: 1
- No. of episodes: 15

Production
- Executive producers: Jean-Michel Michenaud; Chris Cowan; Ray Giuliani
- Running time: 60 minutes
- Production company: Rocket Science Laboratories

Original release
- Network: Fox
- Release: September 1, 2004 – August 15, 2005

Renovate My Family is an American reality television series broadcast by the Fox Broadcasting Company (Fox). The series was broadcast for one season from September 1, 2004, to August 15, 2005. Each episode of the series followed one family who received a "full-force makeover", which included renovations to their house and improvements to their day-to-day lifestyles. The series was hosted by American television producer Jay McGraw.

In 2005, Renovate My Family was one of several television programs cited in a class-action lawsuit filed by the Writers Guild of America concerning labor law violations.

== Format ==
It begins with the families receiving the announcement, usually in an unexpected place where many people are present (and all are in on the surprise). The family is then rushed back to their home where they are given a small amount of time to pack their things and leave their house once they are chosen because a group of home designers will build a new house for them in its place. They have only one week to build the house. The family gets to take part in tearing the house down as well.

The families who are chosen for Renovate My Family usually have some sort of family issue. While the house is being built, the host takes the family to a special retreat for that week where the family not only gets to spend time together but also must confront the family issue(s) through special counseling. On the day before the house is due to be finished, the family is separated and taken to separate salons where each family member is given a makeover. They are then reunited back at their home just before the new house is to be unveiled.

== Production ==
The series' working title was Family Time. According to Mike Darnell, "[t]he basic idea is to take every makeover show you've ever seen and roll it into one."

== Lawsuits ==
The Roisers, who were featured on the third episode of the series, filed a lawsuit against Fox and Rocket Science Laboratories, in which they claimed "shoddy work" which created safety hazards in their home.

On August 23, 2005, Renovate My Family was one of several television programs cited in a class-action lawsuit filed by the Writers Guild of America, which concerned labor law violations.
