= Jay McGraw =

American businessman (born 1979)

- Born: Jay Phillip McGraw; September 12, 1979 (age 46); Wichita Falls, Texas, U.S.
- Education: University of Texas at Austin (BS); Southern Methodist University (JD)
- Occupations: Television producer, author
- Spouse: Erica Dahm (m. 2006)
- Children: 2
- Parents: Phil McGraw (father); Robin Jameson (mother)

Jay Phillip McGraw (born September 12, 1979) is an American television producer and author. He is the son of television therapist Phil McGraw, and has appeared on and served as executive producer on his father's television show Dr. Phil. He has also written several books aimed at young people, and is the founder of Stage 29 Productions, a media production company.

== Early life and education ==
Jay McGraw was born in Wichita Falls, Texas, on September 12, 1979, to Dr. Phil McGraw and his wife Robin Jameson. He attended Greenhill School and is a graduate of the University of Texas at Austin, receiving a BS in psychology. He earned his JD from Southern Methodist University.

== Career ==
McGraw is president and CEO of Stage 29 Productions in Los Angeles, a company he co-founded with his father. He appeared as host of Renovate My Family, which aired on Fox. He is executive producer of the television series The Doctors. He is also president and CEO of publisher Bird Street Books.

In 2010, McGraw launched RumorFix, an anti-tabloid website that examines tabloid rumors and stories to verify whether or not they are factual. If a story is deemed true, the website labels it as "It's True", with unconfirmed rumors marked as "Still a Rumor" and false rumors marked with "RumorFixed". Mediaite commented that the site was very similar to Gossip Cop, a pre-existing website that also specialized in investigating whether or not celebrity rumors were true or false.

== Personal life ==
McGraw married Playboy model Erica Dahm at his parents' home in Beverly Hills on August 12, 2006. A reception for 400 guests followed the ceremony at the Beverly Hills Hotel. In March 2010, Dahm gave birth to the couple's first child, a daughter named Avery Elizabeth. In March 2011, McGraw and his wife announced they were expecting their second child. Dahm gave birth to a son, London Phillip, in August 2011.

== Filmography ==
- Moochers (2007)

== Bibliography ==
- Closing the Gap: A Strategy for Bringing Parents and Teens Together (2001) ISBN 0-7432-2469-8
- Life Strategies for Teens (2000) ISBN 0-7432-1546-X
- Life Strategies for Teens Workbook ISBN 0743224701
- Daily Life Strategies for Teens (2001) ISBN 0-7432-2471-X
- The Ultimate Weight Solution for Teens (co-authored with Dr. Phil) (2003) ISBN 0-7432-5747-2
