= Phil McGraw =

American television host and psychologist (born 1950)

Dr. Phil
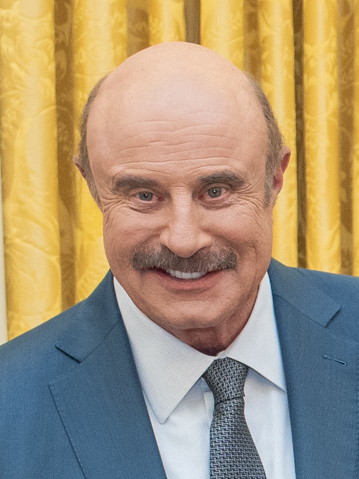
- McGraw in 2025
- Born: Phillip Calvin McGraw; September 1, 1950 (age 76); Vinita, Oklahoma, U.S.
- Education: Midwestern State University (BA); North Texas State University (MA, PhD)
- Occupations: Television host; author
- Spouses: Debbie Higgins McCall (m. 1970; ann. 1973); Robin Jameson (m. 1976)
- Children: 2, including Jay
- Relatives: Erica Dahm (daughter-in-law)
- Website: drphil.com (personal) meritstreetmedia.com (TV network)

Phillip Calvin McGraw (born September 1, 1950), better known professionally as Dr. Phil, is an American television personality and author. He is best known for hosting the daytime talk show Dr. Phil (2002–2023). McGraw holds a doctorate in clinical psychology, though he ceased renewing his license to practice psychology in 2006.

McGraw frequently appeared on The Oprah Winfrey Show in the late 1990s. Oprah Winfrey then helped McGraw launch his own advice show, Dr. Phil, in September 2002. In October 2015, his show was renewed for an additional five seasons. In October 2018, Dr. Phil was extended until 2023. In May 2023, the show concluded after a 21-season run.

== Early life and education ==
Phillip Calvin McGraw was born in Vinita, Oklahoma, on September 1, 1950, the son of Joseph J. McGraw Jr. (1924–1993) and his wife Anne Geraldine "Jerry" (née Stevens; 1924–2011). He grew up with two older sisters, Deana and Donna, and younger sister Brenda in the oilfields of North Texas where his father was an equipment supplier. At age 13, he worked at an A&W Root Beer stand and a local chain called Pizza Planet in Oklahoma City.

McGraw moved to Kansas with his father, who pursued his lifelong goal of becoming a psychologist. There, Phil attended Shawnee Mission North High School in Overland Park, Kansas. He played linebacker on the high school football team and, in 1968, earned a football scholarship to the University of Tulsa where he played middle linebacker under coach Glenn Dobbs.

He later transferred to Midwestern State University in Wichita Falls, Texas, where he graduated in 1975 with a B.A. in psychology. He went on to earn an M.A. in experimental psychology in 1976 and a Ph.D. in clinical psychology in 1979, both at North Texas State University (now the University of North Texas), where his dissertation was titled "Rheumatoid Arthritis: A Psychological Intervention." He did a year of post-doctoral training in forensic psychology at the Wilmington Institute. McGraw's doctoral advisor was Frank Lawlis, who later became the primary contributing psychologist for the Dr. Phil television show.

== Early career ==
After obtaining his doctorate, McGraw rejoined his father in Wichita Falls, Texas, where the elder McGraw had established his private psychology practice.

In 1971, McGraw lived in Topeka, Kansas, and ran the Grecian Health Spa alongside his father and two friends. McGraw closed the business, filed for bankruptcy and moved out of state in September 1973. McGraw had sold the lifetime membership contracts customers had signed to another company, resulting in customers being still legally responsible for the membership even though the spa was closed. McGraw and his business partners were investigated by the state's Attorney General office. Lead investigator Emory Goad said "McGraw had been pulling off a textbook example of a membership scam. He was signing up hundreds of customers to long, expensive contracts, then turning around and selling the contracts to a financial institution for a percentage of the total value up front in cash. He then simply shut down the spa at some point after collecting that money and left town. It was a total rip-off because the customers would still be liable for the contract payments, only now to the financial institution." McGraw was sued by several Topeka banks for $41,000 they claimed he owed, but the lawsuits and investigation stalled when he left the state.

In 1985, McGraw and his father partnered with Thelma Box, a Texas businesswoman, in presenting "Pathways" self-help seminars. In October 1991, six years after joining Box, the younger McGraw sold his share in the company for $325,000.

In 1990, McGraw co-founded Courtroom Sciences, Inc. (CSI), a trial consulting firm, with lawyer Gary Dobbs. CSI would perform "dry runs" of court cases in simulated courtrooms, and McGraw would offer advice about what parts of the lawyer's case worked and what parts did not. McGraw is no longer an officer or director of the company. The TV show Bull is based on McGraw's experience as a trial consultant, and he is credited as one of the creators of the series. McGraw began working with Oprah Winfrey through CSI.

== Television career ==
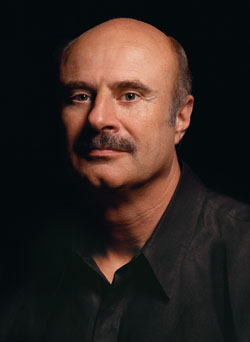
McGraw photographed for the cover of Newsweek magazine by Jerry Avenaim in 2001

=== Oprah Winfrey and the Dr. Phil show ===
In 1995, Oprah Winfrey hired McGraw's legal consulting firm CSI to prepare her for the Amarillo Texas beef trial. Winfrey was so impressed with McGraw that she thanked him for her victory in that case, which ended in 1998. Soon after, she invited him to appear on her show. His appearance proved so successful that he began appearing weekly as a relationship and life strategy expert on Tuesdays, starting in April 1998.

In September 2002, McGraw formed Peteski Productions and launched his own syndicated daily television show, Dr. Phil, produced by Winfrey's Harpo Studios. Dr. Phil is an advice show in which McGraw tackles a different topic each show, offering advice to his guests. He signed a five-year extension of his syndication deal with his show's distributors, King World Productions, Inc. The deal was to pay McGraw $15 million per year and keep the show in production through the 2013–2014 television season.

In 2007, McGraw was named 30th on the Forbes Celebrity 100 list. On May 21, 2007, Dr. Phil was ranked fourth by Nielsen Media Research, with 6.69 million viewers. On May 12, 2008, almost one year later, the show was ranked sixth with 5.69 million viewers. At that time, the only talk show more popular than Dr. Phil was The Oprah Winfrey Show. On December 11, 2018, Dr. Phil was the top syndicated show with a "2.9 live-plus-same-day" national Nielsen rating, ranking first among talk shows for the 117th consecutive week. His ranking improved, and by 2020, he was in the 22nd spot on the aforementioned Forbes list with earnings of $65.5 million.

=== Spin-off shows ===
In 2005, Phil and Jay McGraw, Phil's eldest son, formed Stage 29 Productions, and a week later, announced a new show called Moochers (similar to ABC's Kicked Out). Ultimately, the show was not produced.

In 2006, the Dr. Phil House (similar to CBS's Big Brother) began airing as part of the Dr. Phil television show. Following a protest by neighbors, the house in Los Angeles was shut down, and production resumed on a sound stage on a studio back lot.

Stage 29 launched Decision House in September 2007. It was executive produced by Jay McGraw, and featured Judge Lynn Toler (from Divorce Court) on MyNetworkTV. The show produced 13 episodes during its only season, which ran until May 24, 2008.

Late in 2007, McGraw began promoting the Dr. Phil Show spinoff series The Doctors. The show, which first aired in September 2008 and ended in August 2022, was hosted by television personality and ER physician Travis Stork; Jay was executive producer of the show. On September 8, 2008, The Doctors debuted and, as of November 10, had a 2.0 rating. The show won a Daytime Emmy Award as Outstanding Talk Show/Informative in 2010, and was nominated eight times between 2009 and 2013.

Daily Mail TV, executive produced by Phil and Jay McGraw, along with producers Martin Clarke, Carla Pennington, and Jeffrey Wilson, won the Daytime Emmy Award for Outstanding News Program in 2019.

In August 2021, the reality television series House Calls with Dr. Phil aired on CBS. In the series, McGraw visits various families at home and offers advice on their home life. The series ended after six episodes in September 2021.

=== Merit Street ===
In November 2023, McGraw announced Merit Street Media, a new Fort Worth-based media company and television network he planned to launch in 2024. The network would be devoted primarily to news and true crime programming, and be anchored by Dr. Phil Primetime—a successor to the syndicated Dr. Phil series. Merit Street launched on April 2, 2024. Just more than a year later, Merit Street filed for bankruptcy, alleging that Trinity Broadcasting Network, its broadcast partner, reneged on its obligations.

=== Doctor on Demand ===
In 2012, McGraw founded the telehealth company Doctor On Demand, an online platform that allows individuals to schedule virtual appointments with a network of physicians and therapists. The company launched a web and mobile service in 2014. The platform focuses on services related to preventative care, medication management, wellness, and mental health. According to ABC News, the company had a network of around 11,000 board-certified physicians as of 2015. In March 2020, during the COVID-19 pandemic, the company expanded its bandwidth and increased its pool of therapists to deal with the increasing volume of patients seeking virtual consultations and care.

== Approach to psychology ==
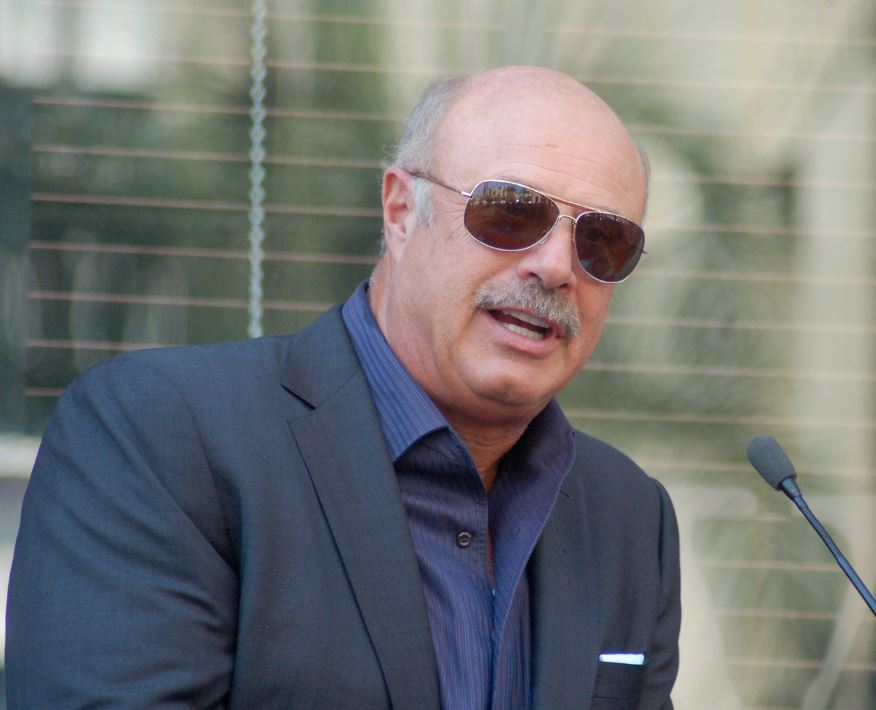
McGraw in 2013

McGraw's advice and methods have drawn criticism from fellow psychotherapists and non-experts. McGraw's critics regard advice given by him to be, at best, simplistic and, at worst, ineffective or harmful. The National Alliance on Mental Illness called McGraw's conduct in one episode of his television show "unethical" and "incredibly irresponsible". McGraw said in a 2001 Chicago Tribune interview that he never liked traditional one-on-one counseling, and that "I'm not the Hush-Puppies, pipe and 'Let's talk about your mother' kind of psychologist."

McGraw frequently advises individuals to seek professional help, particularly psychotherapy. A 2016 study at The Ohio State University found that viewers were more likely to seek professional mental health care for themselves and their children after seeing McGraw deal with similar issues on the Dr. Phil show. The study attributed this phenomenon to viewers' tendency to form a parasocial bond with McGraw through watching the show, and have increased belief in their ability to seek help.

== Controversies and lawsuits ==
=== 2000s ===
McGraw never had a license in California, where his show is taped, but in 2002, the California Board of Psychology determined that, because McGraw's television show was more about entertainment than psychology, McGraw did not need a license. McGraw stopped renewing his Texas license to practice psychology in 2006.

In 2003, McGraw lent his name and image to a line of nutritional supplements, including vitamin packets, meal replacement drinks, and power bars under the brand name Shape Up, under a licensing agreement with CSA Nutraceuticals, a Texas start-up. The deal stipulated that a certain percentage of sales would be given to the Dr. Phil Foundation, a Dallas charity that works on issues like childhood obesity. CSA Nutraceuticals stopped producing the supplements in 2004 after the Federal Trade Commission began investigating it for false advertising. Three disappointed consumers filed a lawsuit against the company in 2004, claiming that it made false or unproven claims. In 2006, a $10.5 million settlement was reached.

In 2003, The Making of Dr. Phil, an unauthorized biography by Sophia Dembling and Lisa Gutierrez, was published by John Wiley & Sons. The book covers McGraw's personal and professional life, including allegations of abuse and unethical practices, with interviews from his childhood friends and former classmates.

In 2006, McGraw was named a co-defendant, along with Paramount, CBS Television, and others, in a 2006 lawsuit filed concerning the disappearance of Natalee Holloway. The lawsuit was filed by Deepak Kalpoe and his brother Satish Kalpoe, who claimed that an interview they did with McGraw, aired in September 2005, was "manipulated and later broadcast as being accurate, and which portrays Deepak Kalpoe and Satish Kalpoe 'as engaging in criminal activity against Natalee Holloway and constitutes defamation.'" On March 17, 2015, the lawsuit against McGraw and CBS was dismissed. The court records disclosed the lawsuit by Deepak and Satish Kalpoe was rejected one week before the civil trial was set to begin.

Another contentious case arose in January 2008, when McGraw visited pop star Britney Spears in her hospital room. The visit by McGraw drew criticism from the Spears family and mental health professionals; it appeared to be part of an attempt at getting Spears and her parents to participate in an "intervention" on the Dr. Phil television show. Immediately after the visit, McGraw issued public statements about Spears' situation that the Spears' family spokeswoman Lou Taylor said violated their family's trust in McGraw. "This is another example of a trust being betrayed", Taylor told Today co-host Meredith Vieira. "Rather than helping the family's situation, the celebrity psychologist caused additional damage". Several mental health care professionals criticized McGraw for his actions, but fellow television psychologist Joyce Brothers defended McGraw. It was reported that a psychologist filed a complaint with the California Board of Psychology (BOP), alleging that McGraw had practiced psychology without a license and had violated doctor-patient privilege by discussing Spears' case with the media. A copy of the complaint appeared in the media, but there is no way to verify whether or not it was submitted to BOP as it does not disclose that information unless an investigation is opened. Martin Greenberg, a former BOP president, said on the Today Show that this incident was not a matter that the law covers or would be concerned about.

Later that year, McGraw was sued by Thomas Riccio, the memorabilia collector responsible for taping the Las Vegas robbery that led to O. J. Simpson's conviction. Riccio sued McGraw in Los Angeles Superior Court for defamation and other complaints, stemming from an interview he did on the Dr. Phil Show which aired on October 8, 2008. The claims were dismissed, with the judge finding that it was protected speech under the First Amendment.

=== 2010s ===
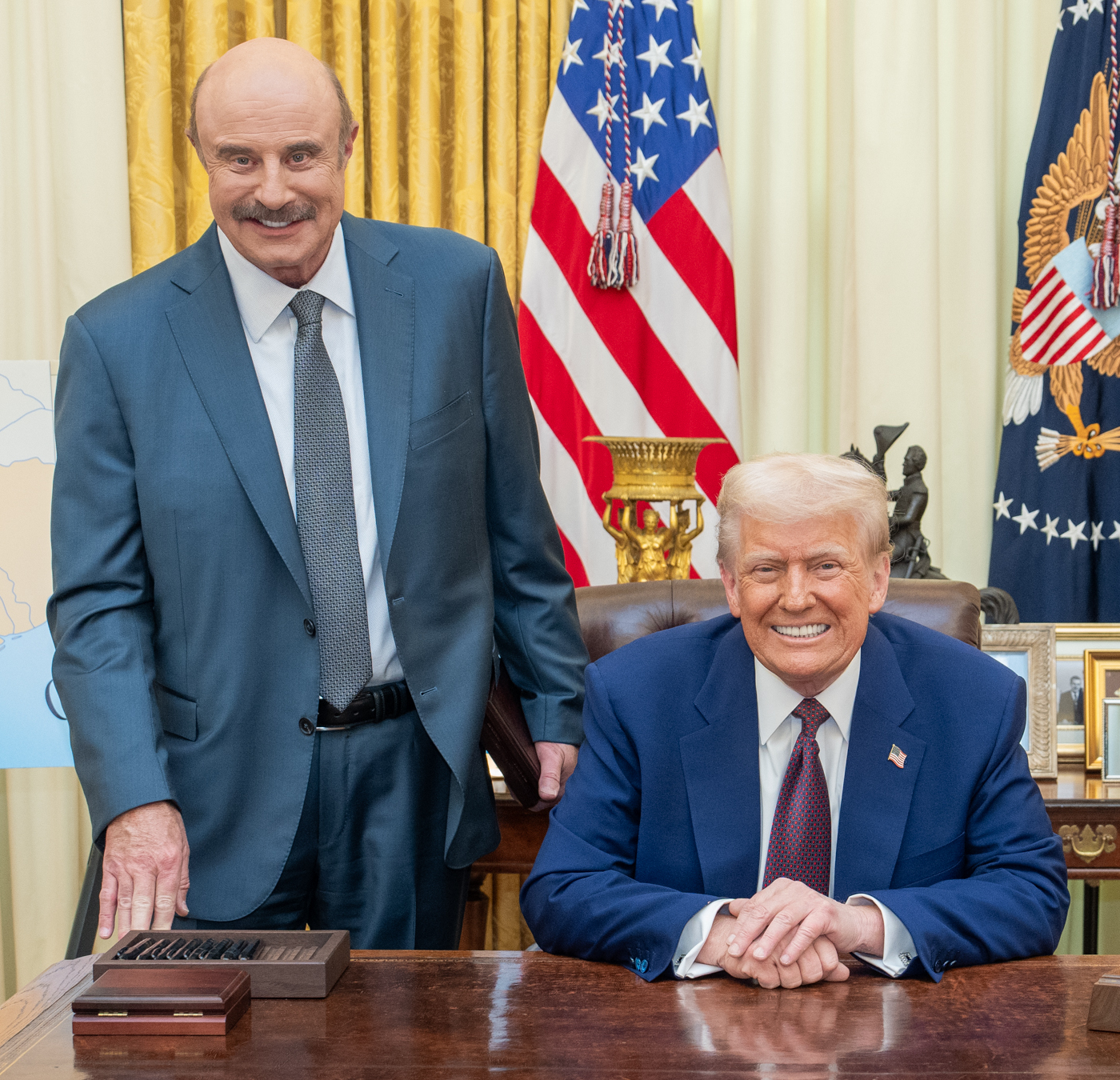
McGraw (left) with US President Donald Trump in 2025

In 2016, McGraw and his wife filed a $250 million defamation lawsuit against American Media, Inc., a publishing company that owns the National Enquirer and Radar Online, due primarily to their publishing an interview from a former patient who had accused McGraw of sexually assaulting her in the 1980s while under his care. McGraw had denied the sexual abuse allegations since they were first made against him in 2003. The lawsuit was later dropped on mutual terms.

McGraw was criticized for an interview featuring actress Shelley Duvall, which aired in 2016. Vivian Kubrick described McGraw's behavior towards Duvall as "exploitative" and "appallingly cruel" and called for a boycott of the show.

=== 2020s ===
In February 2022, around a dozen current and former employees of Dr. Phil alleged that they experienced "verbal abuse in a workplace that fosters fear, intimidation, and racism." Seven current employees also claimed that the show's guests are often manipulated and treated unethically. Attorneys for McGraw and his co-producer, Carla Pennington, categorically denied every allegation.

A former guest who appeared on Dr. Phil in 2016, Danielle Bregoli, also known as "Bhad Bhabie", criticized the methods of Turn-About Ranch, an Escalante, Utah-based therapeutic horse ranch for troubled youth that McGraw had endorsed. In 2022, McGraw, Viacom and CBS were sued by Bregoli and Hannah Archuleta, another former guest, for recommending their parents send them to Turn-About Ranch. Afterward, McGraw stopped recommending Turn-About Ranch on Dr. Phil.

In 2025, McGraw testified in a federal bankruptcy trial concerning Merit Street, his media company, amid allegations that he diverted assets from a $500 million deal with Trinity Broadcasting to launch a new venture, Envoy Media.

== Writing career ==
In 1999, McGraw published his first book, Life Strategies. In the following six years, McGraw published three additional relationship books, Relationship Rescue, Self Matters, and Family First. Since 2022, McGraw and physician John Whyte have co-written a series of columns for WebMD and USA Today. McGraw has also written op-eds for Sportico and The Hill.

=== Selected works ===
- McGraw, Phillip C. (1999). Life Strategies: Doing What Works, Doing What Matters. New York: Hyperion Books. ISBN 978-0-7868-8459-9.
- McGraw, Phillip C. (2000). The Relationship Rescue Workbook. New York: Hyperion. ISBN 978-0-7868-8604-3.
- McGraw, Phillip C. (2000). Relationship Rescue. New York: Hyperion. ISBN 978-0-7868-8598-5.
- McGraw, Phillip C. (2001). The Life Strategies Self-Discovery Journal: Finding What Matters Most for You. New York: Hyperion. ISBN 978-0-7868-8743-9.
- McGraw, Phillip C. (2001). Self Matters: Creating Your Life from the Inside Out. New York: Simon & Schuster Source. ISBN 978-0-7432-2423-9.
- McGraw, Phillip C. (2002). Getting Real: Lessons in Life, Marriage, and Family. Hay House Audio Books. ISBN 978-1-4019-0062-5.
- McGraw, Phillip C. (2003). The Self Matters Companion: Helping You Create Your Life from the Inside Out. New York: Free Press. ISBN 978-0-7432-2424-6.
- McGraw, Phillip C. (2003). The Ultimate Weight Solution: The 7 Keys to Weight Loss Freedom. New York: Free Press. ISBN 978-0-7432-3674-4.
- McGraw, Phillip C. (2003). The Ultimate Weight Solution Food Guide. Pocket Books. ISBN 978-0-7434-9039-9.
- McGraw, Phillip C. (2004). The Ultimate Weight Solution Cookbook: Recipes for Weight Loss Freedom. New York: Free Press. pp. 240. ISBN 978-0-7432-6475-4.
- McGraw, Phillip C. (2005). Family First: Your Step-by-Step Plan for Creating a Phenomenal Family. New York: Free Press. ISBN 978-0-7432-7377-0.
- McGraw, Phillip C. (2005). The Family First Workbook: Specific Tools, Strategies, and Skills for Creating a Phenomenal Family. New York: Free Press. ISBN 978-0-7432-8073-0.
- McGraw, Phillip C. (2006). Love Smart: Find the One You Want—Fix the One You Got. New York: Free Press. ISBN 978-0-7432-9243-6.
- McGraw, Phillip C. (2013). Life Code: The New Rules for Winning in the Real World. Bird Street Books. ISBN 978-0-9854-6273-4.
- McGraw, Phillip C. (2015). The 20/20 Diet: Turn Your Weight Loss Vision Into Reality. Ghost Mountain Books. ISBN 978-1939457318.

== Awards and recognition ==
McGraw was inducted into the Broadcasting & Cable Hall of Fame in 2015. In 2020, he received a star on the Hollywood Walk of Fame. McGraw was invited to give the presidential address at the 2006 annual convention of the American Psychological Association, where he received the APA's Presidential Citation for "highlighting mental health issues" to "more Americans than any other living psychologist."

== Personal life ==
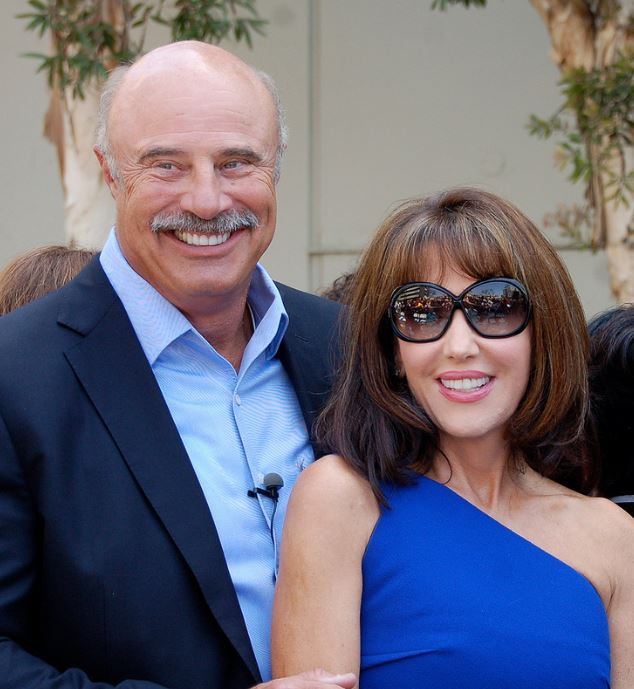
McGraw with his wife, Robin, in May 2013

McGraw married his first wife, Debbie Higgins McCall, in 1970, when he was 20 years old. According to her, McGraw was domineering and would not allow her to participate in the family business. She claimed that she was confined to domestic duties and instructed to begin lifting weights to improve her bustline. McCall also claimed that infidelity had ended their marriage.

While annulling the marriage in 1973, McGraw met and began dating Robin Jo Jameson, whom he married in 1976. The couple have two children together, Jay McGraw and Jordan McGraw.

McGraw is a private pilot, with an instrument rating, flying single-engine airplanes. He is a Christian. He launched a Dr. Phil Foundation charity in October 2003.

McGraw endorsed Donald Trump in the 2024 United States presidential election. In January 2025, McGraw accompanied ICE officers to a raid in Chicago, coinciding with deportations under the second Trump administration. In May 2025, Trump appointed McGraw to serve on the Religious Liberty Commission.

== Filmography ==
Year	Title	Role	Notes
2003	Frasier	Himself	Episode: "The Devil and Dr. Phil"
2004	Sesame Street	Himself	2 episodes
2006	Scary Movie 4	Himself	Film; cameo appearance
2006	The Simpsons	Himself (voice)	Episode: "Treehouse of Horror XVII"
2009	Madea Goes to Jail	Himself	Film; Cameo appearance
2009	Curb Your Enthusiasm	Himself	Episode: "Vehicular Fellatio"
2010	Hannah Montana	Himself	Episode: "I'll Always Remember You"
2016	WWE Raw	Himself	Episode: April 11, 2016
2017	A Crooked Somebody	Himself	Film; Cameo appearance
2019	PewDiePie's Meme Review	Himself	Episode: "Dr Phil hosts Meme Review"
2020	Who Wants to Be a Millionaire?	Himself	Episode: "In The Hot Seat: Catherine O'Hara & Dr. Phil"
2020	Sketchy Times with Lilly Singh	Himself (cameo)	First episode

== Discography ==
=== Guest appearances ===
Title	Year	Peak chart positions			Album
Title	Year	US	US R&B/HH	CAN	Album
"Cash Me Outside" (with Bhad Bhabie, featured by DJ Suede the Remix God)	2017	72	30	79	Non-album single
