= Dr. Phil (talk show) =

American tabloid talk show (2002–2023)

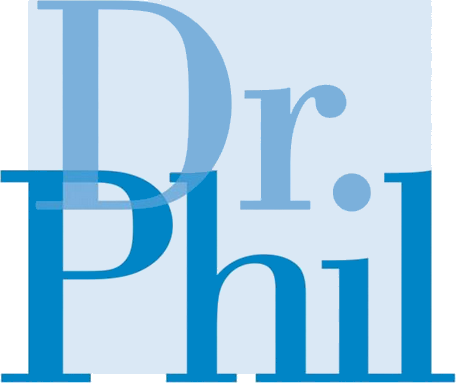
- Genre: Talk show
- Created by: Oprah Winfrey; Phil McGraw
- Presented by: Phil McGraw
- Opening theme: "Shine" by Meredith Brooks used from 2002 to 2008
- Country of origin: United States
- Original language: English
- No. of seasons: 21
- No. of episodes: 3,505

Production
- Executive producers: Carla Pennington; Phil McGraw
- Camera setup: Multiple
- Running time: 41–48 minutes
- Production companies: Stage 29 Productions (2006); Peteski Productions (2005–2023); Paramount Domestic Television (2002–2006); CBS Paramount Domestic Television (2006–2007); CBS Television Distribution (2007–2021); CBS Media Ventures (2021–2023)

Original release
- Network: Syndication; CBS (specials only)
- Release: September 16, 2002 – May 25, 2023

Related
- Dr. Phil Primetime; The Doctors; The Oprah Winfrey Show

Dr. Phil is an American talk show created by Oprah Winfrey and the host Phil McGraw. After McGraw's segments on The Oprah Winfrey Show, Dr. Phil debuted on September 16, 2002. On both shows, McGraw offered advice in the form of "life strategies" from his life experience as a clinical and forensic psychologist. The show was in syndication throughout the United States and several other countries. Occasional prime-time specials aired on CBS.

The executive producers were Phil McGraw and showrunner Oprah Winfrey. It was a production of Peteski Productions and distributed by CBS Media Ventures, with Paramount Domestic Television and its successor, CBS Paramount Domestic Television, serving as secondary co-producers until 2007. It was originally distributed by King World Productions.

The program was recorded before a live studio audience in Stage 29 on the Paramount Pictures lot in Hollywood, California. It was recorded from August to May with a break in December for the holiday season. On October 25, 2018, it was announced that Dr. Phil had been renewed for four additional seasons, taking the show to 2023, or the end of its 21st season, which would be confirmed to be its last in January of that year. The final episode aired on May 25, 2023. Dr. Phil was the longest running Oprah spin-off.

== History ==
The Dr. Phil talk show premiered on September 16, 2002. Before starting the show, McGraw had made regular appearances as a guest on The Oprah Winfrey Show.

From September 2008 to its end, Dr. Phil was broadcast in HDTV with a revamped look and a theme written and performed by McGraw's son, Jordan. Its tenth season premiered on September 12, 2011. Reruns of earlier episodes of the series began broadcasting on the Oprah Winfrey Network in January 2011.

Since 2011, Dr. Phil has ranked as the top syndicated talk show, before that it was the second highest-rated talk show after The Oprah Winfrey Show. In October 2015, it was reported that Dr. Phil had been renewed through 2020.

On October 25, 2018, it was announced that Dr. Phil had been renewed for four additional seasons, for a total of 21 seasons, ending in 2023.

On January 31, 2023, CBS Media Ventures confirmed Dr. Phil would cease production of new episodes with the current season, ending its run at 21 seasons, with the final episode airing on May 25, 2023. The distributor offered a package of 'best-of' reruns a la Judge Judy (another show distributed by CBS Media Ventures) for stations to fulfill the remainder of their contracts, though for the most part, much of its affiliate base refused the package for other current-day programming options, or pushed it to graveyard slots or other sister stations, and in some markets, the reruns air on other stations entirely if not completely refused. On April 2, 2024, McGraw debuted his new show, Dr. Phil Primetime, out of Fort Worth, Texas, on his brand new television network, Merit Street. Dozens of longtime Dr. Phil staffers were reported to have relocated from Los Angeles to Texas to continue working alongside McGraw. The program features more of McGraw's conservative views on education, family values, and immigration.

On February 19, 2025, Peteski Productions (McGraw's production company) announced it was ending its contract deal with CBS Media Ventures to offer the "best of" reruns of Dr. Phil to local stations, effective this fall. Merit Street, later rebranded as Merit TV, became the new exclusive home of all 21 seasons of the show; prior to that point, Merit already had some seasons of Dr. Phil on its streaming platform.

== Controversies ==
McGraw's advice and methods have drawn much criticism from psychotherapists as well as from laypersons. McGraw said in a 2001 Chicago Tribune interview that he never liked traditional one-on-one counseling, and that "I'm not the Hush-Puppies, pipe and 'Let's talk about your mother' kind of psychologist." In 2004, the National Alliance on Mental Illness called McGraw's conduct in one episode of his television show "unethical" and "incredibly irresponsible". McGraw's critics regard advice given by him to be at best simplistic, and at worst, ineffective.

On April 13, 2008, an unnamed staffer for Dr. Phil put up 10%, or a total of $3,300 towards the $33,000 bail for 17-year-old Mercades Nichols, one of a group of eight teenage girls who beat another girl and videotaped the attack. Someone put up the remaining 90% of the bail for Nichols, who had been booked at the Polk County, Florida, jail. Theresa Corigliano, spokesperson for the Dr. Phil show said that "In this case, certain staffers went beyond our guidelines," and that the producers had "decided not to go forward with the story as our guidelines have been compromised."

Shelley Duvall, who was reportedly suffering from mental illness, appeared on a segment on the show in 2016. It drew significant criticism from the public, with many suggesting that Duvall's mental illness was being exploited. In the segment, she refused the offered treatment.

In February 2022, around a dozen current and former employees of Dr. Phil alleged that they experienced "verbal abuse in a workplace that fosters fear, intimidation, and racism". Seven current employees also claimed that the show's guests are often manipulated and treated unethically. Attorneys for McGraw and his co-producer, Carla Pennington, categorically denied every allegation made.

The E! Network program Dirty Rotten Scandals aired an exposé of the series in March 2026. Former guests describe how they felt unsupported after episodes were shot, and in one case claims they were coerced into participating in the program against their will.

== Format ==
The show covered a wide variety of topics including weight loss, financial planning, grief, dysfunctional families, marriage counselling, rebellious teenagers, child stars, and support for charitable causes.

Guests on the show sometimes underwent polygraph tests. These tests were usually administered by retired FBI agent Jack Trimarco, who was a frequent guest on the show until he died in 2018. After Trimarco's death, he was replaced by polygraph examiner John Leo Grogan. McGraw is noted for often bringing families back on multiple shows for follow-up "therapy" sessions in his segment called "Dr. Phil Family."

== Reception ==
=== Ratings ===
On May 21, 2007, the Dr. Phil show was ranked 4th by Nielsen Media Research, with 6.69 million viewers. The show was ranked 6th with 5.69 million viewers on May 12, 2008. In May 2008, Dr. Phil was the second most popular talk show on television, after The Oprah Winfrey Show.

On July 30, 2019, Dr. Phil was the top syndicated show with a 2.9 national Nielsen rating, ranking first among talk shows for the 150th consecutive week. The Dr. Phil show was the highest rated talk show in the first week of March 2020, with a 2.8 national Nielsen rating.

=== Accolades ===
| Year | Award | Category | Nominee | Result |
|---|---|---|---|---|
| 2019 | Daytime Emmy Award | Outstanding Daytime Promotional Announcement | The Dr. Phil show | Nominated |
| 2018 | Daytime Emmy Award | Outstanding Daytime Promotional Announcement | The Dr. Phil show | Nominated |
| 2017 | People's Choice Awards | Favorite Daytime TV Host | The Dr. Phil show | Nominated |
| 2016 | Daytime Emmy Award | Outstanding Daytime Promotional Announcement | The Dr. Phil show | Nominated |
| 2014 | Daytime Emmy Award | Outstanding Talk Show Informative | The Dr. Phil show | Nominated |
| 2014 | People's Choice Awards | Favorite Daytime TV Host | The Dr. Phil show | Nominated |
| 2013 | Daytime Emmy Award | Outstanding Achievement in Main Title and Graphic Design | The Dr. Phil show | Nominated |
| 2013 | Daytime Emmy Award | Outstanding Promotional Announcement | The Dr. Phil show | Nominated |
| 2012 | Daytime Emmy Award | Outstanding Talk Show Informative | The Dr. Phil show | Nominated |
| 2011 | Daytime Emmy Award | Outstanding Talk Show Informative | The Dr. Phil show | Nominated |
| 2010 | Daytime Emmy Award | Outstanding Talk Show Informative | The Dr. Phil show | Nominated |
| 2009 | Daytime Emmy Award | Outstanding Talk Show Informative | The Dr. Phil show | Nominated |
| 2008 | Daytime Emmy Award | Outstanding Talk Show Informative | The Dr. Phil show | Nominated |
| 2008 | PRISM Award | Outstanding Television Talk Show Episode | The Dr. Phil show | Nominated |
| 2007 | PRISM Award | Outstanding Television Talk Show Episode | The Dr. Phil show | Won |
| 2007 | Daytime Emmy Award | Daytime Emmy Award for Outstanding Talk Show | The Dr. Phil show | Nominated |
| 2007 | Daytime Emmy Award | Daytime Emmy Award for Outstanding Talk Show Host | Phil McGraw | Nominated |
| 2006 | Daytime Emmy Award | Daytime Emmy Award for Outstanding Talk Show | The Dr. Phil show | Nominated |
| 2006 | PRISM Award | Outstanding Television Talk Show Episode | The Dr. Phil show | Nominated |
| 2006 | GLAAD Media Award | GLAAD Media Award for Outstanding Talk Show Episode | The Dr. Phil show | Nominated |
| 2005 | Daytime Emmy Award | Daytime Emmy Award for Outstanding Talk Show Host | Phil McGraw | Nominated |
| 2005 | People's Choice Awards | Favorite Daytime TV Host | Phil McGraw | Nominated |
| 2005 | PRISM Award | Outstanding Television Talk Show Episode | The Dr. Phil show | Won |
| 2004 | PRISM Award | PRISM Award | The Dr. Phil show | Nominated |
| 2004 | Daytime Emmy Award | Daytime Emmy Award for Outstanding Talk Show | The Dr. Phil show | Nominated |
| 2004 | Daytime Emmy Award | Daytime Emmy Award for Outstanding Talk Show Host | Phil McGraw | Nominated |
| 2003 | Daytime Emmy Award | Daytime Emmy Award for Outstanding Talk Show | The Dr. Phil show | Nominated |
| 2003 | Daytime Emmy Award | Daytime Emmy Award for Outstanding Talk Show Host | Phil McGraw | Nominated |
