= List of Mississippi State Bulldogs in the NFL draft =

This is a list of Mississippi State Bulldogs football players in the NFL draft.

== Key ==
| B | Back | K | Kicker | NT | Nose tackle |
| C | Center | LB | Linebacker | FB | Fullback |
| DB | Defensive back | P | Punter | LS | Long snapper |
| DE | Defensive end | QB | Quarterback | WR | Wide receiver |
| DT | Defensive tackle | RB | Running back | G | Guard |
| E | End | T | Offensive tackle | TE | Tight end |

== Selections ==
| Year | Round | Pick | Player | Team | Position |
|---|---|---|---|---|---|
| 1937 | 10 | 94 | Chuck Gelatka | New York Giants | E |
| 1940 | 12 | 105 | Shag Goolsby | Cleveland Rams | C |
| 1940 | 17 | 155 | Jack Nix | Cleveland Rams | B |
| 1941 | 6 | 45 | John Tripson | Detroit Lions | T |
| 1941 | 9 | 73 | Ervin Elrod | Pittsburgh Steelers | E |
| 1941 | 12 | 105 | Billy Jefferson | Detroit Lions | B |
| 1941 | 12 | 109 | Harvey Johnson | Brooklyn Dodgers | B |
| 1941 | 14 | 127 | Arnie Moore | New York Giants | E |
| 1941 | 21 | 194 | Hunter Corhern | Chicago Bears | G |
| 1943 | 2 | 13 | John Black | Brooklyn Dodgers | B |
| 1943 | 24 | 230 | Charlie Yancey | Washington Redskins | B |
| 1944 | 2 | 16 | Lamar Blount | New York Giants | B |
| 1944 | 6 | 52 | Hillary Horne | Philadelphia Eagles | T |
| 1944 | 14 | 136 | Bert Corley | New York Giants | C |
| 1944 | 15 | 144 | Billie Murphy | Brooklyn Dodgers | B |
| 1944 | 19 | 189 | Bill Eubank | Detroit Lions | E |
| 1944 | 19 | 192 | Kermit Davis | Green Bay Packers | E |
| 1944 | 21 | 210 | Mike Mihalic | Brooklyn Dodgers | G |
| 1944 | 24 | 251 | Joe Warlick | Cleveland Rams | B |
| 1944 | 28 | 291 | A. B. Howard | Green Bay Packers | E |
| 1944 | 29 | 298 | Marty Frohm | Brooklyn Dodgers | T |
| 1944 | 29 | 306 | John Hughes | Cleveland Rams | E |
| 1945 | 14 | 141 | Stan Rhoades | New York Giants | B |
| 1945 | 19 | 191 | Eagle Matulich | Cleveland Rams | B |
| 1946 | 9 | 75 | Amos Harris | New York Giants | G |
| 1946 | 12 | 106 | Billy Hildebrand | Green Bay Packers | E |
| 1946 | 23 | 219 | Charley Cadenhead | Washington Redskins | C |
| 1947 | 11 | 87 | Al Sidorik | Boston Yanks | T |
| 1948 | 3 | 21 | Dub Garrett | Chicago Bears | T |
| 1948 | 8 | 62 | Shorty McWilliams | Chicago Bears | B |
| 1948 | 32 | 297 | Truett Smith | Chicago Bears | B |
| 1949 | 2 | 16 | Harper Davis | Pittsburgh Steelers | B |
| 1949 | 23 | 222 | R. B. Patterson | Detroit Lions | G |
| 1950 | 7 | 86 | Truett Smith | Pittsburgh Steelers | B |
| 1950 | 17 | 222 | Jerry Taylor | Philadelphia Eagles | C |
| 1950 | 18 | 224 | Jim Champion | New York Bulldogs | T |
| 1950 | 26 | 333 | Jim Pittman | Chicago Cardinals | B |
| 1951 | 22 | 260 | Jack Rucker | Philadelphia Eagles | B |
| 1951 | 24 | 285 | Tony Kotowski | Philadelphia Eagles | E |
| 1951 | 26 | 310 | Billy Stewart | Philadelphia Eagles | B |
| 1952 | 7 | 80 | Joe Fortunato | Chicago Bears | B |
| 1952 | 7 | 84 | John Pace | Cleveland Browns | T |
| 1952 | 12 | 137 | Jack Blount | Philadelphia Eagles | T |
| 1952 | 18 | 208 | Bill Pyron | Chicago Cardinals | T |
| 1953 | 16 | 192 | Ben DeLoe | Los Angeles Rams | T |
| 1953 | 27 | 325 | Jackie Parker | Detroit Lions | B |
| 1953 | 28 | 330 | Joe Cimini | Pittsburgh Steelers | T |
| 1954 | 12 | 143 | Hal Easterwood | San Francisco 49ers | C |
| 1954 | 17 | 196 | Jackie Parker | New York Giants | B |
| 1954 | 28 | 330 | P. W. Underwood | Chicago Bears | G |
| 1956 | 1 | 5 | Art Davis | Pittsburgh Steelers | B |
| 1956 | 21 | 247 | Jim Harness | Baltimore Colts | B |
| 1957 | 13 | 157 | Ron Bennett | New York Giants | E |
| 1958 | 29 | 338 | Ken Irby | Chicago Cardinals | T |
| 1959 | 1 | 3 | Billy Stacy | Chicago Cardinals | B |
| 1959 | 15 | 171 | Jim Poteete | Philadelphia Eagles | C |
| 1961 | 9 | 117 | Bob Bethune | Chicago Bears | B |
| 1961 | 17 | 234 | Tom Goode | Detroit Lions | LB |
| 1962 | 15 | 204 | Ray Osborne | San Francisco 49ers | T |
| 1962 | 18 | 240 | Charlie Furlow | Los Angeles Rams | QB |
| 1963 | 3 | 37 | Johnny Baker | Los Angeles Rams | LB |
| 1963 | 12 | 161 | Bob Benton | San Francisco 49ers | T |
| 1963 | 18 | 247 | Bobby Garvn | Cleveland Browns | T |
| 1964 | 3 | 36 | Ode Burrell | Green Bay Packers | B |
| 1965 | 9 | 115 | Tom Neville | Pittsburgh Steelers | T |
| 1965 | 12 | 167 | Justin Canale | Cleveland Browns | G |
| 1966 | 3 | 41 | Dan Bland | San Francisco 49ers | DB |
| 1966 | 4 | 63 | Hoyle Granger | Baltimore Colts | RB |
| 1966 | 15 | 228 | Grady Bolton | Green Bay Packers | T |
| 1967 | 9 | 236 | Harlan Reed | Green Bay Packers | TE |
| 1967 | 15 | 388 | Tom Folliard | Boston Patriots | LB |
| 1967 | 16 | 394 | Marcus Rhoden | New Orleans Saints | WR |
| 1968 | 6 | 159 | D. D. Lewis | Dallas Cowboys | LB |
| 1968 | 13 | 340 | George Barron | Philadelphia Eagles | T |
| 1970 | 13 | 320 | Jack Thomas | St. Louis Cardinals | G |
| 1971 | 11 | 283 | Joe Reed | San Francisco 49ers | QB |
| 1971 | 13 | 325 | Sammy Milner | San Diego Chargers | WR |
| 1971 | 16 | 404 | Dave Smith | Cleveland Browns | WR |
| 1973 | 2 | 50 | Ken Phares | Pittsburgh Steelers | DB |
| 1973 | 16 | 392 | Frank Dowsing | Philadelphia Eagles | DB |
| 1974 | 6 | 137 | Wayne Jones | New York Jets | RB |
| 1974 | 11 | 267 | William Buckley | New York Jets | WR |
| 1974 | 14 | 343 | Greg Fountain | New York Jets | G |
| 1975 | 1 | 10 | Jimmy Webb | San Francisco 49ers | DT |
| 1975 | 5 | 117 | Steve Freeman | New England Patriots | DB |
| 1975 | 10 | 245 | Rockey Felker | Cincinnati Bengals | DB |
| 1976 | 2 | 55 | Jim Eidson | Dallas Cowboys | G |
| 1976 | 7 | 207 | Larry Buie | Los Angeles Rams | DB |
| 1976 | 11 | 302 | Chuck Brislin | Atlanta Falcons | T |
| 1977 | 4 | 100 | Stan Black | San Francisco 49ers | DB |
| 1977 | 8 | 203 | Walter Packer | Atlanta Falcons | WR |
| 1977 | 10 | 262 | Harvey Hull | Houston Oilers | LB |
| 1977 | 11 | 303 | Ray Costict | New England Patriots | LB |
| 1978 | 3 | 59 | Dennis Johnson | Buffalo Bills | RB |
| 1978 | 5 | 133 | Bruce Threadgill | San Francisco 49ers | DB |
| 1978 | 11 | 290 | Larry Gillard | Cleveland Browns | DT |
| 1979 | 7 | 180 | Henry Monroe | Green Bay Packers | DB |
| 1979 | 9 | 240 | Ezra Tate | Seattle Seahawks | RB |
| 1979 | 10 | 253 | Dave Marler | Buffalo Bills | QB |
| 1979 | 10 | 260 | Gerald Jackson | Kansas City Chiefs | DB |
| 1980 | 3 | 80 | James Jones | Dallas Cowboys | RB |
| 1980 | 5 | 137 | Kenny Johnson | Atlanta Falcons | DB |
| 1981 | 2 | 39 | Mardye McDole | Minnesota Vikings | WR |
| 1981 | 5 | 113 | Tyrone Keys | New York Jets | DE |
| 1981 | 11 | 294 | Willie Jackson | Detroit Lions | DB |
| 1981 | 11 | 298 | Larry Friday | Cleveland Browns | DB |
| 1982 | 1 | 2 | Johnie Cooks | Baltimore Colts | LB |
| 1982 | 1 | 26 | Glen Collins | Cincinnati Bengals | DE |
| 1982 | 10 | 262 | Curtis Stowers | Atlanta Falcons | LB |
| 1983 | 1 | 8 | Michael Haddix | Philadelphia Eagles | RB |
| 1983 | 3 | 62 | Glen Young | Philadelphia Eagles | WR |
| 1984 | 4 | 103 | George Wonsley | Indianapolis Colts | RB |
| 1984u | 1 | 26 | Danny Knight | Miami Dolphins | WR |
| 1984u | 3 | 77 | John Bond | Cleveland Browns | QB |
| 1986 | 11 | 284 | Pat Swoopes | New Orleans Saints | DT |
| 1986 | 11 | 285 | Aaron Pearson | Kansas City Chiefs | LB |
| 1987 | 2 | 51 | Don Smith | Tampa Bay Buccaneers | RB |
| 1987 | 5 | 129 | Kirby Jackson | New York Jets | DB |
| 1987 | 9 | 250 | Bruce Plummer | Denver Broncos | C |
| 1987 | 10 | 270 | Louis Clark | Seattle Seahawks | WR |
| 1988 | 7 | 192 | Gary Frank | Denver Broncos | G |
| 1989 | 8 | 213 | Fred Hadley | New Orleans Saints | WR |
| 1989 | 10 | 264 | Anthony Butts | Denver Broncos | DT |
| 1990 | 4 | 87 | Jesse Anderson | Tampa Bay Buccaneers | TE |
| 1990 | 6 | 158 | James Williams | New Orleans Saints | LB |
| 1991 | 5 | 116 | Robert Young | Los Angeles Rams | DE |
| 1991 | 9 | 250 | Jerry Bouldin | New York Giants | WR |
| 1992 | 4 | 96 | Keo Coleman | New York Jets | LB |
| 1992 | 8 | 215 | Nate Williams | Pittsburgh Steelers | DT |
| 1993 | 4 | 108 | Kevin Henry | Pittsburgh Steelers | DE |
| 1993 | 5 | 125 | Olanda Truitt | Los Angeles Raiders | WR |
| 1993 | 5 | 140 | Marc Woodard | Pittsburgh Steelers | LB |
| 1993 | 7 | 195 | Willie Harris | Buffalo Bills | WR |
| 1994 | 5 | 142 | Herman Carroll | New Orleans Saints | DE |
| 1995 | 2 | 59 | Kendell Watkins | Dallas Cowboys | TE |
| 1995 | 2 | 62 | Jesse James | St. Louis Rams | G |
| 1995 | 4 | 106 | Melvin Hayes | New York Jets | T |
| 1995 | 6 | 208 | Fred McCrary | Jacksonville Jaguars | RB |
| 1995 | 7 | 210 | Kevin Bouie | Philadelphia Eagles | RB |
| 1995 | 7 | 224 | Wesley Leasy | Arizona Cardinals | LB |
| 1996 | 1 | 13 | Walt Harris | Chicago Bears | DB |
| 1996 | 1 | 24 | Eric Moulds | Buffalo Bills | WR |
| 1997 | 3 | 96 | Brent Smith | Miami Dolphins | T |
| 1997 | 4 | 102 | Terry Day | New York Jets | DE |
| 1998 | 2 | 61 | Eric Brown | Denver Broncos | DB |
| 1998 | 3 | 68 | Robert Hicks | Buffalo Bills | T |
| 1998 | 4 | 120 | Greg Favors | Kansas City Chiefs | LB |
| 1999 | 2 | 39 | J. J. Johnson | Miami Dolphins | RB |
| 1999 | 2 | 42 | Reggie Kelly | Atlanta Falcons | TE |
| 1999 | 2 | 57 | Randy Thomas | New York Jets | G |
| 1999 | 6 | 206 | Dennis McKinley | Arizona Cardinals | RB |
| 2000 | 4 | 120 | Alvin McKinley | Carolina Panthers | DT |
| 2000 | 5 | 133 | Robert Bean | Cincinnati Bengals | DB |
| 2000 | 6 | 190 | John Hilliard | Seattle Seahawks | DT |
| 2000 | 7 | 237 | Wes Shivers | Tennessee Titans | T |
| 2001 | 2 | 45 | Fred Smoot | Washington Redskins | DB |
| 2001 | 3 | 93 | Willie Blade | Dallas Cowboys | DT |
| 2001 | 4 | 128 | Floyd Womack | Seattle Seahawks | G |
| 2001 | 6 | 183 | Ellis Wyms | Tampa Bay Buccaneers | DE |
| 2002 | 3 | 96 | Dorsett Davis | Denver Broncos | DT |
| 2003 | 4 | 121 | Justin Griffith | Atlanta Falcons | RB |
| 2003 | 5 | 156 | Donald Lee | Miami Dolphins | TE |
| 2003 | 7 | 228 | Mario Haggan | Buffalo Bills | LB |
| 2005 | 4 | 113 | David Stewart | Tennessee Titans | T |
| 2005 | 5 | 137 | Ronald Fields | San Francisco 49ers | DT |
| 2006 | 3 | 79 | Jerious Norwood | Atlanta Falcons | RB |
| 2007 | 5 | 152 | Antonio Johnson | Tennessee Titans | DT |
| 2010 | 6 | 173 | Anthony Dixon | San Francisco 49ers | RB |
| 2010 | 7 | 220 | Jamar Chaney | Philadelphia Eagles | LB |
| 2011 | 1 | 32 | Derek Sherrod | Green Bay Packers | T |
| 2011 | 4 | 99 | K. J. Wright | Seattle Seahawks | LB |
| 2011 | 5 | 165 | Pernell McPhee | Baltimore Ravens | DE |
| 2011 | 6 | 169 | Chris White | Buffalo Bills | LB |
| 2012 | 1 | 12 | Fletcher Cox | Philadelphia Eagles | DT |
| 2012 | 5 | 170 | Vick Ballard | Indianapolis Colts | RB |
| 2012 | 6 | 192 | Charles Mitchell | Atlanta Falcons | DB |
| 2013 | 2 | 36 | Darius Slay | Detroit Lions | DB |
| 2013 | 2 | 43 | Johnthan Banks | Tampa Bay Buccaneers | DB |
| 2013 | 5 | 167 | Josh Boyd | Green Bay Packers | DE |
| 2014 | 3 | 81 | Gabe Jackson | Oakland Raiders | G |
| 2015 | 2 | 38 | Preston Smith | Washington Redskins | DE |
| 2015 | 2 | 43 | Benardrick McKinney | Houston Texans | LB |
| 2015 | 6 | 178 | Matthew Wells | New England Patriots | LB |
| 2015 | 6 | 195 | Malcolm Johnson | Cleveland Browns | TE |
| 2015 | 6 | 205 | Josh Robinson | Indianapolis Colts | RB |
| 2016 | 2 | 37 | Chris Jones | Kansas City Chiefs | DT |
| 2016 | 3 | 68 | Will Redmond | San Francisco 49ers | DB |
| 2016 | 4 | 135 | Dak Prescott | Dallas Cowboys | QB |
| 2017 | 6 | 210 | Justin Senior | Seattle Seahawks | T |
| 2018 | 3 | 80 | Martinas Rankin | Houston Texans | T |
| 2018 | 6 | 211 | Jordan Thomas | Houston Texans | TE |
| 2018 | 7 | 239 | Hunter Bradley | Green Bay Packers | LS |
| 2018 | 7 | 247 | Logan Cooke | Jacksonville Jaguars | P |
| 2019 | 1 | 19 | Jeffery Simmons | Tennessee Titans | DT |
| 2019 | 1 | 26 | Montez Sweat | Washington Redskins | DE |
| 2019 | 1 | 27 | Johnathan Abram | Oakland Raiders | DB |
| 2019 | 2 | 44 | Elgton Jenkins | Green Bay Packers | C |
| 2019 | 6 | 199 | Gerri Green | Indianapolis Colts | DE |
| 2020 | 2 | 63 | Willie Gay | Kansas City Chiefs | LB |
| 2020 | 3 | 89 | Cameron Dantzler | Minnesota Vikings | DB |
| 2020 | 3 | 106 | Tyre Phillips | Baltimore Ravens | T |
| 2020 | 7 | 240 | Tommy Stevens | New Orleans Saints | QB |
| 2020 | 7 | 249 | Brian Cole II | Minnesota Vikings | LB |
| 2021 | 7 | 253 | Marquiss Spencer | Denver Broncos | DE |
| 2021 | 7 | 256 | Kylin Hill | Green Bay Packers | RB |
| 2022 | 1 | 9 | Charles Cross | Seattle Seahawks | T |
| 2022 | 3 | 68 | Martin Emerson | Cleveland Browns | DB |
| 2023 | 1 | 16 | Emmanuel Forbes | Washington Commanders | DB |
| 2023 | 4 | 123 | Cameron Young | Seattle Seahawks | DT |
| 2024 | 4 | 112 | Decamerion Richardson | Las Vegas Raiders | DB |
| 2024 | 6 | 200 | Jaden Crumedy | Carolina Panthers | DT |
| 2024 | 6 | 206 | Nathaniel Watson | Cleveland Browns | LB |
| 2026 | 4 | 105 | Brenen Thompson | Los Angeles Chargers | WR |
| 2026 | 5 | 180 | Seydou Traore | Miami Dolphins | TE |
