= 1976 All-America college football team =

Official list of the best college football players of 1976

The 1976 All-America college football team is composed of college football players who were selected as All-Americans by various organizations and writers that chose College Football All-America Teams in 1976. The National Collegiate Athletic Association (NCAA) recognizes four selectors as "official" for the 1976 season. They are: (1) the American Football Coaches Association (AFCA); (2) the Associated Press (AP) selected based on the votes of sports writers at AP newspapers; (3) the Football Writers Association of America (FWAA) selected by the nation's football writers; and (4) the United Press International (UPI) selected based on the votes of sports writers at UPI newspapers. Other selectors included Football News (FN), the Newspaper Enterprise Association (NEA), The Sporting News (TSN), and the Walter Camp Football Foundation (WC).

Three players were unanimously selected by all four official selectors and all five unofficial selectors. They were running backs Tony Dorsett of Pittsburgh and Ricky Bell of USC and defensive end Ross Browner of Notre Dame.

The 1976 USC Trojans football team led all others with five players who received first-team All-American honors in 1976. In addition to Ricky Bell, the USC honorees were offensive tackle Marvin Powell, defensive end Dennis Thurman, defensive tackle Gary Jeter, and punter Glen Walker. The consensus national champion Pittsburgh Panthers team had two first-team honorees: Tony Dorsett and middle guard Al Romano.

== Consensus All-Americans ==
The following charts identify the NCAA-recognized consensus All-Americans for the year 1976 and displays which first-team designations they received.

=== Offense ===
Name	Position	School	Number	Official	Other
Tony Dorsett	Running back	Pittsburgh	4/5/9	AFCA, AP, FWAA, UPI	CFN, FN, NEA, TSN, WC
Ricky Bell	Running back	USC	4/5/9	AFCA, AP, FWAA, UPI	CFN, FN, NEA, TSN, WC
Joel Parrish	Offensive guard	Georgia	3/4/8	AFCA, FWAA, UPI	FN, NEA, TSN, WC
Rob Lytle	Running back	Michigan	3/5/8	AFCA, AP, UPI	CFN, FN, NEA, TSN, WC
Larry Seivers	Wide receiver	Tennessee	3/4/7	AFCA, AP, UPI	CFN, NEA, TSN, WC
Mike Vaughan	Offensive tackle	Oklahoma	4/2/6	AFCA, AP, FWAA, UPI	FN, WC
Ken MacAfee	Tight end	Notre Dame	3/3/6	AFCA, FWAA, UPI	CFN, NEA, WC
Tommy Kramer	Quarterback	Rice	3/2/5	AFCA, AP, UPI	CFN, WC
Mark Donahue	Offensive guard	Michigan	2/3/5	FWAA, UPI	FN, NEA, WC
Derrel Gofourth	Center	Oklahoma State	2/1/3	AFCA, UPI	FN
Chris Ward	Offensive tackle	Ohio State	1/0/1	AFCA	--

=== Defense ===
Name	Position	School	Number	Official	Other
Ross Browner	Defensive end	Notre Dame	4/5/9	AFCA, AP, FWAA, UPI	CFN, FN, NEA, TSN, WC
Bill Armstrong	Defensive back	Wake Forest	4/3/7	AFCA, AP, FWAA, UPI	FN, TSN, WC
Robert Jackson	Linebacker	Texas A&M	4/3/7	AFCA, AP, FWAA, UPI	FN, TSN, WC
Dave Butterfield	Defensive back	Nebraska	3/4/7	AFCA, AP, UPI	CFN, FN, NEA WC
Bob Brudzinski	Defensive end	Ohio State	3/2/6	AFCA, AP, FWAA	CFN, TSN, WC
Al Romano	Middle guard	Pittsburgh	3/3/6	AFCA, AP, UPI	CFN, NEA, WC
Gary Green	Defensive back	Baylor	2/4/6	AFCA, AP	CFN, NEA, TSN
Wilson Whitley	Defensive tackle	Houston	3/2/5	AFCA, AP, FWAA	FN, WC
Joe Campbell	Defensive tackle	Maryland	2/2/4	AFCA, FWAA	CFN, NEA, TSN
Gary Jeter	Defensive tackle	USC	2/1/3	FWAA, UPI	NEA
Jerry Robinson	Linebacker	UCLA	2/1/3	AP, FWAA	NEA
Dennis Thurman	Defensive back	USC	2/1/3	AP, FWAA	WC

== Offense ==
=== Receivers ===
- Larry Seivers, Tennessee (AFCA, AP-1, UPI-1, NEA-1, WC, TSN, CFN)
- Jim Smith, Michigan (AP-1, UPI-2, TSN, FN, NEA-2)
- Wes Chandler, Florida (AP-3, FN, NEA-1)
- Luther Blue, Iowa State (AP-3, FWAA)
- Jim Corbett, Pittsburgh (AP-2)
- Billy Ryckman, Louisiana Tech (AP-2)
- Tony Hill, Stanford (NEA-2)

=== Tight end ===
- Ken MacAfee, Notre Dame (AFCA, FWAA, UPI-1, CFN, NEA-1 WC)
- Clennie Brundidge, Army (UPI-2)
- Don Hasselbeck, Colorado (NEA-2, TSN)

=== Tackles ===
- Mike Vaughan, Oklahoma (AFCA, AP-1, FWAA, UPI-1, WC, FN)
- Chris Ward, Ohio State (AFCA [g], AP-2, UPI-2)
- Warren Bryant, Kentucky (AFCA, AP-2, TSN, CFN, NEA-2, WC)
- Marvin Powell, USC (AP-3, UPI-1, TSN, FN)
- Morris Towns, Missouri (NEA-1, CFN)
- Mike Wilson, Georgia, (AP-1, UPI-2, NEA-1)
- Val Belcher, Houston (NEA-2)
- Steve August, Tulsa (AP-3)

=== Guards ===
- Mark Donahue, Michigan (FWAA, UPI-1, NEA-1, WC, FN)
- Joel Parrish, Georgia (AFCA, AP-3, FWAA, UPI-1, FN, NEA-2, TSN, WC)
- Steve Schindler, Boston College (AP-2, FWAA, NEA-1, TSN, CFN)
- Ted Albrecht, California (AP-1)
- T.J. Humphreys, Arkansas State (AP-1)
- Bill Dufek, Michigan (CFN)
- Tom Brzoza, Pittsburgh (AP-2, UPI-2)
- Donnie Hickman, USC (UPI-2, NEA-2)
- Mitch Hoban, Ball State (AP-3)

=== Centers ===
- Derrel Gofourth, Oklahoma St. (AFCA, UPI-1, FN)
- Billy Bryan, Duke (AP-2, FWAA, WC)
- John Yarno, Idaho (AP-1)
- R. C. Thielemann, Arkansas (NEA-1)
- Bob Rush, Memphis State (NEA-2, TSN)
- Mitch Kahn, UCLA (CFN)
- Leo Tierney, Georgia Tech (AP-3, UPI-2)

=== Quarterbacks ===
- Tommy Kramer, Rice (AFCA, AP-1, UPI-1, WC, CFN)
- Gifford Nielsen, BYU (AP-2, FWAA, UPI-2)
- Vince Ferragamo, Nebraska (AP-3, FN)
- Joe Roth, California (TSN)
- Jeff Dankworth, UCLA (NEA-1)
- Mark Manges, Maryland (NEA-2)

=== Running backs ===
- Tony Dorsett, Pittsburgh (AFCA, AP-1, FWAA, UPI-1, CFN, FN, NEA-1, TSN, WC)
- Ricky Bell, USC (AFCA, AP-1, FWAA, UPI-1, CFN, FN, NEA-1, TSN, WC)
- Rob Lytle, Michigan (AFCA, AP-1, UPI-1, CFN, FN, NEA-2, WC)
- Terry Miller, Oklahoma State (AP-1, FWAA, UPI-2, NEA-2)
- Wendell Tyler, UCLA ()
- Scott Dierking, Purdue (AP-2)
- Tony Reed, Colorado (AP-2)
- Mike Voight, North Carolina (AP-2, UPI-2)
- Pete Johnson, Ohio State (UPI-2)
- Andre Herrera, Southern Illinois (AP-3)
- Derrick Jensen, Texas-Arlington (AP-3)
- Jerome Persell, Western Michigan (AP-3)

== Defense ==
=== Defensive ends ===
- Ross Browner, Notre Dame (AFCA, AP-1, FWAA, UPI-1, CFN, FN, NEA-1, TSN, WC)
- Bob Brudzinski, Ohio State (AFCA, AP-1, FWAA, UPI-2, CFN, NEA-2, TSN [LB])
- Mike Butler, Kansas (NEA-1 [DT], TSN [DT], FN)
- Duncan McColl, Stanford (AP-2, UPI-1, CFN, WC)
- Robin Cole, New Mexico (AP-3, UPI-2, NEA-2 [LB])
- Nate Toran, Rutgers (AP-2)
- Phil Dokes, Oklahoma State (NEA-2)
- Cary Godette, East Carolina (AP-3)

=== Defensive tackles ===
- Joe Campbell, Maryland (AFCA, AP-2, FWAA, UPI-2, CFN, NEA-1, TSN [DE])
- Wilson Whitley, Houston (AFCA, AP-1, FWAA, FN, NEA-2, WC)
- Gary Jeter, Southern California (AP-2, FWAA, UPI-1, NEA-1 [DE])
- Mike Fultz, Nebraska (UPI-1, FN, NEA-2, TSN, WC)
- Eddie Edwards, Miami (Fla.) (AP-1)
- Phil Dokes, Oklahoma State (AP-3, CFN)
- Nick Buonamici, Ohio State (UPI-2)
- Wilson Faumuina, San Jose State (AP-3)

=== Middle guards ===
- Al Romano, Pittsburgh (AFCA, AP-1, UPI-1, FN, NEA-1, WC)
- Gary Don Johnson, Baylor (AP-2)
- Mike Stensrud, Iowa State (NEA-2)
- Harvey Hull, Mississippi State (UPI-2)
- Jeff Sapp, Navy (AP-3)

=== Linebackers ===
- Robert Jackson, Texas A&M (AFCA, AP-1, FWAA, UPI-1, FN, NEA-1, TSN, WC)
- Jerry Robinson, UCLA (AP-1, FWAA, NEA-1)
- Thomas Howard, Texas Tech (AFCA, AP-2, CFN, WC)
- Calvin O'Neal, Michigan (AP-2, UPI-1, CFN, TSN, WC)
- Brian Ruff, The Citadel (AP-1, UPI-2)
- Kurt Allerman, Penn State (AP-3, UPI-1)
- Gary Spani, Kansas State (FN)
- Paul Nunu, Wyoming (FN)
- Clete Pillen, Nebraska (AP-2, UPI-2)
- Scott Studwell, Illinois (AP-3, NEA-2)
- Dave Lewis, USC (UPI-2)
- Ray Costict, Mississippi State (AP-3)

=== Defensive backs ===
- Bill Armstrong, Wake Forest (AFCA, AP-1, FWAA, UPI-1, FN, TSN, WC)
- Dave Butterfield, Nebraska (AFCA, AP-3, UPI-1, CFN, FN, NEA-1, WC)
- Gary Green, Baylor (AFCA, AP-1, UPI-2, CFN, NEA-1, TSN)
- Dennis Thurman, USC (AP-1, FWAA, UPI-2, WC)
- Oscar Edwards, UCLA (AFCA, UPI-1)
- Luther Bradley, Notre Dame (FN, NEA-2, WC)
- Mike Davis, Colorado (NEA-1)
- Stan Black, Mississippi State (AP-2, NEA-1)
- Lester Hayes, Texas A&M (TSN)
- Eric Harris, Memphis State (CFN)
- Raymond Clayborn, Texas (NEA-2, TSN)
- Zac Henderson, Oklahoma (AP-2)
- Jimmy Stewart, Tulsa (AP-2)
- Jim Bolding, East Carolina (NEA-2)
- Ray Griffin, Ohio State (UPI-2, NEA-2)
- Bob Jury, Pittsburgh (AP-3)
- Jeff Nixon, Richmond (AP-3)

== Special teams ==
=== Kickers ===
- Tony Franklin, Texas A&M (FWAA, UPI-1, CFN, NEA-2)
- Steve Little, Arkansas (AFCA)
- Neil O'Donoghue, Auburn (TSN)
- Carson Long, Pittsburgh (UPI-2)

=== Punters ===
- Tom Skladany, Ohio State (CFN, NEA-1 [placekicker], TSN)
- Russell Erxleben, Texas (FWAA, NEA-2)
- Glen Walker, Southern California (NEA-1)

=== Returner ===
- Jim Smith, Michigan (FWAA)

== Key ==
- **Bold** – Consensus All-American
- -1 – First-team selection
- -2 – Second-team selection
- -3 – Third-team selection

=== Official selectors ===
- AFCA – American Football Coaches Association
- AP – Associated Press
- FWAA – Football Writers Association of America
- UPI – United Press International

=== Other selectors ===
- CFN – College Football News (Tom Harmon)
- FN – Football News
- NEA – Newspaper Enterprise Association
- TSN – The Sporting News
- WC – Walter Camp Football Foundation

== See also ==
- 1976 All-Atlantic Coast Conference football team
- 1976 All-Big Eight Conference football team
- 1976 All-Big Ten Conference football team
- 1976 All-Pacific-8 Conference football team
- 1976 All-SEC football team
- 1976 All-Southwest Conference football team
