= 1975 All-SEC football team =

American college football all-star team

The 1975 All-SEC football team consists of American football players selected to the All-Southeastern Conference (SEC) chosen by various selectors for the 1975 NCAA Division I football season. Alabama won the conference.

== Offensive selections ==
=== Receivers ===
- Larry Seivers, Tennessee (AP-1, UPI)
- Rick Kimbrough, Ole Miss (AP-2)
- Jeff Gilligan, Auburn (AP-2)

=== Tight ends ===
- Barry Burton, Vanderbilt (AP-1, UPI)
- Tommy West, Tennessee (AP-2)

=== Tackles ===
- Warren Bryant, Kentucky (AP-1, UPI)
- Mike Williams, Florida (AP-1, UPI)
- Mike Wilson, Georgia (AP-2)
- Chuck Fletcher, Auburn (AP-2)

=== Guards ===
- Randy Johnson, Georgia (AP-1, UPI)
- David Gerasimchuk, Alabama (AP-1)
- Mickey Marvin, Tennessee (UPI)
- Gerald Loper, Florida (AP-2)
- Sam Nichols, Miss. St. (AP-2)

=== Centers ===
- Richard Keys, Miss. St. (AP-1, UPI)
- Robbie Moore, Florida (AP-2)

=== Quarterbacks ===
- Richard Todd, Alabama (AP-1, UPI)
- Don Gaffney, Florida (AP-2)

=== Running backs ===
- Jimmy DuBose, Florida (AP-1, UPI)
- Sonny Collins, Kentucky (AP-1, UPI)
- Glynn Harrison, Georgia (AP-1, UPI)
- Walter Packer, Miss. St. (AP-2)
- Johnny Davis, Alabama (AP-2)
- Stanley Morgan, Tennessee (AP-2)
- Kevin McLee, Georgia (AP-2)

== Defensive selections ==
=== Ends ===
- Leroy Cook, Alabama (AP-1, UPI)
- Ken Bordelon, LSU (AP-1)
- Ron McCartney, Tennessee (AP-2, UPI)
- Gary Turner, Ole Miss (AP-2)

=== Tackles ===
- Steve Cassidy, LSU (AP-1, UPI)
- Bob Baumhower, Alabama (AP-1, UPI)
- Rick Telhieard, Auburn (AP-1)
- Darrell Carpenter, Florida (AP-2)
- Lawrence Johnson, Ole Miss (AP-2)

=== Middle guards ===
- Ben Williams, Ole Miss (AP-1, UPI)
- Harvey Hull, Miss. St. (AP-2)

=== Linebackers ===
- Conley Duncan, Alabama (AP-1, UPI)
- Sammy Green, Florida (AP-1, UPI)
- Andy Spiva, Tennessee (AP-1)
- Woody Lowe, Alabama (UPI)
- Ben Zambiasi, Georgia (AP-2)
- Jim Kovach, Kentucky (AP-2)
- Ray Costict, Miss. St. (AP-2)

=== Backs ===
- Jay Chesley, Vanderbilt (AP-1, UPI)
- Mike Mauck, Tennessee (AP-1)
- Wayne Rhodes, Alabama (AP-1)
- Tyrone King, Alabama (UPI)
- Alan Pizzitola, Alabama (UPI)
- Henry Davis, Florida (AP-2)
- Bill Krug, Georgia (AP-2)
- Stan Black, Miss. St. (AP-2)

== Special teams ==
=== Kicker ===
- David Posey, Florida (AP-1)
- Mark Adams, Vanderbilt (AP-2)

=== Punter ===
- Clyde Baumgartner, Auburn (AP-1)
- Bill Farris, Ole Miss (AP-2)

== Key ==
AP = Associated Press

UPI = United Press International

Bold = Consensus first-team selection by both AP and UPI

== See also ==
- 1975 College Football All-America Team
