= Stanley Morgan =

American football player (born 1955)

No. 86
- Position: Wide receiver

Personal information
- Born: February 17, 1955 (age 71); Easley, South Carolina, U.S.
- Listed height: 5 ft 11 in (1.80 m)
- Listed weight: 181 lb (82 kg)

Career information
- High school: Easley
- College: Tennessee
- NFL draft: 1977: 1st round, 25th overall pick

Career history
- New England Patriots (1977–1989); Indianapolis Colts (1990); Denver Broncos (1992)*
- * Offseason or practice squad member only

Awards and highlights
- 2× Second-team All-Pro (1980, 1986); 4× Pro Bowl (1979, 1980, 1986, 1987); NFL receiving touchdowns leader (1979); New England Patriots All-1970s Team; New England Patriots All-1980s Team; New England Patriots 35th Anniversary Team; New England Patriots 50th Anniversary Team; New England Patriots Hall of Fame; 2× First-team All-SEC (1974, 1976); Second-team All-SEC (1975)

Career NFL statistics
- Receptions: 557
- Receiving yards: 10,716
- Yards per reception: 19.2
- Receiving touchdowns: 72
- Stats at Pro Football Reference

Stanley Douglas Morgan (born February 17, 1955) is an American former professional football player who was a wide receiver in the National Football League (NFL) for the New England Patriots and Indianapolis Colts. A "deep threat" receiver, he holds the NFL record (among receivers with at least 500 catches) with 19.2 yards per catch, and also holds the Patriots team record for total receiving yards in a career.

A four-time Pro Bowl selection and two-time All-Pro, he was selected to the New England Patriots team Hall of Fame, the team's highest honor, in 2007. Morgan was named to the New England Patriots 1970s and 1980s All Decade Teams.

In 2021, the Professional Football Researchers Association named Morgan to the PFRA Hall of Very Good Class of 2021.

== Early life ==
Morgan played high school football at Easley High School in Easley, South Carolina. In 1972, his team won a state championship.

== College career ==
Morgan went on to play college football for the University of Tennessee, where he was an outstanding multi-position player, appearing in all 46 Volunteers games in his four-year career. As a freshman in 1973, he was used primarily as a wide receiver with 22 receptions for 522 yards and four touchdowns. In his breakthrough sophomore season, he had 128 rushes for 723 yards and 11 touchdowns, 10 catches for 234 and two touchdowns, and 29 punt returns including one touchdown, for an SEC-leading 84 points. He made the All-SEC team in 1974 as a wide receiver (UPI) and a running back (AP2). His junior year, Morgan was used as a running back (133 carries for 809 yards and 8 touchdowns) and also a kick returner. In a game against Maryland he scored three touchdowns, including a 50-yard run and 70-yard punt return. He also became the first Volunteer to rush for 200 yards in a game with 201 against Hawaii. His senior year, he balanced his time more, finishing second on the team in both rushing (90 carries for 388 yards and 9 touchdowns to Bobby Emmons' 462) and receiving (14 catches for 317 yards and 2 touchdowns to Larry Seivers 737). He had 201 yards receiving against TCU, the second most at the time. His 11 touchdowns that season placed Morgan second in the SEC to LSU's Terry Robiskie, and earned him 1976 All-SEC honors as a running back (AP) and receiver (UPI).

He holds the all-purpose yards record for the University of Tennessee, which stands at 4,642, and led Tennessee in that category all four seasons. He shares the modern record for career touchdowns with 39, his 28 rushing touchdowns is third all-time, and his 1,615 combined return yards is 5th. Morgan was inducted into the University of Tennessee Hall of Fame in 2000.

Morgan was also a member of the Tennessee Volunteers track and field team as a sprinter.

== Professional career ==
Morgan was selected by the New England Patriots in the first round of the 1977 NFL draft (25th overall). Despite being used primarily as a running back after his freshman year, Morgan's exceptional speed helped him transition back to wide receiver. In his rookie season, he had 21 receptions for 443 yards and three touchdowns. In the third quarter of a Week 12 game against the Baltimore Colts in the 1979 season, he had an 80-yard punt return for a touchdown in the 50–21 win. He averaged over 20 yards per reception his first six seasons, with a career-high and franchise-record 24.1 yards per reception in 1978. He led the NFL in yards per reception in 1979, 1980 and 1981, and ended his career with the three best seasons in that category for a Patriots receiver (and six of the top 12). In a 1978 game against the Baltimore Colts, Morgan had five receptions for a franchise-record 170 yards; he broke his own record in 1981 against the Miami Dolphins with five receptions for 182 yards, a mark that stood for 17 years.

Morgan led the NFL in receiving touchdowns in 1979 with a then-franchise record 12. Morgan topped 1,000 receiving yards a then franchise-record three times (1979, 1981 & 1986). His best season as a Patriot was 1986 when he caught 84 passes for a then-franchise-record 1,491 yards and 10 touchdowns, leading the Patriots to the AFC East title. Morgan appeared in four Pro Bowls (1979, 1980, 1986 & 1987) and was selected 2nd Team All-Pro in 1980 and 1986. Morgan was a member of the 1985 AFC Champion New England Patriots, and caught six passes for 51 yards in Super Bowl XX, a 46–10 loss to the Chicago Bears. In Week 3 of the 1986 season, Morgan had seven receptions for 161 yards and a career-high three touchdowns in a 38–31 loss to the Seattle Seahawks. In the following season's Divisional Round, he had three receptions for 100 yards and two touchdowns in a 22–17 loss to the Denver Broncos. After 13 seasons with New England, he was signed by the Indianapolis where he played just one season. He finished his final NFL season with 23 receptions for 364 yards and five touchdowns. At the time, he held the franchise record in every receiving category with 534 catches (now fourth to Wes Welker, Julian Edelman and Troy Brown) for 10,352 yards (still the franchise record) and 67 touchdowns. (now second to Rob Gronkowski). He also has the franchise record with 38 games with 100+ receiving yards, 10,479 yards from scrimmage, and is second to Kevin Faulk with 11,471 all-purpose yards. He finished his career with 557 receptions for 10,716 yards (19.2 yards per catch) and 72 touchdowns (solidly in the all-time NFL top 100 in all four categories), along with 127 rushing yards and 989 combined return yards.

Morgan was inducted into the New England Patriots Hall of Fame in 2007.

In 2021, The Athletic named him the best #25 pick since the AFL-NFL merger, and noted that many of his teammates were rankled by his absence from the Pro Football Hall of Fame despite having more receiving yards and receiving touchdowns than many of his contemporaries.

== Career statistics ==
=== NFL ===
Legend
	NFL record
	Led the league
**Bold**	Career high

Year	Team	GP	Receiving					Rushing			Punt Ret.			Kickoff Ret.			Total Yds
Year	Team	GP	Rec	Yds	Avg	Lng	TD	Att	Yds	TD	Ret	Yds	TD	Ret	Yds	TD	Total Yds
1977	NE	14	21	443	21.1	64	3	1	10	0	16	220	0	—	—	—	673
1978	NE	**16**	34	820	**24.1**	75	5	2	11	0	**32**	**335**	0	**1**	**17**	0	1,183
1979	NE	**16**	44	1,002	22.8	63	**12**	**7**	**39**	0	29	289	**1**	**1**	12	0	1,342
1980	NE	**16**	45	991	22.0	71	6	4	36	0	—	—	—	—	—	—	1,027
1981	NE	13	44	1,029	23.4	**76**	6	2	21	0	15	116	0	—	—	—	1,166
1982	NE	9	28	584	20.9	75	3	2	3	0	—	—	—	—	—	—	587
1983	NE	**16**	58	863	14.9	50	2	1	13	0	—	—	—	—	—	—	876
1984	NE	13	38	709	18.7	**76**	5	—	—	—	—	—	—	—	—	—	709
1985	NE	15	39	760	19.5	50	5	1	0	0	—	—	—	—	—	—	760
1986	NE	**16**	**84**	**1,491**	17.8	44	10	—	—	—	—	—	—	—	—	—	**1,491**
1987	NE	10	40	672	16.8	45	3	—	—	—	—	—	—	—	—	—	672
1988	NE	**16**	31	502	16.2	32	4	1	-6	0	—	—	—	—	—	—	496
1989	NE	10	28	486	17.4	55	3	—	—	—	—	—	—	—	—	—	486
1990	IND	**16**	23	364	15.8	42	5	—	—	—	—	—	—	—	—	—	364
Career		196	557	10,716	19.2	76	72	21	127	0	92	960	1	2	29	0	11,832

=== College ===
Tennessee Volunteers career statistics
Season	GP	Rushing				Receiving				Kickoff Ret.			Punt Ret.			Totals			
Season	GP	Att	Yds	Avg	TD	Rec	Yds	Avg	TD	Ret	Yds	TD	Ret	Yds	TD	Att	Yds	Avg	TD
1973	11	2	32	16.0	0	22	511	23.2	4	14	309	0	0	0	0	38	852	22.4	4
1974	12	128	723	5.6	11	10	234	23.4	2	—	255	0	29	375	1	—	1,587	—	14
1975	12	133	809	6.1	8	2	13	6.5	0	—	63	0	20	284	2	—	1,169	—	10
1976	11	90	388	4.3	9	14	317	22.6	2	6	136	0	25	193	0	135	1,034	7.7	11
Career	46	353	1,952	5.5	28	48	1,075	22.4	8	37	763	0	74	852	3	512	4,642	9.1	39

== Coaching career ==
Morgan was wide receivers coach for the XFL's Memphis Maniax.
