= Mickey Marvin =

American football player (1955–2017)

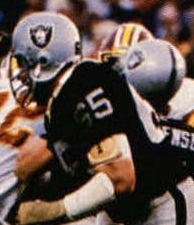
- Marvin playing for the Raiders in Super Bowl XVIII

No. 65
- Position: Guard

Personal information
- Born: October 5, 1955; Hendersonville, North Carolina, U.S.
- Died: March 6, 2017 (aged 61); Hendersonville, North Carolina, U.S.
- Listed height: 6 ft 4 in (1.93 m)
- Listed weight: 270 lb (122 kg)

Career information
- High school: Brevard (Brevard, North Carolina)
- College: Tennessee
- NFL draft: 1977: 4th round, 112th overall pick

Career history
- Oakland/Los Angeles Raiders (1977–1987)

Awards and highlights
- 2× Super Bowl champion (XV, XVIII); Second-team All-American (1975); 3× First-team All-SEC (1974, 1975, 1976)

Career NFL statistics
- Games played: 120
- Games started: 108
- Fumble recoveries: 4
- Stats at Pro Football Reference

Phillip Michael Marvin (October 5, 1955 – March 6, 2017) was an American professional football player who was a guard for the Oakland/Los Angeles Raiders of the National Football League (NFL). He played college football for the Tennessee Volunteers.

== Career ==
Before attending the University of Tennessee, Mickey was tutored by Kathy Collins at Brevard High School. This paved the way for him to enroll at the University of Tennessee, following a successful High School career.

After attending the University of Tennessee, Marvin played in the National Football League (NFL) for 11 seasons, from 1977 to 1987, as an offensive guard with the Oakland/Los Angeles Raiders. He was the starting right guard for the Raiders from 1978 to 1986, though playing only 2 games in 1979. With Dave Dalby and Gene Upshaw in 1980 and Dave Dalby and Charley Hannah in 1983, he helped solidify the middle of the offensive line which culminated in Raider wins of Super Bowl XV and Super Bowl XVIII. In the 1980 AFC championship game of the 1980–81 NFL playoffs, the Raiders beat the San Diego Chargers, rushing for 138 yards and passing for 261 yards. The Raiders then beat the Philadelphia Eagles in Super Bowl XV, rushing for a 117 yards and passing for 261 yards again, as Marvin outplayed Eagle nosetackle Charlie Johnson and inside linebackers Bill Bergey and Frank LeMaster. In the 1983 AFC championship game of the 1983–84 NFL playoffs, the Raiders beat the Seattle Seahawks, rushing for 205 yards and passing for 209 yards, as Marvin pushed around the nosetackle, Joe Nash, and the two inside linebackers Joe Norman and Keith Butler. The Raiders then beat the Washington Redskins in Super Bowl XVIII, rushing for a 231 yards and passing for 172 yards, as Marvin outmuscled the opposing defensive tackle, All-Pro Dave Butz.

Marvin died from amyotrophic lateral sclerosis, at the age of 61.
