= Derrel Gofourth =

American football player (born 1955)

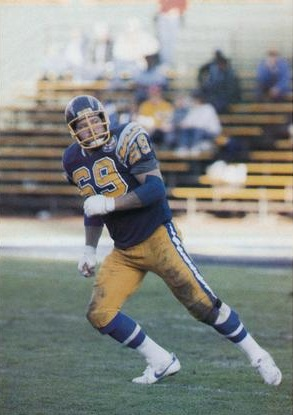
- Gofourth in 1984

No. 57, 69
- Positions: Guard, center

Personal information
- Born: March 20, 1955 (age 71); Parsons, Kansas, U.S.
- Listed height: 6 ft 3 in (1.91 m)
- Listed weight: 260 lb (118 kg)

Career information
- High school: Parsons
- College: Oklahoma State
- NFL draft: 1977: 7th round, 172nd overall pick

Career history
- Green Bay Packers (1977–1982); San Diego Chargers (1983–1984)

Awards and highlights
- Consensus All-American (1976); 2× First-team All-Big Eight (1975, 1976)

Career NFL statistics
- Games played: 116
- Games started: 72
- Fumble recoveries: 2
- Stats at Pro Football Reference

Derrel Gofourth (born March 20, 1955) is an American former professional football player who was guard and center in the National Football League (NFL). He played college football for the Oklahoma State Cowboys, earning consensus All-American honors in 1976. He played in the NFL for the Green Bay Packers from 1977 to 1982 and appeared in 85 games, before moving on to the San Diego Chargers from 1983 to 1984.

After retirement, he opened the Gofourth Agency and has sold insurance since 1990. In 2008 he was named as Oklahoma State's representative in the inaugural Big 12 Legends.
