= Dave Butterfield =

American football player (born 1954)

No. 34
- Position: Defensive back

Personal information
- Born: July 29, 1954 (age 72); Emporia, Kansas, U.S.
- Listed height: 5 ft 10 in (1.78 m)
- Listed weight: 185 lb (84 kg)

Career information
- High school: Sterling (Sterling, Colorado)
- College: Nebraska (1972–1976)
- NFL draft: 1977: 11th round, 307th overall pick

Career history
- 1978: Montreal Alouettes*
- * Offseason or practice squad member only

Awards and highlights
- Consensus All-American (1976); 2× First-team All-Big Eight (1975, 1976)

Dave Butterfield (born July 29, 1954) is an American former college football defensive back who played for the Nebraska Cornhuskers. He was a consensus All-American in 1976. He was selected by the New York Jets in the eleventh round of the 1977 NFL draft.

== Early life ==
Dave Butterfield was born on July 29, 1954, in Emporia, Kansas. He played high school football at Sterling High School in Sterling, Colorado and earned all-state honors.

== College career ==
Butterfield played college football for the Nebraska Cornhuskers of the University of Nebraska–Lincoln. He was on the freshman team in 1972 and redshirted the 1973 season. He was then a three-year letterman from 1974 to 1976. Butterfield became a starter his sophomore year in 1974 but missed part of the season due to a neck injury. Overall, he posted 12 solo tackles, 14 assisted tackles, and one pass breakup during the 1974 season. In 1975, he recorded 24 solo tackles, 17 assisted tackles, four interceptions, five fumble recoveries, five pass breakups, and one blocked punt, garnering first-team All-Big 8 recognition. As a senior in 1976, Butterfield had totals of 20 solo tackles, 18 assisted tackles, four interceptions, six pass breakups, and two blocked kicks. He was a consensus All-American in 1976. He also earned first-team All-Big 8 and first-team Academic All-Big 8 honors for the 1976 season. Butterfield majored in business administration at Nebraska.

== Professional career ==
Butterfield was selected by the New York Jets in the 11th round, with the 307th overall pick, of then 1977 NFL draft. However, at the urging of his agent Howard Slusher, he did not sign with the Jets. Butterfield was eligible to be drafted again in 1978 but went undrafted.

Butterfield signed with the Montreal Alouettes of the Canadian Football League (CFL) in 1978. On July 4, 1978, before the start of the 1978 CFL season, it was reported that he had been released.
