= Zac Henderson =

American gridiron football player (1955–2020)

No. 24
- Position: Defensive back

Personal information
- Born: October 14, 1955; Jena, Louisiana, U.S.
- Died: April 20, 2020 (aged 64); Oklahoma City, Oklahoma, U.S.
- Listed height: 6 ft 1 in (1.85 m)
- Listed weight: 190 lb (86 kg)

Career information
- High school: Burkburnett (TX)
- College: Oklahoma
- NFL draft: 1978: undrafted

Career history
- Miami Dolphins (1978)*; Hamilton Tiger-Cats (1978–1979); Cincinnati Bengals (1980)*; Philadelphia Eagles (1980); Toronto Argonauts (1982–1983); Tampa Bay Bandits (1984–1985)
- * Offseason or practice squad member only

Awards and highlights
- James P. McCaffrey Trophy (1982); CFL All-Star (1982); 2× National champion (1974, 1975); Unanimous All-American (1977); Second-team All-American (1976); 3× First-team All-Big Eight (1975, 1976, 1977)
- Stats at Pro Football Reference

Zachary Ryall Henderson (October 14, 1955 – April 20, 2020) was an American professional football player who played in the Canadian Football League (CFL) for four years. Henderson played defensive back for the Hamilton Tiger-Cats and Toronto Argonauts from 1978 to 1983. Henderson also played one season in the National Football League (NFL) for the Philadelphia Eagles and in the United States Football League for the Tampa Bay Bandits. He played college football at the University of Oklahoma, where he was a two-time All-American. He died in Oklahoma City on April 20, 2020.
