= Gary Green (American football) =

American football player (born 1955)

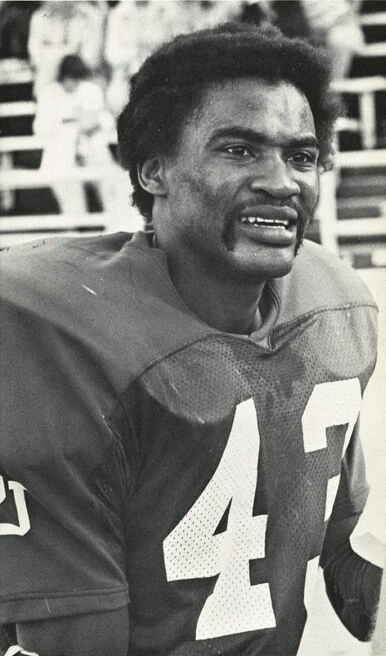
- Green with the Baylor Bears, c. 1976

No. 24, 27
- Position: Cornerback

Personal information
- Born: October 2, 1955 (age 71); San Antonio, Texas, U.S.
- Listed height: 5 ft 11 in (1.80 m)
- Listed weight: 187 lb (85 kg)

Career information
- High school: Sam Houston (TX)
- College: Baylor
- NFL draft: 1977: 1st round, 10th overall pick

Career history
- Kansas City Chiefs (1977–1983); Los Angeles Rams (1984–1985)

Awards and highlights
- 5× All-Pro (1981–1985); 4× Pro Bowl (1981, 1982, 1983, 1985); PFWA All-Rookie Team (1977); Kansas City Chiefs Hall of Fame; Consensus All-American (1976); First-team All-SWC (1976)

Career NFL statistics
- Interceptions: 33
- Fumble recoveries: 11
- Defensive touchdowns: 2
- Stats at Pro Football Reference

Gary Francis Green (born October 2, 1955) is an American former professional football player who was a cornerback for nine seasons in the National Football League (NFL). He played college football for the Baylor Bears and was selected by the Kansas City Chiefs in the first round of the 1977 NFL draft with the 10th overall pick. He played in the NFL from 1977 to 1985 and intercepted 33 passes over the course of his career. Green was selected to four Pro Bowls and five All-Pro teams during his career. He was inducted into the Kansas City Chiefs Hall of Fame in 2015.
