= 1976 All-SEC football team =

American college football all-star team

The 1976 All-SEC football team consists of American football players selected to the All-Southeastern Conference (SEC) chosen by various selectors for the 1976 NCAA Division I football season.

== Offensive selections ==
=== Receivers ===
- Larry Seivers, Tennessee (AP-1, UPI-1)
- Wes Chandler, Florida (AP-1)
- Gene Washington, Georgia (AP-2)
- Stanley Morgan, Tennessee (AP-2)

=== Tight ends ===
- Ozzie Newsome, Alabama (AP-1, UPI-1)
- Jimmy Stephens, Florida (AP-2)

=== Tackles ===
- Mike Wilson, Georgia (AP-1, UPI-1)
- Warren Bryant, Kentucky (AP-1, UPI-1)
- K. J. Lazenby, Alabama (AP-2)
- Bobby Dugas, LSU (AP-2)
- David Forrester, Florida (AP-2)

=== Guards ===
- Joel Parrish, Georgia (AP-1, UPI-1)
- Dave Gerasimchuk, Alabama (AP-1)
- Mickey Marvin, Tennessee (UPI-1)
- Sam Nichols, Mississippi State (AP-2)
- Dave Ostrowski, Auburn (AP-2)

=== Centers ===
- Richard Keys, Mississippi State (AP-1, UPI-1)
- Robbie Moore, Florida (AP-2)

=== Quarterbacks ===
- Ray Goff, Georgia (AP-1, UPI-1)
- Phil Gargis, Auburn (AP-2)

=== Running backs ===
- Terry Robiskie, LSU (AP-1, UPI-1)
- Kevin McLee, Georgia (AP-1, UPI-1)
- Stanley Morgan, Tennessee (UPI-1)
- Johnny Davis, Alabama (AP-2)
- Dennis Johnson, Mississippi State (AP-2)

=== Placekickers ===
- Allan Leavitt, Georgia (AP-1)
- Neil O'Donoghue, Auburn (AP-2)

== Defensive selections ==
=== Ends ===
- Art Still, Kentucky (AP-1, UPI-1)
- Lew Sibley, LSU (AP-1)
- Dickey Clark, Georgia (UPI-1)
- Paul Harris, Alabama (AP-2)
- Jeff McCollum, Auburn (AP-2)

=== Tackles ===
- A. J. Duhe, LSU (AP-1, UPI-1)
- Charley Hannah, Alabama (AP-1)
- Bob Baumhower, Alabama (AP-2, UPI-1)
- Darrell Carpenter, Florida (AP-2)

=== Middle guards ===
- Harvey Hull, Mississippi State (AP-1, UPI-1)

=== Linebackers ===
- Andy Spiva, Tennessee (AP-1, UPI-1)
- Ben Zambiasi, Georgia (AP-1, UPI-1)
- Ray Costict, Mississippi State (AP-1, UPI-1)
- Kem Coleman, Ole Miss (AP-2)
- Freddie Smith, Auburn (AP-2)
- Jon Streete, LSU (AP-2)
- Jim Kovach, Kentucky (AP-2)

=== Backs ===
- Bill Krug, Georgia (AP-1, UPI-1)
- Stan Black, Mississippi State (AP-1, UPI-1)
- Clinton Burrell, LSU (AP-1)
- Alvin Cowans, Florida (AP-2, UPI-1)
- Brenard Wilson, Vanderbilt (AP-2)
- Mike Siganos, Kentucky (AP-2)
- Charlie Moss, Ole Miss (AP-2)

=== Punters ===
- Craig Colquitt, Tennessee (AP-1)
- Clyde Baumgartner, Auburn (AP-2)

== Key ==
AP = Associated Press

UPI = United Press International

Bold = Consensus first-team selection by both AP and UPI

== See also ==
- 1976 College Football All-America Team
