= Ray Phillips (American football) =

American football player (born 1954)

No. 59, 52
- Position: Linebacker

Personal information
- Born: March 18, 1954 (age 72); Fordyce, Arkansas, U.S.
- Listed height: 6 ft 4 in (1.93 m)
- Listed weight: 224 lb (102 kg)

Career information
- High school: Milwaukee (WI) West Division
- College: Nebraska
- NFL draft: 1977: 5th round, 133rd overall pick

Career history
- Cincinnati Bengals (1977–1978); Philadelphia Eagles (1978–1981); Boston/New Orleans Breakers (1983-1984)

Awards and highlights
- First-team All-Big Eight (1976)

Career NFL statistics
- Fumble recoveries: 3
- Interceptions: 1
- Stats at Pro Football Reference

Ray Phillips (born March 18, 1954) is a former linebacker in the National Football League (NFL). Phillips was selected 133rd overall in the fifth round by the Cincinnati Bengals in the 1977 NFL draft. While a member of the Philadelphia Eagles, he participated in Super Bowl XV
