= Rashad Washington =

American football player and coach (born 1980)

No. 42
- Position: Defensive back

Personal information
- Born: March 15, 1980 (age 46); Wichita, Kansas, U.S.
- Listed height: 6 ft 2 in (1.88 m)
- Listed weight: 210 lb (95 kg)

Career information
- High school: Southeast (Wichita)
- College: Kansas State
- NFL draft: 2004: 7th round, 236th overall pick

Career history

Playing
- New York Jets (2004–2007); Wichita Wild (2011–2012); Kansas City Renegades (2013); Salina Bombers (2014); Texas Revolution (2014–2015)

Coaching
- Texas Revolution (DC) (2016–?)

Career NFL statistics
- Tackles: 77
- Sacks: 1.5
- Stats at Pro Football Reference

Rashad Washington (born March 15, 1980) is an American former professional football player who was a safety in the National Football League (NFL). He played college football for the Kansas State Wildcats and was selected by the New York Jets in the seventh round of the 2004 NFL draft.

== Early life ==
Washington played tailback and defensive back at Wichita Southeast in Wichita, Kansas.

== College career ==
While attending Kansas State University, he played in 49 games (38 on defense and 11 on offense) with 28 starts. He had come into Kansas State as a premier tailback, but made the shift to strong safety as a sophomore. On defense, he finished with 195 tackles, three sacks, three fumble recoveries, three forced fumbles, three interceptions, and two touchdowns. On special teams, he returned five blocked punts for 125 yards, and added 14 rushes for 106 yards and a reception for a 33-yard TD on offense. He also was a practice player for the basketball team for the 2000–2001 season, playing in 8 games.

== Professional career ==
=== New York Jets ===
Washington was selected by the Jets in the seventh round (236th overall) of the 2004 NFL draft. He saw action in 47 games from 2004 to 2007, making 77 tackles, 1.5 sacks and deflected 2 passes. He was released by the team on November 5, 2007.

=== Wichita Wild ===
On December 12, 2010, Washington signed a one-year deal with the Wichita Wild. His contract was renewed after the Wild's 2011 season.

=== Kansas City Renegades ===
Spent the 2013 Season with the Kansas City franchise of the CPIFL.

=== Texas Revolution ===
In 2014, Washington signed with the Texas Revolution of the Indoor Football League. Washington re-signed with the Revolution, who were moving to Champions Indoor Football, on October 1, 2014.

== Coaching career ==
Washington joined the Revolution coaching staff in November 2015 for the 2016 season as defensive coordinator.
