= Phil Dokes =

American football player (1955–1989)

No. 85
- Positions: Defensive end, defensive tackle

Personal information
- Born: September 7, 1955; Little Rock, Arkansas, U.S.
- Died: December 7, 1989 (aged 34); Jacksonville, Arkansas, U.S.
- Listed height: 6 ft 4 in (1.93 m)
- Listed weight: 258 lb (117 kg)

Career information
- High school: North Little Rock (AR)
- College: Oklahoma State
- NFL draft: 1977: 1st round, 12th overall pick

Career history
- Buffalo Bills (1977–1978); Michigan Panthers (1983)

Awards and highlights
- Third-team All-American (1976); 2× First-team All-Big Eight (1974, 1976); Second-team All-Big Eight (1975)

Career NFL statistics
- Sacks: 4
- Stats at Pro Football Reference

Philip Dennis Dokes (September 7, 1955 – December 7, 1989) was an American professional football player who was a defensive end and defensive tackle for two seasons with the Buffalo Bills of the National Football League (NFL) from 1977 to 1978. He was named an All-American as a defensive tackle while playing college football for the Oklahoma State Cowboys.
