= Bob Lingenfelter =

American football player (born 1954)

No. 75, 76
- Positions: Tackle, guard

Personal information
- Born: September 1, 1954; Norfolk, Nebraska, U.S.
- Died: January 29, 2025 (aged 70); Plainview, Nebraska, U.S.
- Listed height: 6 ft 7 in (2.01 m)
- Listed weight: 277 lb (126 kg)

Career information
- College: Nebraska
- NFL draft: 1977: 7th round, 188th overall pick

Career history
- Cleveland Browns (1977); Minnesota Vikings (1978)

Awards and highlights
- First-team All-Big Eight (1976); Second-team All-Big Eight (1975)

Career NFL statistics
- Games played: 19
- Games started: 2
- Stats at Pro Football Reference

Bob Lingenfelter (born September 1, 1954 – January 29, 2025) was an American professional football tackle and guard. He played for the Cleveland Browns in 1977 and for the Minnesota Vikings in 1978.

== High school and college career ==
Lingenfelter attended Plainview High School, he gathered all-conference and all-state honors in football, while also finishing as the state runner-up heavyweight wrestler and setting school records in shot put and discus for the track team.

Lingenfelter then enjoyed a standout college football career playing for his home state Nebraska Cornhuskers, earning second-team All-Big Eight honors as a junior in 1975 and first-team All-Big Eight and honorable mention All-American honors as a senior.

== Pro career ==
Lingenfelter was picked in the seventh round of the 1977 NFL Draft by the Cleveland Browns. He played 14 games for the Browns in 1977, starting two. He played five games in 1978 for the Minnesota Vikings.

== Personal ==
Following his football career, Lingenfelter returned to Plainview to work as a farmer.

In 2012, Lingenfelter ran as a Republican in the U.S. House primary to represent Nebraska's 3rd District. He lost to incumbent U.S. Representative Adrian Smith 81.4% to 18.6%.

Lingenfelter worked for WJAG News Talk radio (780 AM) out of Norfolk, Nebraska, as an on-air market analyst.

Lingenfelter's father played on the freshman team at Nebraska, while his son Newton was a walk-on who earned a scholarship in 2005 and his nephew Ben also played for the Huskers. Another of Lingenfelter's sons, Harrison, played college football at University of Nebraska Omaha.

Lingenfelter was inducted into the Nebraska Football Hall of Fame in 2006. He was also inducted into the Plainview High School Hall of Fame in 2021.

Lingenfelter died of a heart attack on January 29, 2025.
