= Odis McKinney =

American football player (born 1957)

No. 23, 21
- Position: Defensive back

Personal information
- Born: May 19, 1957 (age 69); Detroit, Michigan, U.S.
- Listed height: 6 ft 2 in (1.88 m)
- Listed weight: 187 lb (85 kg)

Career information
- College: Colorado
- NFL draft: 1978: 2nd round, 37th overall pick

Career history
- New York Giants (1978–1979); Oakland/Los Angeles Raiders (1980–1984); Kansas City Chiefs (1985); Los Angeles Raiders (1985-1986)

Awards and highlights
- 2× Super Bowl champion (XV, XVIII); First-team All-Big Eight (1977); Second-team All-Big Eight (1976)

Career NFL statistics
- Interceptions: 11
- Fumble recoveries: 6
- Sacks: 8
- Stats at Pro Football Reference

Odis McKinney Jr. (born May 19, 1957) is an American former professional football player who was a cornerback in the National Football League (NFL) for the New York Giants the Oakland/Los Angeles Raiders, and the Kansas City Chiefs. He played college football for the Colorado Buffaloes and was selected in the second round of the 1978 NFL draft.

McKinney played high school football at Reseda High in Los Angeles and college football at Los Angeles Valley College in the San Fernando Valley before transferring to the University of Colorado at Boulder.
