= 1975 All-Big Eight Conference football team =

American all-star college football team

The 1975 All-Big Eight Conference football team consists of American football players chosen by various organizations for All-Big Eight Conference teams for the 1975 NCAA Division I football season. The selectors for the 1975 season included the Associated Press (AP) and United Press International (UPI).

== Offensive selections ==
=== Ends ===
- Henry Marshall, Missouri (AP-1; UPI-1)
- Don Hasselbeck, Colorado (AP-1; UPI-1)
- Bobby Thomas, Nebraska (AP-2)
- Forry Smith, Iowa State (AP-2)

=== Offensive tackles ===
- Mike Koncar, Colorado (AP-1; UPI-1)
- Mike Vaughan, Oklahoma (AP-1; UPI-1)
- Bob Lingenfelter, Nebraska (AP-2)
- Steve Hoins, Nebraska (AP-2)

=== Offensive guards ===
- Terry Webb, Oklahoma (AP-1; UPI-1)
- Derrel Gofourth, Oklahoma State (AP-1; UPI-1)
- Dan Schmidt, Nebraska (AP-2)
- Bob Bos, Iowa State (AP-2)

=== Centers ===
- Rik Bonness, Nebraska (AP-1; UPI-1)
- Pete Brock, Colorado (AP-2)

=== Quarterbacks ===
- Nolan Cromwell, Kansas (AP-1; UPI-1)
- Steve Pisarkiewicz, Missouri (AP-2; UPI-2)
- Dave Williams, Colorado (UPI-2)

=== Backs ===
- Joe Washington, Oklahoma (AP-1; UPI-1)
- Terry Miller, Oklahoma State (AP-1; UPI-1)
- Terry Kunz, Colorado (AP-1; UPI-1)
- Tony Galbreath, Missouri (AP-2; UPI-2)
- Tony Davis, Nebraska (AP-2; UPI-2)
- Laverne Smith, Kansas (AP-2)

=== Placekickers ===
- Tony DiRienzo, OKlahoma (AP-1; UPI-1)
- Tim Gibbons, Missouri (AP-2)

== Defensive selections ==
=== Defensive ends ===
- Jimbo Elrod, Oklahoma (AP-1; UPI-1)
- Bob Martin, Nebraska (AP-1; UPI-1)
- Troy Archer, Colorado (AP-2)
- Bob McRoberts, Missouri (AP-2)

=== Defensive tackles ===
- Lee Roy Selmon, Oklahoma (AP-1; UPI-1)
- Mike Butler, Kansas (AP-1; UPI-1)
- Phil Dokes, Oklahoma State (AP-2)
- Mike Fultz, Nebraska (AP-2)

=== Middle guards ===
- Dewey Selmon, Oklahoma (AP-1; UPI-1)
- John Lee, Nebraska (AP-2)

=== Linebackers ===
- Gary Spani, Kansas State (AP-1; UPI-1)
- Gary Campbell, Colorado (AP-1; UPI-1)
- Wonder Monds, Nebraska (AP-1; UPI-1)
- Brent Robinson, Oklahoma State (AP-2)
- Carl Pennington, Kansas State (AP-2)
- Clete Pillen, Nebraska (AP-2)

=== Cornerbacks ===
- Ken Downing, Missouri (AP-1; UPI-1)
- Kurt Knoff, Kansas (AP-1; UPI-1)
- Dave Butterfield, Nebraska (AP-2; UPI-1)
- Jerry Anderson, Oklahoma (AP-2)

=== Safeties ===
- Zac Henderson, Oklahoma (AP-1)
- Jim Burrow, Nebraska (AP-2)

=== Punter ===
- Cliff Parsley, Oklahoma State (UPI-1)

== Key ==
AP = Associated Press

UPI = United Press International

== See also ==
- 1975 College Football All-America Team
