= Ron McCartney =

American football player (born 1954)

No. 56
- Position: Linebacker

Personal information
- Born: July 20, 1954 (age 72); Charleston, West Virginia, U.S.
- Listed height: 6 ft 1 in (1.85 m)
- Listed weight: 220 lb (100 kg)

Career information
- High school: Stonewall Jackson (WV)
- College: Tennessee
- NFL draft: 1976: 2nd round, 53rd overall pick

Career history
- Atlanta Falcons (1977–1979)

Awards and highlights
- First-team All-SEC (1975)

Career NFL statistics
- Fumble recoveries: 4
- Stats at Pro Football Reference

Ronnie L. McCartney (born July 20, 1954) is an American former professional football player who was a linebacker in the National Football League (NFL). He played college football for the Tennessee Volunteers, earning outstanding defensive player of the game honors in the 1974 Liberty Bowl.

== Career ==
After playing college football as a defensive end at the University of Tennessee, he was selected by the Los Angeles Rams with the 53rd overall pick in the second round of the 1976 NFL draft. He spent the entire 1976 season with the Rams on the injured reserve list. After the Rams waived him before the 1977 season, he was picked up by the Falcons. He spent three seasons as a linebacker for the Falcons, playing in 45 games from 1977 through 1979. He recovered four fumbles during his career. The Falcons cut him before the 1980 season.
