= Laverne Smith =

American football player (born 1954)

No. 37
- Position: Running back

Personal information
- Born: September 12, 1954 (age 72); Greenwood, Mississippi, U.S.
- Listed height: 5 ft 10 in (1.78 m)
- Listed weight: 193 lb (88 kg)

Career information
- High school: Southeast (Wichita, Kansas)
- College: Kansas
- NFL draft: 1977: 4th round, 99th overall pick

Career history
- Pittsburgh Steelers (1977)

Awards and highlights
- First-team All-Big Eight (1974); 2× Second-team All-Big Eight (1975, 1976)

Career NFL statistics
- Rushing attempts: 14
- Rushing yards: 55
- Return yards: 365
- Stats at Pro Football Reference

Laverne Smith (born September 12, 1954) is an American former professional football player who was a running back for the Pittsburgh Steelers of the National Football League (NFL). He was selected by the Steelers in the fourth round of the 1977 NFL draft. He played college football at the University of Kansas.

== Early life ==
Smith played high school football at Wichita Southeast High School in Wichita, Kansas, earning first-team All-City honors in 1971 and 1972. He also participated in track and field for the Golden Buffaloes, winning the state championship in the 100-yard dash in 1971. He was inducted into the Southeast High School Sports Hall of Fame in 2012.

== College career ==
Smith played for the Kansas Jayhawks from 1973 to 1976 and was a three-year starter. He garnered All-Big Eight recognition in 1974. He set school records for career rushing yards with 3,192 and single season rushing yards with 1,181 in 1974. Smith also accumulated career totals of 23 rushing touchdowns on 488 attempts. Over his career, he averaged 6.5 yards per carry. He recorded 217 yards and two touchdowns on 21 receptions. He also participated in track for the Jayhawks, winning the 1976 Big Eight championship in the 100 meters and 440-yard relay. His personal bests were 10.29 for the 100 meters, and 20.44 for the 200 meter dash.

== Professional career ==
Smith was selected in the fourth round by the Pittsburgh Steelers with the 99th pick in the 1977 NFL Draft. He played in seven games for the team, and later suffered a broken leg, during the 1977 season. He tied Jim Smith for the team-lead with 16 kick returns. Laverne spent a few more years on the Steelers roster.

== Personal life ==
Smith later worked at Boeing Wichita.
