= Lynching of Bernice Raspberry =

1927 murder of a Black man in Mississippi

Coordinates: 31°9′14″N 88°33′21″W

- Location: Leakesville, Mississippi, U.S.
- Date: May 25, 1927
- Attack type: Lynching
- Deaths: 1
- Victims: Bernice Raspberry, aged 23

Bernice Raspberry, also called Ed Lively, was a 23-year old African-American man who was murdered in Leakesville, Mississippi, on May 25, 1927. Raspberry was arrested for an infraction in Leakesville, but then the sheriff was told he was wanted in nearby Bothwell for "alleged improper conduct with a white woman". Raspberry was taken to Bothwell but then taken back to Leakesville, for safe keeping. A group of some 100 masked men took him from the jail, strung him to a tree, and shot him many times.
