= Andy Spiva =

American football player (1955–1979)

No. 51
- Position: Linebacker

Personal information
- Born: February 6, 1955; Chattanooga, Tennessee, U.S.
- Died: April 3, 1979 (aged 24); Atlanta, Georgia, U.S.
- Listed height: 6 ft 2 in (1.88 m)
- Listed weight: 220 lb (100 kg)

Career information
- High school: Chamblee (GA)
- College: Tennessee
- NFL draft: 1977: 5th round, 135th overall pick

Career history
- Atlanta Falcons (1977)

Awards and highlights
- 2× First-team All-SEC (1975, 1976)

Career NFL statistics
- Fumble recoveries: 1
- Stats at Pro Football Reference

Howard Andrew Spiva (February 6, 1955 – April 3, 1979) was an American professional football player for the Atlanta Falcons of the National Football League (NFL). He appeared in 13 games for the Falcons in 1977. He was killed in a car accident. Teammate Garth TenNapel was in the same vehicle and was seriously injured.

== Biography ==
Spiva was born on February 6, 1955, in Chattanooga, Tennessee. He attended Chamblee High School in Chamblee, Georgia and the University of Tennessee. At Tennessee, Spiva was a two-time All-Southeastern Conference selection. He was drafted 135th overall by the St. Louis Cardinals in the fifth round of the 1977 NFL draft with the 135th overall pick.

Spiva was released by St. Louis that year when the team made its final preseason cuts. He was signed by the Atlanta Falcons shortly thereafter. Falcons coach Leeman Bennett said that the team had become impressed with Spiva when they played Spiva and the Cardinals in a preseason game.

He played in 13 games for the Falcons in 1977. Prior to the 1978 season, Spiva was the top middle linebacker on Atlanta's depth chart before suffering a preseason knee injury. He underwent surgery to repair torn ligaments a few days after sustaining the injury.

On April 3, 1979, Spiva was driving in rainy conditions when his sports car slid off of a street in the Atlanta area and it collided with a tree. Spiva died at Northside Hospital that day after sustaining head and chest injuries. His teammate Garth TenNapel was seriously injured in the crash. Spiva and TenNapel had been close friends since going through knee rehabilitation together the previous year.

== See also ==
- List of gridiron football players who died during their careers
