= Jim Kovach =

American football player, physician, attorney and businessman (born 1956)

No. 52, 57
- Position: Linebacker

Personal information
- Born: May 1, 1956 (age 70); Parma Heights, Ohio, U.S.
- Listed height: 6 ft 2 in (1.88 m)
- Listed weight: 230 lb (104 kg)

Career information
- High school: Valley Forge (OH)
- College: Kentucky
- NFL draft: 1979: 4th round, 93rd overall pick

Career history
- New Orleans Saints (1979–1985); San Francisco 49ers (1985)

Awards and highlights
- First-team All-SEC (1978); 2× Second-team All-SEC (1975, 1976)

Career NFL statistics
- Sacks: 9.5
- Fumble recoveries: 2
- Interceptions: 4
- Stats at Pro Football Reference

James Kovach (born May 1, 1956) is a former American football linebacker who played seven seasons in the National Football League (NFL) for the New Orleans Saints and San Francisco 49ers. He played college football at the University of Kentucky, where he also studied medicine.

== Early life ==
Kovach played as a linebacker at University of Kentucky while studying pre-medicine. Because he had an injury-related redshirt season, he played his senior year of eligibility while taking his freshman year at University of Kentucky College of Medicine.

== Career ==
=== National Football League ===
Kovach was drafted 93rd overall in the fourth round by the New Orleans Saints in the 1979 NFL draft and played for the team for six seasons, while completing his medical education at University of Kentucky College of Medicine in the off-seasons. October 7, 1984 James Kovach was the player that tackled Walter Payton on the play that Walter Payton broke Jim Browns rushing record. In 1985, he played as a linebacker for the San Francisco 49ers. After his retirement from the NFL, Kovach earned his J.D. degree from Stanford Law School and practiced as an intellectual-property attorney before becoming a business owner.

=== Post-NFL career ===
Kovach has also worked with several organizations in the fields of aging research. He is a former president of the Buck Institute for Research on Aging. Kovach is a member of the NFL concussion committee.

In 2010, Kovach was recognized by the College Sports Communicators as member of the Academic All-America Hall of Fame.

Kovach was the COO and SVP of Business Development of CrowdOptic.

He is currently the Director, Entrepreneurism and Innovation at the University of California Davis Health.
