= Mike Wilson (offensive lineman) =

American football player (born 1955)

No. 77, 75
- Position: Offensive tackle

Personal information
- Born: May 28, 1955 (age 71); Norfolk, Virginia, U.S.
- Listed height: 6 ft 5 in (1.96 m)
- Listed weight: 275 lb (125 kg)

Career information
- High school: Johnson (GA)
- College: Georgia
- NFL draft: 1977: 4th round, 103rd overall pick

Career history
- Toronto Argonauts (1977); Cincinnati Bengals (1978–1985); Seattle Seahawks (1986–1989)

Awards and highlights
- CFL All-Star (1977); CFL East All-Star (1977); Leo Dandurand Trophy (1977); First-team All-American (1976); First-team All-SEC (1976); Second-team All-SEC (1975)

Career NFL statistics
- Games played: 174
- Games started: 172
- Fumble recoveries: 3
- Stats at Pro Football Reference

Mike Wilson (born May 28, 1955) is an American former professional football player who was an offensive tackle in the National Football League (NFL) for the Cincinnati Bengals and the Seattle Seahawks. He also played with the Toronto Argonauts of the Canadian Football League (CFL) in 1977. He played college football for the Georgia Bulldogs.

== Career ==
He attended Johnson High School in Gainesville, Georgia.

Wilson played college football at the University of Georgia. As a sophomore, he started for the Bulldogs as a defensive tackle as the Bulldogs went 6-6. In 1975 as a junior he was switched to offense and became the Bulldogs' starting left tackle as the team went 9–3. In 1976 as a senior he remained a starter as Georgia went 10-2 and won the Southeastern Conference championship. His nickname was "Moonpie."

He was chosen 103rd overall in the fourth round (103rd overall) of the 1977 NFL draft. However, he signed with the CFL's Argonauts for the 1977 season. He had an outstanding season, as he was named runner-up for the CFL Outstanding Lineman Award and he was named an All-Canadian All-Star.

His first NFL season was with the Bengals in 1978, and he made an immediate impact, starting eight of the nine games he played on his way to becoming a perennial starter. For each of his next seven seasons with the Bengals, he did not miss a game, starting all but one.

Wilson helped lead the Bengals to the Super Bowl XVI in 1982. He was with the Bengals for eight seasons, from 1978 through 1985.

He then played for the Seahawks for four seasons, joining them in 1986 and starting all 16 games. In his final three NFL seasons, he played 12, 16, and 16 games, starting them all through the 1989, the final season of his 12-year NFL career.
