= Cliff Frazier =

American football player and actor (1952–2014)

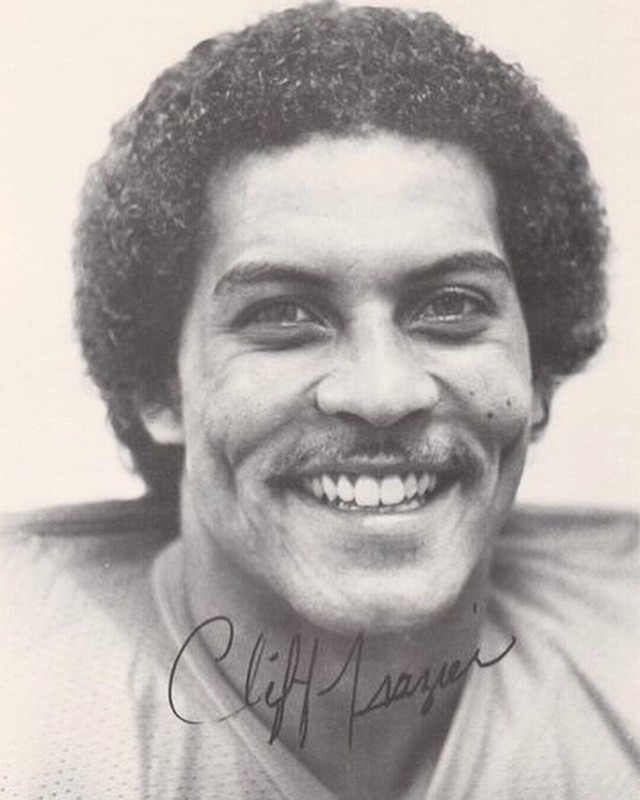

No. 61
- Position: Defensive tackle

Personal information
- Born: November 23, 1952 (age 73); St. Louis, Missouri, U.S.
- Listed height: 6 ft 4 in (1.93 m)
- Listed weight: 265 lb (120 kg)

Career information
- College: UCLA
- NFL draft: 1976: 2nd round, 41st overall pick

Career history
- Kansas City Chiefs (1977)

Awards and highlights
- First-team All-American (1975); First-team All-Pac-8 (1975)

Career NFL statistics
- Sacks: 1
- Stats at Pro Football Reference

Clifford Henry Frazier (23 November 1952 – 17 August 2014) was an American professional football player and actor. Born in St. Louis, Missouri, he was a defensive tackle for the Kansas City Chiefs, starting 12 of 14 games for the Chiefs in 1977. He had played college football for the UCLA Bruins, where he was a member of their 1976 Rose Bowl Game championship team. He was selected for the College All-Star Game after his senior year.

Frazier was the 41st overall pick in the second round of the 1976 NFL draft by the Chiefs. He was traded to the Philadelphia Eagles before the 1976 season in exchange for two future draft picks. The Eagles traded him to the Los Angeles Rams after the season, but the Rams cut him. The Chiefs re-signed him before the 1977 season. After one season with the Chiefs, Frazier decided to retire.

After retiring from professional football, Frazier had roles in several films, including North Dallas Forty, Vice Squad and House Party. He played the character of Jethro Snell in 79 (of 80) episodes of HBO's football comedy 1st & 10 between 1984 and 1991.
