= Mike Vaughan =

American football player (born 1954)

No. 79
- Position: Offensive lineman Right Tackle

Personal information
- Born: October 2, 1954 (age 72); Chickasha, Oklahoma, U.S.
- Listed height: 6 ft 7 in (2.01 m)
- Listed weight: 285 lb (129 kg)

Career information
- High school: Ada, Oklahoma
- College: Oklahoma
- NFL draft: 1977: 4th round, 88th overall pick

Career history
- 1973–1976: Oklahoma Sooners

Awards and highlights
- 2× National champion (1974, 1975); Unanimous All-American (1976); Second-team All-American (1975); 2× First-team All-Big Eight (1975, 1976)

Mike Vaughan (born October 2, 1954) is an American former football player who was an offensive lineman for the Oklahoma Sooners football team of the University of Oklahoma from 1973 to 1976. Vaughan was recognized as a consensus first-team All-American following his 1976 senior season. He was picked 88th overall in the fourth round of the 1977 NFL draft by the New York Giants.
