= 1976 All-Big Eight Conference football team =

American all-star college football team

The 1976 All-Big Eight Conference football team consists of American football players chosen by various organizations for All-Big Eight Conference teams for the 1976 NCAA Division I football season. The selectors for the 1976 season included the Associated Press (AP).

== Offensive selections ==
=== Quarterbacks ===
- Vince Ferragamo, Nebraska (AP-1)
- Wayne Stanley, Iowa State (AP-2)

=== Running backs ===
- Terry Miller, Oklahoma State (AP-1)
- Tony Reed, Colorado (AP-1)
- Laverne Smith, Kansas (AP-2)
- Dexter Green, Iowa State (AP-2)

=== Tight ends ===
- Don Hasselbeck, Colorado (AP-1)
- Kellen Winslow, Missouri (AP-2)

=== Centers ===
- Derrel Gofourth, Oklahoma State (AP-1)
- Larry McDevitt, Missouri (AP-2)

=== Offensive guards ===
- Dave Greenwood, Iowa State (AP-1)
- Dan Schmidt, Nebraska (AP-1)
- Joel Yearian, Missouri (AP-2)
- Jamie Melendez, Oklahoma (AP-2)

=== Offensive tackles ===
- Mike Vaughan, Oklahoma (AP-1)
- Bob Lingenfelter, Nebraska (AP-1)
- Morris Towns, Missouri (AP-2)
- Steve Hoins, Nebraska (AP-2)

=== Wide receivers ===
- Luther Blue, Iowa State (AP-1)
- Joe Stewart, Missouri (AP-1)
- Leo Lewis, Missouri (AP-2)
- Chuck Malito, Nebraska (AP-2)

=== Kicker ===
- Abby Daigle, Oklahoma State (AP-1)

== Defensive selections ==
=== Defensive ends ===
- Ray Phillips, Nebraska (AP-1)
- Daria Butler, Oklahoma State (AP-1)
- Lorenzo Turner, Oklahoma State (AP-2)
- Mike Phillips, Oklahoma (AP-2)

=== Defensive tackles ===
- Phil Dokes, Oklahoma State (AP-1)
- Mike Fultz, Nebraska (AP-1)
- Mike Butler, Kansas (AP-2)
- Ron Pruitt, Nebraska (AP-2)

=== Middle guards ===
- Charlie Johnson, Colorado (AP-1)
- Mike Stensrud, Iowa State (AP-2)

=== Linebackers ===
- Clete Phillen, Nebraska (AP-1)
- Darryl Hunt, Oklahoma (AP-1)
- Terry Beeson, Kansas (AP-2)
- Gary Spani, Kansas State (AP-2)

=== Defensive backs ===
- Zac Henderson, Oklahoma (AP-1)
- Scott Hill, Oklahoma (AP-1)
- Mike Spivey, Colorado (AP-1)
- Dave Butterfield, Nebraska (AP-1)
- Odis McKinney, Colorado (AP-2)
- Willie Lester, Oklahoma State (AP-2)
- Skip Sharp, Kansas (AP-2)
- Tony Hawkins, Iowa State (AP-2)

=== Punter ===
- Cliff Parsley, Oklahoma State (AP-1)

== Key ==
AP = Associated Press

== See also ==
- 1976 College Football All-America Team
