= Leakesville, Mississippi =

- Town
- Interactive location map of Leakesville
- Coordinates: 31.149202°N 88.555853°W
- Country: United States
- State: Mississippi
- County: Greene
- Established: 1826
- Incorporated: January 7, 1904

Government
  - Mayor: David West

Area
  - Total: 6.293 sq mi (16.299 km^{2})
  - Land: 6.283 sq mi (16.274 km^{2})
  - Water: 0.0097 sq mi (0.025 km^{2}) 0.16%
- Elevation: 98 ft (30 m)

Population (2020)
  - Total: 3,775
  - Estimate (2024): 3,743
  - Density: 600.8/sq mi (232.0/km^{2})
- Time zone: UTC–6 (Central (CST))
  - Summer (DST): UTC–5 (CDT)
- ZIP Code: 39451
- Area codes: 601 and 769
- FIPS code: 28-39840
- GNIS feature ID: 2405995
- Website: leakesvillems.com

Leakesville is a town in and the county seat of Greene County, Mississippi, United States. It is located along the Chickasawhay River. It is served by the junction of Mississippi routes 57 and 63. The population was 3,775 at the 2020 census, and was estimated at 3,743 in 2024.

== History ==
Like most of Mississippi, this area was part of the traditional territory of the historic Choctaw. Under the Indian Removal Act of 1830, they were forced to cede their lands in this area to the United States. The Choctaw were the first of the Southeast Five Civilized Tribes to be removed to Indian Territory (now Oklahoma), west of the Mississippi River. Some members remained in the state, and their descendants have maintained cultural identity. They gained federal recognition as the Mississippi Band of Choctaw Indians.

A post office called Leakesville has been in operation since 1829, when European Americans established a settlement here. The town was named for Walter Leake, third governor of Mississippi. The area was developed for cotton plantations in the nineteenth century and remains mostly rural.

In 1927, an African-American man named Bernice Raspberry, aged 23, who had been arrested for alleged improper conduct with a white woman, was taken from the jail and lynched.

== Geography ==
Leakesville is in southeastern Greene County, on the west side of the Chickasawhay River, a south-flowing tributary of the Pascagoula River. Via Mississippi Highway 63, it is 20 miles (32 km) south to Lucedale and 19 miles (31 km) northwest to Sand Hill. Via Highway 57, it is 24 miles (39 km) north to State Line and 17 miles (27 km) west to McLain.

According to the United States Census Bureau, the town has a total area of 6.293 square miles (16.30 km^{2}), of which 6.283 square miles (16.27 km^{2}) is land and 0.010 square miles (0.026 km^{2}) (0.57%) is water.

== Demographics ==
Historical population
Census	Pop.	Note	%±
1910	466		—
1920	555		19.1%
1930	562		1.3%
1940	834		48.4%
1950	893		7.1%
1960	1,014		13.5%
1970	1,090		7.5%
1980	1,120		2.8%
1990	1,129		0.8%
2000	1,026		−9.1%
2010	898		−12.5%
2020	3,775		320.4%
2024 (est.)	3,743	▼	−0.8%
U.S. Decennial Census; 2020 Census

The sudden population increase and shift in racial demographics can be explained by the annexation of the South Mississippi Correctional Institution.

=== Racial and ethnic composition ===
Leakesville, Mississippi – racial and ethnic composition Note: the US Census treats Hispanic/Latino as an ethnic category. This table excludes Latinos from the racial categories and assigns them to a separate category. Hispanics/Latinos may be of any race.
Race / ethnicity (NH = non-Hispanic)	Pop. 1990	Pop. 2000	Pop. 2010	Pop. 2020	% 1990	% 2000	% 2010	% 2020
White alone (NH)	837	814	694	1,686	74.14%	79.34%	77.28%	44.66%
Black or African American alone (NH)	275	199	177	1,981	24.36%	19.40%	19.71%	52.48%
Native American or Alaska Native alone (NH)	1	1	0	7	0.09%	0.10%	0.00%	0.19%
Asian alone (NH)	0	1	1	0	0.00%	0.10%	0.11%	0.00%
Pacific Islander alone (NH)	—	0	0	0	—	0.00%	0.00%	0.00%
Other race alone (NH)	0	0	0	1	0.00%	0.00%	0.00%	0.03%
Mixed race or multiracial (NH)	—	0	5	50	—	0.00%	0.56%	1.32%
Hispanic or Latino (any race)	16	11	21	50	1.42%	1.07%	2.34%	1.32%
Total	1,129	1,026	898	3,775	100.00%	100.00%	100.00%	100.00%

=== 2020 census ===
As of the 2020 census, there were 3,775 people, 466 households, and 282 families residing in the town.

The median age was 40.5 years. 7.7% of residents were under the age of 18 and 10.0% of residents were 65 years of age or older. For every 100 females, there were 470.2 males, and for every 100 females age 18 and over, there were 580.3 males age 18 and over.

The population density was 600.83 inhabitants per square mile (232.0/km^{2}). There were 588 housing units at an average density of 93.59 per square mile (36.1/km^{2}). Of all housing units, 20.7% were vacant. The homeowner vacancy rate was 3.6%, and the rental vacancy rate was 11.8%.

0.0% of residents lived in urban areas, while 100.0% lived in rural areas.

Of the 466 households, 31.8% had children under the age of 18 living in them. Of all households, 36.1% were married-couple households, 17.8% were households with a male householder and no spouse or partner present, and 40.3% were households with a female householder and no spouse or partner present. About 36.3% of all households were made up of individuals, and 18.3% had someone living alone who was 65 years of age or older.

=== 2010 census ===
As of the 2010 census, there were 898 people, 371 households, and _ families residing in the town. The population density was 567.64 inhabitants per square mile (219.2/km^{2}). There were 424 housing units at an average density of 268.02 per square mile (103.5/km^{2}). The racial makeup of the town was 78.29% White, 20.04% African American, 0.00% Native American, 0.11% Asian, 0.00% Pacific Islander, 0.33% from some other races and 1.22% from two or more races. Hispanic or Latino people of any race were 2.34% of the population.

=== 2000 census ===
As of the 2000 census, there were 1,026 people, 390 households, and 262 families residing in the town. The population density was 647.9 inhabitants per square mile (250.2/km^{2}). There were 463 housing units at an average density of 292.4 per square mile (112.9/km^{2}). The racial makeup of the town was 79.92% White, 19.40% African American, 0.10% Native American, 0.10% Asian, 0.00% Pacific Islander, 0.49% from some other races and 0.00% from two or more races. Hispanic or Latino people of any race were 1.07% of the population.

There were 390 households, out of which 27.2% had children under the age of 18 living with them, 51.0% were married couples living together, 14.9% had a female householder with no husband present, and 32.6% were non-families. 29.7% of all households were made up of individuals, and 14.9% had someone living alone who was 65 years of age or older. The average household size was 2.34 and the average family size was 2.92.

In the town, the population was spread out, with 21.5% under the age of 18, 8.1% from 18 to 24, 19.6% from 25 to 44, 23.5% from 45 to 64, and 27.3% who were 65 years of age or older. The median age was 46 years. For every 100 females, there were 71.6 males. For every 100 females age 18 and over, there were 66.0 males.

The median income for a household in the town was $26,731, and the median income for a family was $33,618. Males had a median income of $30,208 versus $19,167 for females. The per capita income for the town was $14,674. About 17.0% of families and 21.5% of the population were below the poverty line, including 38.0% of those under age 18 and 12.3% of those age 65 or over.

== Government and infrastructure ==
The Mississippi Department of Corrections South Mississippi Correctional Institution is located in Leakesville. In 2018, a judge approved an agreement for Leakesville to annex multiple areas, including SMCI.

== Education ==
Leakesville is served by the Greene County School District. Schools include Greene County High School, Leakesville Junior High School, and Leakesville Elementary School.

== Notable people ==
- Don Churchwell, NFL player
- Kermit Davis, former head basketball coach at Ole Miss
- Dennis DeBar, member of the Mississippi State Senate
- Reed Green, former head football coach and athletic director for the University of Southern Mississippi
- Bill Hicks, comedian, buried in Magnolia Cemetery
- Jerry Lott, local-turned-regional rockabilly artist performing as "Marty Lott" and later "Gulf Coast Fireball"
- Wilmer Mizell, MLB pitcher and congressman
- Walter Packer, NFL player
