= Joel Parrish =

American football player (born 1955)

No. 54
- Position: Offensive guard

Personal information
- Born: September 1, 1955 (age 71); Lowndes County, Georgia, U.S.
- Listed height: 6 ft 3 in (1.91 m)
- Listed weight: 256 lb (116 kg)

Career information
- High school: Coffee County (Douglas, Georgia)
- College: Georgia (1973–1976)
- NFL draft: 1977: 11th round, 292nd overall pick

Career history
- 1977: Cincinnati Bengals*
- 1977–1978: Toronto Argonauts
- * Offseason or practice squad member only

Awards and highlights
- Consensus All-American (1976); First-team All-SEC (1976)

Joel Parrish (born September 1, 1955) is an American former professional football offensive guard who played two seasons with the Toronto Argonauts of the Canadian Football League (CFL). He was selected by the Cincinnati Bengals in the eleventh round of the 1977 NFL draft after playing college football for the Georgia Bulldogs; he was a consensus All-American in 1976.

== Early life ==
Joel Parrish was born on September 1, 1955, in Lowndes County, Georgia. He attended Coffee County High School in Douglas, Georgia. He was drafted by the Los Angeles Dodgers of Major League Baseball but chose to attend the University of Georgia.

== College career ==
Parrish was a member of the Georgia Bulldogs from 1973 to 1976 and a three-year letterman from 1974 to 1976. He was a consensus All-American in 1976. He was also named first-team All-SEC in 1976 by both the Associated Press and United Press International.

== Professional career ==
Parrish was selected by the Cincinnati Bengals in the eleventh round, with the 292nd overall pick, of the 1977 NFL draft. He was released by the Bengals later in 1977.

He played in all 16 games for the Toronto Argonauts of the Canadian Football League in 1977 and recovered two fumbles. He played in six games in 1978.

== Personal life ==
Parrish and four other men were arrested in 2001 in Australia on charges of drug trafficking after smuggling 2,457 pounds of cocaine into the country.
