= Oscar Edwards =

American businessman and football player

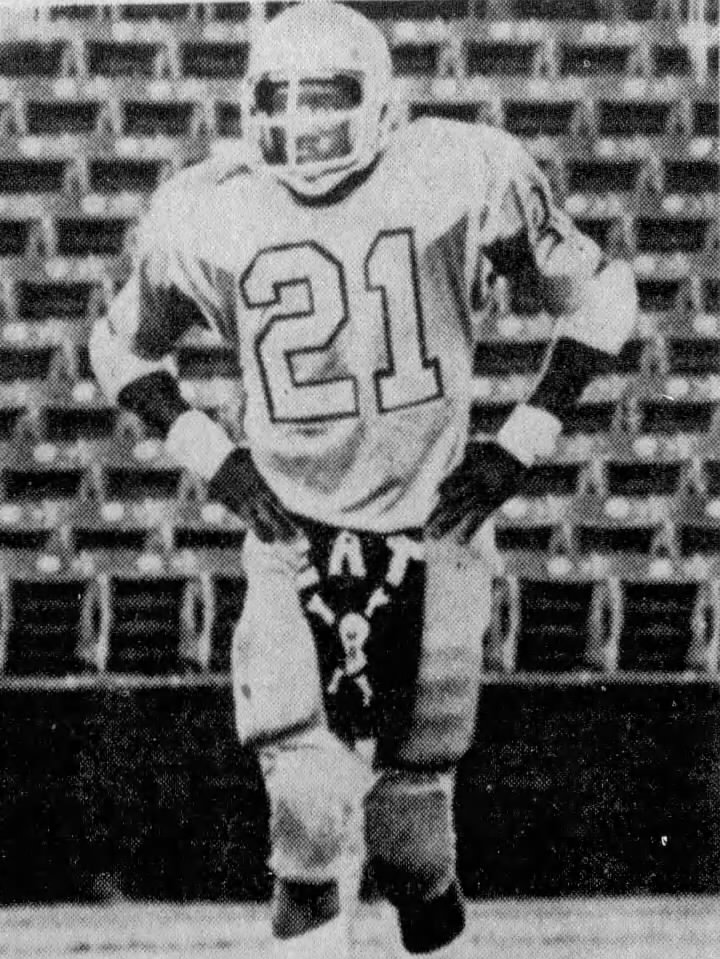
- Edwards in 1976, sporting his signature skull-and-crossbones towel

No. 21
- Positions: Defensive back; Safety

Personal information
- Born: 1953 or 1954 (age 72–73)
- Listed height: 6 ft 0 in (1.83 m)
- Listed weight: 180 lb (82 kg)

Career information
- High school: J. W. North (Riverside, California)
- College: Riverside; UCLA
- NFL draft: 1977: undrafted

Career history
- Los Angeles Rams (1977)*
- * Offseason or practice squad member only

Awards and highlights
- First-team All-American (1976); First-team All-Pac-8 (1976); Second-team All-Pac-8 (1975)

Oscar Edwards (c. 1953/1954) is an American educator, businessman, and former defensive back for the UCLA Bruins. Nicknamed "Dr. Death," Edwards was known as a hard-hitting player during his time in college. After graduating, he became an advisor to small businesses and an advocate for diversity, equity, and inclusion in STEM education.

== Early life ==
Oscar Edwards was born into a family of nine children. His parents divorced when he was 6 years old, and he was raised by his mother. Edwards worked as a child to support his family financially. His brother, Cleveland Edwards, inspired him to participate in athletics in high school. Cleveland, who was being held at Soledad State Prison, died after being shot in a 1970 prison riot.

Edwards attended J. W. North High School in Riverside, California. He played both basketball and football. He played quarterback, being named to the West All-Stars team for Riverside County. He wore tennis shoes for his first three weeks of practice while waiting to purchase actual used football shoes. While in high school his team primarily ran a wishbone formation, which led to Edwards growing tired of playing offense in favor of defense.

== College career ==
Edwards spent his first two years of university at Riverside City College, a local junior college. He arrived at a time when head coach Al Fages needed to rely on support from the first year members of the team. While a freshman, Edwards broke a bone in his chest during a game and had to be taken away by ambulance during halftime. The injury bruised his heart.

When Edwards transferred to the University of California, Los Angeles, in 1974, he was redshirtted his first year. He was surprised by the decision, as he didn't know he'd be sitting out until the start of the school year. Edwards started at defensive back the next year. UCLA would go on to win the 1976 Rose Bowl after the 1975 season in a 23–10 upset against the Ohio State Buckeyes. Edwards was credited as an important part of the win.

While at UCLA, his coaches described him as the best strong safety in the Pacific 8. He was given the Donn Moomaw Award for outstanding defensive player in 1975, and he was named to the first team defense of the Associated Press Pacific-8 and All-West Coast teams in 1976. He was named a first team All-American defensive back by United Press International later that same year.

=== Nickname ===
During his time at UCLA, Edwards was nicknamed "Dr. Death". He received the name from Rick Walker, who gave nicknames to many other players on the team. The nickname came from his style of physicality and hard hitting tackles, with Edwards saying he was "out to punish people anytime, anywhere."

His friend, Nancy Biddle, stitched a black towel with the word "death" inscribed alongside a skull and crossbones symbol for Edwards to wear during games. This was in an effort to bring Edwards more publicity and give UCLA's defense a sense of identity. The towel was credited as an important part of his image throughout his college career. During the fourth quarter of UCLA's Rose Bowl, the towel was stolen by an Ohio State player after a pile-up and was not returned.

== Professional career ==
Edwards did not show interest in professional football while he was in college. When asked if he was interested in playing in the NFL, Edwards replied "if someone is interested, I will be too. But I'm not putting my entire emotions into it." He was not picked in the 1977 NFL draft.

In May 1977, the Los Angeles Rams signed Edwards as a defensive back. He was injured before the season began and was waived shortly afterwards.

== Educational career ==
After his ill-fated NFL career, Edwards attempted to finish his economics degree with UCLA. Edwards had stated that he wanted to pursue real estate after he graduated. While in college, his coaches advised him to pursue a sociology degree instead so that he could focus on football. His grades suffered during his time with the team, to the point where a secretary told him he would "never get back to school" at UCLA. After negotiating with the dean, Edwards went on to finish his bachelor's degree at UCLA. He would later write a term paper accusing the NCAA of holding a monopsony.

After graduation, Edwards became the vice president of a management consultant company. He went on to earn his Masters in Business Administration from UCLA in 1981 before doing doctoral studies at Grand Canyon University. He earned his doctorate in 2022. Edwards has served as CEO and president of Higher Growth Strategies, a business that focuses on advising small businesses and non-profits on their management. He also serves as president of the Diversity Equity Inclusion Group, who promote DEI education for African-Americans in STEM. He has taught classes at Long Beach City College and Los Angeles City College.

== Personal life ==
Edwards married in 1982. While in college, he volunteered at a youth detention center, a teenage rehabilitation camp, and for Special Olympics. He denounced his old playing style in 2023 after seeing the impacts of football on his two sons.
