= Donnis Churchwell =

American football player (1936–2010)

No. 77, 72, 75
- Positions: Offensive tackle, defensive tackle

Personal information
- Born: May 11, 1936; Leakesville, Mississippi, U.S.
- Died: January 22, 2010 (aged 73); Leakesville, Mississippi, U.S.
- Listed height: 6 ft 0 in (1.83 m)
- Listed weight: 220 lb (100 kg)

Career information
- High school: George County (Lucedale, Mississippi)
- College: Mississippi
- NFL draft: 1959: 5th round, 60th overall pick

Career history
- Washington Redskins (1959); Oakland Raiders (1960)

Career NFL/AFL statistics
- Fumble recoveries: 1
- Stats at Pro Football Reference

Donnis Hanson Churchwell (May 11, 1936 – January 22, 2010), nicknamed "Bull", was an American football offensive tackle in the National Football League (NFL) for the Washington Redskins. He also played for the Oakland Raiders of the American Football League.

Churchwell was from Leakesville, Mississippi, the son of Rush Churchwell and Lois Churchwell Fagan. He played college football at the University of Mississippi for the Ole Miss Rebels and was drafted 60th overall in the fifth round of the 1959 NFL draft by the Baltimore Colts. He played for the Washington Redskins in 1959, and signed with the Oakland Raiders in 1960. He worked for a Mississippi railroad for thirty years after his sports career.

Churchwell married Judith Marie Roberts in 1958. They had three daughters. He died in 2010, at age 73, at Greene County Hospital in his hometown.
