= Mike Fultz =

American football player (born 1954)

No. 72
- Position: Defensive tackle

Personal information
- Born: January 28, 1954 (age 72); Lincoln, Nebraska, U.S.
- Listed height: 6 ft 5 in (1.96 m)
- Listed weight: 278 lb (126 kg)

Career information
- High school: Lincoln
- College: Nebraska
- NFL draft: 1977: 2nd round, 34th overall pick

Career history
- New Orleans Saints (1977–1980); Miami Dolphins (1981); Baltimore Colts (1981)

Awards and highlights
- First-team All-American (1976); First-team All-Big Eight (1976); Second-team All-Big Eight (1975)

Career NFL statistics
- Sacks: 9.5
- Stats at Pro Football Reference

Michael Dwayne Fultz (born January 28, 1954) is an American former professional football player who was a defensive lineman for four seasons with the New Orleans Saints, Baltimore Colts, and Miami Dolphins of the National Football League (NFL). He played college football for the Nebraska Cornhuskers. Fultz was selected in the second round of the 1977 NFL draft with the 34th overall pick. Upon retirement from the NFL, he was as an assistant coach of the Lincoln High School (Lincoln, Nebraska) varsity football team. He then served as the varsity team's head coach for five seasons. He resigned as the head coach at the conclusion of the 2010 season. He was an automotive teacher at Lincoln High School.
