= Wichita Southeast High School =

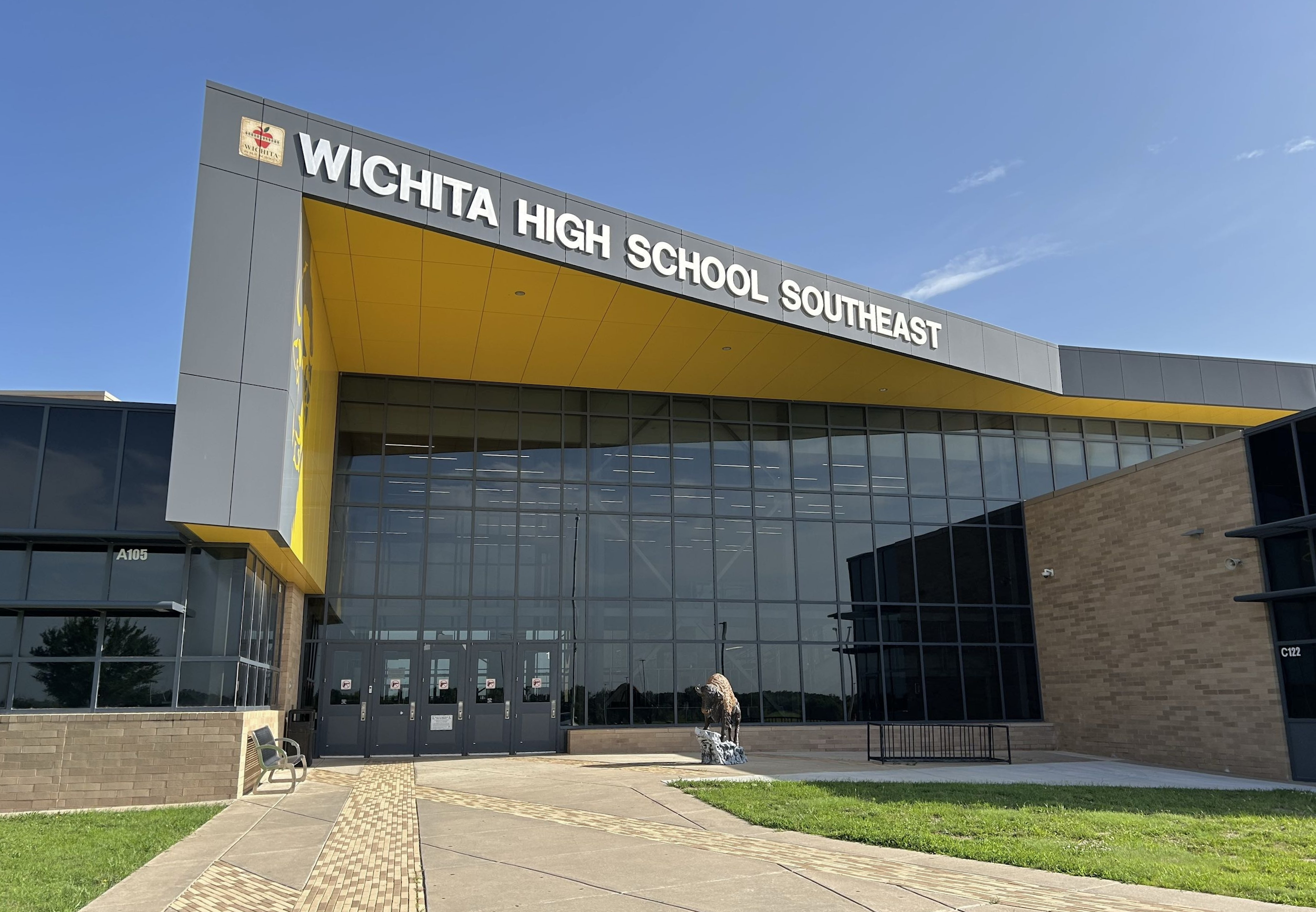
- Wichita Southeast High School in 2026

Location
- 2641 S 127th St E Wichita, Kansas 67210; United States; 37.646260°N 97.192655°W

Information
- School type: Public, high school
- Established: 1957
- School board: Wichita USD 259 district school board
- School district: Wichita USD 259
- CEEB code: 173208
- Principal: Connie Redic
- Teaching staff: 112.43 (FTE)
- Grades: 9 to 12
- Gender: Mixed-sex education, coed
- Enrollment: 1,973 (2023–2024)
- Student to teacher ratio: 17.55
- Campus type: Urban
- Colors: Gold; White; Black (accent)
- Athletics: Class 6A
- Athletics conference: Greater Wichita Athletic League
- Mascot: Golden Buffalo
- Newspaper: The Stampede
- Yearbook: The Hoofbeats
- Website: southeast.usd259.org

Wichita Southeast High School, known locally as Southeast, is a public secondary school in Wichita, Kansas, United States. It is operated by Wichita USD 259 school district and serves students in grades 9 to 12. Southeast is one of many high schools located within the city limits of Wichita. The official school colors are gold and black. The enrollment for the 2009–2010 school year is approximately 2,000 students.

Wichita Southeast was established in 1957 in order to help educate the growing population of southeastern Wichita. Wichita Southeast is a member of the Kansas State High School Activities Association and offers a variety of sports programs. Athletic teams compete in the 6A division and are known as the "Golden Buffaloes". Extracurricular activities are also offered in the form of performing arts, school publications, and clubs.

== History ==
=== Old school ===
Southeast High School was established in 1957, at 903 S. Edgemoor St, in order to help educate the increasing population of southeastern Wichita. Southeast's colors were originally chosen to be gold and white; however, the colors usually represented on uniforms and Southeast-related products are black and gold. Southeast's symbol and mascot is the Golden Buffalo, chosen because of the Buffalo's historical significance to the region.

=== New school ===
On September 29, 2014, Wichita school district broke ground for the new Southeast High School near 127th East and Pawnee.

== Academics ==
Southeast High School maintains a student to teacher ratio of approximately 20:1, significantly higher than the state average of 14:1. Many students at Southeast are members of the National Honor Society, and even more are given local awards like Student of the Month and the Tatanka Award, which is recognition for students who consistently demonstrate performance beyond standard expectations over the course of an entire school year.

Advancement Via Individual Determination (AVID), has a new-found home in this Wichita public high school. Making its beginnings at Southeast in 2005, AVID has helped and is helping students succeed in high school, college, and beyond. The Class of 2009 marked the first graduating AVID class of Southeast.

== Extracurricular activities ==
The Buffaloes compete in the Greater Wichita Athletic League and are classified as a 6A school, the largest classification in Kansas according to the Kansas State High School Activities Association. Throughout its history, Wichita Southeast has won 51 state championships in various sports. Several graduates have gone on to participate in collegiate and professional athletics.

=== Athletics ===
Each head coach at Southeast is also a classroom teacher, representing ten different curriculum areas. Combined, the coaches have a total of 320 years of coaching experience as of February 2007. Southeast offers 20 different sports, the most in the Greater Wichita City League, representing every sport sponsored by the state. In 2007, 289 boys and 229 girls represented Southeast as members of athletic teams - the most of any school in Wichita.

In 1998, the school's girls' soccer team won the Titan Classic. Both girls' track and field and boys' football and basketball also claimed city league titles in that year. The following year, the boys' basketball team won the 6A state championship. In 2003, both the boys' swimming and basketball teams took state titles. In 2006, the school's boys' soccer team won the Titan Classic and made a run at state for the first time in eight years. In 2008, the boys' basketball team won the Class 6A title, defeating Lawrence High School 88–67. In the last 40 years, Southeast has won over 100 league championships (more than any City League school) and over 40 state championships in boys' competition, and over 40 league championships and 10 state championships in girls' competition.

==== Baseball ====
The baseball program has won a total of five state championships. The most recent occurred in 1978 when the Buffaloes beat Shawnee Mission South 6–3 in the state title game to become state champions.

=== State championships ===
State Championships
Season	Sport	Number of Championships	Year
Fall	Football	4	1976, 1977, 1978, 1980
Fall	Cross Country, Boys	3	1970, 1976, 1980
Winter	Swimming and Diving, Boys	8	1964, 1969, 1970, 1971, 1973, 1976, 1977, 2003
Winter	Basketball, Boys	4	1971, 1999, 2003, 2008
Winter	Basketball, Girls	2	1986, 1987
Spring	Golf, Boys	8	1963, 1964, 1966, 1970, 1976, 1979, 1996, 2007
Spring	Baseball	5	1965, 1971, 1973, 1976, 1978
Spring	Tennis, Boys	8	1979, 1983, 1984, 1987, 1988, 1990, 1991, 1992
Spring	Tennis, Girls	7	1983, 1985, 1986, 1987, 1991, 1997, 1998
Spring	Track & Field, Boys	2	1971, 1997
Spring	Track & Field, Girls	1	1990
Total		52	

=== Arts ===
A number of students at Southeast are involved in artistic studies, such as instrumentation, singing, acting, dancing, and painting. The band split into two levels as of the 2009–2010 school year. Both participate in marching band in the fall and in the winter time they split into the Wind Ensemble and Concert Band. In 2004, the jazz band was invited to play for guests at the Walt Disney World Resort in Florida. Southeast is home to many musical/theater productions, run mostly by student members of the International Thespian Society. Three main stage shows are performed each year, along with smaller shows that showcase student-written one-acts.

At the end of each school year, Goldust - the combined performance of all the choirs and the jazz band - acts as a farewell to the senior class. Goldust comprises many short skits and musical renditions, often performed strictly by graduating seniors. But select juniors and sophomores are also allowed opportunities to perform solos.

Southeast choirs include Madrigals, Concert Choir, Women's Ensemble, and Mixed Chorus. Madrigals is the top choir at Southeast. They also perform at city and state level competitions in the spring, where ratings range from I-V, I being outstanding. Requirements are upper classmen, audition only. Madrigals is a 24 student class.

Concert Choir is the main large choir at Southeast, and also performs at the city and state levels. Concert choir is an audition only choir and is open to sophomore boys, juniors and seniors. Sophomore girls may audition for Women's Ensemble.

Women's Ensemble performs at the City and State level, and sometimes perform alongside the Madrigals. This is an audition only group ranging from sophomores to seniors.

Mixed Chorus is a choir open to any one trying out the choir field in Southeast, and no audition is necessary. It teaches the individuals who join how to sing as a unit. This choir performs only at school concerts, and is usually the first step to advancing up the choir scale at Southeast.

=== Journalism ===
"The Stampede" is the Southeast newspaper. It is distributed every three weeks. "The Hoofbeats" is the name of the Southeast yearbook, which is distributed every year. As of 2009, both are currently in their 52nd year of publication. As of the 2009–2010 school year, The Stampede is rated "All-Kansas" by the KSPA.

== Notable alumni ==
- Class of 1962, Dan Glickman, Congressman Kansas 4th District 1977–1995, president and CEO of the Motion Picture Association of America as of 2019, United States Secretary of Agriculture under Bill Clinton
- Class of 1964, Wink Hartman, oilman, restaurateur, and political candidate
- Class of 1969, Kirstie Alley, actress (Cheers, Veronica's Closet)
- Class of 1970, Tom Otterness, internationally recognized sculptor, first ever sculptor asked to design a float (Humpty Dumpty) for the Macy's Thanksgiving Day Parade
- Class of 1973, Laverne Smith, former NFL player
- Class of 1980, Marshall Poe, historian, writer
- Class of 1980, Jeff Smith, former Nebraska Cornhuskers and Kansas City Chiefs running back
- Class of 1988, Lou Montulli, author of Lynx (web browser) and inventor of HTTP cookie
- Class of 1989, Michael Engel, paleontologist, entomologist, author of Evolution of the Insects
- Class of 1992, David Stras, Judge United States Court of Appeals for the Eighth Circuit
- Class of 1999, Rashad Washington, former all-state running back, Kansas State Wildcats defensive back, former NFL player for the New York Jets
- Class of 2000, Chris Mann, Vanderbilt University alumnus and finalist on the second season of the American reality talent show, The Voice
- Class of 2010, Joseph Randle, former Oklahoma State Cowboys and Dallas Cowboys running back

== See also ==
- Education in Kansas
- List of high schools in Kansas
- List of unified school districts in Kansas
