= Truett Smith =

American football player (1924–2000)

No. 30
- Position: Back

Personal information
- Born: March 17, 1924; New Orleans, Louisiana, U.S.
- Died: December 29, 2000 (aged 76); Jackson, Mississippi, U.S.
- Listed height: 6 ft 2 in (1.88 m)
- Listed weight: 208 lb (94 kg)

Career information
- High school: Hazlehurst (Hazlehurst, Mississippi)
- College: Mississippi State (1946–1948); Wyoming (1949)
- NFL draft: 1950: 7th round, 86th overall pick

Career history
- Pittsburgh Steelers (1950–1951)

Career NFL statistics
- Rushing yards: 1
- Rushing average: 1
- Receptions: 4
- Receiving yards: 71
- Stats at Pro Football Reference

Truett Henry Smith (March 17, 1924 – December 29, 2000) was an American professional football player who was a blocking back for two seasons with the Pittsburgh Steelers of the National Football League (NFL). He was also selected by the Steelers in the seventh round of the 1950 NFL draft. He played college football for the Mississippi State Bulldogs and Wyoming Cowboys.

== Early life and college ==
Truett Henry Smith was born on March 17, 1924, in New Orleans, Louisiana. He attended Hazlehurst High School in Hazlehurst, Mississippi.

Smith first played college football for the Bulldogs of Mississippi State University, lettering three years from 1946 to 1948. He then transferred to the University of Wyoming, where he was a letterman for the Cowboys in 1949.

== Professional career ==
Smith was selected by the Chicago Bears in the 32nd round, with the 297th overall pick, of the 1948 NFL draft. However, this selection was later declared ineligible. He was then selected by the Pittsburgh Steelers in the seventh round, with the 86th overall pick, of the 1950 NFL draft. Smith played in nine games for the Steelers during the 1950 season. He appeared in 11 games, starting eight, in 1951, catching four passes for 71 yards while also rushing once for one yard. He was released by the Steelers on September 1, 1952.

== Personal life ==
Smith's brother Allen Smith played for the Chicago Bears. He died on December 29, 2000. in Jackson, Mississippi.
