= Walter Packer =

American football player (born 1955)

No. 30, 40
- Position: Defensive back

Personal information
- Born: November 7, 1955 (age 70); Leakesville, Mississippi, U.S.
- Listed height: 5 ft 10 in (1.78 m)
- Listed weight: 174 lb (79 kg)

Career information
- High school: Leakesville (Mississippi)
- College: Mississippi State (1973–1976)
- NFL draft: 1977: 8th round, 203rd overall pick

Career history
- Atlanta Falcons (1977)*; Seattle Seahawks (1977); Tampa Bay Buccaneers (1977); Winnipeg Blue Bombers (1979)*
- * Offseason or practice squad member only

Awards and highlights
- First-team All-SEC (1974); Second-team All-SEC (1975)
- Stats at Pro Football Reference

Walter Packer (born November 7, 1955) is an American former professional football defensive back who played one season in the National Football League (NFL) with the Seattle Seahawks and Tampa Bay Buccaneers. He was selected by the Atlanta Falcons in the eighth round of the 1977 NFL draft after playing college football at Mississippi State University, where he was a running back.

== Early life ==
Walter Packer was born on November 7, 1955, in Leakesville, Mississippi. He attended Leakesville High School in Leakesville.

== College career ==
Packer was a four-year letterman for the Mississippi State Bulldogs of Mississippi State University from 1973 to 1976. He rushed 50 times for 181 yards and one touchdown his freshman year in 1973 while also catching two passes for 54 yards. In 1974, he recorded 157 carries for 994 yards and six touchdowns, and five receptions for 35 yards. Packers led the Southeastern Conference (SEC) in rushing yards that season and earned Associated Press (AP) first-team All-SEC honors. In 1975, he totaled 180 rushing attempts for 1,012 yards and seven touchdowns while catching five passes for 67 yards, garnering AP second-team All-SEC recognition. As a senior in 1976, he recorded 96 carries for 633 yards and six touchdowns, one reception for 15 yards, and 12 kick returns for 195 yards. Packer's 6.6 yards per carry were the most in the SEC that year. On March 21, 1977, Packer was presented with a resolution adopted by both the Mississippi House of Representatives and Senate praising him for his college career. Packer's 2,820 rushing yards were the second most in SEC history at the time. He was inducted into Mississippi State University's athletics hall of fame in 2005.

== Professional career ==
Packer was selected by the Atlanta Falcons in the eighth round, with the 203rd overall pick, of the 1977 NFL draft as a wide receiver. He officially signed with the Falcons on June 21. He was waived on August 25, 1977.

Packer signed with the Seattle Seahawks on September 16, 1977. He was listed as a defensive back during the 1977 season and appeared in ten games while returning 13 kicks for 280 yards and 20 punts for 131 yards. He was released by the Seahawks on November 28, 1977.

Packer was signed by the Tampa Bay Buccaneers on December 13, 1977. He played in one game for the Buccaneers but did not record any statistics. He was released on August 30, 1978.

Packer signed with the Winnipeg Blue Bombers of the Canadian Football League in March 1979. He was released later in 1979.
