= Stan Black =

American football player (1955–2018)

No. 36 (college #)
- Position: Defensive back

Personal information
- Born: November 12, 1955; Greenville, Mississippi, U.S.
- Died: August 24, 2018 (aged 62); Madison, Mississippi, U.S.
- Listed height: 6 ft 0 in (1.83 m)
- Listed weight: 196 lb (89 kg)

Career information
- High school: Columbus (MS) Heritage Academy
- College: Mississippi State
- NFL draft: 1977: 4th round, 100th overall pick

Career history
- San Francisco 49ers (1977)

Awards and highlights
- Second-team All-American (1976); First-team All-SEC (1976); Second-team All-SEC (1975)
- Stats at Pro Football Reference

Stanley Ross Black (November 12, 1955 – August 24, 2018) was an American football defensive back. He played for the San Francisco 49ers in 1977.

Stan was a member of the 1976 Playboy All-America team.

He died after being hit by a motorist on August 24, 2018, in Madison, Mississippi at age 62.
