= Mike Butler (American football) =

American football player (born 1954)

No. 77
- Position: Defensive end

Personal information
- Born: April 4, 1954 (age 72); Washington, D.C., U.S.
- Listed height: 6 ft 5 in (1.96 m)
- Listed weight: 265 lb (120 kg)

Career information
- High school: Calvin Coolidge (Washington, D.C.)
- College: Kansas
- NFL draft: 1977: 1st round, 9th overall pick

Career history
- Green Bay Packers (1977–1982); Tampa Bay Bandits (1984–1985); Green Bay Packers (1985)

Awards and highlights
- PFWA All-Rookie Team (1977); First-team All-Big Eight (1975); Second-team All-Big Eight (1976)

Career NFL statistics
- Sacks: 41.5
- Fumble recoveries: 3
- Defensive TDs: 1
- Stats at Pro Football Reference

Michael Anthony Butler (born April 4, 1954) is an American former professional football player who was a defensive end for seven seasons with the Green Bay Packers of the National Football League (NFL). He was drafted ninth overall in the first round of the 1977 NFL Draft by the Packers. He also played two seasons for the Tampa Bay Bandits of the United States Football League (USFL).
