= Gary Spani =

American football player (born 1956)

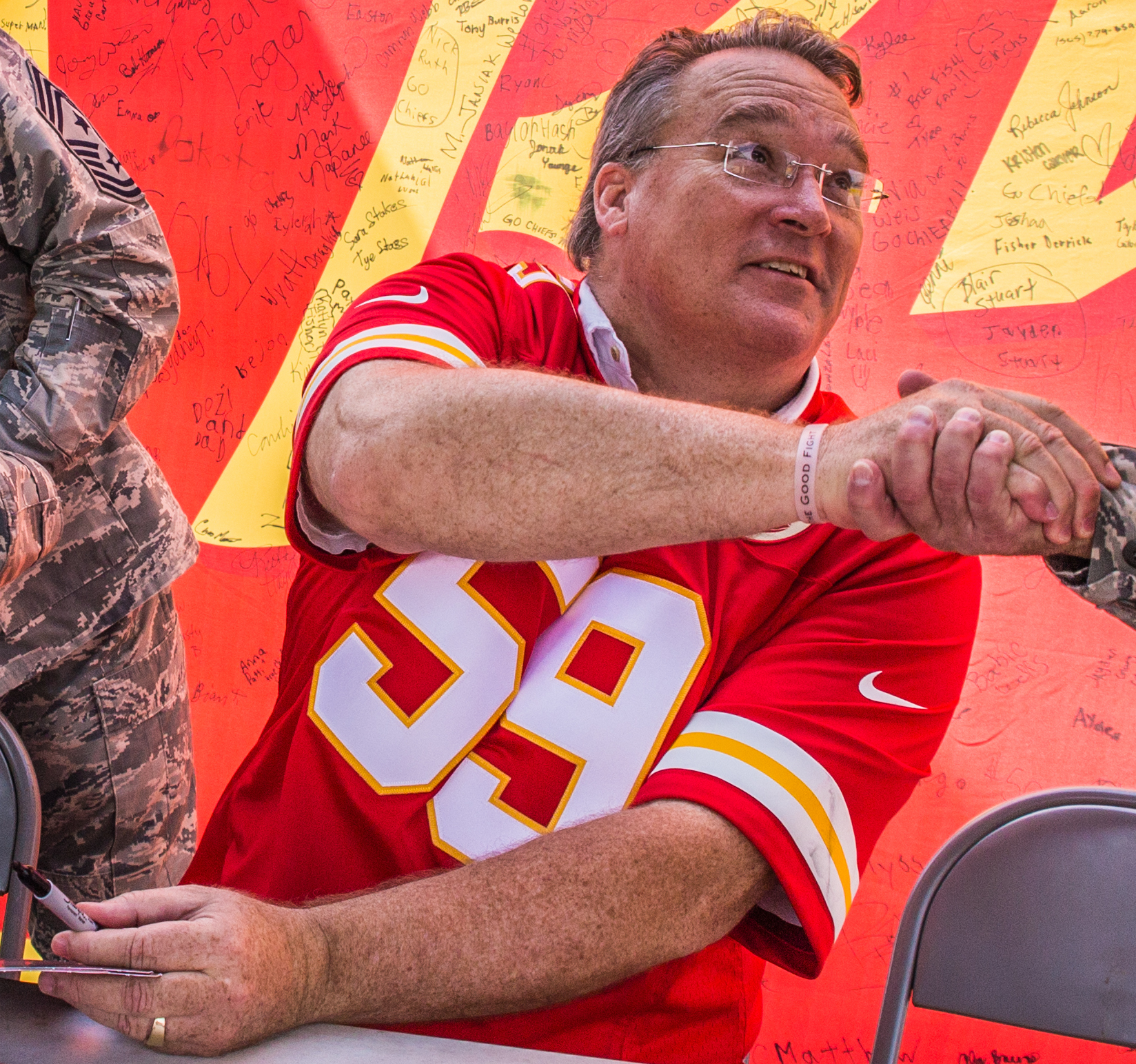
- Spani at Rosecrans Air National Guard Base in 2017

No. 59
- Position: Linebacker

Personal information
- Born: January 9, 1956 (age 70); Satanta, Kansas, U.S.
- Listed height: 6 ft 2 in (1.88 m)
- Listed weight: 229 lb (104 kg)

Career information
- High school: Manhattan (Manhattan, Kansas)
- College: Kansas State
- NFL draft: 1978: 3rd round, 58th overall pick

Career history
- Kansas City Chiefs (1978–1986)

Awards and highlights
- Kansas City Chiefs Hall of Fame (2003); Consensus All-American (1977); Third-team All-American (1975); 2× First-team All-Big Eight (1975, 1977); Second-team All-Big Eight (1976); Kansas State Hall of Fame (2000)

Career NFL statistics
- Sacks: 9.5
- Fumble recoveries: 10
- Interceptions: 2
- Stats at Pro Football Reference
- College Football Hall of Fame

Gary Spani (born January 9, 1956) is an American former professional football player who was a linebacker for the Kansas City Chiefs of the National Football League (NFL) from 1978 to 1986. He has worked for the Chiefs' front office since 1989, and was the directors of community engagement for the Chiefs.

Spani was born in Satanta, Kansas, but raised in Manhattan, Kansas, and graduated from Manhattan High School. He played college football for the Kansas State Wildcats. At Kansas State University, he was a three-time All Big Eight Conference selection, was conference defensive player of the year in 1977, and was named the school's first consensus All American in 1977. He still holds the all-time tackles record for Kansas State University. Following graduation, Spani was named MVP of the East-West Shrine Game.

The Chiefs selected Spani in the third round of the 1978 NFL draft. As a professional, Spani was a hardnosed and tenacious player. He was a team captain for the Chiefs in 1983. He formerly held the all-time tackles record for the Kansas City Chiefs, where he registered 999 career stops. His single-season record of 157 tackles with the Chiefs, set in 1979, stood until 2002 when it was broken by Mike Maslowski. He also recorded 9.5 sacks, recovered 10 fumbles and scored 4 touchdowns during his Chiefs career.

Spani was elected to the College Football Hall of Fame in 2002 and the Kansas City Chiefs Hall of Fame in 2003.

Daughter Shalin Spani played college basketball for the Kansas State University Wildcats from 2007 to 2010. She later married K-State star quarterback and Heisman Trophy finalist Collin Klein. Daughter Taber Spani played college basketball for the Tennessee Lady Vols. His third daughter, Tanis Spani, was a member of the Southwest Baptist University Lady Bearcat basketball team.
