= Larry Seivers =

American football player (born 1954)

Profile
- Position: Wide receiver

Personal information
- Born: March 30, 1954 (age 72); Clinton, Tennessee, U.S.

Career information
- High school: Clinton
- College: Tennessee
- NFL draft: 1977: 4th round, 111th overall pick

Career history
- Seattle Seahawks (1977)*; Tampa Bay Buccaneers (1977)*
- * Offseason or practice squad member only

Awards and highlights
- 2× Consensus All-American (1975, 1976); 2× First-team All-SEC (1975, 1976); SEC Male Athlete of the Year (1977)

Larry Seivers (born March 30, 1954) is an American former football player who was a wide receiver for the Tennessee Volunteers. He was a consensus All-American in 1975 and 1976. He was selected by the Seattle Seahawks of the National Football League (NFL) in the fourth round of the 1977 NFL draft.

== Early life ==
Born in Clinton, Tennessee, Seivers played high school football and basketball at Clinton High School.

== College career ==
Seivers played for the Tennessee Volunteers from 1974 to 1976. He accumulated 117 receptions, 1,924 receiving yards and eight receiving touchdowns in his career. At the time he was the University of Tennessee's all-time leader in receptions and receiving yards. He was a two time consensus All-American in 1975 and 1976. Seivers scored the only touchdown of the 1974 Liberty Bowl, catching an 11-yard pass from Randy Wallace, in a 7–3 victory over Maryland. He was a captain on the 1976 Tennessee Volunteers football team. He was selected as an SEC Football Legend in 2005. Seivers was inducted into the Tennessee Sports Hall of Fame in 2013.

== Professional career ==
Sievers was drafted in the fourth round by the Seattle Seahawks of the NFL with the 111th pick in the 1977 NFL draft. He was traded to the Tampa Bay Buccaneers on August 30, 1977, for a fourth round 1979 NFL draft choice. The draft pick received by the Seahawks was given to the Buffalo Bills as voluntary compensation for Ahmad Rashad signing in 1976.
