= Ray Costict =

American football player (1955–2012)

No. 55
- Position: Linebacker

Personal information
- Born: March 19, 1955; Moss Point, Mississippi, U.S.
- Died: January 3, 2012 (aged 56); Orlando, Florida, U.S.
- Listed height: 6 ft 0 in (1.83 m)
- Listed weight: 217 lb (98 kg)

Career information
- High school: Moss Point
- College: Mississippi State
- NFL draft: 1977: 11th round, 303rd overall pick

Career history
- New England Patriots (1977–1979); New Jersey Generals (1983)

Awards and highlights
- Third-team All-American (1976); First-team All-SEC (1976); Second-team All-SEC (1975)

Career NFL statistics
- Sacks: 3
- Fumble recoveries: 4
- Interceptions: 1
- Stats at Pro Football Reference

Ray Costict (March 19, 1955 – January 3, 2012) was an American professional football player who was a linebacker for the New England Patriots of the National Football League (NFL) from 1977 to 1979. Costict played college football for the Mississippi State Bulldogs before being selected 303rd overall in the 11th round by the Patriots.

He is Mississippi State's career leader in tackles with 467.
