= Don Hasselbeck =

American football player (1955–2025)

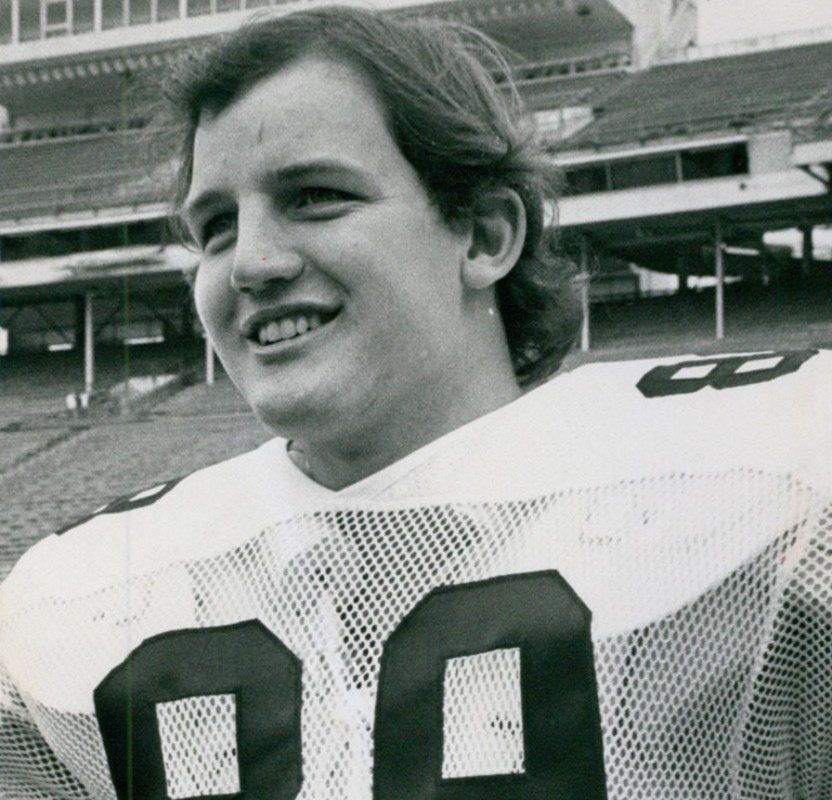
- Hasselbeck in 1976

No. 80, 87, 88, 85
- Position: Tight end

Personal information
- Born: April 1, 1955; Cincinnati, Ohio, U.S.
- Died: April 14, 2025 (aged 70)
- Listed height: 6 ft 7 in (2.01 m)
- Listed weight: 245 lb (111 kg)

Career information
- High school: La Salle (Cincinnati)
- College: Colorado
- NFL draft: 1977: 2nd round, 52nd overall pick

Career history
- New England Patriots (1977–1983); Los Angeles Raiders (1983); Minnesota Vikings (1984); New York Giants (1985)

Awards and highlights
- Super Bowl champion (XVIII); PFWA All-Rookie Team (1977); Second-team All-American (1975); 2× First-team All-Big Eight (1975, 1976); CU Athletics Hall Of Fame inductee (2024)

Career NFL statistics
- Receptions: 107
- Receiving yards: 1,542
- Receiving touchdowns: 18
- Stats at Pro Football Reference

Donald William Hasselbeck (April 1, 1955 – April 14, 2025) was an American professional football player who was a tight end in the National Football League (NFL) for the New England Patriots, Los Angeles Raiders, Minnesota Vikings, and the New York Giants. He played college football for the Colorado Buffaloes, earning second-team All-American honors in 1975. Hasselbeck was selected in the second round of the 1977 NFL draft. He won a Super Bowl with the Raiders in the 1983 season.

== Early life ==
Born to John William Hasselbeck and Molly M. (née Lang) Hasselbeck, he was raised in Cincinnati, Ohio, Hasselbeck attended La Salle High School, where he was an all-city selection in both football and basketball. He played college football at Colorado, where he majored in Fine Arts. He is currently ranked 36th on the all-time receptions list at CU.

== Professional career ==
In the 1977 NFL draft, Hasselbeck was selected late in the second round (52nd overall) by the New England Patriots (11–3 in 1976), where he played the first six seasons of his nine-year NFL career. In 1981, he started fourteen games and led the Patriots in receptions with 46, to go along with 808 yards and six touchdowns.

Early in the 1983 season, Hasselbeck was traded to the Los Angeles Raiders; in Super Bowl XVIII against defending champion Washington in January 1984, he blocked an extra point attempt in the third quarter as the Raiders rolled in a 38–9 rout. Before retiring, Hasselbeck played for the Minnesota Vikings in 1984 and the New York Giants in 1985; he scored the final touchdown of the Giants' season in a 17–3 NFC Wild Card victory at home over the San Francisco 49ers, the defending champions. (The following week on the road, the Giants were shut out 21–0 by the top-seeded Chicago Bears, the eventual champions.)

== Personal life ==
Hasselbeck was married to Mary Beth "Betsy" (Rueve) Hasselbeck. He was the father of former NFL quarterback Matt Hasselbeck, formerly the starter for the Seattle Seahawks. Matt played on the Seahawks with Lofa Tatupu, who himself was the son of Don's teammate Mosi Tatupu.

Hasselbeck's second son Tim Hasselbeck was an NFL backup quarterback who currently works for ESPN as a Fantasy Football analyst and is married to Elisabeth Hasselbeck. His third son, Nathanael Nicolas (born 1981), played wide receiver at Boston College and the University of Massachusetts.

== Death ==
Hasselbeck died after going into cardiac arrest at his home on April 14, 2025, at the age of 70.
