= Warren Bryant (American football) =

American football player (1955–2021)

No. 66
- Position: Offensive tackle

Personal information
- Born: November 11, 1955; Miami, Florida, U.S.
- Died: October 10, 2021 (aged 65); Smyrna, Georgia, U.S.
- Listed height: 6 ft 6 in (1.98 m)
- Listed weight: 273 lb (124 kg)

Career information
- High school: Miami Edison
- College: Kentucky
- NFL draft: 1977: 1st round, 6th overall pick

Career history
- Atlanta Falcons (1977–1984); Los Angeles Raiders (1984)

Awards and highlights
- PFWA All-Rookie Team (1977); First-team All-American (1976); Jacobs Blocking Trophy (1976); 3× First-team All-SEC (1974–1976)

Career NFL statistics
- Games played: 104
- Games started: 94
- Stats at Pro Football Reference

Warren Bryant (November 11, 1955 – October 10, 2021) was an American professional football player who was an offensive tackle from 1977 through 1984 in the National Football League (NFL). He played college football for the Kentucky Wildcats. He was selected by the Atlanta Falcons in the first round of the 1977 NFL draft with the sixth overall pick. He was a fan favorite, and he made many personal appearances in and around the Atlanta area. Bryant was inducted into the Kentucky Pro Football Hall of Fame in 2016.

Bryant died on October 10, 2021, in Smyrna, Georgia. He was 65.
