= Charley Hannah =

American football player (born 1955)

- Hannah at the 2013 BCS National Championship Game at Sun Life Stadium.

No. 73
- Position: Offensive guard / defensive end

Personal information
- Born: July 26, 1955 (age 71); Canton, Georgia, U.S.
- Listed height: 6 ft 5 in (1.96 m)
- Listed weight: 260 lb (118 kg)

Career information
- High school: Baylor (Chattanooga, Tennessee)
- College: Alabama
- NFL draft: 1977: 3rd round, 57th overall pick

Career history
- Tampa Bay Buccaneers (1977–1982); Los Angeles Raiders (1983–1988)

Awards and highlights
- Super Bowl champion (XVIII); First-team All-SEC (1976)

Career NFL statistics
- Games played: 148
- Games started: 126
- Fumble recoveries: 3
- Stats at Pro Football Reference

Charles Alvin Hannah (born July 26, 1955) is an American former professional football player who was an offensive guard and defensive end in the National Football League (NFL) from 1977 to 1988. Charley played six years for the Tampa Bay Buccaneers and six years for the Los Angeles Raiders. He is the son of an NFL player, Herbert (Herb) Hannah, an offensive lineman for the Alabama Crimson Tide, who played a year at tackle for the New York Giants in 1951. His brothers John, a Pro Football Hall of Famer, and David were also All-Conference offensive linemen for the University of Alabama.

Replacing Curt Marsh, Hannah was the starting left guard for the Raiders from 1983 to 1986, but played more sparingly in his final two years. At that position, he opened gaping holes with his linemates against the Washington Redskins, so that Marcus Allen gained a whopping 191 yards on the ground on 20 carries, to help the Raiders win Super Bowl XVIII.
