= New England Patriots all-time roster =

1,456 players have appeared in at least one regular season or postseason game in the National Football League (NFL) or American Football League (AFL) for the New England Patriots franchise since 1960. This list is accurate through the end of the 2025 NFL season.

== A ==
- Rabih Abdullah
- Bobby Abrams
- Ron Acks
- Bob Adams
- George Adams
- Julius Adams
- Phillip Adams
- Sam Adams Sr.
- Titus Adams
- Tucker Addington
- Tom Addison
- Nelson Agholor
- Ray Agnew
- Danny Aiken
- Kamar Aiken
- Sam Aiken
- Hakim Akbar
- Chris Akins
- Eric Alexander
- Rogers Alexander
- Don Allard
- Dwayne Allen
- Marvin Allen
- Ryan Allen
- Terry Allen
- Danny Amendola
- Jason Andersen
- Bobby Anderson
- Calvin Anderson
- Darren Anderson
- Henry Anderson
- Mark Anderson
- Ralph Anderson
- David Andrews
- Jake Andrews
- Willie Andrews
- Joe Andruzzi
- Glenn Antrum
- Houston Antwine
- Bruce Armstrong
- Kyle Arrington
- Mike Arthur
- Julian Ashby
- Josh Ashton
- Tom Ashworth
- Devin Asiasi
- Jack Atchason
- Bill Atessis
- Ricky Atkinson
- Alex Austin
- Joe Avezzano
- Akeem Ayers
- Kole Ayi

== B ==
- Mike Baab
- Johnson Bademosi
- Matt Bahr
- Jake Bailey
- Teddy Bailey
- Bill Bain
- Chris Baker
- Javon Baker
- Melvin Baker
- Rashad Baker
- Rich Baldinger
- Corey Ballentine
- Mike Ballou
- Keshawn Banks
- Willie Banks
- Tully Banta-Cain
- Bryce Baringer
- Chris Barker
- Christian Barmore
- Brooks Barnard
- Kenjon Barner
- Bruce Barnes
- Pete Barnes
- Rodrigo Barnes
- Harlon Barnett
- Troy Barnett
- Josh Barrett
- Mike Bartrum
- Miles Battle
- Greg Baty
- Charlie Baumann
- De'Vante Bausby
- David Bavaro
- Fred Baxter
- Walter Beach
- Doug Beaudoin
- Steve Beauharnais
- Tom Beer
- Monty Beisel
- Bill Bell
- Jaheim Bell
- Joe Bellino
- Martellus Bennett
- Michael Bennett
- Phil Bennett
- Thomas Benson
- Ja'Whaun Bentley
- Jake Bequette
- Ron Berger
- Rashod Berry
- Justin Bethel
- Randy Beverly
- Frank Bianchini
- Terry Billups
- Joe Biscaha
- Michael Bishop
- Richard Bishop
- Eric Bjornson
- Mel Black
- Don Blackmon
- Joe Blahak
- Dick Blanchard
- Sid Blanks
- Drew Bledsoe
- Joshuah Bledsoe
- Bob Bleier
- LeGarrette Blount
- Chris Board
- Leigh Bodden
- Brandon Bolden
- Isaiah Bolden
- Ron Bolton
- Andy Borregales
- Jon Bostic
- Jim Boudreaux
- Kendrick Bourne
- Kayshon Boutte
- Lynn Bowden Jr.
- Tashawn Bower
- Jim Bowman
- Josh Boyce
- Greg Boyd (born 1950)
- Greg Boyd (born 1952)
- Ron Brace
- Garrett Bradbury
- Morris Bradshaw
- Kyle Brady
- Tom Brady
- John Bramlett
- Alan Branch
- Deion Branch
- O. J. Brigance
- Vincent Brisby
- Marlin Briscoe
- Jacoby Brissett
- Kenny Britt
- Wesley Britt
- Pete Brock
- Terrence Brooks
- Antonio Brown
- Barry Brown
- Ben Brown
- Bill Brown
- Chad Brown
- Corwin Brown
- Malcom Brown
- Monty Brown
- Pharaoh Brown
- Preston Brown
- Roger Brown
- Sergio Brown
- Sidney Brown
- Tarell Brown
- Trent Brown
- Troy Brown
- Vincent Brown
- Wilbert Brown
- Brandon Browner
- Dave Browning
- Fred Bruney
- Tedy Bruschi
- Hubie Bryant
- Marcus Bryant
- Myles Bryant
- Mark Buben
- Michael Buchanan
- Terrell Buckley
- Gary Bugenhagen
- Nick Buoniconti
- Derrick Burgess
- John Burke
- Rex Burkhead
- Steve Burks
- Ron Burton
- Adam Butler
- Darius Butler
- Malcolm Butler
- Marion Butts
- Keith Byars
- Damiere Byrd
- Dennis Byrd

== C ==
- Eddie Cade
- Travaris Cadet
- John Cagle
- Yodny Cajuste
- Reche Caldwell
- Don Calhoun
- Shilique Calhoun
- Chris Calloway
- Rich Camarillo
- Will Campbell
- Justin Canale
- Whit Canale
- Marcus Cannon
- Chris Canty
- Bob Cappadona
- Gino Cappelletti
- Joe Cardona
- Brian Carey
- Jeff Carlson
- Bobby Carpenter
- Rob Carpenter
- Allen Carter
- Andre Carter
- Chris Carter
- Kent Carter
- Tony Carter (born 1972)
- Tony Carter (born 1986)
- Jason Carthen
- Larry Carwell
- Rick Cash
- Jonathan Casillas
- Matt Cassel
- Al Catanho
- Matt Cavanaugh
- Larry Centers
- K'Lavon Chaisson
- Al Chandler
- Edgar Chandler
- Scott Chandler
- David Chapple
- John Charles
- Matt Chatham
- Je'Rod Cherry
- Jim Cheyunski
- Bam Childress
- Fred Childress
- Gene Chilton
- Efton Chism
- Dick Christy
- Eugene Chung
- Patrick Chung
- Ralph Cindrich
- Allan Clark
- Gail Clark
- Phil Clark
- Rico Clark
- Stevan Clark
- Willie Clay
- Adrian Clayborn
- Raymond Clayborn
- Stan Clayton
- Thomas Clayton
- Cam Cleeland
- Asante Cleveland
- Mike Cloud
- Dave Cloutier
- Ben Coates
- Cedric Cobbs
- Duffy Cobbs
- Wayne Coffey
- Abe Cohen
- Landon Cohen
- Jim Colclough
- Marquice Cole
- Dennis Coleman
- Eric Coleman
- Fred Coleman
- Justin Coleman
- Pat Coleman
- Austin Collie
- Jamie Collins
- Todd Collins
- Tony Collins
- Ferric Collons
- Harry Colon
- George Colton
- Rosevelt Colvin
- Mike Compton
- Tom Condon
- Dick Conn
- Dan Connolly
- Marv Cook
- Brandin Cooks
- Terrence Cooks
- Brandon Copeland
- Steve Corbett
- King Corcoran
- Rico Corsetti
- Ray Costict
- Lester Cotton
- Dana Cottrell
- Larry Cowan
- Byron Cowart
- Bryan Cox
- Shawn Crable
- Eric Crabtree
- Elbert Crawford
- Jim Crawford
- Vernon Crawford
- Smiley Creswell
- Ray Crittenden
- Corey Croom
- Bobby Cross
- Keion Crossen
- Cole Croston
- Jake Crouthamel
- Al Crow
- George Crump
- Harry Crump
- Alge Crumpler
- Bob Cryder
- Walt Cudzik
- Derrick Cullors
- Jay Cunningham
- Jermaine Cunningham
- Korey Cunningham
- Malik Cunningham
- Sam Cunningham
- Bill Currier
- Peter Cusick

== D ==
- Antico Dalton
- Maury Damkroger
- Bill Danenhauer
- Rohan Davey
- André Davis
- Carl Davis
- Carlton Davis
- Cody Davis
- Don Davis
- Elgin Davis
- Greg Davis
- Jack Davis
- Ja'Gared Davis
- Kanorris Davis
- Keionta Davis
- Sean Davis
- Shockmain Davis
- Bill Dawson
- Lin Dawson
- Brandon Deaderick
- Bob Dee
- Jeff Dellenbach
- Jerry DeLucca
- Alfonzo Dennard
- Damon Denson
- Steve DeOssie
- A. J. Derby
- Fred DeRiggi
- James Develin
- Jordan Devey
- Tyson DeVree
- Marcellas Dial
- Stefon Diggs
- Corey Dillon
- Tom Dimitroff, Sr.
- CJ Dippre
- Tony Discenzo
- Joshua Dobbs
- Aaron Dobson
- Steve Doig
- Paul Dombroski
- Kevin Donnalley
- Phillip Dorsett
- Nate Dorsey
- David Douglas
- Demario Douglas
- Brian Dowling
- Ras-I Dowling
- Doug Dressler
- Kyle Dugger
- Mike Dukes
- Bill DuLac
- Doug Dumler
- Reggie Dupard
- Yasir Durant
- Cory Durden
- Sandy Durko
- Tim Dwight
- Hart Lee Dykes

== E ==
- Dominique Easley
- Tony Eason
- Chad Eaton
- Nate Ebner
- Kyle Eckel
- A. J. Edds
- Julian Edelman
- Randy Edmunds
- Marc Edwards
- Robert Edwards
- Tim Edwards
- Patrick Egu
- Larry Eisenhauer
- Chris Eitzmann
- Daniel Ekuale
- Henry Ellard
- Ezekiel Elliott
- Ed Ellis
- Shaun Ellis
- Jerry Ellison
- Christian Elliss
- Jermaine Eluemunor
- Bert Emanuel
- Alex Erickson
- Heath Evans

== F ==
- Paul Fairchild
- Terry Falcon
- Joshua Farmer
- Lonnie Farmer
- Sean Farrell
- Kevin Faulk
- Christian Fauria
- Ricky Feacher
- Jeff Feagles
- Howard Feggins
- Paul Feldhausen
- Daniel Fells
- Dick Felt
- James Ferentz
- Vagas Ferguson
- Cameron Fleming
- Darius Fleming
- Bradley Fletcher
- Dane Fletcher
- Derrick Fletcher
- Tom Flick
- Marquis Flowers
- Trey Flowers
- Chris Floyd
- Michael Floyd
- Doug Flutie
- Nick Folk
- Kai Forbath
- Chuck Foreman
- Marcus Forston
- Ike Forte
- D. J. Foster
- Will Foster
- Tim Fox
- Todd Frain
- Justin Francis
- Russ Francis
- Arnold Franklin
- Tony Franklin
- Jim Fraser
- Charley Frazier
- Arturo Freeman
- Jonathan Freeny
- John Friesz
- David Frisch
- Hjalte Froholdt
- Irving Fryar
- Darrell Fullington
- Tom Funchess
- Thomas Fussell

== G ==
- Doug Gabriel
- Dennis Gadbois
- Jabar Gaffney
- Tony Gaiter
- Allen Gallaher
- Joey Galloway
- R.C. Gamble
- Chris Gambol
- Chris Gannon
- Teddy Garcia
- Ron Gardin
- Jimmy Garoppolo
- Carl Garrett
- J.D. Garrett
- Larry Garron
- Sam Gash
- Randall Gay
- Bob Geddes
- Tony George
- Willie Germany
- Mike Gesicki
- Jack Gibbens
- Antonio Gibson
- Ernest Gibson
- Joe Giles-Harris
- John Gillen
- Mike Gillislee
- Stephon Gilmore
- Paul Gipson
- Mike Gisler
- David Givens
- Bob Gladieux
- Terry Glenn
- Vencie Glenn
- Tim Goad
- Davon Godchaux
- Charlie Gogolak
- Tim Golden
- Bob Golic
- Christian Gonzalez
- Noe Gonzalez
- Josh Gordon
- Tim Gordon
- Brandon Gorin
- Stephen Gostkowski
- Neil Graff
- Art Graham
- Daniel Graham
- Hason Graham
- Milt Graham
- Shayne Graham
- Richie Grant
- Rupert Grant
- White Graves
- Jonas Gray
- Leon Gray
- David Green
- Jarvis Green
- Jerry Green
- Justin Green
- Victor Green
- Tom Greene
- Eric Gregory
- BenJarvus Green-Ellis
- Steve Gregory
- Marrio Grier
- Rich Griffith
- Nicholas Grigsby
- Reggie Grimes
- Geneo Grissom
- Steve Grogan
- Dan Gronkowski
- Rob Gronkowski
- Matt Gutierrez
- Lawrence Guy
- Gary Guyton
- Myron Guyton
- John Guzik

== H ==
- Halvor Hagen
- Mike Haggerty
- Darryl Haley
- Ron Hall
- Terez Hall
- Bobby Hamilton
- Ray Hamilton
- Woodrow Hamilton
- Kim Hammond
- Leonard Hankerson
- John Hannah
- Craig Hanneman
- Brian Hansen
- Bruce Hansen
- Chris Hanson
- Clay Harbor
- Eddie Hare
- Pat Harlow
- Duron Harmon
- Chris Harper
- Antwan Harris
- Damien Harris
- Darius Harris
- David Harris
- Kevin Harris
- Marshall Harris
- Raymont Harris
- Rickie Harris
- Ronnie Harris
- James Harrison
- Rodney Harrison
- N'Keal Harry
- Ken Hartley
- Richard Harvey
- Don Hasselbeck
- Jamycal Hasty
- Tim Hauck
- Art Hauser
- Artrell Hawkins
- Jaylinn Hawkins
- Mike Hawkins
- Steve Hawkins
- Greg Hawthorne
- Chris Hayes
- Donald Hayes
- Tae Hayes
- Mike Haynes
- Albert Haynesworth
- Jerome Henderson
- TreVeyon Henderson
- David Hendley
- Karl Henke
- Tom Hennessey
- Hunter Henry
- Luther Henson
- Al Herline
- Aaron Hernandez
- Ken Herock
- Justin Herron
- Mack Herron
- Akiem Hicks
- Dont'a Hightower
- Jeremy Hill
- Marquise Hill
- Trysten Hill
- Lex Hilliard
- Eddie Hinton
- Jimmy Hitchcock
- Ellis Hobbs
- Marion Hobby
- Russ Hochstein
- Milford Hodge
- Tommy Hodson
- George Hoey
- Chris Hogan
- Mack Hollins
- Jacob Hollister
- Brian Holloway
- Rob Holmberg
- Darryl Holmes
- Ernie Holmes
- Bernard Holsey
- Michael Hoomanawanui
- Austin Hooper
- Bob Howard
- David Howard
- Brian Hoyer
- Damon Huard
- John Huarte
- Mike Hubach
- Bill Hudson
- Ramon Humber
- Lil'Jordan Humphrey
- Jim Lee Hunt
- Kevin Hunt
- Sam Hunt
- Ivy Joe Hunter
- Maurice Hurst
- Brian Hutson
- Bob Hyland

== I ==
- James Ihedigbo
- Ray Ilg
- Martin Imhof
- Brian Ingram
- Jake Ingram
- Joey Iosefa
- Heath Irwin
- Sale Isaia
- Steve Israel
- Horace Ivory
- Chidi Iwuoma
- Larry Izzo
- Ryan Izzo

== J ==
- Chad Jackson
- Curtis Jackson
- Eddie Jackson
- Harold Jackson
- Honor Jackson
- J.C. Jackson
- Mike Jackson
- Steven Jackson
- Tre' Jackson
- Curtis Jacobs
- Demontrey Jacobs
- Harry Jacobs
- Ray Jacobs
- Harry Jagielski
- Brenden Jaimes
- Craig James
- D. J. James
- Roland James
- Tom Janik
- Ilia Jarostchuk
- Ray Jarvis
- Ricky Jean-Francois
- Shawn Jefferson
- Dietrich Jells
- Ed Jenkins
- Anfernee Jennings
- Terrell Jennings
- Gary Jeter
- Andy Johnson
- Anthony Johnson
- Bethel Johnson
- Billy Johnson
- Chad Johnson
- Charles Johnson
- D'Ernest Johnson
- Damaris Johnson
- Damian Johnson
- Daryl Johnson
- Ellis Johnson
- Eric Johnson
- Garrett Johnson
- Jakob Johnson
- Joe Johnson
- Lee Johnson
- Leonard Johnson
- Mario Johnson
- Olrick Johnson
- Preston Johnson
- Rufus Johnson
- Steve Johnson
- Ted Johnson
- Aaron Jones
- Cedric Jones
- Chandler Jones
- Chris Jones
- Cyrus Jones
- Don Jones
- Ezell Jones
- Jack Jones
- Jonathan Jones
- Kenyatta Jones
- Mac Jones
- Marcus Jones (cornerback)
- Mike Jones
- Nate Jones
- Tebucky Jones
- Todd Jones
- Truman Jones
- LaMont Jordan
- Michael Jordan
- Shelby Jordan
- Tim Jordan
- Matthew Judon

== K ==
- Nick Kaczur
- Ron Kadziel
- Ufomba Kamalu
- Joe Kapp
- Ted Karras
- Kevin Kasper
- Matt Katula
- Andy Katzenmoyer
- Dan Kecman
- Dalton Keene
- Durwood Keeton
- Ethan Kelley
- Ben Kelly
- Tommy Kelly
- Mike Kerrigan
- David Key
- Ed Khayat
- Kelvin Kight
- Bill Kimber
- Brian Kinchen
- Steve Kiner
- Brandon King
- Claude King
- Steve King
- Ishmaa'ily Kitchen
- Dan Klecko
- Dick Klein
- Adrian Klemm
- Josh Kline
- Gayle Knief
- Ed Koontz
- Jeff Kopp
- Dan Koppen
- Niko Koutouvides
- Merv Krakau
- Bob Kratch
- Bob Kuberski
- Art Kuehn
- Justin Kurpeikis

== L ==
- Matt LaCosse
- Anthony Ladd
- Brandon LaFell
- Dion Lambert
- Harold Landry
- Max Lane
- Antonio Langham
- Harvey Langi
- Bill Larson
- Ike Lassiter
- Ty Law
- Jamie Lawson
- Odell Lawson
- Michael LeBlanc
- Bob Lee
- Eric Lee
- John Lee
- Keith Lee
- Kevin Lee
- Burnie Legette
- Matt Lengel
- Bill Lenkaitis
- Bobby Leo
- Chuck Leo
- Titus Leo
- Louis Leonard
- Nick Leverett
- Mark LeVoir
- Bill Lewis
- Dion Lewis
- Vernon Lewis
- Matt Light
- Paul Lindquist
- Larry Linne
- Ronnie Lippett
- Walt Livingston
- Brandon Lloyd
- Bret Lockett
- Eugene Lockhart
- Scott Lockwood
- Oscar Lofton
- Steve Lofton
- Charlie Long
- Chris Long
- Mike Long
- Billy Lott
- Rommie Loudd
- Angelo Loukas
- Kyle Love
- Omare Lowe
- Vederian Lowe
- Nick Lowery
- Orlando Lowry
- Ray Lucas
- Mel Lunsford
- Rick Lyle

== M ==
- Isaiah Mack
- Atonio Mafi
- Jack Maitland
- Wesly Mallard
- Ryan Mallett
- Irvin Mallory
- Cassh Maluia
- Steve Maneri
- Dino Mangiero
- John Mangum
- Logan Mankins
- Marte Mapu
- Fred Marion
- Laurence Maroney
- Aaron Marsh
- Cassius Marsh
- Al Marshall
- Curtis Martin
- Derrick Martin
- Don Martin
- Eric Martin
- Keshawn Martin
- Marcus Martin
- Sammy Martin
- Steve Martin
- Dave Mason
- Shaq Mason
- Wayne Mass
- Jim Massey
- Ochaun Mathis
- Trevor Matich
- Bill Matthews
- Henry Matthews
- Michael Matthews
- Art May
- Drake Maye
- Shawn Mayer
- Jerod Mayo
- Corey Mays
- James McAlister
- Jerry McCabe
- Bob McCall
- Riley McCarron
- Shawn McCarthy
- Terrell McClain
- Albert McClellan
- Shea McClellin
- Don McComb
- Devin McCourty
- Jason McCourty
- Fred McCrary
- Prentice McCray
- Dave McCurry
- Conor McDermott
- Sean McDermott
- Dewey McDonald
- Nick McDonald
- Doug McDougald
- George McGee
- Tony McGee
- Willie McGinest
- Rob McGovern
- Brandon McGowan
- Larry McGrew
- Mike McGruder
- Joe McHale
- Bob McKay
- Don McKinnon
- Art McMahon
- Steve McMichael
- Raekwon McMillan
- Greg McMurtry
- Emanuel McNeil
- Leon McQuay
- Chuck McSwain
- Rod McSwain
- Dave Meggett
- Marc Megna
- Ed Meixler
- Jon Melander
- Obi Melifonwu
- Rashaan Melvin
- Brandon Meriweather
- Zoltán Meskó
- Jakobi Meyers
- Sony Michel
- Ray Mickens
- Jack Mildren
- Hugh Millen
- Alan Miller
- Dan Miller
- Josh Miller
- Lawyer Milloy
- Jalen Mills
- Joe Milton
- Barkevious Mingo
- Kobee Minor
- Rex Mirich
- Brandon Mitchell
- DaMarcus Mitchell
- Leroy Mitchell
- Malcolm Mitchell
- Mel Mitchell
- Antwaun Molden
- Donte Moncrief
- Ty Montgomery
- Mike Montler
- Arthur Moore
- Brandon Moore
- Eric Moore
- Greg Moore
- Leroy Moore
- Marty Moore
- Rashad Moore
- Sterling Moore
- Steve Moore
- Will Moore
- Zach Moore
- Earthwind Moreland
- Sean Morey
- Stanley Morgan
- Aric Morris
- Jamie Morris
- Jon Morris
- Mike Morris
- Sammy Morris
- Guy Morriss
- Quandre Mosely
- Morgan Moses
- Randy Moss
- Roland Moss
- Zefross Moss
- Zeke Mowatt
- Gene Mruczkowski
- Matthew Mulligan
- Chad Muma
- Thayer Munford
- Calvin Munson
- Bill Murphy
- Caleb Murphy
- Bill Murray
- Marques Murrell
- Leonard Myers

== N ==
- Jim Nance
- Eric Naposki
- Stephen Neal
- Andre Neblett
- Billy Neighbors
- Edmund Nelson
- Steve Nelson
- Tom Neumann
- Tom Neville
- Marshall Newhouse
- Cam Newton
- Yannick Ngakoue
- Bobby Nichols
- Rob Ninkovich
- David Nugent
- Mike Nugent

== O ==
- Don Oakes
- Ryan O'Callaghan
- Kevin O'Connell
- Ross O'Hanley
- Rich Ohrnberger
- Quinn Ojinnaka
- Chukwuma Okorafor
- Gunner Olszewski
- Deltha O'Neal
- Pat O'Neill
- Michael Onwenu
- K.J. Osborn
- Willie Osley
- John Outlaw
- Don Overton
- Tom Owen
- Dennis Owens

== P ==
- Jarrad Page
- Michael Palardy
- Babe Parilli
- DeVante Parker
- Riddick Parker
- Patrick Pass
- Mike Patrick
- David Patten
- Cordarrelle Patterson
- Jerry Patton
- Jeff Paulk
- Lonie Paxton
- Carlos Pennywell
- George Peoples
- Jabrill Peppers
- Willis Perkins
- Bob Perryman
- Joe Peterson
- Mitch Petrus
- Dell Pettus
- Jeremiah Pharms
- Leroy Phelps
- Roman Phifer
- Adrian Phillips
- Jess Phillips
- Ed Philpott
- Clay Pickering
- Mike Pitts
- Anthony Pleasant
- Art Plunkett
- Jim Plunkett
- Lousaka Polite
- Ja'Lynn Polk
- Elijah Ponder
- David Pool
- Tyrone Poole
- Ken Pope
- Tom Porell
- Willie Porter
- David Posey
- Hank Poteat
- Andre President
- Luke Prestridge
- Kenny Price
- Taylor Price
- Gene Profit
- Perry Pruett
- Myron Pryor
- Garry Puetz
- Lovett Purnell
- Vic Purvis
- George Pyne III

== R ==
- Bill Rademacher
- Gregg Rakoczy
- Derrick Ramsey
- Tom Ramsey
- Greg Randall
- Ray Ratkowski
- Eddie Ray
- Terry Ray
- Jalen Reagor
- Vince Redd
- Reggie Redding
- J.R. Redmond
- Ben Reed
- Bernard Reedy
- Scott Rehberg
- Tom Rehder
- Dexter Reid
- Riley Reiff
- Kevin Reilly
- Trevor Reilly
- Johnny Rembert
- Darrelle Revis
- Bob Reynolds
- Ed Reynolds
- Ricky Reynolds
- Tom Reynolds
- Leonta Rheams
- Monty Rice
- Rodney Rice
- David Richards
- Jordan Richards
- Al Richardson
- Jess Richardson
- Mike Richardson
- Tom Richardson
- Stevan Ridley
- Mike Rivera
- Derek Rivers
- Marcellus Rivers
- Randy Robbins
- Elandon Roberts
- Sam Roberts
- Tim Roberts
- William Roberts
- Bo Robinson
- Greg Robinson
- Junior Robinson
- Layden Robinson
- Mark Robinson
- Rex Robinson
- Tyrese Robinson
- Frank Robotti
- Doug Rogers
- Jim Romaniszyn
- Tony Romeo
- Al Romine
- D'Angelo Ross
- Dave Rowe
- Eric Rowe
- Jaquelin Roy
- Todd Rucci
- Reggie Rucker
- Jack Rudolph
- Grey Ruegamer
- Bernard Russ
- Leonard Russell
- Mike Ruth
- Rod Rutledge
- Logan Ryan
- Chad Ryland

== S ==
- Dwayne Sabb
- Frank Sacco
- Pio Sagapolutele
- Greg Salas
- P. K. Sam
- Asante Samuel
- Deac Sanders
- James Sanders
- Lewis Sanders
- Todd Sandham
- Terdell Sands
- Rick Sanford
- Mohamed Sanu
- Tony Sardisco
- Doug Satcher
- Todd Sauerbrun
- Jon Sawyer
- Mike Saxon
- Jace Sayler
- Bob Scarpitto
- Greg Schaum
- Bob Schmidt
- Bruce Scholtz
- Brenden Schooler
- Marty Schottenheimer
- Eric Schubert
- Steve Schubert
- Gerhard Schwedes
- Brian Schwenke
- Chad Scott
- Clarence Scott
- Guss Scott
- Trevor Scott
- Walter Scott
- Willie Scott
- Randy Sealby
- Junior Seau
- Scott Secules
- Ron Sellers
- Kato Serwanga
- Richard Seymour
- Harold Shaw
- Sedrick Shaw
- Terrance Shaw
- Jabaal Sheard
- Ron Shegog
- Danny Shelton
- Tom Sherman
- William Sherman
- Visanthe Shiancoe
- Dick Shiner
- Rod Shoate
- Chuck Shonta
- Peter Shorts
- Eric Sievers
- Sealver Siliga
- Alex Silvestro
- John Simerson
- Kendall Simmons
- Tony Simmons
- John Simon
- Kenneth Sims
- Karl Singer
- Chris Singleton
- Scott Sisson
- Doug Skene
- Deontae Skinner
- Chris Slade
- Matthew Slater
- Joey Slye
- Torrance Small
- Fred Smerlas
- Antowain Smith
- Donnell Smith
- Hal Smith
- John Smith
- Jonathan Smith
- Jonnu Smith
- Lecitus Smith
- Le Kevin Smith
- Otis Smith
- Ricky Smith
- Rod Smith
- Sean Smith
- JuJu Smith-Schuster
- Al Snyder
- Matt Sokol
- Nate Solder
- Bob Soltis
- Butch Songin
- Isaac Sopoaga
- Sidy Sow
- Stephen Spach
- Antwain Spann
- Ron Spears
- Ameer Speed
- Akeem Spence
- Brandon Spikes
- Robert Spillane
- Greg Spires
- Shawn Springs
- Len St. Jean
- Donté Stallworth
- Isaiah Stanback
- Sylvester Stanley
- Walter Stanley
- Duane Starks
- Stephen Starring
- Jason Staurovsky
- Fred Steinfort
- Brian Stenger
- Calvin Stephens
- John Stephens
- Thomas Stephens
- Matt Stevens
- Rhamondre Stevenson
- Jarrett Stidham
- Darryl Stingley
- Eric Stokes
- J. J. Stokes
- Michael Stone
- Bryan Stork
- Cole Strange
- Bill Striegel
- Pierre Strong
- Shawn Stuckey
- Pat Studstill
- Fred Sturt
- Bob Suci
- Zach Sudfeld
- Chris Sullivan
- Will Svitek
- Terry Swanson
- Joe Sweet
- Bradyn Swinson
- Alfred Sykes

== T ==
- Sione Takitaki
- Mike Taliaferro
- Aqib Talib
- John Tanner
- Richard Tardits
- Jeff Tarpinian
- John Tarver
- Brandon Tate
- Mosi Tatupu
- Jahlani Tavai
- Fred Taylor
- Gene Taylor
- Greg Taylor
- J. J. Taylor
- Kitrick Taylor
- Leonard Taylor III
- Vinny Testaverde
- Adalius Thomas
- Ben Thomas
- Blair Thomas
- David Thomas
- Donald Thomas
- Donnie Thomas
- Gene Thomas
- Henry Thomas
- Jordan Thomas
- Santonio Thomas
- Zachary Thomas
- Kenbrell Thompkins
- Leroy Thompson
- Reyna Thompson
- Tyquan Thornton
- Joe Thuney
- Nick Thurman
- Michael Timpson
- Andre Tippett
- David Tipton
- Ken Toler
- Eric Tomlinson
- Ed Toner
- Khyiris Tonga
- Bobby Towns
- Keith Traylor
- Don Trull
- Erroll Tucker
- Ross Tucker
- Maugaula Tuitele
- Tom Tupa
- Bake Turner
- Bill Turner
- Kevin Turner
- T. J. Turner
- Darren Twombly
- Brian Tyms

== U ==
- Josh Uche
- Tiquan Underwood

== V ==
- Vincent Valentine
- Mark van Eeghen
- Kyle Van Noy
- Randy Vataha
- Jon Vaughn
- Joe Vellano
- Raymond Ventrone
- Ross Ventrone
- Shane Vereen
- Garin Veris
- David Viaene
- Danny Villa
- Adam Vinatieri
- Scott Virkus
- Tristan Vizcaino
- Sebastian Vollmer
- Mike Vrabel

== W ==
- LaAdrian Waddle
- Shaun Wade
- Bryan Wagner
- Bruce Walker
- Casey Walker
- Mike Walker
- Caedan Wallace
- Ken Walter
- David Ward
- Dedric Ward
- Gerard Warren
- Lamont Warren
- Ty Warren
- Clyde Washington
- John Washington
- Kelley Washington
- Leon Washington
- Mark Washington
- Mickey Washington
- Scotty Washington
- Ted Washington
- Brian Waters
- Ben Watson
- Dave Watson
- Dekoda Watson
- Clarence Weathers
- Robert Weathers
- Jed Weaver
- Don Webb
- Raleigh Webb
- George Webster
- Jason Webster
- Ed Weisacosky
- Clayton Weishuhn
- Claxton Welch
- Thomas Welch
- Wes Welker
- Billy Wells
- Ryan Wendell
- Mel West
- Don Westbrook
- Jack Westover
- Jim Whalen
- Terrence Wheatley
- Tyrone Wheatley Jr.
- Dwight Wheeler
- Mark Wheeler
- Larry Whigham
- Adrian White
- Chris White
- David White
- Harvey White
- James White
- Jeff White
- Jim White
- Keion White
- Reggie White
- Tracy White
- Todd Whitten
- Fred Whittingham
- Murray Wichard
- Jermaine Wiggins
- Steve Wilburn
- Mitchell Wilcox
- Vince Wilfork
- Jonathan Wilhite
- Kristian Wilkerson
- Brent Williams
- Brian Williams
- Brooks Williams
- Derwin Williams
- D. J. Williams
- Ed Williams
- Grant Williams
- Joejuan Williams
- Jon Williams
- Kyle Williams
- Larry Williams
- Lester Williams
- Malcolm Williams
- Michael Williams
- Milton Williams
- Perry Williams
- Toby Williams
- Xavier Williams
- J. R. Williamson
- Darrell Wilson
- Darryal Wilson
- David Wilson
- Eddie Wilson
- Eugene Wilson
- Jared Wilson
- Jerrel Wilson
- Joe Wilson
- Mack Wilson
- Marc Wilson
- Marco Wilson
- Tavon Wilson
- Bob Windsor
- Chase Winovich
- Kellen Winslow II
- Dennis Wirgowski
- Deatrich Wise Jr.
- Mel Witt
- Dave Wohlabaugh
- George Wonsley
- Danny Woodhead
- Carl Woods
- Charles Woods
- Pierre Woods
- Craig Woodson
- Damien Woody
- Ron Wooten
- Darryl Wren
- Elmo Wright
- Mike Wright
- Tim Wright
- Devin Wyman
- Isaiah Wynn

== X ==
- Oshane Ximines

== Y ==
- Carlos Yancy
- Billy Yates
- Bob Yates
- Tom Yewcic

== Z ==
- Steve Zabel
- Tony Zackery
- John Zamberlin
- Bailey Zappe
- Joaquin Zendejas
- Amos Zereoué
- Scott Zolak
- Isaiah Zuber
