= 1987 New England Patriots season =

Season of National Football League team the New England Patriots

- Owner: Billy Sullivan
- General manager: Patrick Sullivan
- Head coach: Raymond Berry
- Home stadium: Sullivan Stadium

Results
- Record: 8–7
- Division place: T-2nd AFC East
- Playoffs: Did not qualify
- All-Pros: LB Andre Tippett (1st team)
- Pro Bowlers: WR Stanley Morgan; LB Andre Tippett

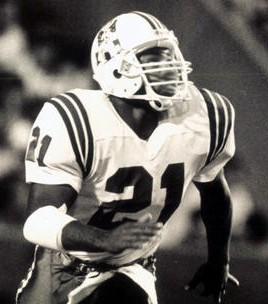
Running back Reggie Dupard playing for the Patriots, circa 1987.

The 1987 New England Patriots season was the franchise's 18th season in the National Football League and 28th overall. They failed to improve on their 11–5 record from 1986, in the strike-shortened season, finishing 8–7, tied for second in the AFC East Division, and missing the playoffs for the first time since 1984.

Despite a players' strike, a revolving door at quarterback, and uncertainty over the team's ownership, the team managed to commit only 63 penalties in 1987, fewer than half of the 135 penalties that the Packer and Jet squads each committed.

== Offseason ==
=== NFL draft ===
1987 New England Patriots draft
Round	Pick	Player	Position	College	Notes
1	23	Bruce Armstrong *	T	Louisville	
3	79	Bob Perryman	FB	Michigan	
4	98	Rich Gannon *	QB	Delaware	
4	102	Derrick Beasley	DB	Winston-Salem State	
4	107	Tim Jordan	LB	Wisconsin	
5	113	Danny Villa	T	Arizona State	
5	116	Tom Gibson	DE	Northern Arizona	
6	163	Gene Taylor	WR	Fresno State	
11	302	Carlos Reveiz	K	Tennessee	
11	330	Elgin Davis	RB	UCF	
Made roster † Pro Football Hall of Fame * Made at least one Pro Bowl during career

== Personnel ==
=== Staff ===
New England Patriots 1987 staff
Front office: President – Billy Sullivan; Executive vice president – Chuck Sullivan; Vice-president – Bucko Kilroy; General manager – Patrick Sullivan; Director of player development – Dick Steinberg; Director of college scouting – Joe Mendes; Director of pro scouting – Bill McPeak; Special assistant to the head coach – John Polonchek; Head coaches: Head coach – Raymond Berry; Assistant head coach/offensive coordinator – Rod Humenuik; Offensive coaches: Quarterbacks/passing game coordinator – Les Steckel; Offensive backfield/running game coordinator – Bobby Grier; Receivers – Harold Jackson	Defensive coaches: Defensive coordinator – Rod Rust; Defensive line – Eddie Khayat; Assistant defensive line – Ray Hamilton; Linebackers – Don Shinnick; Defensive backfield – Jim Carr; Special teams coaches: Special teams/tight ends – Dante Scarnecchia; Strength and conditioning: Strength and conditioning – Dean Brittenham

=== NFL replacement players ===
After the league decided to use replacement players during the NFLPA strike, the following team was assembled:

1987 New England Patriots replacement roster
Quarterbacks: 10 Bob Bleier; 15 Todd Whitten; Running backs: 21 Ted Stoneburner; 24 Bruce Hanson; 27 Michael LeBlanc; 30 Frank Bianchini; 32 Chuck McSwain; 33 Tony Collins; 34 Carl Woods; Wide receivers: 80 Larry Linne; 81 Brian Carey; 82 Dennis Gadbois; 83 Wayne Coffey; 86 Mike Benson; 88 Bill LaFreniere; Tight ends: 44 Todd Frain; 87 Arnold Franklin; 85 Mike Siragusa	Offensive linemen: 67 John Benzinger; 63 George Colton; 61 Greg Robinson; 75 Mark Roddy; 62 Todd Sandham; 70 Brian Saranovitz; 78 Eric Stokes; 74 Bill Turner; 64 Darren Twombly; 66 Craig Vittum; Defensive linemen: 97 John Guzik; 96 Steve O'Malley; 71 Ben Reed; 65 Tom Porell; 60 Frank Romano; 99 Steve Wilburn; 90 Murray Wchard	Linebackers: 91 Rogers Alexander; 93 Rico Corsetti; 51 Mel Black; 52 Jerry McCabe; 55 Joe McHale; 54 Greg Moore; 50 Tony Reider; 95 Frank Sacco; 59 Randy Sealby; Defensive backs: 22 Ricky Atkinson; 43 Duffy Cobbs; 23 Maurice Gravely; 41 Joe Peterson; 31 Jon Sawyer; 42 Ron Shegog; 38 Perry Williams; Special teams: 6 Al Herline K/P; 1 Eric Schubert

=== Roster ===
1987 New England Patriots roster
Quarterbacks (QB): 2 Doug Flutie; 14 Steve Grogan; 12 Tom Ramsey; Running backs (RB): 33 Tony Collins; 40 Elgin Davis; 21 Reggie Dupard; 34 Bob Perryman; 30 Mosi Tatupu; Wide receivers (WR): 80 Irving Fryar; 48 Dennis Gadbois; 83 Cedric Jones; 86 Stanley Morgan; 81 Stephen Starring; 82 Derwin Williams; Tight ends (TE): 87 Lin Dawson; 49 Russ Francis; 88 Willie Scott	Offensive linemen (OL): 78 Bruce Armstrong T; 58 Pete Brock C; 63 George Colton T; 66 Paul Fairchild G/C; 62 Sean Farrell G; 64 Trevor Matich C; 70 Art Plunkett T; 73 Danny Villa T; 61 Ron Wooten G; Defensive linemen (DL): 85 Julius Adams DE; 97 Milford Hodge DE; 65 Mike Ruth NT; 77 Kenneth Sims DE; 60 Garin Veris DE; 96 Brent Williams DE; 90 Toby Williams NT	Linebackers (LB): 93 Tim Jordan OLB; 50 Larry McGrew ILB; 57 Steve Nelson ILB; 52 Johnny Rembert ILB; 95 Ed Reynolds ILB; 56 Andre Tippett OLB; 54 Ed Williams OLB; Defensive backs (DB): 28 Jim Bowman SS; 43 Ernest Gibson CB; 41 Darryl Holmes FS; 38 Roland James SS; 42 Ronnie Lippett CB; 31 Fred Marion FS; 23 Rod McSwain CB; 22 Gene Profit CB; Special teams (ST): 3 Rich Camarillo P; 1 Tony Franklin K	Reserve: 25 Derrick Beasley S (IR); 55 Don Blackmon LB (IR); 26 Raymond Clayborn CB (IR); 11 Tony Eason QB (IR); 99 Tom Gibson DE (IR); 24 Bruce Hansen RB (IR); 32 Craig James RB (IR); 9 Walter Lewis QB (IR); -- Larry Linne WR (IR); -- Jerry McCabe LB (IR); 67 Steve Moore T (IR); 75 Guy Morriss C (IR); 59 Randy Sealby LB (IR); -- Robert Weathers RB (PUP); Rookies in italics

== Regular season ==
=== Schedule ===
Week	Date	Opponent	Result	Record	Venue	Attendance
1	September 13	**Miami Dolphins**	**W** 28–21	1–0	Sullivan Stadium	54,642
2	September 21	at **New York Jets**	**L** 24–43	1–1	Giants Stadium	70,847
–	September 27	at Washington Redskins	canceled	1–1	RFK Stadium	
3	October 4	Cleveland Browns	**L** 10–20	1–2	Sullivan Stadium	14,830
4	October 11	**Buffalo Bills**	**W** 14–7	2–2	Sullivan Stadium	11,878
5	October 18	at Houston Oilers	**W** 21–7	3–2	Astrodome	26,294
6	October 25	at **Indianapolis Colts**	**L** 16–30	3–3	Hoosier Dome	48,850
7	November 1	Los Angeles Raiders	**W** 26–23	4–3	Sullivan Stadium	60,664
8	November 8	at New York Giants	**L** 10–17	4–4	Giants Stadium	73,817
9	November 15	Dallas Cowboys	**L** 17–23	4–5	Sullivan Stadium	60,567
10	November 22	**Indianapolis Colts**	**W** 24–0	5–5	Sullivan Stadium	56,906
11	November 29	Philadelphia Eagles	**L** 31–34	5–6	Sullivan Stadium	54,198
12	December 6	at Denver Broncos	**L** 20–31	5–7	Mile High Stadium	75,795
13	December 13	**New York Jets**	**W** 42–20	6–7	Sullivan Stadium	60,617
14	December 20	at **Buffalo Bills**	**W** 13–7	7–7	Rich Stadium	74,945
15	December 28	at **Miami Dolphins**	**W** 24–10	8–7	Joe Robbie Stadium	61,192
Note: Intra-division opponents are in **bold** text.

== Season summary ==
=== Week 1 ===
Team	1	2	3	4	Total
Dolphins	7	14	0	0	21
• Patriots	7	7	14	0	28

- Date: September 13, 1987
- Location: Schaefer Stadium
- Game start: 1:00 p.m. EST
- Game attendance: 54,642
- Game weather: 61 °F (16.1 °C); wind 10 miles per hour (16 km/h; 8.7 kn), rainy
- Referee: Tom Dooley
- TV announcers (NBC): Don Criqui and Bob Trumpy

Miami Dolphins punter Reggie Roby injured in the game, forcing Don Strock to punt in the emergency situation. Additionally, with 2:22 left in the game Dan Marino was injured forcing Strock to fill in at the quarterback position as well, nearly mounting a winning comeback drive.

=== Standings ===
AFC East
	W	L	T	PCT	DIV	CONF	PF	PA	STK
^{(3)} Indianapolis Colts	9	6	0	.600	5–3	8–6	300	238	W2
New England Patriots	8	7	0	.533	6–2	8–4	320	293	W3
Miami Dolphins	8	7	0	.533	2–6	5–7	362	335	L1
Buffalo Bills	7	8	0	.467	4–4	6–6	270	305	L2
New York Jets	6	9	0	.400	3–5	6–5	334	360	L4

== See also ==
- List of New England Patriots seasons
