= 1988 New England Patriots season =

Season of National Football League team the New England Patriots

- Owner: Victor Kiam
- General manager: Patrick Sullivan
- Head coach: Raymond Berry
- Home stadium: Sullivan Stadium

Results
- Record: 9–7
- Division place: T-2nd AFC East
- Playoffs: Did not qualify
- All-Pros: T Bruce Armstrong (2nd team); LB Andre Tippett (2nd team)
- Pro Bowlers: RB John Stephens; LB Johnny Rembert; LB Andre Tippett

Uniform

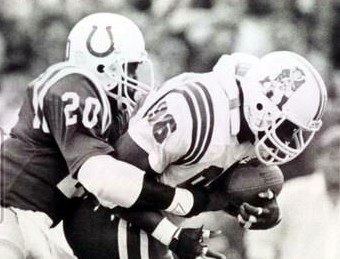
The Patriots playing against the Indianapolis Colts, circa 1988.

The 1988 New England Patriots season was the franchise's 19th season in the National Football League, the 29th overall and the 5th under head coach Raymond Berry. With a record of nine wins and seven losses, they finished tied for second in the AFC East Division. It would take until 1994 for the Patriots to record another winning season. The Patriots improved on its 8–7 record from 1987, winning one more game due to one game being cancelled the previous season. Despite the winning record, the Patriots did not reach the postseason. They finished tied for 2nd in the AFC East with the arch rival Colts, but were relegated to 3rd place because the Colts had a better record against common opponents than the Patriots did.

The last remaining active member of the 1988 New England Patriots was Jeff Feagles, who retired after the 2009 season.

== Offseason ==
=== NFL draft ===
1988 New England Patriots draft
Round	Pick	Player	Position	College	Notes
1	17	John Stephens *	Running back	Northwestern State	
2	43	Vincent Brown	Linebacker	Mississippi Valley State	
3	69	Tom Rehder	Tackle	Notre Dame	
4	87	Tim Goad	Nose tackle	North Carolina	
4	97	Sammy Martin	Wide receiver	LSU	
4	100	Teddy Garcia	Kicker	Northeast Louisiana	
5	115	Troy Wolko	Guard	Minnesota	
6	154	Steve Johnson	Tight end	Virginia Tech	
7	181	Darryl Usher	Wide receiver	Illinois	
9	240	Neil Galbraith	Defensive back	Central State (OK)	
10	267	Rodney Lossow	Center	Wisconsin	
11	294	Marvin Allen	Running back	Tulane	
12	321	Dave Nugent	Defensive tackle	Boston College	
Made roster * Made at least one Pro Bowl during career

=== Undrafted free agents ===
1988 undrafted free agents of note
Player	Position	College
Lee Hull	Wide receiver	Holy Cross

== Personnel ==
=== Staff ===
1988 New England Patriots staff
Front office: Chairman – Victor Kiam; Vice Chairman – Fran Murray; President – Billy Sullivan; Vice President – Bucko Kilroy; General Manager – Patrick Sullivan; Director of Player Development – Dick Steinberg; Director of Pro Scouting – Bill McPeak; Director of College Scouting – Joe Mendes; Special Assistant to Head Coach – John Polonchek; Head coaches: Head Coach – Raymond Berry; Assistant Head Coach/Offensive Coordinator – Rod Humenuik; Offensive coaches: Quarterbacks/Passing Game Coordinator – Les Steckel; Offensive Backfield/Running Game Coordinator – Bobby Grier; Receivers – Harold Jackson; Offensive line – Guy Morriss	Defensive coaches: Defensive Line – Eddie Khayat; Assistant Defensive Line – Ray Hamilton; Linebackers – Don Shinnick; Defensive Backfield – Jim Carr; Staff Assistant – Don Blackmon; Special teams coaches: Special Teams/Tigh Ends – Dante Scarnecchia; Strength and conditioning: Strength and Conditioning – Jerry Simmons

=== Roster ===
1988 New England Patriots roster
Quarterbacks (QB): 11 Tony Eason; 2 Doug Flutie; 14 Steve Grogan; Running backs (RB): 40 Elgin Davis; 21 Reggie Dupard; 34 Bob Perryman FB; 44 John Stephens; 30 Mosi Tatupu; Wide receivers (WR): 80 Irving Fryar PR; 48 Dennis Gadbois; 83 Cedric Jones; 82 Sammy Martin KR; 86 Stanley Morgan; Tight ends (TE): 81 Russ Francis; 85 Steve Johnson	Offensive linemen (OL): 78 Bruce Armstrong T; 68 Mike Baab C; 66 Paul Fairchild G; 62 Sean Farrell G; 64 Trevor Matich; 76 Tom Rehder T; 73 Danny Villa; 61 Ron Wooten G; Defensive linemen (DL): 72 Tim Goad NT; 97 Milford Hodge; 65 Edmund Nelson; 60 Garin Veris DE; 96 Brent Williams DE; 90 Toby Williams DE	Linebackers (LB): 53 Thomas Benson ILB; 59 Vincent Brown ILB; 93 Tim Jordan OLB; 50 Larry McGrew OLB; 52 Johnny Rembert ILB; 95 Ed Reynolds ILB; 56 Andre Tippett OLB; Defensive backs (DB): 28 Jim Bowman SS; 26 Raymond Clayborn CB; 27 Howard Feggins CB; 43 Ernest Gibson CB; 41 Darryl Holmes FS; 38 Roland James SS; 42 Ronnie Lippett CB; 31 Fred Marion FS; 23 Rod McSwain CB; Special teams (ST): 6 Jeff Feagles P; 7 Teddy Garcia K; 4 Jason Staurovsky K	Reserve: 39 Marvin Allen (IR); 87 Lin Dawson TE (IR); 99 Tom Gibson DE (IR); 32 Craig James RB (IR); -- Kennard McGuire WR (IR); -- Gerrick McPhearson CB (IR); 67 Steve Moore T (NF-Ill.); 91 Eric Naposki LB (IR); 88 Willie Scott TE (IR); 77 Kenneth Sims DE (IR); 18 Darryl Usher WR (IR); 94 David Ward LB (IR); -- Kevin White WR (IR); 54 Ed Williams LB (IR); 63 Troy Wolkow G (IR); 47 active, 15 inactive Rookies in italics

== Regular season ==
=== Schedule ===
Week	Date	Opponent	Result	Record	Venue	Attendance	Recap
1	September 4	**New York Jets**	**W** 28–3	1–0	Sullivan Stadium	44,027	Recap
2	September 11	at Minnesota Vikings	**L** 6–36	1–1	Hubert H. Humphrey Metrodome	55,545	Recap
3	September 18	**Buffalo Bills**	**L** 14–16	1–2	Sullivan Stadium	55,945	Recap
4	September 25	at Houston Oilers	**L** 6–31	1–3	Houston Astrodome	38,646	Recap
5	October 2	**Indianapolis Colts**	**W** 21–17	2–3	Sullivan Stadium	58,050	Recap
6	October 9	at Green Bay Packers	**L** 3–45	2–4	Milwaukee County Stadium	51,932	Recap
7	October 16	Cincinnati Bengals	**W** 27–21	3–4	Sullivan Stadium	59,969	Recap
8	October 23	at **Buffalo Bills**	**L** 20–23	3–5	Rich Stadium	76,824	Recap
9	October 30	Chicago Bears	**W** 30–7	4–5	Sullivan Stadium	60,821	Recap
10	November 6	**Miami Dolphins**	**W** 21–10	5–5	Sullivan Stadium	60,840	Recap
11	November 13	at **New York Jets**	**W** 14–13	6–5	Giants Stadium	48,358	Recap
12	November 20	at **Miami Dolphins**	**W** 6–3	7–5	Joe Robbie Stadium	53,526	Recap
13	November 27	at **Indianapolis Colts**	**L** 21–24	7–6	Hoosier Dome	58,157	Recap
14	December 4	Seattle Seahawks	**W** 13–7	8–6	Sullivan Stadium	59,086	Recap
15	December 11	Tampa Bay Buccaneers	**W** 10–7 (OT)	9–6	Sullivan Stadium	39,889	Recap
16	December 17	at Denver Broncos	**L** 10–21	9–7	Mile High Stadium	70,910	Recap
Note: Intra-division opponents are in **bold** text.

=== Game summaries ===
==== Week 5 ====
Team	1	2	3	4	Total
Colts	0	7	0	10	17
• Patriots	0	7	0	14	21

- Date: October 2
- Location: Sullivan Stadium, Foxboro, Massachusetts
- Game start: 1:00 p.m.
- Game weather: 68 °F (20 °C); wind 19 mph (31 km/h)
- Referee: Bob McElwee

Scoring summary
Q2	NE	Perryman 1 yard run (Garcia kick)	NE 7–0
Q2	IND	Dickerson 1 yard run (Biasucci kick)	Tie 7–7
Q4	NE	Morgan 26 yard pass from Flutie (Garcia kick)	NE 14–7
Q4	IND	Biasucci 20 yard field goal	NE 14–10
Q4	IND	Brooks 48 yard pass from Chandler (Biasucci kick)	IND 17–14
Q4	NE	Flutie 13 yard run (Garcia kick)	NE 21–17

=== Standings ===
AFC East
	W	L	T	PCT	DIV	CONF	PF	PA	STK
^{(2)} Buffalo Bills	12	4	0	.750	7–1	10–2	329	237	L1
Indianapolis Colts	9	7	0	.563	5–3	7–5	354	315	W1
New England Patriots	9	7	0	.563	5–3	7–5	250	284	L1
New York Jets	8	7	1	.531	3–5	6–7–1	372	354	W2
Miami Dolphins	6	10	0	.375	0–8	3–9	319	380	L1

== See also ==
- New England Patriots seasons
