= List of NFL players (Sa–Sme) =

This is a list of players who have appeared in at least one regular season or postseason game in the National Football League (NFL), American Football League (AFL), or All-America Football Conference (AAFC) and have a last name that falls between "Sa" and "Sme". For the rest of the S's, see list of NFL players (Smi–Sz). This list is accurate through the end of the 2025 NFL season.

== Sa ==
- Kelly Saalfeld
- Brad Saar
- Andy Sabados
- Ron Sabal
- Lou Saban
- Joe Sabasteanski
- Bill Sabatino
- Dwayne Sabb
- Tino Sabuco
- Tony Sacca
- Frank Sacco
- Lenny Sachs
- Frank Sachse
- Jack Sachse
- Jack Sack
- Norb Sacksteder
- Nick Sacrinty
- Rod Saddler
- Jimmy Saddler-McQueen
- Steve Sader
- Troy Sadowski
- Eddie Saenz
- Rodger Saffold
- Saint Saffold
- Pio Sagapolutele
- Floyd Sagely
- Ken Sager
- Anthony Sagnella
- Tom Saidock
- George Saimes
- Pat Saindon
- Brandon Saine
- Mike Sainristil
- Blaine Saipaia
- Abdul Salaam
- Ephraim Salaam
- Rashaan Salaam
- Greg Salas
- Andy Salata
- Paul Salata
- Joe Salave'a
- Jay Saldi
- Nick Saldiveri
- Dan Saleaumua
- Tarek Saleh
- Ed Salem
- Harvey Salem
- Sam Salemi
- Sean Salisbury
- Nate Salley
- Jerome Sally
- Mike Salmon
- Brian Salonen
- Jim Salsbury
- Jack Salscheider
- Bryant Salter
- Jamaree Salyer
- Andre' Sam
- P. K. Sam
- Nick Samac
- Ty Sambrailo
- Dru Samia
- Cameron Sample
- Chuck Sample
- Drew Sample
- James Sample
- Johnny Sample
- Lawrence Sampleton
- Archie Sampson
- Clint Sampson
- Demarco Sampson
- Dylan Sampson
- Eber Sampson
- Greg Sampson
- Howard Sampson
- Kevin Sampson
- B. J. Sams
- Ron Sams
- Michael Samson
- Seneca Samson
- Josh Samuda
- Asante Samuel
- Asante Samuel Jr.
- Curtis Samuel
- Deebo Samuel
- Don Samuel
- Khari Samuel
- Chris Samuels (born 1969)
- Chris Samuels (born 1977)
- Jaylen Samuels
- Stanford Samuels
- Terry Samuels
- Tony Samuels
- Carl Samuelson
- Bill Sanborn
- Garrison Sanborn
- Jack Sanborn
- Davis Sanchez
- John Sanchez
- Lupe Sanchez
- Mark Sanchez
- Rigoberto Sanchez
- Zack Sanchez
- Artie Sandberg
- Sandy Sandberg
- Dick Sandefur
- Bill Sandeman
- B. J. Sander
- Mark Sander
- Ace Sanders
- Barry Sanders
- Bob Sanders (born 1943)
- Bob Sanders (born 1981)
- Brandon Sanders
- Braylon Sanders
- Charlie Sanders
- Chris Sanders (born 1972)
- Chris Sanders (born 1973)
- Chuck Sanders
- Clarence Sanders
- Darnell Sanders
- Daryl Sanders
- Deac Sanders
- Deion Sanders
- Drew Sanders
- Emmanuel Sanders
- Eric Sanders
- Frank Sanders
- Gene Sanders
- Glenell Sanders
- Jack Sanders
- James Sanders
- Jason Sanders
- Ja'Tavion Sanders
- Joe Sanders
- Ken Sanders
- Lewis Sanders
- Lonnie Sanders
- Miles Sanders
- Myjai Sanders
- Paul Sanders
- Raheim Sanders
- Ricky Sanders
- Shedeur Sanders
- Spec Sanders
- Steve Sanders
- T. J. Sanders
- Thomas Sanders
- Reggie Sanderson
- Scott Sanderson
- Todd Sandham
- Bill Sandifer
- Dan Sandifer
- Curt Sandig
- Robert Sands
- Terdell Sands
- Alex Sandusky
- John Sandusky
- Mike Sandusky
- Justin Sandy
- Brian Sanford
- Jamarca Sanford
- Jim Sanford
- Leo Sanford
- Lucius Sanford
- Rick Sanford
- Sandy Sanford
- Jonas Sanker
- Bishop Sankey
- Darnell Sankey
- Ollie Sansen
- Tom Santi
- O. J. Santiago
- Joe Santone
- Frank Santora
- Cairo Santos
- Ryan Santoso
- Dan Santucci
- Mohamed Sanu
- Sekou Sanyika
- Dane Sanzenbacher
- Mickey Sanzotta
- Lauvale Sape
- Rick Sapienza
- Jesse Sapolu
- Benny Sapp
- Benny Sapp III
- Bob Sapp
- Cecil Sapp
- Gerome Sapp
- Patrick Sapp
- Ricky Sapp
- Theron Sapp
- Warren Sapp
- Al Sarafiny
- Tony Sarausky
- Phil Sarboe
- Tony Sardisco
- Foster Sarell
- Broderick Sargent
- Kevin Sargent
- Mekhi Sargent
- Harvey Sark
- Charley Sarratt
- Paul Sarringhaus
- Dan Sartin
- Martin Sartin
- Larry Sartori
- Don Sasa
- Tyler Sash
- Doug Satcher
- Samson Satele
- Ollie Satenstein
- Al Satterfield
- Brian Satterfield
- Howard Satterwhite
- Jeff Saturday
- Eric Saubert
- Craig Sauer
- Ed Sauer
- George Sauer
- George Sauer, Jr.
- Todd Sauerbrun
- Bill Saul
- Rich Saul
- Ron Saul
- Ben Sauls
- Mack Sauls
- Pete Saumer
- Buck Saunders
- Cedric Saunders
- C.J. Saunders
- De'Ante Saunders
- Jalen Saunders
- John Saunders
- Khalen Saunders
- Russ Saunders
- Weslye Saunders
- Stillwell Saunooke
- Cory Sauter
- Dantrell Savage
- Darnell Savage Jr.
- Josh Savage
- Sebastian Savage
- Tom Savage
- Tony Savage
- Jonah Savaiinaea
- Ollie Savatsky
- George Savitsky
- Nicky Savoie
- Joe Savoldi
- Buzz Sawyer
- Corey Sawyer
- Herm Sawyer
- Jack Sawyer
- John Sawyer
- Jon Sawyer
- Ken Sawyer
- Talance Sawyer
- James Saxon
- Mike Saxon
- Brian Saxton
- Jimmy Saxton
- Wes Saxton
- Gale Sayers
- Ron Sayers
- Jace Sayler
- Jacob Saylors
- Ralph Sazio

== Sb–Sc ==
- Ronald Sbranti
- Damik Scafe
- John Scafide
- Bo Scaife
- Charley Scales
- Dwight Scales
- Greg Scales
- Hurles Scales
- Patrick Scales
- Tegray Scales
- Ted Scalissi
- Johnny Scalzi
- Orlando Scandrick
- Jerry Scanlan
- Dewey Scanlon
- John Scanlon
- Rich Scanlon
- Jack Scarbath
- Sam Scarber
- Bo Scarbrough
- John Scardina
- Carmen Scardine
- Brennan Scarlett
- Jordan Scarlett
- Noel Scarlett
- Joe Scarpati
- Bob Scarpitto
- Mike Scarry
- Elmer Schaake
- Pete Schabarum
- A. J. Schable
- Mike Schad
- Don Schaefer
- Brian Schaefering
- J. K. Schaffer
- Joe Schaffer
- Pete Schaffnit
- Dick Schafrath
- Duke Schamel
- Zud Schammel
- Scott Schankweiler
- Eddie Scharer
- Max Scharping
- Ryan Schau
- Matt Schaub
- Carl Schaukowitch
- Greg Schaum
- Tony Scheffler
- Skippy Scheib
- Joe Schein
- Herb Schell
- Ed Schenk
- Nate Schenker
- Bernie Scherer
- Brandon Scherff
- Babe Scheuer
- Alex Schibanoff
- Henry Schichtle
- Doyle Schick
- Art Schiebel
- John Schiechl
- Jake Schifino
- Chaz Schilens
- Ralph Schilling
- Stephen Schilling
- Andy Schillinger
- Shann Schillinger
- Steve Schindler
- Caleb Schlauderaff
- John Schlecht
- Anthony Schlegel
- Vic Schleich
- Maury Schleicher
- Mark Schlereth
- Cory Schlesinger
- Vin Schleusner
- Art Schlichter
- Walt Schlinkman
- Todd Schlopy
- Austin Schlottmann
- Art Schmaehl
- Herm Schmarr
- Ray Schmautz
- Jim Schmedding
- Bob Schmidt
- Colton Schmidt
- George Schmidt
- Henry Schmidt
- Joe Schmidt
- John Schmidt
- Kermit Schmidt
- Roy Schmidt
- Terry Schmidt
- Joe Schmiesing
- Bob Schmit
- George Schmitt
- John Schmitt
- Owen Schmitt
- Ricky Schmitt
- Ted Schmitt
- Bob Schmitz
- John Michael Schmitz
- Steven Schnarr
- Mike Schneck
- Don Schneider
- John Schneider
- Leroy Schneider
- Herm Schneidman
- Bob Schnelker
- Spencer Schnell
- Otto Schnellbacher
- John Schneller
- Mike Schnitker
- Aaron Schobel
- Bo Schobel
- Matt Schobel
- Joe Schobert
- Leroy Schoemann
- Tom Schoen
- Ray Schoenke
- Michael Schofield
- O'Brien Schofield
- Roy Scholl
- Bob Scholtz
- Bruce Scholtz
- Nick Schommer
- Turk Schonert
- Brenden Schooler
- Luke Schoonmaker
- Ivan Schottel
- Marty Schottenheimer
- Derek Schouman
- Cody Schrader
- Jim Schrader
- Ryan Schraeder
- Mason Schreck
- Adam Schreiber
- Larry Schreiber
- Bill Schroeder (born 1923)
- Bill Schroeder (born 1971)
- Gene Schroeder
- Jay Schroeder
- Bill Schroll
- Ken Schroy
- Jim Schuber
- Eric Schubert
- Steve Schubert
- Jake Schuehle
- Karl Schuelke
- Roy Schuening
- Carl Schuette
- Paul Schuette
- Harry Schuh
- Jeff Schuh
- John Schuhmacher
- Bill Schuler
- Rick Schulte
- Lance Schulters
- Bill Schultz
- Charles Schultz
- Chris Schultz
- Dalton Schultz
- Elbie Schultz
- Heine Schultz
- John Schultz
- Pete Schultz
- Randy Schultz
- Jody Schulz
- Kurt Schulz
- Jake Schum
- Gregg Schumacher
- Kurt Schumacher
- Walt Schupp
- Dick Schuster
- Scott Schutt
- Ray Schwab
- Vic Schwall
- Ade Schwammel
- Jim Schwantz
- Anthony Schwartz
- Bryan Schwartz
- Don Schwartz
- Elmer Schwartz
- Geoff Schwartz
- Mitchell Schwartz
- Perry Schwartz
- Ted Schwarzer
- Brian Schweda
- John Schweder
- Gerhard Schwedes
- Scott Schwedes
- Bob Schweickert
- Dick Schweidler
- Stuart Schweigert
- Wes Schweitzer
- Bud Schwenk
- Brian Schwenke
- Carson Schwesinger
- John Sciarra
- Nick Sciba
- Joe Scibelli
- Mike Scifres
- Steve Scifres
- Brad Scioli
- Willard Scissum
- Steve Sciullo
- Josh Scobee
- Josh Scobey
- Eric Scoggins
- Ron Scoggins
- Nick Scollard
- Glenn Scolnik
- Bart Scott
- Bernard Scott
- Bill Scott
- Bo Scott
- Bob Scott
- Bobby Scott
- Boston Scott
- Bryan Scott
- Carey Scott
- Carlos Scott
- Cedric Scott
- Chad Scott
- Chris Scott (born 1961)
- Chris Scott (born 1987)
- Chuck Scott
- Clarence Scott (born 1944)
- Clarence Scott (born 1949)
- Clyde Scott
- Da'Mari Scott
- Da'Rel Scott
- Daniel Scott
- Darell Scott
- Darnay Scott
- Darrion Scott
- Dave Scott
- Delontae Scott
- DeQuincy Scott
- Ed Scott
- Freddie Scott (born 1952)
- Freddie Scott (born 1974)
- Gari Scott
- George Scott
- Greg Scott
- Guss Scott
- Herbert Scott
- Ian Scott
- Jack Scott
- Jake Scott (born 1945)
- Jake Scott (born 1981)
- Jaleel Scott
- James Scott
- JK Scott
- Joe Scott
- Johnny Scott
- Jonathan Scott
- Josiah Scott
- Kevin Scott (born 1963)
- Kevin Scott (born 1969)
- Lance Scott
- Les Scott
- Lew Scott
- Lindsay Scott
- Lynn Scott
- Malcolm Scott
- Ned Scott
- Nick Scott
- Niles Scott
- Patrick Scott
- Perry Scott
- Phil Scott
- Prince Scott
- Ralph Scott
- Randy Scott
- Rashawn Scott
- Ronald Scott
- Sean Scott
- Stanley Scott
- Tim Scott
- Todd Scott
- Tom Scott (born 1930)
- Tom Scott (born 1970)
- Tony Scott
- Trent Scott
- Trevor Scott
- Tyler Scott
- Vernon Scott
- Victor Scott
- Vince Scott
- Walter Scott
- Wilbert Scott
- Willie Scott
- Yusuf Scott
- Zavier Scott
- Ben Scotti
- Colin Scotts
- Nic Scourton
- Bob Scrabis
- Kirk Scrafford
- Bucky Scribner
- Rob Scribner
- Tracy Scroggins
- Greg Scruggs
- Juice Scruggs
- Ted Scruggs
- Ed Scrutchins
- Joe Scudero
- John Scully
- Mike Scully
- Mike Scurlock
- Stan Sczurek

== Se ==
- Todd Seabaugh
- Charlie Seabright
- Tom Seabron
- Paul Seal
- Randy Sealby
- Eugene Seale
- Sam Seale
- George Seals
- Leon Seals
- Ray Seals
- Ricky Seals-Jones
- Sammy Seamster
- Bill Searcey
- Da'Norris Searcy
- Leon Searcy
- Arron Sears
- Corey Sears
- Dick Sears
- Jimmy Sears
- Vic Sears
- George Seasholtz
- Junior Seau
- Jonas Seawright
- Mark Seay
- Virgil Seay
- Mike Sebastian
- Nick Sebek
- Sam Sebo
- Herman Seborg
- Walt Sechrist
- Joe Secord
- Scott Secules
- Len Sedbrook
- Tim Seder
- Robert Sedlock
- Chris Sedoris
- John Seedborg
- Frank Seeds
- George Seeman
- Austin Seferian-Jenkins
- Maury Segal
- Rocky Segretta
- Jason Sehorn
- Austin Seibert
- Ed Seibert (born 1896)
- Ed Seibert (born 1904)
- Champ Seibold
- Red Seick
- Red Seidelson
- Mike Seidman
- Mike Seifert
- Dexter Seigler
- Richard Seigler
- Paul Seiler
- Larry Seiple
- Mohammed Seisay
- Warren Seitz
- Gene Selawski
- Rob Selby
- Ron Selesky
- Clarence Self
- Andy Selfridge
- Frank Seliger
- Goldie Sellers
- Lance Sellers
- Mike Sellers
- Ron Sellers
- Dewey Selmon
- Lee Roy Selmon
- Harry Seltzer
- George Selvie
- Bernie Semes
- Tony Semple
- Deadrin Senat
- Greg Senat
- Andrew Sendejo
- Lyle Sendlein
- Robin Sendlein
- Bill Senn
- Jordan Senn
- Frank Seno
- Coty Sensabaugh
- Gerald Sensabaugh
- Dean Sensanbaugher
- Joe Senser
- Mike Sensibaugh
- Rafael Septién
- Daniel Sepulveda
- George Sergienko
- Wash Serini
- Trey Sermon
- Kato Serwanga
- Wasswa Serwanga
- Clint Session
- Tom Sestak
- Joe Setcavage
- Joe Setron
- Mark Setterstrom
- John Settle
- Tim Settle
- Tawambi Settles
- Tony Settles
- Bobby Setzer
- Rich Seubert
- Isaac Seumalo
- Frank Seurer
- Jeff Severson
- Jeff Sevy
- Adam Seward
- Harley Sewell
- Nephi Sewell
- Noah Sewell
- Penei Sewell
- Steve Sewell
- Brent Sexton
- Lin Sexton
- Frank Seyboth
- Si Seyfrit
- Seymour
- Bob Seymour
- Jim Seymour
- Kevon Seymour
- Paul Seymour
- Richard Seymour
- Ryan Seymour

== Sh ==
- Al-Hajj Shabazz
- Siddeeq Shabazz
- Don Shackelford
- Sam Shade
- Craig Shaffer
- George Shaffer
- Kevin Shaffer
- Leland Shaffer
- Rashid Shaheed
- Adam Shaheen
- Stanley Shakespeare
- Khalil Shakir
- Aaron Shampklin
- Henry Shank
- Ron Shanklin
- Simon Shanks
- Scott Shanle
- Shanley
- Jim Shanley
- Bob Shann
- Carver Shannon
- John Shannon
- Larry Shannon
- Randy Shannon
- Jack Shapiro
- Nate Share
- Ed Sharkey
- Ed Sharockman
- Dan Sharp
- Everett Sharp
- Hunter Sharp
- Rick Sharp
- David Sharpe
- Luis Sharpe
- Montique Sharpe
- Shannon Sharpe
- Sterling Sharpe
- Tajae Sharpe
- Darren Sharper
- Jamie Sharper
- Darryl Sharpton
- Tyler Shatley
- Harry Shaub
- Matt Shaughnessy
- Tyrell Shavers
- Tyrone Shavers
- Ben Shaw
- Billy Shaw
- Bob Shaw (born 1921)
- Bob Shaw (born 1947)
- Bobby Shaw
- Charlie Shaw
- Connor Shaw
- Dennis Shaw
- Ed Shaw
- Eric Shaw
- George Shaw
- Glenn Shaw
- Harold Shaw
- Jesse Shaw
- Josh Shaw (born 1979)
- Josh Shaw (born 1992)
- Nate Shaw
- Pete Shaw
- Ricky Shaw
- Robert Shaw
- Scott Shaw
- Sedrick Shaw
- Terrance Shaw
- Tim Shaw
- Jerry Shay
- Ryan Shazier
- Ernest Shazor
- Aaron Shea
- Pat Shea
- DeShawn Shead
- Jabaal Sheard
- Shag Sheard
- Brad Shearer
- Ronald Shearer
- Joe Shearin
- Larry Shears
- Kenny Shedd
- Ed Shedlosky
- Fred Sheehan
- Paul Sheeks
- Kory Sheets
- Cameron Sheffield
- Chris Sheffield
- Kendall Sheffield
- Ron Shegog
- Rashaan Shehee
- Vincent Shekleton
- John Shelburne
- Derrick Shelby
- Ty Shelby
- Willie Shelby
- Brady Sheldon
- James Sheldon
- Mike Sheldon
- Art Shell
- Brandon Shell
- Donnie Shell
- Todd Shell
- Deck Shelley
- Duke Shelley
- Elbert Shelley
- Jonathan Shelley
- Chris Shelling
- Kendel Shello
- Alec Shellogg
- Anthony Shelton
- Coleman Shelton
- Daimon Shelton
- Danny Shelton
- Eric Shelton
- L. J. Shelton
- Murray Shelton
- Richard Shelton
- Tyler Shelvin
- Prince Shembo
- Laviska Shenault Jr.
- Paul Shenefelt
- John Samuel Shenker
- Charlie Shepard
- Derrick Shepard
- Russell Shepard
- Sterling Shepard
- Austin Shepherd
- Bill Shepherd
- Darrius Shepherd
- Edell Shepherd
- Gannon Shepherd
- Jacoby Shepherd
- JaCorey Shepherd
- Johnny Shepherd
- Leslie Shepherd
- Nathan Shepherd
- Dakoda Shepley
- Ashley Sheppard
- Henry Sheppard
- Kelvin Sheppard
- Lito Sheppard
- Malcolm Sheppard
- Marcus Sherels
- Dave Sherer
- Trent Sherfield
- Jamie Sheriff
- Stan Sheriff
- Jerry Sherk
- Bob Sherlag
- Allie Sherman
- Anthony Sherman
- Bob Sherman
- Heath Sherman
- Richard Sherman
- Rod Sherman
- Solly Sherman
- Tom Sherman
- Will Sherman
- William Sherman
- Mike Sherrard
- Bud Sherrod
- Derek Sherrod
- Gerry Sherry
- Tim Sherwin
- Jamien Sherwood
- Rhoten Shetley
- Visanthe Shiancoe
- James Shibest
- Joe Shield
- Billy Shields
- Burrell Shields
- Jon Shields
- Lebron Shields
- Paul Shields
- Sam Shields
- Scott Shields
- Will Shields
- Dick Shiner
- John Shinners
- Don Shinnick
- Jerry Shipkey
- A. Q. Shipley
- Jordan Shipley
- Will Shipley
- Billy Shipp
- Jackie Shipp
- Joe Shipp
- Marcel Shipp
- Abe Shires
- Fred Shirey
- Gary Shirk
- John Shirk
- George Shirkey
- Jason Shirley
- Josh Shirley
- Marion Shirley
- Clay Shiver
- Rex Shiver
- Sanders Shiver
- Jason Shivers
- Roy Shivers
- Wes Shivers
- Boris Shlapak
- Roger Shoals
- Jeff Shoate
- Rod Shoate
- Jeremy Shockey
- Arnie Shockley
- Bill Shockley
- Hub Shoemake
- Hal Shoener
- Herb Shoener
- Del Shofner
- Jim Shofner
- John Shonk
- Chuck Shonta
- Al Shook
- Fred Shook
- Brandon Short
- Jason Short
- Kawann Short
- Laval Short
- Jim Shorter
- Justin Shorter
- George Shorthose
- Cecil Shorts
- Peter Shorts
- Tyler Shough
- Darin Shoulders
- Paul Shoults
- Spencer Shrader
- Shriner
- Darrell Shropshire
- Caleb Shudak
- Pete Shufelt
- Clyde Shugart
- Bret Shugarts
- David Shula
- Don Shula
- Heath Shuler
- Mickey Shuler
- Mickey Shuler, Jr.
- Steve Shull
- Johnny Shultz
- Mike Shumann
- Mark Shumate
- Ron Shumon
- Mark Shupe
- Marshall Shurnas
- Bert Shurtleff
- Red Shurtliffe
- Hubert Shurtz
- Don Shy
- Les Shy

== Si ==
- Mike Siani
- Mike Siano
- Tony Siano
- Junior Siavii
- Garrett Sickels
- Lawrence Sidbury
- Jimmy Sidle
- Dainon Sidney
- Alex Sidorik
- Wally Sieb
- Trent Sieg
- John Siegal
- Herb Siegert
- Wayne Siegert
- Orville Siegfried
- Jules Siegle
- Zach Sieler
- Larry Siemering
- Trevor Siemian
- Chuck Sieminski
- Jeff Siemon
- Troy Sienkiewicz
- Stan Sieracki
- Stephen Sieradzki
- Steve Sierocinski
- Herb Sies
- Eric Sievers
- Dom Sigillo
- Ricky Siglar
- Marques Sigle
- Joe Signaigo
- Sig Sigurdson
- Vai Sikahema
- Mike Sikich
- Rudy Sikich
- Mike Sikora
- Sam Silas
- Amini Silatolu
- Ian Silberman
- Dan Sileo
- Brandon Siler
- Rich Siler
- Sealver Siliga
- Joe Silipo
- Frank Sillin
- David Sills
- Josh Sills
- Cam'Ron Silmon-Craig
- Jamie Silva
- Mana Silva
- Ricardo Silva
- Nilo Silvan
- Nesta Jade Silvera
- Carl Silvestri
- Don Silvestri
- Alex Silvestro
- Butch Simas
- Ken Simendinger
- Don Simensen
- John Simerson
- Tracy Simien
- Milt Simington
- Arnie Simkus
- Mike Simmonds
- Anthony Simmons
- Bob Simmons
- Brian Simmons
- Cleo Simmons
- Clyde Simmons
- Dave Simmons (born 1943)
- Dave Simmons (born 1957)
- Ed Simmons
- Elijah Simmons
- Floyd Simmons
- Isaiah Simmons
- Jack Simmons
- Jason Simmons
- Jeff Simmons
- Jeffery Simmons
- Jerry Simmons
- Jim Simmons
- John Simmons
- Jordan Simmons
- Josh Simmons
- Justin Simmons
- Kendall Simmons
- King Simmons
- Lachavious Simmons
- Leon Simmons
- Marcello Simmons
- Michael Simmons
- Roy Simmons
- Sam Simmons
- Stacey Simmons
- Terrance Simmons
- Tony Simmons (born 1962)
- Tony Simmons (born 1974)
- Victor Simmons
- Wayne Simmons
- Bob Simms
- Chris Simms
- Matt Simms
- Phil Simms
- Cody Simon
- Corey Simon
- Deon Simon
- Jim Simon
- John Simon (born 1978)
- John Simon (born 1990)
- Tharold Simon
- Mike Simone
- Mark Simoneau
- Lenny Simonetti
- Ed Simonini
- John Simons
- Keith Simons
- Kevin Simons
- Dave Simonson
- Scott Simonson
- Ken Simonton
- Maurice Simpkins
- Ron Simpkins
- Torricelli Simpkins
- Al Simpson
- Antoine Simpson
- Bill Simpson
- Bob Simpson
- Carl Simpson
- Chad Simpson
- Eber Simpson
- Howard Simpson
- Jackie Simpson (born 1934)
- Jackie Simpson (born 1936)
- Jaylin Simpson
- Jerome Simpson
- Jimmy Simpson
- John Simpson
- Keith Simpson
- Ko Simpson
- Mike Simpson
- Nate Simpson
- O. J. Simpson
- Tim Simpson
- Travis Simpson
- Trenton Simpson
- Willie Simpson
- Barry Sims
- Ben Sims
- Billy Sims
- Cam Sims
- Charles Sims
- Darryl Sims
- David Sims (born 1955)
- David Sims (born 1986)
- Dion Sims
- Ernie Sims
- Eugene Sims
- George Sims
- Jack Sims
- James Sims
- Jim Sims
- Joe Sims
- Keith Sims
- Ken Sims
- Kenneth Sims
- LeShaun Sims
- Marvin Sims
- Mickey Sims
- Pat Sims
- Reggie Sims
- Rob Sims
- Ryan Sims
- Steven Sims
- Tom Sims
- Tommy Sims
- Wes Sims
- William Sims
- Mike Sims-Walker
- Kaseem Sinceno
- Matt Sinclair
- Michael Sinclair
- Curt Singer
- Karl Singer
- Walt Singer
- Bill Singletary
- Devin Singletary
- Mike Singletary
- Reggie Singletary
- Alex Singleton
- Alshermond Singleton
- Bill Singleton
- Chris Singleton
- John Singleton
- Nate Singleton
- Ron Singleton
- Steve Sinko
- Frank Sinkovitz
- Frankie Sinkwich
- Ben Sinnott
- Greg Sinnott
- John Sinnott
- Clint Sintim
- Brian Sipe
- Arryn Siposs
- Bobby Sippio
- Tony Siragusa
- Jeremiah Sirles
- Jackson Sirmon
- Peter Sirmon
- George Sirochman
- Jerry Sisemore
- Johnny Sisk
- John Sisk, Jr.
- Brian Sisley
- Scott Sisson
- Manny Sistrunk
- Otis Sistrunk
- Vinnie Sites
- Emil Sitko
- Josh Sitton
- Jim Sivell
- Mike Siwek
- Deyon Sizer

== Sk–Sme ==
- Jim Skaggs
- Justin Skaggs
- Paul Skansi
- Cam Skattebo
- Daryle Skaugstad
- Gil Skeate
- John Skelton
- Doug Skene
- Joe Skibinski
- John Skibinski
- Deontae Skinner
- Frank J. Skinner
- Gerald Skinner
- JL Skinner
- Lew Skinner
- Quentin Skinner
- Dan Skipper
- Tuzar Skipper
- Joe Skladany
- Leo Skladany
- Tom Skladany
- John Sklopan
- Stan Skoczen
- Bob Skoglund
- Nick Skorich
- Bob Skoronski
- Ed Skoronski
- Peter Skoronski
- John Skorupan
- Shayne Skov
- Jim Skow
- Ben Skowronek
- Greg Skrepenak
- Buster Skrine
- Dave Skudin
- Justin Skule
- Matt Skura
- Dan Skuta
- Lou Slaby
- Fritz Slackford
- Chad Slade
- Chris Slade
- George Slagle
- Duke Slater
- Howie Slater
- Jackie Slater
- Jackson Slater
- Mark Slater
- Matthew Slater
- Rashawn Slater
- Walt Slater
- Mike Slaton
- Steve Slaton
- Tedarrell Slaton
- Tony Slaton
- Chad Slaughter
- Chuck Slaughter
- Mickey Slaughter
- T. J. Slaughter
- Webster Slaughter
- Matt Slauson
- Darius Slay
- Henry Slay
- Darius Slayton
- Jeremy Slechta
- Leroy Sledge
- Red Sleight
- Richard Sligh
- Steve Slivinski
- Bonnie Sloan
- David Sloan
- Dwight Sloan
- Steve Sloan
- Sam Sloman
- Pete Slone
- Phil Slosburg
- Elmer Slough
- Greg Slough
- Emil Slovacek
- Marty Slovak
- Kedon Slovis
- Scott Slutzker
- Joey Slye
- Bill Slyker
- Stan Smagala
- Alex Smail
- Donovan Small
- Eldridge Small
- Fred Small
- George Small
- Gerald Small
- Jessie Small
- John Small
- Kiero Small
- O.J. Small
- Torrance Small
- Fred Smalls
- Wendell Smallwood
- Ian Smart
- Rod Smart
- Tanzel Smart
- Stone Smartt
- Metz Smeach
- Eric Smedley
- Joel Smeenge
- Rudy Smeja
- Brad Smelley
- DeAndre Smelter
- Don Smerek
- Fred Smerlas
