= Lafrenière =

Lafrenière (French pronunciation: [la.fʁə.njɛʁ]) is a French family name.

== Notable people ==
- Alexis Lafrenière (born 2001), Canadian ice hockey player
- Bill LaFreniere, American football player
- Gilbert LaFreniere (1934–2025), American ecological philosopher
- Ian Lafrenière (born 1972), Canadian politician
- Jason Lafreniere (1966–2026), Canadian ice hockey player
- Jean-Baptiste Lafrenière (1874–1912), Canadian pianist, composer
- Réjean Lafrenière (1935–2016), Canadian politician
- Robert Lafrenière (1924–2012), Canadian lawyer, politician
