= Tom Neumann =

American football player (born 1940)

Tom J Neumann
No. 36
- Position: Halfback

Personal information
- Born: March 4, 1940 (age 86); Peshtigo, Wisconsin, U.S.
- Listed height: 5 ft 11 in (1.80 m)
- Listed weight: 205 lb (93 kg)

Career information
- College: Northern Michigan
- AFL draft: 1963: 17th round, 135th overall pick

Career history
- Boston Patriots (1963)

Career statistics
- Rushing yards: 148
- Games played: 10
- Stats at Pro Football Reference

Tom Neumann (born March 4, 1940) was a player in the American Football League (AFL) for the Boston Patriots in 1963 as a halfback. He played at the collegiate level at Northern Michigan University and the University of Wisconsin–Madison.

== Biography ==
Neumann was born on March 4, 1940, in Peshtigo, Wisconsin.

== See also ==
- New England Patriots players
