= Benton Reed =

American football player (born 1963)

No. 71
- Position: Defensive end

Personal information
- Born: May 7, 1963 (age 63); Baton Rouge, Louisiana, U.S.
- Listed height: 6 ft 6 in (1.98 m)
- Listed weight: 265 lb (120 kg)

Career information
- High school: Woodlawn (Old Jefferson, Louisiana)
- College: Ole Miss
- NFL draft: 1986: 10th round, 250th overall pick

Career history
- Tampa Bay Buccaneers (1986)*; New England Patriots (1987)
- * Offseason or practice squad member only

Career NFL statistics
- Games played: 3
- Games started: 3
- Stats at Pro Football Reference

Harry Benton “Ben” Reed (born May 7, 1963) is an American former professional football player who played defensive end. He played in the National Football League (NFL) for the New England Patriots for three games during the 1987 season.

== Early life and college ==
Reed played football at Woodlawn High School in Old Jefferson, Louisiana and at University of Mississippi.

== Professional career ==
In the 1986 NFL draft, Reed was selected by the Tampa Bay Buccaneers in the tenth round with the 250th overall pick. In the 1987 NFL season, Reed played in weeks 3, 4, and 5 with the New England Patriots, for the only three regular season appearances of his NFL career. A shoulder injury forced him into retirement.

== Personal life ==
Benton Reed's son, Michael Reed, is a former professional baseball player in Major League Baseball (MLB).
