= Guss Scott =

American football player (born 1982)

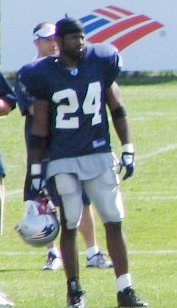
- Scott at 2005 training camp

No. 29
- Position: Safety

Personal information
- Born: May 21, 1982 (age 44); Jacksonville, Florida, U.S.
- Listed height: 5 ft 10 in (1.78 m)
- Listed weight: 205 lb (93 kg)

Career information
- High school: Trinity Christian Academy (Jacksonville, Florida)
- College: Florida
- NFL draft: 2004: 3rd round, 95th overall pick

Career history
- New England Patriots (2004–2005); Houston Texans (2006); New York Jets (2006); New England Patriots (2006); Miami Dolphins (2006)*; Seattle Seahawks (2006)*
- * Offseason or practice squad member only

Awards and highlights
- Super Bowl champion (XXXIX); 2× Second-team All-SEC (2002, 2003)
- Stats at Pro Football Reference

Guss T'Mar Scott (born May 21, 1982) is an American former professional football player was a safety in the National Football League (NFL) for two seasons during the early 2000s. Scott played college football for the Florida Gators before playing in the NFL for the New England Patriots and Houston Texans.

== Early life ==
Scott was born in Jacksonville, Florida in 1982. He attended Trinity Christian Academy in Jacksonville, and played for the TCA high school football team. He played on offense as a running back and defense as a defensive back, and was a three-year starter. As a senior in 1999, he was recognized as a Florida Class 2A second-team selection at running back while rushing for 1,920 yards and compiling five interceptions.

== College career ==
Scott accepted an athletic scholarship to attend the University of Florida in Gainesville, Florida, where he played strong safety for coach Steve Spurrier and coach Ron Zook's Florida Gators football teams from 2000 to 2003. He saw action on special teams as a true freshman and sophomore, and was a regular starter at safety during his junior and senior seasons. He was recognized as the Gators' defensive back of the year in 2002, and led the Southeastern Conference (SEC) in forced fumbles in 2003.

== Professional career ==
Pre-draft measurables
Height	Weight	Arm length	Hand span	40-yard dash	10-yard split	20-yard split	Vertical jump	Broad jump	Bench press
5 ft 10 3/8 in (1.79 m)	204 lb (93 kg)	31 in (0.79 m)	8 7/8 in (0.23 m)	4.50 s	1.63 s	2.63 s	39.0 in (0.99 m)	10 ft 4 in (3.15 m)	20 reps
All values from NFL Combine

The New England Patriots chose Scott in the third round with the 95th overall pick in the 2004 NFL draft. He was a member of the Patriots during the 2004 and 2005 seasons. Scott spent parts of the 2006 NFL season on the rosters of the Houston Texans, Miami Dolphins and New York Jets. He finished his NFL career on the practice squad of the Seattle Seahawks. In three NFL regular seasons, Scott played in eleven regular season games and started two of them.

== See also ==
- List of Florida Gators in the NFL draft
- List of New England Patriots players
