= De'Ante Saunders =

American football player (born 1992)

No. 40
- Position: Defensive back

Personal information
- Born: September 19, 1992 (age 34); Philadelphia, Pennsylvania, U.S.
- Listed height: 5 ft 9 in (1.75 m)
- Listed weight: 187 lb (85 kg)

Career information
- High school: DeLand (DeLand, Florida)
- College: Tennessee State
- NFL draft: 2015: undrafted

Career history
- Cleveland Browns (2015)

Career NFL statistics
- Total tackles: 1
- Stats at Pro Football Reference

De'Ante Tymon "Pop" Saunders (pronounced dee-AHN-tay) (born September 19, 1992) is an American former professional football player who was a defensive back in the National Football League (NFL). He played college football for the Tennessee State Tigers. He was signed as an undrafted free agent by the Cleveland Browns.

== High school ==
Saunders attended DeLand High School where he played running back and defensive back. During his sophomore season DeLand advanced through the playoffs, losing state championship. As a junior, he rushed for 1,634 yards and 23 touchdowns. DeLand once again reached the state championship game. As a senior, Saunders, as a running back, rushed the ball 25 times for 140 yards and two touchdowns while catching one pass for one yard.

While at DeLand, he was named the 2009, he was named Class 6A First-team All-State defensive back and All-Central Florida Defensive Player of the Year by the Orlando Sentinel. In 2010 Class 6A Florida Athletic Coaches Association Player of the Year for Seminole and Volusia counties. He was also teammates with future NFL running back Mike Gillislee. While being recruited, Saunders chose Florida over South Carolina, Ole Miss, Clemson, Cincinnati, South Florida and Florida International.

== College career ==
=== Florida ===
Saunders originally attended Florida in 2011 and 2012.

As a freshman, he appeared in 12 games recording 26 tackles, one tackle-for-loss, while also recording two interceptions, one returned for a touchdown. He also returned six punts for 25 yards. The following season, he appeared in eight games, starting seven at either nickelback or safety. For the season he recorded 18 tackles and recorded one interception and one fumble recovery. He also returned five punts for 39 yards. He missed the first two games of the season for what was said to be a hamstring injury and the final two for a knee injury.

After the 2012 season, Saunders and offensive tackle Matt Patchan announced they were transferring out of Florida.

For his career at Florida, he started 16 of 20 games.

=== Tennessee State ===
After the 2012 season, he transferred to Tennessee State. While there he started 19 of 24 games recording 67 tackles, 15 passes defensed, nine interceptions. He also recorded 57 punt returns for 373 yards and a touchdown.

== Professional career ==
After going undrafted in the 2015 NFL draft Saunders signed with the Cleveland Browns. He was one of the Browns final cuts on September 5, 2015. The next day he was re-signed to the team's practice squad. On November 4, he was called up to the Browns active roster. One day after being called up to the active roster, Saunders made his NFL debut in the Browns 31-10 loss to the Cincinnati Bengals. During the game, he recorded his first career tackle. He was released on November 9. On November 11, he was re-signed to the Browns practice squad. On December 28, after his Christmas Day arrest, he was released by the Browns.

== Personal life ==
In December 2015, Saunders along with teammate Armonty Bryant were arrested during a traffic stop on Interstate 71 in Brook Park, Ohio. Saunders was pulled over while driving 75 mph in a 60 MPH zone. After being pulled over, he refused to take a breathalyzer test. Saunders was found to be in possession of a handgun. He was also cited for driving under the influence. While Bryant was in possession of Adderall. Saunders pleaded not guilty.

In February 2016, Saunders and Bryant were both indicted on felony charges. Saunders was charged for improperly handling firearms in a motor vehicle.
