= George Shaffer =

American football player (1910–1971)

No. 38
- Position: Blocking back

Personal information
- Born: June 20, 1910
- Died: April 23, 1971 (aged 60)
- Listed height: 6 ft 0 in (1.83 m)
- Listed weight: 190 lb (86 kg)

Career information
- College: Washington & Jefferson

Career history
- Pittsburgh Pirates (1933)
- Stats at Pro Football Reference

George Adam Shaffer (June 20, 1910 – April 23, 1971) was an American professional football player for the Pittsburgh Pirates. He attended high school in Greensburg, Pennsylvania. He attended Washington & Jefferson College.
