= Bill LaFreniere =

Football player

No. 88
- Position: Wide receiver

Personal information
- Listed height: 5 ft 10 in (1.78 m)
- Listed weight: 185 lb (84 kg)

Career information
- High school: Marlborough (Marlborough, Massachusetts)
- College: Northeastern
- NFL draft: 1982: undrafted

Career history
- New England Patriots (1987)

Bill LaFreniere is an American former professional football wide receiver who played for the New England Patriots in the National Football League (NFL) as a replacement player during the 1987 NFL players strike. He played college football at Northeastern University.

== Playing career ==
=== College career ===
LaFreniere played college football at Northeastern University from 1978 to 1981.

=== Semi-pro career ===
LaFreniere played five seasons of semi-pro football in the Eastern Football League (EFL).

=== New England Patriots ===
LaFreniere signed with the New England Patriots as a replacement player during the 1987 NFL players strike.
