= Pio Sagapolutele =

American Samoan football player (1969–2009)

No. 75, 99
- Positions: Defensive tackle, defensive end

Personal information
- Born: November 28, 1969; American Samoa
- Died: June 7, 2009 (aged 39); Chandler, Arizona, U.S.
- Listed height: 6 ft 6 in (1.98 m)
- Listed weight: 297 lb (135 kg)

Career information
- College: San Diego State
- NFL draft: 1991: 4th round, 85th overall pick

Career history
- Cleveland Browns (1991–1995); New England Patriots (1996); New Orleans Saints (1997–1998); Carolina Panthers (1999)*
- * Offseason or practice squad member only

Career NFL statistics
- Tackles: 119
- Sacks: 7.0
- Stats at Pro Football Reference

Pio Alika Sagapolutele (November 28, 1969 – June 7, 2009) was a Samoan professional football defensive tackle who played seven seasons in the National Football League (NFL) for the Cleveland Browns, the New England Patriots, and the New Orleans Saints. He was selected by the Browns in the fourth round of the 1991 NFL draft. He started in Super Bowl XXXI for the New England Patriots. He played college football at San Diego State University.

He was born in American Samoa and grew up in Kalihi, Hawaii, where he lived in Kuhio Park Terrace (KPT). He attended Marynoll High school and played football for PAC-5 where they won the state championship in 1985. He had 3 children, Pio Jr, Malia and Sky. Pio died of an aneurysm on June 7, 2009, in Chandler, Arizona, where he lived. Following his death his wife sued the National Football League and football helmet maker Riddell Inc. alleging that his death was caused by brain injuries. She reached a settlement with the two defendants in April 2017.
