= Eric Stokes (American football guard) =

American football player (born 1962)

No. 78
- Position: Guard

Personal information
- Born: January 13, 1962 (age 64); Derby, Connecticut, U.S.
- Listed height: 6 ft 4 in (1.93 m)
- Listed weight: 255 lb (116 kg)

Career information
- High school: Ansonia (Ansonia, Connecticut)
- College: Northeastern (1981–1984)
- NFL draft: 1985: 6th round, 148th overall pick

Career history
- Cincinnati Bengals (1985)*; New York Jets (1986)*; San Francisco 49ers (1987)*; New England Patriots (1987)
- * Offseason or practice squad member only

Career NFL statistics
- Games played: 1
- Games started: 1
- Stats at Pro Football Reference

Eric Stokes (born January 13, 1962) is an American former professional football player who was a guard in the National Football League (NFL) who played for the New England Patriots. He played college football for the Northeastern Huskies. Stokes was selected in the sixth round with the 148th pick by the Cincinnati Bengals in the 1985 NFL draft. In his career, he played in and started one game in the 1987 season with the Patriots.
