= Toby Williams (American football) =

American football player (born 1959)

No. 90
- Position: Defensive lineman

Personal information
- Born: November 9, 1959 (age 66); Washington, D.C., U.S.
- Listed height: 6 ft 3 in (1.91 m)
- Listed weight: 264 lb (120 kg)

Career information
- High school: Woodrow Wilson (Washington, D.C.)
- College: Nebraska
- NFL draft: 1983: 10th round, 265th overall pick

Career history
- New England Patriots (1983–1988); Green Bay Packers (1989)*
- * Offseason or practice squad member only

Awards and highlights
- Second-team All-Big Eight (1982)

Career NFL statistics
- Sacks: 15
- Fumble recoveries: 1
- Stats at Pro Football Reference

Tobias Williams (born November 19, 1959) is an American former professional football player who was a defensive lineman in the National Football League (NFL). He played college football for the Nebraska Cornhuskers and was selected by the New York Jets in the 10th round of the 1983 NFL draft. He played six seasons, as a defensive end and defensive tackle, all with the New England Patriots.

The 1987 season was interrupted by a labor dispute. Soon after the strike began, the Patriots coaching staff accused Williams of throwing a beer bottle at replacement players during a confrontation at a union picket line. Williams missed training camp the next summer; the Patriots retained his rights but they gave him permission to negotiate with other teams. He signed with the Patriots just before the season began. He retired from professional football after that 1988 season.

Since the mid-1990s, he has been an assistant coach at several high schools in suburban Boston, as well as at Bridgewater State College, Dean College and the University at Buffalo.

His daughter Candace Williams was a star college basketball player with the University of New Hampshire Wildcats through the 2009-10 season.
