= Ricky Atkinson =

American football player (born 1965)

No. 22
- Position: Cornerback

Personal information
- Born: August 28, 1965 (age 61); Middletown, Connecticut, U.S.
- Listed height: 6 ft 0 in (1.83 m)
- Listed weight: 175 lb (79 kg)

Career information
- High school: Valley Regional (Deep River, Connecticut)
- College: Southern Connecticut State
- NFL draft: 1987: undrafted

Career history
- New England Patriots (1987)*; Cincinnati Bengals (1987)*; Phoenix Cardinals (1987)*; New England Patriots (1987); Indianapolis Colts (1988)*
- * Offseason or practice squad member only

Career NFL statistics
- Games played: 1
- Stats at Pro Football Reference

Richard E. "Ricky" Atkinson Jr. (born August 28, 1965) is an American former professional football player who played cornerback in 1987 for the New England Patriots in the National Football League (NFL).

Atkinson played college football at Southern Connecticut State from 1983 to 1986 as a cornerback, where he was a four-year starter and a member of the Division II All-New England and All-ECAC Division II teams. He was named a co-captain in 1985. During his senior year, he set a school record for career interceptions and was named the New England Division II defensive player of the year and to the Kodak Coaches College Division All-American football team. Atkinson also was named a 1986-87 New England Athlete of the Year.

He signed with the New England Patriots in May 1987, before he was waived in late August. Atkinson was a member of the Cincinnati Bengals and Phoenix Cardinals rosters during the 1987 National Football League Players Association strike, but was released before appearing in a game. He then re-signed with the Patriots in October 1987. Atkinson appeared in one game before being placed on waivers in late October.

In May 1988, he signed with the Indianapolis Colts, but was released in July before the upcoming season began.
