= Jerry McCabe (American football) =

American football player (born 1965)

No. 52, 92
- Position: Linebacker

Personal information
- Born: January 25, 1965 (age 61); Detroit, Michigan, U.S.
- Listed height: 6 ft 1 in (1.85 m)
- Listed weight: 225 lb (102 kg)

Career information
- High school: De La Salle (Detroit)
- College: Holy Cross
- NFL draft: 1987: undrafted

Career history
- New England Patriots (1987); Kansas City Chiefs (1988)

Career NFL statistics
- Sacks: 1
- Stats at Pro Football Reference

Jerome Francis McCabe (born January 25, 1965) is an American former professional football player who was a linebacker for the New England Patriots and the Kansas City Chiefs of the National Football League (NFL). He played college football for the Holy Cross Crusaders.
