= Sammy Martin =

American football player (born 1965)

No. 82, 86
- Position: Wide receiver

Personal information
- Born: August 21, 1965 (age 61); Gretna, Louisiana, U.S.
- Listed height: 5 ft 11 in (1.80 m)
- Listed weight: 175 lb (79 kg)

Career information
- High school: De La Salle (LA)
- College: LSU
- NFL draft: 1988: 4th round, 97th overall pick

Career history
- New England Patriots (1988–1991); Indianapolis Colts (1991); New Orleans Saints (1993)*
- * Offseason or practice squad member only

Career NFL statistics
- Receptions: 26
- Receiving yards: 424
- Total touchdowns: 2
- Stats at Pro Football Reference

Samson Joseph Martin (born August 21, 1965) is an American former professional football player who last played with the Indianapolis Colts in the National Football League (NFL) in 1991. He played wide receiver professionally. His one career touchdown as a wide receiver came on a 19-yard pass from Steve Grogan on October 28, 1990. His best season came in 1989 when he caught 13 passes for 229 yards. He also contributed on punt and kickoff returns.

The 5 ft 11 in (1.80 m), 175 lb (79 kg) running back from Louisiana State University was selected by the New England Patriots with the 97th pick in the fourth round of the 1988 NFL draft.
