= Bob Bleier =

American football player (born 1964)

No. 10
- Position: Quarterback

Personal information
- Born: June 1, 1964 (age 62); Rochester, New York, U.S.
- Listed height: 6 ft 3 in (1.91 m)
- Listed weight: 210 lb (95 kg)

Career information
- High school: Aquinas Institute (Rochester)
- College: Richmond
- NFL draft: 1987: undrafted

Career history
- New England Patriots (1987)

Career NFL statistics
- Passing attempts: 39
- Passing completions: 14
- Completion percentage: 35.9%
- TD–INT: 1–1
- Passing yards: 181
- Passer rating: 49.2
- Stats at Pro Football Reference

John Robert Bleier (born June 1, 1964) is an American former professional football player who was a quarterback for the New England Patriots of the National Football League (NFL). He played college football for the Richmond Spiders.
