= Rico Corsetti =

American football player (born 1963)

No. 93
- Position: Linebacker

Personal information
- Born: January 13, 1963 (age 63); Newton, Massachusetts, U.S.
- Listed height: 6 ft 1 in (1.85 m)
- Listed weight: 225 lb (102 kg)

Career information
- High school: Belmont Hill
- College: Bates
- NFL draft: 1987: undrafted

Career history
- Miami Dolphins (1987)*; New England Patriots (1987)
- * Offseason or practice squad member only
- Stats at Pro Football Reference

Enrico S. Corsetti (born January 13, 1963) is an American former professional football linebacker who played for the New England Patriots in the National Football League (NFL). He played college football at Bates College.
