= Darren Twombly =

American football player (born 1965)

No. 64
- Position: Center

Personal information
- Born: May 14, 1965 (age 61)
- Listed height: 6 ft 4 in (1.93 m)
- Listed weight: 270 lb (122 kg)

Career information
- High school: Manchester (Manchester-by-the-Sea, Massachusetts)
- College: Boston College (1983–1986)
- NFL draft: 1987: undrafted

Career history
- New England Patriots (1987); Green Bay Packers (1988)*
- * Offseason or practice squad member only

Career NFL statistics
- Games played: 1
- Stats at Pro Football Reference

Darren William Twombly (born May 14, 1965) is an American former professional football player who was a center for the New England Patriots of the National Football League (NFL). He played college football for the Boston College Eagles.
