= Thomas Benson (American football) =

American football player (born 1961)

No. 53, 57, 54
- Position: Linebacker

Personal information
- Born: September 6, 1961 (age 65); Ardmore, Oklahoma, U.S.
- Listed height: 6 ft 2 in (1.88 m)
- Listed weight: 238 lb (108 kg)

Career information
- High school: Ardmore
- College: Oklahoma
- NFL draft: 1984: 2nd round, 36th overall pick

Career history
- Atlanta Falcons (1984–1985); San Diego Chargers (1986–1987); New England Patriots (1988); Los Angeles Raiders (1989–1992)

Career NFL statistics
- Sacks: 12.5
- Interceptions: 3
- Fumble recoveries: 7
- Stats at Pro Football Reference

Thomas Carl Benson (born June 9, 1961) is an American former professional football player who was a linebacker in the National Football League (NFL). He played college football for the Oklahoma Sooners football before being selected by the Atlanta Falcons in the second round of the 1984 NFL draft. He played nine seasons in the NFL for four teams.
