= Larry Linne =

American football player and businessman (born 1962)

No. 80
- Position: Wide receiver

Personal information
- Born: July 20, 1962 (age 64); Baltimore, Maryland, U.S.
- Listed height: 6 ft 1 in (1.85 m)
- Listed weight: 185 lb (84 kg)

Career information
- High school: Midland Lee (TX)
- College: Texas; UTEP
- NFL draft: 1986: undrafted

Career history
- New England Patriots (1986–1987); Dallas Cowboys (1987)*; San Diego Chargers (1988)*
- * Offseason or practice squad member only

Career NFL statistics
- Receptions: 11
- Receiving yards: 158
- Touchdowns: 2
- Stats at Pro Football Reference

Larry Glen Linne (born July 20, 1962) is an American former professional football player and businessman. He was a replacement player who was a wide receiver for the New England Patriots of the National Football League (NFL). In his three professional games, he scored two touchdowns. Linne also spent time on the practice squads of the San Diego Chargers and Dallas Cowboys. He has been the CEO for multiple companies.
