= Joe McHale =

American football player (born 1963)

No. 55
- Position: Linebacker

Personal information
- Born: September 26, 1963 (age 63); Passaic, New Jersey, U.S.
- Listed height: 6 ft 2 in (1.88 m)
- Listed weight: 227 lb (103 kg)

Career information
- High school: Morris Catholic (Denville Township, New Jersey)
- College: Delaware
- NFL draft: 1986: undrafted

Career history
- Washington Redskins (1986)*; New York Jets (1987)*; New England Patriots (1987)
- * Offseason or practice squad member only

Career NFL statistics
- Games played: 3
- Stats at Pro Football Reference

Joseph T. McHale (born September 26, 1963) is an American former professional football player who was a linebacker for one season in the National Football League (NFL). After playing college football for the Delaware Fightin' Blue Hens, he signed with the New York Jets as an undrafted free agent in 1987. He was waived before the season by the Jets, and signed by the New England Patriots shortly thereafter. He played in three games for the Patriots in 1987.

Born in Passaic, New Jersey, and raised in Denville Township, New Jersey, McHale played prep football at Morris Catholic High School.
