= Tom Rehder =

American football player (born 1965)

No. 76, 64, 74
- Position: Offensive lineman

Personal information
- Born: January 27, 1965 (age 61); Sacramento, California, U.S.
- Listed height: 6 ft 7 in (2.01 m)
- Listed weight: 280 lb (127 kg)

Career information
- High school: St. Joseph (Santa Maria, California)
- College: Notre Dame (1983–1987)
- NFL draft: 1988: 3rd round, 69th overall pick

Career history
- New England Patriots (1988–1989); New York Jets (1990)*; New York Giants (1990); Sacramento Surge (1992); Minnesota Vikings (1992)
- * Offseason or practice squad member only

Awards and highlights
- Super Bowl champion (XXV); World Bowl champion (1992)

Career NFL statistics
- Games played: 40
- Stats at Pro Football Reference

Thomas Bernard Rehder II (born January 27, 1965) is an American former professional football player who was an offensive lineman for three seasons in the National Football League (NFL) with the New England Patriots and New York Giants. He was selected by the Patriots in the third round of the 1988 NFL draft after playing college football for the Notre Dame Fighting Irish. He was a member of the Giants team that won Super Bowl XXV.

== Early life and college ==
Thomas Bernard Rehder II was born on January 27, 1965, in Sacramento, California. He attended St. Joseph High School in Santa Maria, California.

Rehder played college football for the Fighting Irish of the University of Notre Dame from 1984 to 1987. He was redshirted in 1983. He caught 13 passes for 182 yards and one touchdown in 1985 as a tight end.

== Professional career ==
Rehder was selected by the New England Patriots in the third round, with the 69th overall pick, of the 1988 NFL draft. He officially signed with the team on July 15. He played in all 16 games for the Patriots during his rookie year in 1988. Rehder appeared in all 16 games for the second straight season in 1989. He became a free agent after the 1989 season.

Rehder signed with the New York Jets on February 26, 1990. He was waived on August 28, 1990.

Rehder was claimed off waivers by the New York Giants on August 30, 1990. He played in eight games for the Giants during the 1990 season. On January 27, 1991, the Giants won Super Bowl XXV against the Buffalo Bills by a score of 20–19. He was released by the Giants on August 26, 1991.

Rehder signed with the Sacramento Surge of the World League of American Football on April 2, 1992. He was a member of the team during the 1992 season. The Surge won World Bowl '92 against the Orlando Thunder 21–17.

Rehder signed with the Minnesota Vikings on July 23, 1992. He was released on September 9, 1992, without appearing in a game.

== Personal life ==
Rehder later started Mongo's Saloon and 3 Fat Guys Diner in Grover Beach, California. In February 2020, the City of Grover Beach named Rehder its Citizen of the Year.
