= Dwayne Sabb =

American football player (born 1969)

No. 95, 56
- Positions: Linebacker, fullback

Personal information
- Born: October 9, 1969 (age 57); Jersey City, New Jersey, U.S.
- Listed height: 6 ft 4 in (1.93 m)
- Listed weight: 248 lb (112 kg)

Career information
- High school: Hudson Catholic Regional (Jersey City, New Jersey)
- College: New Hampshire
- NFL draft: 1992: 5th round, 116th overall pick

Career history
- New England Patriots (1992–1996); Saint Louis Rams (1997)*; Buffalo Bills (1998)*; New York/New Jersey Hitmen (2001); New Jersey Gladiators (2001–2002); Buffalo Destroyers (2003); Philadelphia Soul (2004)
- * Offseason or practice squad member only

Career NFL statistics
- Tackles: 111
- Sacks: 7
- Interceptions: 3
- Forced fumbles: 3
- Stats at Pro Football Reference

Career AFL statistics
- Tackles: 19
- Sacks: 6.5
- Touchdowns: 1
- Stats at ArenaFan.com

Dwayne Irving Sabb (born October 9, 1969) is an American former professional football player who was a linebacker and fullback in the National Football League (NFL), the XFL and the Arena Football League (AFL). He played college football for the New Hampshire Wildcats.

== Early life ==
Sabb was born October 10, 1969, in Jersey City, New Jersey. Sabb graduated from Hudson Catholic Regional High School in Jersey City, New Jersey, before attending the University of New Hampshire.

== Career ==
After graduating from UNH, he was selected in the 5th round (116th overall) in the 1992 NFL draft by the New England Patriots. A member of the Patriots from 1992 to 1996, Sabb appeared in Super Bowl XXXI, a Patriots loss to the Green Bay Packers. Following Sabb's NFL career, he played in various other leagues including the XFL (2001 with New York/New Jersey Hitmen) and the Arena Football League. With the Hitmen, Sabb was amongst the XFL leaders in sacks. In the AFL, Sabb spent 2001–02 with the New Jersey Gladiators, 2003 with the Buffalo Destroyers and 2004 -2005 with the expansion Philadelphia Soul.
