= Walter Scott (American football) =

American football player (born 1973)

No. 94, 74, 75
- Position: Defensive lineman

Personal information
- Born: May 18, 1973 (age 53); Augusta, Georgia, U.S.
- Listed height: 6 ft 3 in (1.91 m)
- Listed weight: 285 lb (129 kg)

Career information
- High school: Strom Thurmond (Johnston, South Carolina)
- College: East Carolina (1991–1995)
- NFL draft: 1996: undrafted

Career history
- Green Bay Packers (1996)*; New England Patriots (1996); Green Bay Packers (1996)*; Rhein Fire (1998–1999); Miami Dolphins (1999)
- * Offseason or practice squad member only

Awards and highlights
- Super Bowl champion (XXXI); World Bowl champion (1998)
- Stats at Pro Football Reference

Walter Bernard Scott (born May 18, 1973) is an American former professional football defensive lineman who played for the New England Patriots of the National Football League (NFL). He played college football for the East Carolina Pirates.

== Early life ==
Walter Bernard Scott was born on May 18, 1973, in Augusta, Georgia. He played piano as a child and entered several competitions. He played high school football at Strom Thurmond High School in Johnston, South Carolina.

== College career ==
Scott enrolled at East Carolina University to play college football for the Pirates. He was a letterman in 1991, 1992, 1994, and 1995. He redshirted the 1993 season. Scott was a musician during college. In 1994, he said his goal was to own a studio and perform music professionally.

== Professional career ==
After going undrafted in the 1996 NFL draft, Scott signed with the Green Bay Packers on April 26, 1996. On August 25, Scott and Mike Bartrum were traded to the New England Patriots as considerations for a prior trade. Scott played in one regular season game for the Patriots before being released on November 5, 1996.

On November 18, 1996, Scott was signed to the Packers' practice squad, where he spent the remainder of the season. On January 26, 1997, the Packers won Super Bowl XXXI against the Patriots by a score of 35–21. He became a free agent after the season and signed a futures contract with Green Bay on January 30. Scott was released on August 25, 1997.

Scott played for the Rhein Fire of NFL Europe in 1998, posting four tackles on defense. On June 14, 1998, the Fire won World Bowl '98 against the Frankfurt Galaxy 34–10. He returned to the Fire in 1999, recording ten defensive tackles, one special teams tackle, and one forced fumble.

Scott signed with the Miami Dolphins on July 14, 1999. He was placed on injured reserve on September 5, 1999, where he spent the entire 1999 season. His contract expired on February 11, 2000.
