= Marvin Allen (running back) =

American football player (born 1965)

Profile
- Title: Assistant general manager

Personal information
- Born: November 23, 1965 (age 60); Wichita Falls, Texas, U.S.
- Listed height: 5 ft 10 in (1.78 m)
- Listed weight: 215 lb (98 kg)

Career information
- Position: Running back (No. 39)
- High school: Hirschi (Wichita Falls)
- College: Tulane
- NFL draft: 1988: 11th round, 294th overall pick

Career history

Playing
- New England Patriots (1988–1991)

Operations
- New England Patriots (1993–2008) Area scout; Atlanta Falcons (2009–2012) Area scout; Kansas City Chiefs (2013–2016) Director of college scouting; Buffalo Bills (2017–2018) National scout; Miami Dolphins (2019–2025) Assistant general manager

Awards and highlights
- As an executive: 3× Super Bowl champion (XXXVI, XXXVIII, XXXIX)

Career NFL statistics
- Rushing yards: 378
- Rushing average: 4
- Touchdowns: 2
- Stats at Pro Football Reference

Marvin Allen (born November 23, 1965) is an American former professional football player and executive who most recently served as the assistant General Manager for the Miami Dolphins of the National Football League (NFL). Before his executive career, he played running back and was selected by the Patriots in the 11th round of the 1988 NFL draft, a team he would play four seasons for.

After retiring from playing, Allen worked in the New England Patriots' personnel department from 1993 through 2008. In 2009, he left New England for the Atlanta Falcons, working there through the 2013 NFL season. From 2013 through 2016, he was the Kansas City Chief's Director of College Scouting. In 2017, he was a National Scout for the Buffalo Bills before being hired as the Dolphin's new assistant general manager in 2019.

Allen was fired from the Miami Dolphins on January 13, 2026. Allen served under ex-general manager Chris Grier for his entire tenure with the team. He was with the team through the entire “Tank for Tua” era, from stripping the team of assets in 2019, to drafting Tua Tagovailoa in 2020, hiring McDaniel in 2022, and approval of awarding Tua Tagovailoa a $212.4 million extension.
