= Al Herline =

American football player (born 1964)

No. 6
- Position: Punter

Personal information
- Born: September 16, 1964 (age 62); Monroe, Louisiana, U.S.
- Listed height: 6 ft 0 in (1.83 m)
- Listed weight: 168 lb (76 kg)

Career information
- High school: Marist (Brookhaven, Georgia)
- College: Vanderbilt
- NFL draft: 1987: undrafted

Career history
- New England Patriots (1987); Tampa Bay Buccaneers (1988)*
- * Offseason or practice squad member only

Career NFL statistics
- Punts: 25
- Punt yards: 861
- Longest punt: 50
- Stats at Pro Football Reference

Alan Joseph Herline (born September 16, 1964) is an American former professional football player who was a punter for the New England Patriots of the National Football League (NFL). He played college football for the Vanderbilt Commodores.
