= Joe Peterson (American football) =

American football player (born 1964)

No. 45
- Position: Cornerback

Personal information
- Born: August 15, 1964 (age 62); San Francisco, California, U.S.
- Listed height: 5 ft 10 in (1.78 m)
- Listed weight: 185 lb (84 kg)

Career information
- High school: Sacred Heart (San Francisco)
- College: Nevada (1983–1986)
- NFL draft: 1987: undrafted

Career history
- New England Patriots (1987)

Career NFL statistics
- Interceptions: 1
- Fumble recoveries: 1
- Stats at Pro Football Reference

Joseph Peterson (born August 15, 1964) is an American former professional football player who was a cornerback for the New England Patriots of the National Football League (NFL). He played college football for the Nevada Wolf Pack.
