= Bruce Hansen (American football) =

American football player (1961–2015)

No. 24
- Position: Fullback

Personal information
- Born: September 18, 1961; American Fork, Utah, U.S.
- Died: October 18, 2015 (aged 54); Utah, U.S.
- Listed height: 6 ft 1 in (1.85 m)
- Listed weight: 225 lb (102 kg)

Career information
- High school: American Fork
- College: BYU (1980–1981, 1985—1986)
- NFL draft: 1987: undrafted

Career history
- New England Patriots (1987)

Career NFL statistics
- Rushing yards: 44
- Rushing average: 2.8
- Receptions: 1
- Receiving yards: 22
- Stats at Pro Football Reference

Bruce Bennett Hansen (September 18, 1961 – October 18, 2015) was an American professional football player who was a fullback for one season with the New England Patriots of the National Football League (NFL). He played college football for the BYU Cougars.

== Early life ==
Bruce Bennett Hansen was born on September 18, 1961, in American Fork, Utah and attended American Fork High School. He earned 11 varsity letters in high school from his participation in football, basketball, baseball, and track. He garnered all-state recognition in football and also in baseball as a pitcher. Hansen earned all-region honors in football and basketball as well.

== College career ==
Bennett first played for the BYU Cougars football team from 1980 to 1981. He rushed 14 times for 64 yards and one touchdown in 1980. He recorded 35 carries for 176 yards and one touchdown, and 14 receptions for 106 yards in 1981. He then served a Mormon mission in Mississippi for the LDS Church before returning to BYU in 1985. In 1985, he rushed 15 times for 64 yards and caught four passes for 52 yards and a touchdown. Bennett totaled 71 rushing attempts for 406 yards and two touchdowns and 19 catches for 203 yards and three touchdowns as a senior in 1986. He majored in broadcasting and film production at BYU.

== Professional career ==
On September 24 1987, Hansen was signed by the New England Patriots during the 1987 NFL players strike. He played in three games for the Patriots before being released on October 27 due to the strike ending. However, Hansen was later re-signed by the Patriots on November 24. He was placed on injured reserve on December 19, 1987. Overall, he played in six games, starting two, for the Patriots during the 1987 NFL season as a fullback, rushing 16 times for 44 yards, catching one pass for 22 yards, returning one kick for 14 yards, and recovering one fumble. He was released on August 22, 1988.

== Personal and later life ==
Hansen's brothers Brian and Regan were both linebackers at BYU. His brother Randy played football at the University of Utah. His son Derrick played football at the University of Montana.

He died on October 18, 2015, in Utah.
