= Gene Taylor (gridiron football) =

American gridiron football player (born 1962)

No. 85, 82, 88, 80
- Position: Wide receiver

Personal information
- Born: November 12, 1962 (age 63); Oakland, California, U.S.
- Listed height: 6 ft 2 in (1.88 m)
- Listed weight: 189 lb (86 kg)

Career information
- College: Fresno State
- NFL draft: 1987: 6th round, 163rd overall pick

Career history
- New England Patriots (1987)*; Tampa Bay Buccaneers (1987–1988); San Francisco 49ers (1989)*; Saskatchewan Roughriders (1989); Los Angeles Rams (1990)*; Barcelona Dragons (1991); New England Patriots (1991); Kansas City Chiefs (1992)*
- * Offseason or practice squad member only

Career NFL statistics
- Receptions: 7
- Receiving yards: 74
- Stats at Pro Football Reference

Gene Taylor (born November 12, 1962) is an American former professional football player who was a wide receiver in the National Football League (NFL). He was selected by the New England Patriots in the sixth round of the 1987 NFL draft. He played college football for the Fresno State Bulldogs.

== Professional career ==
=== New England Patriots ===
Taylor was selected by the New England Patriots in the sixth round (163rd overall) of the 1987 NFL draft.

=== Tampa Bay Buccaneers ===
Taylor played two season with the Tampa Bay Buccaneers (1987–88).

=== San Francisco 49ers ===
Taylor signed with the San Francisco 49ers for the 1989 season but did not play a single down.

=== Saskatchewan Roughriders ===
Taylor played for the Saskatchewan Roughriders of the Canadian Football League in 1989.

=== Los Angeles Rams ===
Taylor signed with the Los Angeles Rams in 1990. He was waived on August 16.

=== Barcelona Dragons ===
Taylor signed with the World League of American Football in 1991. He was selected by the Barcelona Dragons in the first round (second wide receiver) of the 1991 WLAF positional draft. He was one of the WLAF's top ten pass receivers.

=== New England Patriots ===
Taylor was signed by the New England Patriots on July 9, 1991. He was released on August 26. The Patriots re-signed him on November 12. He was waived on December 6.
