= Art Plunkett =

American football player (born 1959)

No. 70
- Position: Offensive tackle

Personal information
- Born: March 8, 1959 (age 67); Chicago, Illinois, U.S.
- Listed height: 6 ft 7 in (2.01 m)
- Listed weight: 269 lb (122 kg)

Career information
- High school: Arlington Heights (IL), Millcreek (UT) Skyline
- College: UNLV
- NFL draft: 1981: 8th round, 216 (by the Los Angeles Rams)th overall pick

Career history
- Los Angeles Rams (1981)*; St. Louis Cardinals (1981–1984); New England Patriots (1985, 1987)
- * Offseason or practice squad member only

Career NFL statistics
- Games played: 71
- Games started: 5
- Stats at Pro Football Reference

Art Plunkett (born March 8, 1959) is an American former professional football player who was a tackle in the National Football League (NFL). He played college football for the UNLV Rebels. Plunkett played in the NFL for the St. Louis Cardinals from 1981 to 1984 and for the New England Patriots in 1985 and 1987.
