= Bill Turner (American football) =

American football player (born 1960)

No. 74
- Position: Guard

Personal information
- Born: March 5, 1960 (age 66); Norwood, Massachusetts
- Listed height: 6 ft 4 in (1.93 m)
- Listed weight: 245 lb (111 kg)

Career information
- College: Boston College

Career history
- New England Patriots (1987)
- Stats at Pro Football Reference

William James Turner (born March 5, 1960) is an American former football guard who played for the New England Patriots of the National Football League (NFL). He played college football at Boston College.
