= Tom Gibson (American football) =

American football player (born 1963)

No. 71, 75
- Position: Defensive lineman

Personal information
- Born: December 20, 1963 (age 62); San Fernando, California, U.S.
- Listed height: 6 ft 7 in (2.01 m)
- Listed weight: 257 lb (117 kg)

Career information
- High school: Saugus (Santa Clarita, California)
- College: Northern Arizona
- NFL draft: 1987: 5th round, 116th overall pick

Career history
- New England Patriots (1987–1988); Cleveland Browns (1989–1990); Philadelphia Eagles (1991)*; Los Angeles Rams (1991); Pittsburgh Steelers (1992)*; Seattle Seahawks (1993)*; Arizona Rattlers (1994–1998)
- * Offseason or practice squad member only

Awards and highlights
- 2× ArenaBowl champion (1994, 1997)

Career NFL statistics
- Sacks: 3
- Stats at Pro Football Reference
- Stats at ArenaFan.com

Thomas Anthony Gibson (born December 20, 1963) is an American former professional football player who was a defensive lineman for three seasons in the National Football League (NFL) with the Cleveland Browns and Los Angeles Rams. He played college football for the Northern Arizona Lumberjacks and was selected by the New England Patriots in the fifth round of the 1987 NFL draft.

== Early life and college ==
Thomas Anthony Gibson was born on December 20, 1963, in San Fernando, California. He attended Saugus High School in Santa Clarita, California.

Gibson played college football for the Northern Arizona Lumberjacks of Northern Arizona University.

== Professional career ==
Gibson was selected by the New England Patriots in the fifth round, with the 116th overall pick, of the 1987 NFL draft. He officially signed with the team on July 21. He was placed on injured reserve on September 8, 1987, and spent the entire season there. Gibson was placed on injured reserve again the following year on August 29, 1988, and missed the entire season once again. He became a free agent after the 1988 season.

Gibson signed with the Cleveland Browns on March 17, 1989. He played in all 16 games, starting one, for the Browns in 1989 and posted two sacks. He also appeared in two playoff games that year. Gibson was placed on injured reserve on September 4, 1990, and was activated on October 3, 1990. He played in 12 games, starting three, for Cleveland in 1990 and recorded one sack. He became a free agent after the 1990 season and re-signed with the Browns in July 1991. Gibson was waived by Cleveland in August 1991.

Gibson was claimed off waivers by the Philadelphia Eagles on August 28, 1991. He was released a few days later on August 30, 1991.

Gibson signed with the Los Angeles Rams on November 13, 1991. He played in five games, starting one, for Rams. He became a free agent after the 1991 season.

Gibson was signed by the Pittsburgh Steelers on April 1, 1992, and was later released on August 31, 1992.

Gibson signed with the Seattle Seahawks on May 20, 1993. He was released on August 23, 1993.

Gibson played in 21 games for the Arizona Rattlers of the Arena Football League (AFL) from 1994 to 1998, recording 12 solo tackles, 11 assisted tackles, one sack, one forced fumble, three fumble recoveries, six pass breakups, and three receptions for 13 yards. He was an offensive lineman/defensive lineman during his time in the AFL as the league played under ironman rules. He won ArenaBowl VIII in 1994 and ArenaBowl XI in 1997.
