= Teddy Garcia =

American football player (born 1964)

No. 7, 2, 8, 3
- Position: Placekicker

Personal information
- Born: June 4, 1964 (age 62); Caddo Parish, Louisiana, U.S.
- Listed height: 5 ft 10 in (1.78 m)
- Listed weight: 187 lb (85 kg)

Career information
- High school: Lewisville (Lewisville, Texas)
- College: Northeast Louisiana
- NFL draft: 1988: 4th round, 100th overall pick

Career history
- New England Patriots (1988); Phoenix Cardinals (1989)*; Minnesota Vikings (1989); Seattle Seahawks (1990)*; Houston Oilers (1990); San Antonio Riders (1991); Barcelona Dragons (1992); New Orleans Night (1992); Shreveport Knights (1999)
- * Offseason or practice squad member only

Career NFL statistics
- Field goals made: 21
- Field goal attempts: 38
- Field goal %: 55.3
- Longest field goal: 50
- Stats at Pro Football Reference
- Stats at ArenaFan.com

Alfonso Teddy Garcia (born June 4, 1964) is an American former professional football player who was a placekicker in the National Football League (NFL) and the World League of American Football (WLAF).

== Career ==
Garcia played college football at Northeast Louisiana University (now the University of Louisiana at Monroe), where he was a member of the team that won the 1987 NCAA Division I-AA Football Championship Game. He was selected by the New England Patriots in the fourth round of the 1988 NFL draft.

Between 1988 and 1992, Garcia played for the New England Patriots, Minnesota Vikings, and Houston Oilers of the NFL, and the San Antonio Riders and Barcelona Dragons of the WLAF. In 1999, Garcia played for the Shreveport Knights of the short-lived Regional Football League (RFL).
