= Rick Sanford =

American football player (born 1957)

No. 25
- Positions: Cornerback, safety

Personal information
- Born: January 9, 1957 (age 69); Rock Hill, South Carolina, U.S.
- Listed height: 6 ft 1 in (1.85 m)
- Listed weight: 192 lb (87 kg)

Career information
- High school: Northwestern (Rock Hill)
- College: South Carolina
- NFL draft: 1979: 1st round, 25th overall pick

Career history
- New England Patriots (1979–1984); Seattle Seahawks (1985)

Career NFL statistics
- Interceptions: 16
- Fumble recoveries: 9
- Touchdowns: 3
- Stats at Pro Football Reference

Richard Sanford (born January 9, 1957) is an American former professional football player who was a defensive back in the National Football League (NFL) for the New England Patriots, and Seattle Seahawks.

After retiring from the NFL, he was a Doctor of Chiropractic for 25 years as well as a sports talk radio host.
