= Tom Porell =

American football player and coach (born 1964)

No. 65
- Position: Nose tackle

Personal information
- Born: September 23, 1964 (age 62); Cambridge, Massachusetts, U.S.
- Listed height: 6 ft 3 in (1.91 m)
- Listed weight: 275 lb (125 kg)

Career information
- High school: Winchester (Winchester, Massachusetts)
- College: Boston College
- NFL draft: 1987: undrafted

Career history

Playing
- Atlanta Falcons (1987)*; New England Patriots (1987); Green Bay Packers (1988)*
- * Offseason or practice squad member only

Coaching
- Providence College (1988) Defensive coordinator; Winchester High School (1990–1991) Line coach; Lawrence Academy (2006–2010) Defensive line coach
- Stats at Pro Football Reference

Thomas Reardon Porell (born September 23, 1964) is an American former professional football nose tackle who played in one game for the New England Patriots of the National Football League (NFL) in 1987. Porell also was with the Atlanta Falcons and Green Bay Packers, but did not play with them. Porell later became defensive coordinator at Providence College and is now a youth football coach.

He currently works at a Senior Vice President at USI Insurance Services in Boston.
