= Jon Sawyer =

American football player (born 1964)

No. 31
- Position: Defensive back

Personal information
- Born: April 6, 1964 (age 62)
- Listed height: 5 ft 9 in (1.75 m)
- Listed weight: 175 lb (79 kg)

Career information
- High school: Hialeah
- College: Cincinnati
- NFL draft: 1987: undrafted

Career history
- New England Patriots (1987)
- Stats at Pro Football Reference

Jonathan LaJuan Sawyer (born April 6, 1964) is an American former professional football player who was a defensive back for the New England Patriots of the National Football League (NFL). He played college football for the Cincinnati Bearcats.
