= Ed Reynolds (linebacker) =

American football player and executive (born 1961)

No. 95
- Position: Linebacker

Personal information
- Born: September 23, 1961 (age 65); Stuttgart, West Germany
- Listed height: 6 ft 5 in (1.96 m)
- Listed weight: 238 lb (108 kg)

Career information
- High school: Drewry Mason (Ridgeway, Virginia)
- College: Virginia
- NFL draft: 1983: undrafted

Career history
- New England Patriots (1983–1991); New York Giants (1992)

Career NFL statistics
- Sacks: 4
- Fumble recoveries: 4
- Stats at Pro Football Reference

Edward Rannell Reynolds (born September 23, 1961) is a former National Football League (NFL) league office executive and American football linebacker who played in the NFL for the New England Patriots and New York Giants between 1983 and 1992.

== Early life and education ==
He played college football at the University of Virginia. Reynolds also served as an operations and training officer in the U.S. Army Reserve.

== Career ==
In 1983, Reynolds joined the New England Patriots as a free agent. During the 1989 season, Reynolds was the leading tackler for the New England Patriots.

In August 2010, Reynolds was named president of Norfolk, Virginia's new United Football League (UFL) franchise, replacing Jim Speros.

In June 2012, Reynolds was named athletic director at Hickory Grove Christian School responsible for overseeing all middle school, junior varsity and varsity sports programs.
