= Darryl Holmes =

American football player (born 1968)

No. 41, 20
- Position: Safety

Personal information
- Born: September 6, 1964 (age 62); Birmingham, Alabama, U.S.
- Listed height: 6 ft 2 in (1.88 m)
- Listed weight: 190 lb (86 kg)

Career information
- High school: Northside (Warner Robins, Georgia)
- College: Fort Valley State
- NFL draft: 1987: undrafted

Career history
- New England Patriots (1987–1989); Pittsburgh Steelers (1990)*; Montreal Machine (1991–1992); Philadelphia Eagles (1992)*
- * Offseason or practice squad member only
- Stats at Pro Football Reference

Darryl DeWayne Holmes (born September 6, 1964) is an American former professional football safety who played for the New England Patriots of the National Football League (NFL). He played college football and basketball for the Fort Valley State Wildcats.

== Early life ==
Darryl DeWayne Holmes was born on September 6, 1964, in Birmingham, Alabama. He attended Northside High School in Warner Robins, Georgia, graduating in 1982.

== College career ==
In 1982, Holmes accepted an athletic scholarship to attend Fort Valley State College and play college basketball for the Wildcats. He played college football for the Wildcats from 1983 to 1986 as a cornerback, earning all-conference honors three times. He was inducted into Fort Valley State's athletics hall of fame in 2016.

== Professional career ==
After going undrafted in the 1987 NFL draft, Holmes signed with the New England Patriots on May 12, 1987, as a safety. He led the team in solo tackles during the 1987 preseason with 18. He also had six assisted tackles, one interception, and one pass breakup. Holmes was released on September 7 but re-signed the next day. He was released again two years later on September 5, 1989, and re-signed again on September 30, 1989. Overall, Holmes played in 44 games, starting three, for the Patriots from 1987 to 1989, recording one interception for four yards, one forced fumble, and two fumble recoveries.

Holmes became a free agent after the 1989 season, and signed with the Pittsburgh Steelers on March 31, 1990. He was released on September 4, 1990.

Holmes started all ten games for the Montreal Machine of the World League of American Football (WLAF) in 1991, posting 59 tackles, one interception, and nine pass breakups as the Machine went 4–6. He also played for Montreal in 1992 and made two interceptions for 28 yards.

Holmes signed with the Philadelphia Eagles on June 4, 1992. On August 26, 1992, it was reported that he had been waived.

== Personal life ==
Holmes was a commissioned officer in the United States Army Signal Corps for six years. He coached football at Georgia Military College.
