= Eric Schubert =

American football player (born 1962)

No. 3, 11, 1
- Position: Placekicker

Personal information
- Born: May 28, 1962 (age 64); Abington Township, Pennsylvania, U.S.
- Listed height: 5 ft 8 in (1.73 m)
- Listed weight: 185 lb (84 kg)

Career information
- High school: Wanaque (NJ) Lakeland Regional
- College: Pittsburgh
- NFL draft: 1984: undrafted

Career history
- Pittsburgh Maulers (1984); New England Patriots (1985); New York Giants (1985); St. Louis Cardinals (1986); New England Patriots (1987)
- Stats at Pro Football Reference

Eric Schubert (born May 28, 1962) is an American former professional football player who was a placekicker in the National Football League (NFL). He played college football for the Pittsburgh Panthers. Schubert started off with the Pittsburgh Maulers in 1984. He then played for the New York Giants in 1985, the St. Louis Cardinals in 1986 and for the New England Patriots in 1987.

Raised in Ringwood, New Jersey, Schubert played both baseball and football at Lakeland Regional High School.

== Career ==
Schubert appeared with the Giants when they required a kicker nine weeks into the 1985 season. In his first game as a kicker, he went 5-for-5 with an extra point kicked to lead the team in scoring while the Giants triumphed over the Tampa Bay Buccaneers 22-20. In eight games that year, he would go 10-of-13 on field goals while making 26 of 27 extra points. In the playoffs, he was not as effective. In the Wild Card game against San Francisco, he went 1-for-4 on field goals while making both extra points in the 17-3 victory. In the Divisional Round game, he missed on his one field goal attempt in the 21-0 drubbing that the Chicago Bears delivered to them.

He was let go by the Giants after the season. The St. Louis Cardinals signed him to kick for the last five games of the 1986 season. He went 3-of-11 on field goals (which included three misses in a 10-10 tie against Philadelphia) while making all nine extra points. He was signed to kick for New England for their Week 4 game against the Cleveland Browns the following season, and he went 1-of-2 on field goals with an extra point in the 20-10 loss.
