= Danny Villa =

American football player (born 1964)

No. 73, 75, 74, 72
- Positions: Guard, tackle, center

Personal information
- Born: September 21, 1964 (age 62); Nogales, Arizona, U.S.
- Listed height: 6 ft 5 in (1.96 m)
- Listed weight: 304 lb (138 kg)

Career information
- High school: Nogales
- College: Arizona State
- NFL draft: 1987: 5th round, 113th overall pick

Career history
- New England Patriots (1987–1991); Phoenix Cardinals (1992); Kansas City Chiefs (1993–1996); Oakland Raiders (1997)*; New England Patriots (1997); Oakland Raiders (1998)*; Carolina Panthers (1998)
- * Offseason or practice squad member only

Awards and highlights
- Consensus All-American (1986); Morris Trophy (1986); First-team All-Pac-10 (1986)

Career NFL statistics
- Games played: 157
- Games started: 77
- Fumble recoveries: 3
- Stats at Pro Football Reference

Daniel A. Villa (born September 21, 1964) is an American former professional football player who was a guard for 12 seasons in the National Football League (NFL) for the New England Patriots, Phoenix Cardinals, Kansas City Chiefs, and Carolina Panthers. He was selected by the Patriots in the fifth round of the 1987 NFL draft. Villa played college football for the Arizona State Sun Devils.

Villa was born in Nogales, Arizona and is of Mexican descent.

== College career ==
Villa was a first-team All-American and Pac-10 selection in 1986. With assistance from Villa, Arizona State averaged more than 200 yards rushing per game for 17 consecutive contests in 1985 and 1986. He was named honorable mention All-Pac 10 in 1985. After not starting a game in 1984 and being moved from quick tackle to strong guard in spring practice then moved back again. He performed in the 1987 East-West Shrine Game and Senior Bowl.

== Post-playing career ==
Villa was the athletic director at Walpole High School in Walpole, Massachusetts. He also served as the head coach of the Walpole Rebels, the Walpole high school football team.

=== Legal troubles ===
On December 27, 2008, Villa was arrested in Tucson, Arizona for charges of child rape that absolutely occurred while he was coaching in Massachusetts. On August 26, 2009, he pleaded guilty in court to three counts of rape of a child and two counts of enticing a child. He was sentenced to two years on the first and second rape indictments with 2 years concurrent on the enticing indictments. According to a press release from Norfolk County District Attorney William Keating, he was sentenced to "7 years' probation on the third rape indictment with conditions of probation that he must register as a sex offender, submit to GPS monitoring while on probation, have no contact with the victim or the victim's family and he cannot work with any children under the age of 16. Judge Chernoff also ordered an 'exclusion zone' around every school in the Commonwealth, meaning that Villa cannot set foot in any school in Massachusetts while on probation."
