= Milford Hodge =

American football player (born 1961)

No. 98, 97, 65
- Positions: Defensive end, nose tackle

Personal information
- Born: March 11, 1961 (age 65); Los Angeles, California, U.S.
- Listed height: 6 ft 3 in (1.91 m)
- Listed weight: 278 lb (126 kg)

Career information
- High school: South San Francisco (South San Francisco, California)
- College: Washington State (1981–1984)
- NFL draft: 1985: 8th round, 224th overall pick

Career history
- New England Patriots (1985–1986); New Orleans Saints (1986); New England Patriots (1986–1989); Washington Redskins (1990)*; San Francisco 49ers (1991)*; London Monarchs (1992)
- * Offseason or practice squad member only

Career NFL statistics
- Sacks: 3
- Fumble recoveries: 1
- Stats at Pro Football Reference

Milford Hodge (born March 11, 1961) is an American former professional football player who was a defensive lineman for four seasons in the National Football League (NFL) with the New England Patriots and New Orleans Saints. He was selected by the Patriots in the eighth round of the 1985 NFL draft. He played college football for the Washington State Cougars. Hodge also played for the London Monarchs of the World League of American Football (WLAF).

== Early life ==
Milford Hodge was born on March 11, 1961, in Los Angeles, California. He attended South San Francisco High School in South San Francisco, California. He earned all-league and all-county honors as a defensive tackle his senior year. He also played center and forward on the basketball team and was a two-year starter, averaging 11 points per game as a junior and 18 points as a senior.

== College career ==
Hodge played college football for the Cougars of Washington State University, spending time at both nose guard and tackle. He played sparingly during his freshman year in 1980 and was redshirted in 1981. He started four games in 1982, recording season totals of 18 solo tackles, 27 assisted tackles, 3.5 sacks, and one forced fumble. Hodge started five game in 1983, totaling three sacks on the year. As a senior in 1984, he recorded 36 solo tackles, 33 assisted tackles, and six sacks, garnering honorable mention All-Pac-10 recognition.

== Professional career ==
Hodge was selected by the New England Patriots in the 8th round, with the 224th overall pick, of the 1985 NFL draft. He officially signed with the team on July 19. He was released on August 28, 1985. Hodge was signed by the Patriots again on February 24, 1986. He was placed on injured reserve on August 18 and later released on September 30, 1986.

Hodge signed with the New Orleans Saints on October 10, 1986, and played in one game before being released on October 14, 1986.

He re-signed with the Patriots on November 14, 1986. He then played in six games for the Patriots that year, recording one sack. Hodge also appeared in one playoff game that year. He was released on September 7, 1987, and re-signed the next day. He appeared in 12 games during the 1987 season, missing three games due to the 1987 NFL players strike, and made one sack. He became a free agent after the season and re-signed with the Patriots on April 26, 1988. Hodge played in 15 games, starting seven, in 1988, totaling one sack and one fumble recovery. He appeared in all 16 games, starting one, in 1989 and returned two kicks for 19 yards. He became a free agent again after the 1989 season.

Hodge was signed by the Washington Redskins on March 15, 1990. He was released on September 3, 1990.

Hodge signed with the San Francisco 49ers on May 3, 1991. He was released on August 20, 1991.

Hodge played for the London Monarchs of the World League of American Football in 1992 and recorded one interception.
