= Tim Jordan (American football) =

American football player (born 1964)

No. 93
- Position: Linebacker

Personal information
- Born: April 26, 1964 (age 62); Madison, Wisconsin, U.S.
- Listed height: 6 ft 3 in (1.91 m)
- Listed weight: 226 lb (103 kg)

Career information
- High school: La Follette (Madison)
- College: Wisconsin
- NFL draft: 1987: 4th round, 107th overall pick

Career history
- New England Patriots (1987–1989)

Awards and highlights
- Second-team All-Big Ten (1985)

Career NFL statistics
- Sacks: 3
- Interceptions: 1
- Fumble recoveries: 3
- Stats at Pro Football Reference

Tim Jordan (born April 26, 1964) is an American former professional football player who was a linebacker in the National Football League (NFL). He played college football for the Wisconsin Badgers. He was selected by the New England Patriots in the fourth round of the 1987 NFL draft and played three seasons with the team.

Jordan graduated from La Follette High School in Madison, Wisconsin, and attended the University of Wisconsin–Madison, playing for the Badgers under coach Dave McClain.

Jordan and his teammate Rick Graf, also a Madison native, were known as "Thunder and Lightning." The two hometown teammates also had the nickname "the Madison City Maulers." His six-sack game against Northwestern in 1985 tied Darryl Sims for the best single-game sack performance by a Badgers player. He finished the 1985 season with 11 sacks and finished his career with 27 total sacks, the 4th best mark in Wisconsin history.

He played in 30 games in his NFL career, starting 10.
