= Willie Scott (American football) =

American football player (1959–2021)

No. 81, 88
- Position: Tight end

Personal information
- Born: February 13, 1959; Newberry, South Carolina, U.S.
- Died: February 8, 2021 (aged 61)
- Listed height: 6 ft 4 in (1.93 m)
- Listed weight: 245 lb (111 kg)

Career information
- High school: Newberry
- College: South Carolina
- NFL draft: 1981: 1st round, 14th overall pick

Career history
- Kansas City Chiefs (1981–1985); New England Patriots (1986–1988)

Career NFL statistics
- Receptions: 89
- Receiving yards: 766
- Touchdowns: 15
- Stats at Pro Football Reference

Willie Louis Scott (February 13, 1959 – February 8, 2021) was an American professional football player who was a tight end in the National Football League (NFL). Scott was the son of Gloria and Willie Scott. Gloria and Willie were employed at Newberry High School. Gloria was a math teacher and Willie was an assistant principal. Scott attended Newberry High School in Newberry, South Carolina. Scott graduated from the University of South Carolina in 1981 and was drafted 14th overall in the first round and went on to play with the Kansas City Chiefs from 1981 to 1985 and also the New England Patriots from 1986 to 1988.

He was a leader of the NAACP for his region. He was also a football coach at Brookland-Cayce High School. He died February 8, 2021, five days short of his 62nd birthday.
