= Ron Shegog =

American football player (born 1963)

No. 42
- Position: Safety

Personal information
- Born: March 2, 1963 (age 63); Batesville, Mississippi, U.S.
- Listed height: 6 ft 0 in (1.83 m)
- Listed weight: 185 lb (84 kg)

Career information
- High school: South Panola (Batesville)
- College: Austin Peay
- NFL draft: 1986: undrafted

Career history
- New England Patriots (1986–1987); Denver Dynamite (1989)
- Stats at Pro Football Reference

Ronald L. Shegog (born March 3, 1963) is an American former professional football player who was a safety for the New England Patriots of the National Football League (NFL). He played college football for the Austin Peay Governors.
