= Elgin Davis =

American football player (born 1965)

No. 40
- Position: Running back

Personal information
- Born: October 23, 1965 (age 61); Jacksonville, Florida, U.S.
- Listed height: 5 ft 10 in (1.78 m)
- Listed weight: 192 lb (87 kg)

Career information
- High school: Jean Ribault (Jacksonville)
- College: UCF
- NFL draft: 1987: 12th round, 330th overall pick

Career history
- New England Patriots (1987–1988); Pittsburgh Steelers (1989)*
- * Offseason or practice squad member only

Career NFL statistics
- Rushing yards: 43
- Rushing average: 4.8
- Return yards: 240
- Stats at Pro Football Reference

Elgin J. Davis (born October 23, 1965) is an American former professional football player who was a running back for the New England Patriots in the National Football League (NFL). He played college football for the UCF Knights.

Davis was selected 330th overall by the New England Patriots in the 12th round of the 1987 NFL draft, becoming the second player ever drafted out of the University of Central Florida. Davis played two seasons with the Patriots before signing with the Pittsburgh Steelers and later the Winnipeg Blue Bombers of the Canadian Football League (CFL).
