= Todd Sandham =

American football player (born 1963)

No. 72
- Position: Guard

Personal information
- Born: December 3, 1963 (age 62); Plantsville, Connecticut, U.S.
- Listed height: 6 ft 3 in (1.91 m)
- Listed weight: 255 lb (116 kg)

Career information
- High school: Southington
- College: Northeastern
- NFL draft: 1987: undrafted

Career history
- New England Patriots (1987)
- Stats at Pro Football Reference

Todd M. Sandham (born December 3, 1963) is an American former professional football player who was a guard for the New England Patriots of the National Football League (NFL). He played college football for the Northeastern Huskies.

Sandham attended Southington High School. He was a replacement player during the 1987 NFL strike.
