= Ed Williams (linebacker) =

American football player (born 1961)

No. 54
- Position: Linebacker

Personal information
- Born: September 8, 1961 (age 65); Odessa, Texas, U.S.
- Listed height: 6 ft 4 in (1.93 m)
- Listed weight: 244 lb (111 kg)

Career information
- High school: Permian (Odessa}
- College: Texas
- NFL draft: 1984: 2nd round, 43rd overall pick

Career history
- New England Patriots (1984–1990)

Career NFL statistics
- Sacks: 2
- Fumble recoveries: 4
- Interceptions: 1
- Stats at Pro Football Reference

Edward Eugene Williams (born September 8, 1961) is an American former professional football player who played seven seasons as a linebacker for the New England Patriots in the National Football League (NFL), including Super Bowl XX. Prior to that, he played college football as a defensive end for the Texas Longhorns.

== College career ==
Ed Williams played college football at Texas, helping them to win Southwest Conference Championships in 1981 and 1983. In 1981, the Longhorns won the Cotton Bowl and finished ranked #2. In 1983 he had a game-ending safety against then-undefeated SMU that allowed Texas to retain its #2 ranking.

== Professional career ==
Williams was selected in the second round of the 1984 NFL draft by the New England Patriots with the 43rd pick overall. He was one of 17 Longhorns taken in the draft, breaking the record for most players drafted by a single school in one draft. He'd also been drafted by the San Antonio Gunslingers of the USFL, but never chose to play in that league.

The Patriots moved him to right, outside linebacker and he played in most of the Patriots games, including Super Bowl XX, which the Patriots lost, through his first 3 seasons, but was not a starter until 1987. He suffered a series of small injuries to his ankle and groin during that time. 1987 was his best season, starting in 7 games and recording his only interception, which he returned for 51 yards.

He was resigned by the Patriots in 1988 and a month later suffered a serious knee injury and spent the 1988 season on the injured reserve. He was signed to a new one-year contract before the 1989 season, but he did not play that season. Before the 1990 season he was waived by the Patriots and then reclaimed the next day. He played in 15 games and was the starter 3 times that season, but continued to deal with an ankle injury.
