= Ernest Gibson (American football) =

American football player (born 1961)

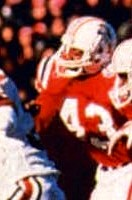
- Gibson with the New England Patriots in 1984

No. 43, 42
- Position: Cornerback

Personal information
- Born: October 3, 1961 (age 65); Jacksonville, Florida, U.S.
- Listed height: 5 ft 10 in (1.78 m)
- Listed weight: 189 lb (86 kg)

Career information
- High school: Bishop Kenny (Jacksonville)
- College: Furman
- NFL draft: 1984: 6th round, 151st overall pick

Career history
- New England Patriots (1984–1988); Miami Dolphins (1989); New England Patriots (1990)

Career NFL statistics
- Interceptions: 4
- INT yards: 21
- Fumble recoveries: 1
- Stats at Pro Football Reference

Ernest Gerard Gibson (born October 3, 1961) is an American former professional football player. He played as a cornerback in the National Football League (NFL) for six seasons, with the New England Patriots from 1984 to 1988 and the Miami Dolphins in 1989. Gibson played college football at Furman University.

== Professional career ==
Gibson was selected by the New England Patriots in the sixth round of the 1984 NFL draft playing for them from 1984 to 1988. He was a member of the Super Bowl XX Patriots squad. Gibson played for the Miami Dolphins in his last NFL season in 1989.

== Personal life ==
Gibson currently resides in East Cobb, Georgia, and is a business consultant for Chick-fil-A in the Atlanta area.
