= Dennis Gadbois =

American football player (born 1963)

No. 82, 48
- Position: Wide receiver

Personal information
- Born: September 18, 1963 (age 63); Biddeford, Maine, U.S.
- Listed height: 6 ft 1 in (1.85 m)
- Listed weight: 183 lb (83 kg)

Career information
- High school: Biddeford
- College: Boston University
- NFL draft: 1987: undrafted

Career history
- New England Patriots (1987–1988)

Career NFL statistics
- Receptions: 3
- Receiving yards: 51
- Stats at Pro Football Reference

Dennis Gadbois (born September 18, 1963) is an American former professional football player who was a wide receiver for the New England Patriots of the National Football League (NFL) from 1987 to 1988. He played college football for the Boston University Terriers.
