= Steve Moore (American football) =

American football player (1960–1989)

No. 67
- Position: Offensive tackle

Personal information
- Born: October 1, 1960; Memphis, Tennessee, U.S.
- Died: October 25, 1989 (aged 29); Memphis, Tennessee, U.S.
- Listed height: 6 ft 4 in (1.93 m)
- Listed weight: 293 lb (133 kg)

Career information
- College: Tennessee State
- NFL draft: 1983: 3rd round, 80th overall pick

Career history
- New England Patriots (1983–1988)

Career NFL statistics
- Games: 52
- Games started: 31
- Stats at Pro Football Reference

Stephen Elliott Moore (October 1, 1960 – October 25, 1989) was an American professional football offensive tackle who played five seasons with the New England Patriots in the National Football League (NFL). Moore attended Tennessee State University.

Moore was shot and killed in October 1989, following a robbery outside a convenience store in Memphis.
