= Lin Dawson =

American football player (born 1959)

No. 87
- Position: Tight end

Personal information
- Born: June 24, 1959 (age 67); Norfolk, Virginia, U.S.
- Listed height: 6 ft 3 in (1.91 m)
- Listed weight: 240 lb (109 kg)

Career information
- High school: Kinston (Kinston, North Carolina)
- College: NC State
- NFL draft: 1981: 8th round, 212th overall pick

Career history
- New England Patriots (1981–1990); Detroit Lions (1991)*
- * Offseason or practice squad member only

Awards and highlights
- New England Patriots All-1980s Team

Career NFL statistics
- Receptions: 117
- Receiving yards: 1,233
- Receiving touchdowns: 8
- Stats at Pro Football Reference

James Linwood Dawson, legally changed to Lin Dawson in 1993 (born June 24, 1959), is an American former professional football player who was a tight end for the New England Patriots of the National Football League (NFL). He serves as the managing director of The Lin Dawson Organization, LLC.

Lin grew up in Kinston, North Carolina. After graduating from Kinston High School in 1977, he accepted a football scholarship from NC State University. In the 1981 NFL draft, he was selected by the New England Patriots in the eighth round with the 212th overall pick. He played ten years with the Patriots. A starter at tight end, Dawson suffered torn ligaments in his knee on the Patriots’ first offensive play from scrimmage in Super Bowl XX on an incomplete pass thrown to him by quarterback Tony Eason, causing him to miss not only the rest of the Super Bowl but the entire following 1986 season. He was a member of the New England Patriots ‘Team of the Decade-1980's.

During the 1987 NFL players strike, Dawson was the player representative for the New England Patriots.
