= 1985–86 NFL playoffs =

American football tournament

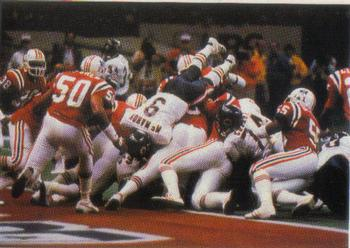
- The Chicago Bears making a rushing play in the end zone against the New England Patriots during Super Bowl XX
- Dates: December 28, 1985–January 26, 1986
- Season: 1985
- Teams: 10
- Games played: 9
- Super Bowl XX site: Louisiana Superdome; New Orleans, Louisiana
- Defending champions: San Francisco 49ers
- Champion: Chicago Bears (9th title)
- Runner-up: New England Patriots
- Conference runners-up: Los Angeles Rams; Miami Dolphins
NFL playoffs
← 1984–85	1986–87 →

The National Football League playoffs for the 1985 season began on December 28, 1985. The postseason tournament concluded with the Chicago Bears defeating the New England Patriots in Super Bowl XX, 46–10, on January 26, 1986, at the Louisiana Superdome in New Orleans, Louisiana.

== Participants ==
Within each conference, the three division winners and the two non-division winners with the best overall regular season records qualified for the playoffs. The NFL did not use a fixed-bracket playoff system. The three division winners were seeded 1–3 based on their overall won-lost-tied record, and received a first-round bye while the wild card teams were seeded 4 and 5, and played in the first round, dubbed the wild-card playoffs or wild-card weekend, with the 4 seed hosting. The second round, the divisional playoffs, had a restriction where two teams from the same division could not meet: the surviving wild card team visited the division champion outside its division that had the higher seed, and the remaining two teams from that conference played each other. The two surviving teams from each conference's divisional playoff games then met in the respective AFC and NFC Conference Championship games, hosted by the higher seed. Finally the Super Bowl, the championship round of the playoffs, was played at a neutral site, with the designated home team based on an annual rotation by conference.

Playoff seeds
Seed	AFC	NFC
1	Los Angeles Raiders (West winner)	Chicago Bears (Central winner)
2	Miami Dolphins (East winner)	Los Angeles Rams (West winner)
3	Cleveland Browns (Central winner)	Dallas Cowboys (East winner)
4	New York Jets (wild card)	New York Giants (wild card)
5	New England Patriots (wild card)	San Francisco 49ers (wild card)

== Bracket ==
Jan 4 – Anaheim Stadium
3	Dallas	0
Dec 29 – Giants Stadium	Jan 12 – Soldier Field
2	LA Rams	20
NFC
5	San Francisco	3	2	LA Rams	0
Jan 5 – Soldier Field
4	NY Giants	17	1	Chicago	24
NFC Championship
4	NY Giants	0
Jan 26 – Louisiana Superdome
1	Chicago	21
Divisional playoffs
Wild Card playoffs	N1	Chicago	46
Jan 5 – Los Angeles Memorial Coliseum
A5	New England	10
Super Bowl XX
5	New England	27
Dec 28 – Giants Stadium	Jan 12 – Miami Orange Bowl
1	LA Raiders	20
AFC
5	New England	26	5	New England	31
Jan 4 – Miami Orange Bowl
4	NY Jets	14	2	Miami	14
AFC Championship
3	Cleveland	21
2	Miami	24

== Schedule ==
Because the Jets and Giants both used Giants Stadium as their home field, the two wild card playoff games were held on different days.

In the United States, CBS televised the NFC playoff games, while NBC broadcast the AFC games and Super Bowl XX.

Round	Away team	Score	Home team	Date	Kickoff (ET / UTC−5)	TV
Wild-card round	New England Patriots	26–14	New York Jets	December 28, 1985	4:00 p.m.	NBC
Wild-card round	San Francisco 49ers	3–17	New York Giants	December 29, 1985	1:00 p.m.	CBS
Divisional round	Cleveland Browns	21–24	Miami Dolphins	January 4, 1986	12:30 p.m.	NBC
Divisional round	Dallas Cowboys	0–20	Los Angeles Rams	January 4, 1986	4:00 p.m.	CBS
Divisional round	New York Giants	0–21	Chicago Bears	January 5, 1986	12:30 p.m.	CBS
Divisional round	New England Patriots	27–20	Los Angeles Raiders	January 5, 1986	4:00 p.m.	NBC
Conference championships	Los Angeles Rams	0–24	Chicago Bears	January 12, 1986	12:30 p.m.	CBS
Conference championships	New England Patriots	31–14	Miami Dolphins	January 12, 1986	4:00 p.m.	NBC
Super Bowl XX Louisiana Superdome New Orleans, Louisiana	Chicago Bears	46–10	New England Patriots	January 26, 1986	5:20 p.m.	NBC

== Wild-card round ==
=== Saturday, December 28, 1985 ===
==== AFC: New England Patriots 26, New York Jets 14 ====
New England Patriots vs. New York Jets – Game summary

Quarter	1	2	3	4	Total
Patriots	3	10	10	3	26
Jets	0	7	7	0	14

at Giants Stadium, East Rutherford, New Jersey

- Game time: 4:00 p.m. EST
- Game weather: 31 °F (−1 °C), mostly cloudy
- Game attendance: 75,945
- Referee: Jerry Seeman
- TV announcers (NBC): Marv Albert (play-by-play) and Bob Griese (color commentator)

Game information

First quarter

- NE – Tony Franklin 33-yard field goal. Patriots 3–0.

Second quarter

- NYJ – Johnny Hector 11-yard pass from Ken O'Brien (Pat Leahy kick). Jets 7–3.
- NE – Tony Franklin 41-yard field goal. Jets 7–6.
- NE – Stanley Morgan 36-yard pass from Tony Eason (Tony Franklin kick). Patriots 13–7.

Third quarter

- NE – Tony Franklin 20-yard field goal. Patriots 16–7.
- NE – Johnny Rembert 15-yard fumble return (Tony Franklin kick). Patriots 23–7.
- NYJ – Mickey Shuler 12-yard pass from Pat Ryan (Pat Leahy kick). Patriots 23–14.

Fourth quarter

- NE – Tony Franklin 26-yard field goal. Patriots 26–14.

Top passers

- NE – Tony Eason – 12/16, 179 yards, TD
- NYJ – Ken O'Brien – 13/17, 149 yards, TD, INT

Top rushers

- NE – Craig James – 22 rushes, 49 yards
- NYJ – Freeman McNeil – 16 rushes, 41 yards

Top receivers

- NE – Stanley Morgan – 3 receptions, 61 yards, TD
- NYJ – Al Toon – 9 receptions, 93 yards

This was the first postseason meeting between the Patriots and Jets. In the NFL's first playoff game at Giants Stadium, the Patriots dominated the game by forcing five sacks and four turnovers from a Jets offense that had ranked #1 during the season for fewest turnovers lost (29). This was New England's first playoff win since 1963.

New England jumped to 3–0 lead in the first quarter after Tony Franklin made a 33-yard field goal. Then after New York scored on quarterback Ken O'Brien's 11-yard touchdown pass to running back Johnny Hector, Franklin kicked his second field goal from 41 yards. Late in the second quarter, safety Fred Marion intercepted a pass from O'Brien and returned it 26 yards to the Jets 33-yard line. A few plays later, Jets defensive back Russell Carter failed to make contact with receiver Stanley Morgan while trying to jam him at the line of scrimmage, enabling Morgan to take off past Carter and haul in a 36-yard touchdown completion from Tony Eason, giving New England a 13–7 halftime lead.

In the third quarter, Franklin made a 20-yard field goal to give the Patriots a 16–7 lead and on the ensuing kickoff, Hector was stripped of the ball by linebacker Johnny Rembert, who then picked up the fumble and returned it 15 yards for a touchdown, which gave the Patriots a commanding 23–7 lead. However, Hector returned the next kickoff 33 yards to the Pats 43-yard line. From there, Pat Ryan replaced O'Brien, who had been suffering from a concussion since the first half, and completed 5/7 passes on a 57-yard scoring drive, the last a 12-yard touchdown throw to tight end Mickey Shuler, making the score 23–14. But in the fourth quarter, Patriots linebacker Andre Tippett deflected a Ryan pass into the arms of defensive end Garin Veris, who returned the interception 18 yards to set up Franklin's fourth field goal and finish off the scoring.

Veris finished the game with three sacks and an interception. Eason completed 12 of 17 passes for 179 yards and a touchdown. Hector returned six kickoffs for 115 yards and added 24 more yards rushing and receiving. Jets receiver Al Toon set a franchise playoff record for receptions (9), good for 93 yards.

=== Sunday, December 29, 1985 ===
==== NFC: New York Giants 17, San Francisco 49ers 3 ====
San Francisco 49ers vs. New York Giants – Game summary

Quarter	1	2	3	4	Total
49ers	0	3	0	0	3
Giants	3	7	7	0	17

at Giants Stadium, East Rutherford, New Jersey

- Game time: 1:00 p.m. EST
- Game weather: 36 °F (2 °C), mostly cloudy
- Game attendance: 75,131
- Referee: Red Cashion
- TV announcers (CBS): Pat Summerall (play-by-play) and John Madden (color commentator)

Game information

First quarter

- NYG – Eric Schubert 47-yard field goal. Giants 3–0.

Second quarter

- NYG – Mark Bavaro 18-yard pass from Phil Simms (Eric Schubert kick). Giants 10–0.
- SF – Ray Wersching 21-yard field goal. Giants 10–3.

Third quarter

- NYG – Don Hasselbeck 3-yard pass from Phil Simms (Eric Schubert kick). Giants 17–3.

Fourth quarter

- No scoring plays.

Top passers

- SF – Joe Montana – 26/47, 296 yards, INT
- NYG – Phil Simms – 15/31, 181 yards, 2 TD, INT

Top rushers

- SF – Wendell Tyler – 10 rushes, 61 yards
- NYG – Joe Morris – 28 rushes, 141 yards

Top receivers

- SF – Dwight Clark – 8 receptions, 120 yards
- NYG – Mark Bavaro – 5 receptions, 67 yards, TD

In the Giants first home playoff game since 1962, despite the fact that the 49ers recorded 362 yards of total offense, with receiver Dwight Clark catching eight passes for 120 yards, the Giants defense limited San Francisco to only one field goal the entire game. It was a very satisfying win for New York, who had lost their last five games played against the 49ers, including playoff losses in 1981 and 1984. Meanwhile, the 49ers dropped nine passes and finished without a touchdown for the first time in their last 40 games.

The Giants scored on their opening possession of the game with kicker Eric Schubert's 47-yard field goal. Then in the second quarter, New York safety Terry Kinard intercepted a pass from 49ers quarterback Joe Montana and returned it 15 yards to set up Phil Simms' 18-yard touchdown pass to tight end Mark Bavaro. San Francisco managed to drive inside the Giants 10-yard line with a 15-play drive that included two personal fouls and a holding call against New York's defense. However, they could not get into the end zone and had to settle for Ray Wersching's 21-yard field goal, cutting the score to 10-3 going into halftime.

A 77-yard drive in the third quarter was capped by Simms' 3-yard touchdown pass to tight end Don Hasselbeck, increasing New York's lead to 17–3. In the fourth quarter, the Giants made two key defensive stands to keep the game out of range. First, they forced San Francisco to turn the ball over on downs at the New York 26 with 4:46 left. Following a New York punt, the 49ers drove into the Giants red zone. With 2:16 left in the game, Montana threw a touchdown pass to tight end John Frank, but it was eliminated by a holding penalty against guard John Ayers. On the next play, he threw a pass to running back Carl Monroe, only to have him drop it in the end zone. Then on fourth and 15, Montana's final pass was incomplete and New York ran out the rest of the clock.

New York running back Joe Morris finished the game with 141 rushing yards. Defensive lineman Jim Burt had two of New York's four sacks. 49ers running back Roger Craig, who became the first player in NFL history to gain over 1,000 rushing and receiving yards during the regular season, was held to just 24 rushing yards and 18 receiving yards.

This was the third postseason meeting between the 49ers and Giants. San Francisco won both previous meetings.

Previous playoff games
San Francisco leads 2–0 in all-time playoff games

1981

New York Giants 24 @ San Francisco 49ers 38

1981 NFC Divisional playoffs

1984

New York Giants 10 @ San Francisco 49ers 21

1984 NFC Divisional playoffs

== Divisional round ==
=== Saturday, January 4, 1986 ===
==== AFC: Miami Dolphins 24, Cleveland Browns 21 ====
Cleveland Browns vs. Miami Dolphins – Game summary

Quarter	1	2	3	4	Total
Browns	7	7	7	0	21
Dolphins	3	0	14	7	24

at Miami Orange Bowl, Miami, Florida

- Game time: 12:30 p.m. EST
- Game weather: 77 °F (25 °C), mostly cloudy
- Game attendance: 75,128
- Referee: Pat Haggerty
- TV announcers (NBC): Don Criqui (play-by-play) and Bob Trumpy (color commentator)

Game information

First quarter

- MIA – Fuad Reveiz 51-yard field goal. Dolphins 3–0.
- CLE – Ozzie Newsome 16-yard pass from Bernie Kosar (Matt Bahr kick). Browns 7–3.

Second quarter

- CLE – Earnest Byner 21-yard run (Matt Bahr kick). Browns 14–3.

Third quarter

- CLE – Earnest Byner 66-yard run (Matt Bahr kick). Browns 21–3.
- MIA – Nat Moore 6-yard pass from Dan Marino (Fuad Reveiz kick). Browns 21–10.
- MIA – Ron Davenport 31-yard run (Fuad Reveiz kick). Browns 21–17.

Fourth quarter

- MIA – Ron Davenport 1-yard run (Fuad Reveiz kick). Dolphins 24–21.

Top passers

- CLE – Bernie Kosar – 10/19, 66 yards, TD, INT
- MIA – Dan Marino – 25/45, 238 yards, TD, INT

Top rushers

- CLE – Earnest Byner – 16 rushes, 161 yards, 2 TD
- MIA – Ron Davenport – 8 rushes, 48 yards, 2 TD

Top receivers

- CLE – Ozzie Newsome – 2 receptions, 22 yards, TD
- MIA – Tony Nathan – 10 receptions, 101 yards

Barely making the playoffs with an 8–8 record, Cleveland hardly seemed a match for the 12–4 defending AFC champion Dolphins. However, the Browns jumped to a 21–3 lead midway through the third quarter, but the Dolphins then scored 21 unanswered points—the final touchdown with 1:57 left to play.

Aided by a 17-yard run from Woody Bennett on the first play of the game, Miami scored on their opening drive with a 51-yard field goal by Fuad Reveiz. Cleveland later marched 82 yards in 10 plays, mainly on the strength of their ground game, with Kevin Mack rushing for 12, Curtis Dickey picking up 9, and Earnest Byner's 15-yard carry taking them into the red zone. Bernie Kosar eventually finished the drive with a 16-yard touchdown pass to tight end Ozzie Newsome to give the Browns a 7–3 lead.

In the second quarter, Miami got two big chances to score, but came up empty both times. First, they threatened to score with a drive to a first down on the Cleveland 36-yard line. But the Browns defense stepped up, forcing two incompletions and a run for no gain, and the Dolphins decided to punt rather than risk another long field goal. On the Browns next drive, Paul Lankford intercepted Kosar and returned the ball to the Cleveland 25-yard line. Miami then drove to the 6-yard line, only to lose the ball when Marino was picked off in the end zone by Browns safety Don Rogers, who returned it 45 yards to set up a 21-yard rushing touchdown from Byner, increasing the lead to 14–3. Miami responded with a drive to the Browns 29-yard line, but Reveiz missed a 47-yard field goal attempt as time expired in the half.

Byner ran for a 66-yard touchdown with 11:03 left in the third quarter, the longest play in Cleveland's postseason history, to give Cleveland a 21–3 lead. However, Miami then controlled the rest of the game. A 13-play 74-yard drive, aided by a 15-yard late hit penalty against Cleveland and a 15-yard reception by Mark Clayton, was capped by Marino's 6-yard touchdown pass to Nat Moore. Miami's defense quickly forced a punt, and Jeff Gossett's kick went just 26 yards to the Browns 49-yard line. From there it took just five plays to score on a 31-yard burst by Ron Davenport, who trucked right through Rogers and linebacker Clarence Weathers on the way to the end zone. Browns receiver Glen Young gave his team a chance to get their momentum back with a 35-yard kickoff return to the 42-yard line. But after a holding penalty wiped out a first down run, Cleveland could not recover and had to punt.

In the fourth quarter, Marino got the team rolling on a 74-yard, 10-play drive for the game winning score, connecting with halfback Tony Nathan for a 39-yard gain (the longest reception of the day from either team) to the Browns 35-yard line, and later finding tight end Bruce Hardy for 18 yards inside the Cleveland red zone. On the first play after the two-minute warning, Davenport went into the end zone on a 1-yard score with 1:57 left to give the Dolphins the lead, 24–21. Cleveland then took the ball and tried to drive for the tying field goal, but on the game's last play, Byner was tackled on the Miami 45-yard line as time expired.

Byner finished the game with 161 rushing yards and two touchdowns on just 16 carries, while also catching four passes for 25 yards. Nathan rushed for 21 yards and caught 10 passes for 101 yards. Marino was 25/45 for 238 yards with a touchdown and an interception. Cleveland racked up a whopping 251 rushing yards against the Dolphins defense, which turned out to be an omen of what lay in store for them in the AFC Championship Game.

This was the second postseason meeting between the Browns and Dolphins. Miami won the only previous meeting.

Previous playoff games
Miami leads 1–0 in all-time playoff games

1972

Cleveland Browns 14 @ Miami Dolphins 20

1972 AFC Divisional playoffs

==== NFC: Los Angeles Rams 20, Dallas Cowboys 0 ====
Dallas Cowboys vs. Los Angeles Rams – Game summary

Quarter	1	2	3	4	Total
Cowboys	0	0	0	0	0
Rams	3	0	10	7	20

at Anaheim Stadium, Anaheim, California

- Game time: 4:00 p.m. EST/1:00 p.m. PST
- Game weather: 67 °F (19 °C), fog, drizzle
- Game attendance: 66,581
- Referee: Dick Jorgensen
- TV announcers (CBS): Jack Buck (play-by-play), Hank Stram, and Dick Vermeil (color commentators)

Game information

First quarter

- RAMS – Mike Lansford 33-yard field goal. Rams 3–0.

Second quarter

- No scoring plays.

Third quarter

- RAMS – Eric Dickerson 55-yard run (Mike Lansford kick). Rams 10–0.
- RAMS – Mike Lansford 34-yard field goal. Rams 13–0.

Fourth quarter

- RAMS – Eric Dickerson 40-yard run (Mike Lansford kick). Rams 20–0.

Top passers

- DAL – Danny White – 24/43, 217 yards, 3 INT
- RAMS – Dieter Brock – 6/22, 50 yards, INT

Top rushers

- DAL – Tony Dorsett – 17 rushes, 58 yards
- RAMS – Eric Dickerson – 34 rushes, 248 yards, 2 TD

Top receivers

- DAL – Tony Dorsett – 8 receptions, 80 yards
- RAMS – Henry Ellard – 2 receptions, 33 yards

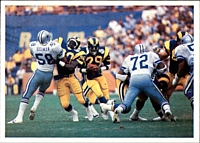
Rams' running back Dickerson (29) rushing the ball through the Cowboys' defense in the NFC Divisional Playoff game.

Running back Eric Dickerson led the Rams to a victory by scoring two touchdowns and recording a playoff record 248 rushing yards, while LA's defense held the Cowboys to 243 yards and forced six turnovers.

Rams receiver Henry Ellard's 23-yard punt return to the Dallas 38-yard line and 21-yard reception on the next play set up the first score of the game, a 33-yard field goal by Mike Lansford 5:19 into the first quarter. This ended up being the only score of the first half, while Ellard's 21-yard catch ended up being nearly half of the Rams total passing yards (47) for the entire game.

LA running back Charles White returned the second half kickoff (a squib kick by punter Mike Saxon, who had replaced injured kicker Rafael Septién) 14 yards to the Rams 45-yard line. Dickerson scored on a 55-yard touchdown run on the next play, giving the Rams a 10–0 lead. On the ensuing kickoff, Kenny Duckett fumbled, and the ball was recovered by Vince Newsome on the Dallas 18 to set up Lansford's second field goal. In the fourth quarter, Dallas managed to reach the Rams 20-yard line, but Kevin Greene sacked Cowboys quarterback Danny White on third down. Now on 4th and 14 from the Rams 24 and without their injured kicker, the Cowboys seemed unsure of what to do. First they sent their field goal unit in, with linebacker Brian Salonen, who played kicker in college, lined up to make the kick. This caused the Rams to sense a potential fake try, so they kept their regular defense on the field. Then Dallas called a timeout and sent their regular offense back to try and convert the fourth down, which failed as White's pass was batted away. The Cowboys defense subsequently forced a punt, but Gordon Banks muffed the kick and Rams cornerback Jerry Gray recovered the ball to set up Dickerson's 40-yard rushing touchdown.

This was Tom Landry's final postseason game as the Cowboys head coach, and also the final NFL playoff game at Anaheim Stadium. The Rams would not host another NFL postseason game until 1999, the team's fifth season following their 1995 relocation to St. Louis. The Rams would not host another playoff game as the Los Angeles Rams until 2017. It would be their record breaking eighth playoff meeting between the two teams and the last one until the 2018 season. Rams defensive end Gary Jeter finished the game with three sacks, while Gray had a fumble recovery and an interception. The Rams won despite a dismal day for their 34-year old rookie quarterback Dieter Brock, who completed just 6 of 22 passes for 50 yards and was intercepted once.

"It seemed like we just gave up," said Dallas future hall of fame running back Tony Dorsett, who was held to just 58 rushing yards, though he did catch 8 passes for 80. "We should have gone back to Dallas and gave them the ball game at halftime." "As far as playoff games go, I don't think we've ever been dominated like we were today," added White, who was sacked five times and threw three interceptions.

This was the eighth postseason meeting between the Cowboys and Rams. Dallas had won four of the previous seven meetings.

Previous playoff games
Dallas leads 4–3 in all-time playoff games

1973

Los Angeles Rams 16 @ Dallas Cowboys 27

1973 NFC Divisional playoffs

1975

Dallas Cowboys 37 @ Los Angeles Rams 7

1975 NFC Championship Game

1976

Los Angeles Rams 14 @ Dallas Cowboys 12

1976 NFC Divisional playoffs

1978

Dallas Cowboys 28 @ Los Angeles Rams 0

1978 NFC Championship Game

1979

Los Angeles Rams 21 @ Dallas Cowboys 19

1979 NFC Divisional playoffs

1980

Los Angeles Rams 13 @ Dallas Cowboys 34

1980 NFC Wild Card playoffs

1983

Los Angeles Rams 24 @ Dallas Cowboys 17

1983 NFC Wild Card playoffs

=== Sunday, January 5, 1986 ===
==== NFC: Chicago Bears 21, New York Giants 0 ====
New York Giants vs. Chicago Bears – Game summary

Quarter	1	2	3	4	Total
Giants	0	0	0	0	0
Bears	7	0	14	0	21

at Soldier Field, Chicago, Illinois

- Game time: 12:30 p.m. EST/11:30 a.m. CST
- Game weather: 19 °F (−7 °C), sunny, breezy
- Game attendance: 65,670
- Referee: Ben Dreith
- TV announcers (CBS): Pat Summerall (play-by-play) and John Madden (color commentator)

Game information

First quarter

- CHI – Shaun Gayle 5-yard punt return (Kevin Butler kick). Bears 7–0.

Second quarter

- No scoring plays.

Third quarter

- CHI – Dennis McKinnon 23-yard pass from Jim McMahon (Kevin Butler kick). Bears 14–0.
- CHI – Dennis McKinnon 20-yard pass from Jim McMahon (Kevin Butler kick). Bears 21–0.

Fourth quarter

- No scoring plays.

Top passers

- NYG – Phil Simms – 14/35, 209 yards
- CHI – Jim McMahon – 11/21, 216 yards, 2 TD

Top rushers

- NYG – Joe Morris – 12 rushes, 32 yards
- CHI – Walter Payton – 27 rushes, 93 yards

Top receivers

- NYG – George Adams – 3 receptions, 65 yards
- CHI – Willie Gault – 3 receptions, 68 yards

The Bears defense dominated the game by allowing only 32 rushing yards, 181 total yards, and sacking the Giants quarterbacks for 60 yards. Giants quarterback Phil Simms was sacked six times during the game, 3.5 of them coming from Chicago defensive end Richard Dent. New York's offense passed for just 104 yards in the first half, and had 89 total yards in the third quarter.

Chicago's first touchdown resulted on a New York punt attempt from their own 12, forcing Sean Landeta to attempt the kick three yards behind his goal line. As Landeta dropped the ball to kick it, the wind altered the ball's descent and caused it to go off the side of his foot. As a result, the ball went right into the ground and bounced a short distance before reserve safety Shaun Gayle picked it up and returned the -7 yard punt five yards for a touchdown. Gayle's run was the shortest punt return touchdown in NFL history.

New York had their best chance to score late in the second quarter when Simms completed passes to George Adams and Bobby Johnson for gains of 31 and 17 yards, giving the team a first down on the Chicago 2-yard line. But Simms' next three passes were incomplete, and with just 11 seconds left in the half, kicker Eric Schubert hit the left upright on his 19-yard field goal attempt.

In the third quarter, Bears quarterback Jim McMahon increased the Bears lead to 14–0 with a 23-yard touchdown pass to receiver Dennis McKinnon. Later in the quarter, with Chicago facing second and 12 on their own 34, the Giants made another key error. The Giants defense came out of the huddle planning for a massive blitz, but decided to switch to a zone defense after reading the Bears formation. However, half the defenders were unable to hear the new play call over the roaring crowd at Soldier Field and ended up blitzing, leaving receiver Tim Wrightman completely uncovered. McMahon threw the ball to Wrightman for a 46-yard gain, and then finished the drive with a 20-yard touchdown pass to McKinnon on the next play, making the final score of the game 21–0. The Bears could have had a much larger lead, but the normally reliable rookie kicker Kevin Butler had an uncharacteristically bad day, missing three field goal attempts from distances of 26, 49 and 38 yards.

McMahon finished the game with 216 passing yards, while running back Walter Payton rushed for 94 yards and caught a 4-yard pass.

This was the seventh postseason meeting between the Giants and Bears. Chicago won four of the previous six meetings.

Previous playoff games
Chicago leads 4–2 in all-time playoff games

1933

New York Giants 21 @ Chicago Bears 23

1933 NFL Championship Game

1934

Chicago Bears 13 @ New York Giants 30

1934 NFL Championship Game

1941

New York Giants 9 @ Chicago Bears 37

1941 NFL Championship Game

1946

Chicago Bears 24 @ New York Giants 14

1946 NFL Championship Game

1956

Chicago Bears 7 @ New York Giants 47

1956 NFL Championship Game

1963

New York Giants 10 @ Chicago Bears 14

1963 NFL Championship Game

==== AFC: New England Patriots 27, Los Angeles Raiders 20 ====
New England Patriots vs. Los Angeles Raiders – Game summary

Quarter	1	2	3	4	Total
Patriots	7	10	10	0	27
Raiders	3	17	0	0	20

at Los Angeles Memorial Coliseum, Los Angeles, California

- Game time: 4:00 p.m. EST/1:00 p.m. PST
- Game weather: 62 °F (17 °C), fog
- Game attendance: 88,936
- Referee: Jerry Markbreit
- TV announcers (NBC): Dick Enberg (play-by-play) and Merlin Olsen (color commentator)

Game information

First quarter

- NE – Lin Dawson 13-yard pass from Tony Eason (Tony Franklin kick). Patriots 7–0.
- RAI – Chris Bahr 29-yard field goal. Patriots 7–3.

Second quarter

- RAI – Jessie Hester 16-yard pass from Marc Wilson (Chris Bahr kick). Raiders 10–7.
- RAI – Marcus Allen 11-yard run (Chris Bahr kick). Raiders 17–7.
- NE – Craig James 2-yard run (Tony Franklin kick). Raiders 17–14.
- NE – Tony Franklin 45-yard field goal. Tied 17–17.
- RAI – Chris Bahr 32-yard field goal. Raiders 20–17.

Third quarter

- NE – Tony Franklin 32-yard field goal. Tied 20–20.
- NE – Jim Bowman recovered fumble in end zone (Tony Franklin kick). Patriots 27–20.

Fourth quarter

- No scoring plays.

Top passers

- NE – Tony Eason – 7/14, 117 yards, TD
- RAI – Marc Wilson – 11/27, 135 yards, TD, 3 INT

Top rushers

- NE – Craig James – 23 rushes, 104 yards, TD
- RAI – Marcus Allen – 22 rushes, 121 yards, TD

Top receivers

- NE – Craig James – 3 receptions, 48 yards
- RAI – Todd Christensen – 4 receptions, 78 yards

LA had defeated New England 35–20 during the regular season, but in this game, Patriots running back Craig James rushed for 104 yards, caught three passes for 48 yards, completed one pass for eight yards, and scored a touchdown while the Patriots defense forced six turnovers and shut out the Raiders in the second half.

In the first quarter, Patriots safety Jim Bowman recovered a muffed punt by returner Fulton Walker to set up Tony Eason's 13-yard touchdown pass to tight end Lin Dawson. On LA's next drive, Ronnie Lippett intercepted a pass from Marc Wilson, but the Patriots were unable to move the ball. Then Raiders defensive end Greg Townsend blocked Rich Camarillo's punt, getting the ball back for his team at the Pats 16-yard line and leading to a 29-yard field goal by Chris Bahr.

In the second quarter, Bahr missed a 44-yard field goal, but their defense once again held the Patriots down and forced a punt, which Walker returned 16 yards to start off a 52-yard scoring drive culminating in Wilson's 16-yard touchdown throw to receiver Jessie Hester. On New England's first play from scrimmage after the turnover, Raiders lineman Howie Long recovered Mosi Tatupu's fumble on the New England 19, and LA scored another touchdown on Marcus Allen's 11-yard run, increasing their lead to 17–7. The Patriots stormed back with an 80-yard touchdown possession. Tatupu helped make up for his fumble with a 22-yard run, while James caught a 24-yard reception and rushed for 27 yards on the drive, including a 2-yard touchdown on third down out of shotgun formation that cut the score to 17–14. Then on LA's ensuing possession, Lippett recorded his second interception of the day, giving the Patriots the ball at LA's 28-yard line and setting up a Tony Franklin field goal to tie the game. There was just 1:40 left in the half at this point, but the Raiders still managed to retake the lead before halftime, with Allen rushing for a 17-yard gain and Wilson completing a 31-yard pass to tight end Todd Christensen on the way to a 32-yard field goal from Bahr.

Midway through the third quarter, Allen lost a fumble that led to Franklin's field goal, tying the game back up at 20. Then in what turned out to be the key play of the game, Raiders cornerback Sam Seale fumbled the ensuing kickoff, and Bowman recovered in the end zone for a touchdown to give his team a 27–20 lead. There was still a full quarter left to play, but the Raiders would get no further in the game than the New England 41-yard line. Los Angeles' three fourth quarter drives would result in a punt, an interception by Fred Marion and a turnover on downs at their own 13.

Allen finished the game with 121 rushing yards and a touchdown, along with three receptions for eight yards.

This was the last victory by a road team in an AFC divisional playoff game until 1992, when the Buffalo Bills defeated the Pittsburgh Steelers.

This was the second postseason meeting between the Patriots and Raiders. The Raiders won the only previous meeting when they were based in Oakland.

Previous playoff games
Los Angeles/ Oakland Raiders leads 1–0 in all-time playoff games

1976

New England Patriots 21 @ Oakland Raiders 24

1976 AFC Divisional playoffs

== Conference championships ==
=== Sunday, January 12, 1986 ===
==== NFC: Chicago Bears 24, Los Angeles Rams 0 ====
Los Angeles Rams vs. Chicago Bears – Game summary

Quarter	1	2	3	4	Total
Rams	0	0	0	0	0
Bears	10	0	7	7	24

at Soldier Field, Chicago, Illinois

- Game time: 12:30 p.m. EST/11:30 a.m. CST
- Game weather: 37 °F (3 °C), cloudy, snow showers
- Game attendance: 66,030
- Referee: Jim Tunney
- TV announcers (CBS): Pat Summerall (play-by-play) and John Madden (color commentator)

Game information

First quarter

- CHI – Jim McMahon 16-yard run (Kevin Butler kick). Bears 7–0.
- CHI – Kevin Butler 34-yard field goal. Bears 10–0.

Second quarter

- No scoring plays.

Third quarter

- CHI – Willie Gault 22-yard pass from Jim McMahon (Kevin Butler kick). Bears 17–0.

Fourth quarter

- CHI – Wilber Marshall 52-yard fumble return (Kevin Butler kick). Bears 24–0.

Top passers

- RAMS – Dieter Brock – 10/31, 66 yards, INT
- CHI – Jim McMahon – 16/25, 164 yards, TD

Top rushers

- RAMS – Eric Dickerson – 17 rushes, 46 yards
- CHI – Walter Payton – 18 rushes, 32 yards

Top receivers

- RAMS – Tony Hunter – 3 receptions, 29 yards
- CHI – Willie Gault – 4 receptions, 56 yards

The Bears defense dominated the game by limiting Rams running back Eric Dickerson to 46 yards, forcing him to fumble twice, and holding quarterback Dieter Brock to just 10 completions on 31 attempts for 66 yards. While Chicago's offensive numbers were hardly stellar (232 yards and 10 punts), Los Angeles only gained 130 yards of total offense and had to punt the ball 11 times.

After forcing the Rams to go three-and-out on the game's first possession, Bears quarterback Jim McMahon threw consecutive 20-yard completions to tight end Emery Moorehead and receiver Willie Gault before finishing the drive with a 16-yard touchdown run on third down and 10. Kevin Butler added a 34-yard field goal to give the Bears a 10-0 first quarter lead. With 1:04 left in the second quarter, LA had a huge opportunity to get back in the game when Dale Hatcher's punt bounced into the leg of Bears defensive back Reggie Phillips and safety Jerry Gray recovered the ball for the Rams on Chicago's 21-yard line. Dickerson rushed twice for nine yards and caught a pass for 7, but on his reception he was tackled on the 5 as time expired in the half. "We did call time out right before the half", John Robinson, the Rams' coach, insisted. "It depends on how long the ref takes to recognize that a player has called a timeout."

The Rams drove to their own 47-yard line on their first drive of the second half, but then linebacker Otis Wilson forced a fumble from Dickerson that was recovered by Mike Richardson on the Bears 48. Faced with fourth down and 6 on the Rams 35-yard line on the ensuing drive, Chicago picked up a first down with McMahon's 13-yard completion to running back Walter Payton. Then they took a 17–0 lead with McMahon's 22-yard touchdown pass to Gault on the next play. LA responded with a drive into Chicago territory, but Leslie Frazier ended it with an interception.

With 2:37 left in the fourth quarter, Dent forced Brock to fumble while sacking him, and linebacker Wilber Marshall picked up the loose ball and returned it 52 yards for a touchdown. It marked the end of a long day for Brock, having been sacked three times and taken numerous additional hits and harassment the entire game by the stifling Bears defense.

This was the second postseason meeting between the Rams and Bears. Los Angeles won the only prior meeting.

Previous playoff games
Los Angeles Rams leads 1–0 in all-time playoff games

1950

Chicago Bears 14 @ Los Angeles Rams 24

1950 NFL National Conf. playoff

==== AFC: New England Patriots 31, Miami Dolphins 14 ====
New England Patriots vs. Miami Dolphins – Game summary

Quarter	1	2	3	4	Total
Patriots	3	14	7	7	31
Dolphins	0	7	0	7	14

at Miami Orange Bowl, Miami, Florida

- Game time: 4:00 p.m. EST
- Game weather: 65 °F (18 °C), rain
- Game attendance: 75,662
- Referee: Gene Barth
- TV announcers (NBC): Dick Enberg (play-by-play), Merlin Olsen and Bob Griese (color commentators)

Game information

First quarter

- NE – Tony Franklin 23-yard field goal. Patriots 3–0.

Second quarter

- MIA – Dan Johnson 11-yard pass from Dan Marino (Fuad Reveiz kick). Dolphins 7–3.
- NE – Tony Collins 4-yard pass from Tony Eason (Tony Franklin kick). Patriots 10–7.
- NE – Derrick Ramsey 1-yard pass from Tony Eason (Tony Franklin kick). Patriots 17–7.

Third quarter

- NE – Robert Weathers 2-yard pass from Tony Eason (Tony Franklin kick). Patriots 24–7.

Fourth quarter

- MIA – Tony Nathan 10-yard pass from Dan Marino (Fuad Reveiz kick). Patriots 24–14.
- NE – Mosi Tatupu 1-yard run (Tony Franklin kick). Patriots 31–14.

Top passers

- NE – Tony Eason – 10/12, 71 yards, 3 TD
- MIA – Dan Marino – 20/48, 248 yards, 2 TD, 2 INT

Top rushers

- NE – Craig James – 22 rushes, 105 yards
- MIA – Joe Carter – 6 rushes, 56 yards

Top receivers

- NE – Stanley Morgan – 2 receptions, 30 yards
- MIA – Tony Nathan – 5 receptions, 57 yards, TD

In an upset, the Patriots racked up 255 rushing yards and converted six Dolphins turnovers into 24 points.

On Miami's first offensive play, Steve Nelson stripped the ball from running back Tony Nathan, and Patriots defensive end Garin Veris recovered it to set up Tony Franklin's 23-yard field goal. The Dolphins later scored on an 80-yard drive, with quarterback Dan Marino completing passes to Bruce Hardy for 12 yards and Mark Duper for 18 before finding tight end Dan Johnson in the end zone with an 11-yard touchdown pass. But New England responded on a 66-yard possession, featuring a 45-yard run from Robert Weathers, to score on quarterback Tony Eason's 4-yard touchdown to Tony Collins, giving the Pats a 10–7 lead. On Miami's next drive, Marino fumbled the ball and nose tackle Lester Williams recovered for New England on the Dolphins 36-yard line. Patriots running back Craig James then rushed for 23 yards on three carries and Eason completed a 12-yard pass to Stanley Morgan on the 1-yard line before throwing a 1-yard touchdown toss to tight end Derrick Ramsey, giving the Patriots a 17–7 lead. Just before halftime Miami missed the chance to cut the deficit down to three points when tight end Dan Johnson dropped a pass from Marino in the end zone on a first and 10 from the Patriots' 16. As the next two plays fell short of a first down, Miami settled for a field goal from the Patriots' 14 yard-line, but Fuad Reveiz' kick sailed wide to the right after a badly taken snap.

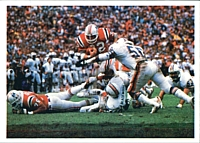
Craig James rushes the ball past the Dolphins' defense in the AFC Championship game.

Miami's Lorenzo Hampton then lost a fumble on the second half kickoff on a hit from Mosi Tatupu, and Greg Hawthorne recovered for New England on the Dolphins 25. Eason then converted the turnover into points at the end of a 6-play drive with a 2-yard touchdown pass to Weathers, making the score 24–7. The Dolphins had a chance to take the momentum back when safety Bud Brown recovered Fred Marion's fumbled punt return on the Patriots 45-yard line. But after a 19-yard run by Joe Carter and a 16-yard catch by Ron Davenport, Marion made up for his error by intercepting Marino's pass in the end zone to keep Miami from scoring. New England then put together a 13-play drive that took nearly eight minutes off the clock and moved the ball to the Dolphins 24-yard line. But Franklin missed a 41-yard field goal attempt, keeping the Dolphins' slim comeback hopes alive going into the fourth quarter.

Three plays into the final quarter, New England fumbled another punt return, this one lost by Roland James, and Miami took over on the Patriots 10-yard line. This time, they took advantage of their scoring opportunity with Marino's 10-yard touchdown pass to Tony Nathan on the next play, cutting their deficit to 24–14. Things looked even more promising for the Dolphins when they forced a punt and drove to the New England 38-yard line. But then Carter fumbled the ball and defensive end Julius Adams picked it up for the Patriots fourth fumble recovery of the day. New England then put the game away with a 9-play drive, featuring a 14-yard run by Tony Collins and a 13-yard carry by James. Tatupu later finished the drive with a 1-yard touchdown run, putting the score out of reach at 31–14. With 7:34 left in the game, Miami mounted one last spirited drive, moving the ball to the NE 8-yard line. But two penalties pushed them back to the 28, and then a desperate pass from Marino was picked off by Raymond Clayborn in the end zone.

James was their main contributor on offense, rushing for a career postseason high 105 yards of the Patriots 255 total rushing yards in a game played in a steady rain. Of note, the Patriots ran the ball on 59 out of 71 offensive plays, amassing 255 rushing yards in an upset of the favored Dolphins. Weathers added 87 yards, while Collins rushed for 61 and caught three passes for 15. Eason threw for just 71 yards, but completed 10 of 12 passes with three touchdowns and no interceptions. The win was the first for the Patriots at the Miami Orange Bowl since 1966, the Dolphins inaugural season, ending a string of 18 consecutive losses by the Patriots in Miami and earning the Patriots their first trip to the Super Bowl in franchise history, and becoming the first to do so by winning three playoff games on the road.

This was the second postseason meeting between the Patriots and Dolphins. Miami won the only prior meeting.

Previous playoff games
Miami leads 1–0 in all-time playoff games

1982

New England Patriots 13 @ Miami Dolphins 28

1982 AFC first round playoffs

== Super Bowl XX: Chicago Bears 46, New England Patriots 10 ==
Super Bowl XX – Chicago Bears vs. New England Patriots – Game summary

Quarter	1	2	3	4	Total
Bears (NFC)	13	10	21	2	46
Patriots (AFC)	3	0	0	7	10

at Louisiana Superdome, New Orleans, Louisiana

- Date: January 26, 1986
- Game attendance: 73,818
- Referee: Red Cashion
- TV announcers (NBC): Dick Enberg (play-by-play) and Merlin Olsen (color commentator)

This was the first Super Bowl meeting between the Bears and Patriots.
