= 1985 New England Patriots season =

NFL team season

- Owner: Billy Sullivan
- General manager: Patrick Sullivan
- Head coach: Raymond Berry
- Defensive coordinator: Rod Rust
- Home stadium: Sullivan Stadium

Results
- Record: 11–5
- Division place: 3rd AFC East
- Playoffs: Won Wild Card Playoffs (at Jets) 26–14; Won Divisional Playoffs (at Raiders) 27–20; Won AFC Championship (at Dolphins) 31–14; Lost Super Bowl XX (vs. Bears) 10–46
- All-Pros: 4: G John Hannah (1st team); LB Andre Tippett (1st team); T Brian Holloway (2nd team); WR Irving Fryar (2nd team)
- Pro Bowlers: 8: CB Raymond Clayborn; KR Irving Fryar; G John Hannah; T Brian Holloway; RB Craig James; FS Fred Marion; LB Steve Nelson; LB Andre Tippett

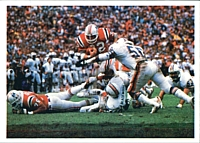
Craig James rushes the ball past the Dolphins' defense in the AFC Championship game.

The 1985 New England Patriots season was the franchise's 16th season in the National Football League (NFL) and 26th overall. The Patriots had a record of eleven wins and five losses and finished third in the AFC East Division. They then became the first team in NFL history ever to advance to the Super Bowl by winning three playoff games on the road, defeating the New York Jets 26–14 in the AFC Wild Card Game, the Los Angeles Raiders 27–20 in the AFC Divisional Game and the Miami Dolphins 31–14 in the AFC Championship Game. The Patriots' win in Miami was their first victory at the Miami Orange Bowl since 1966. (Note: While they did defeat Miami on the road in 1969, that game was played in Tampa Bay.) The win over the Dolphins in the game has gone down as one of the greatest upsets in NFL history, as the Dolphins (the only team to defeat the Chicago Bears that year) were heavily favored.

But despite the Patriots' success in the playoffs, they proved unable to compete with the acclaimed 15–1 Chicago Bears in Super Bowl XX, losing 46–10 in what was at the time the most lopsided defeat in Super Bowl history. The Patriots were held to a Super Bowl record of just seven rushing yards and their quarterbacks, Tony Eason and Steve Grogan, were sacked a combined seven times by the Bears defense.

== Offseason ==
=== NFL draft ===
1985 New England Patriots draft
Round	Pick	Player	Position	College	Notes
1	28	Trevor Matich	Center	BYU	
2	48	Garin Veris	Defensive end	Stanford	
2	52	Jim Bowman	Cornerback	Central Michigan	
2	56	Ben Thomas	Defensive end	Auburn	
3	84	Audray McMillian *	Cornerback	Houston	
Made roster * Made at least one Pro Bowl during career

== Personnel ==
=== Staff ===
1985 New England Patriots staff
Front office: President – Billy Sullivan; Executive vice president – Chuck Sullivan; Vice president – Bucko Kilroy; General manager – Patrick Sullivan; Director of player development – Dick Steinberg; Director of college scouting – Joe Mendes; Director of pro scouting – Bill McPeak; Special assistant to the head coach – John Polonchek; Head coaches: Head coach – Raymond Berry; Assistant head coach-offense/offensive line – Rod Humenuik; Offensive coaches: Quarterbacks/receivers – Les Steckel; Offensive backfield – Bobby Grier; Assistant receivers – Harold Jackson	Defensive coaches: Defensive coordinator – Rod Rust; Defensive line – Eddie Khayat; Assistant defensive line – Ray Hamilton; Linebackers – Don Shinnick; Defensive backfield – Jim Carr; Special teams coaches: Special teams/tight ends – Dante Scarnecchia; Strength and conditioning: Strength and conditioning – Dean Brittenham

=== Roster ===
1985 New England Patriots roster
Quarterbacks (QB): 14 Steve Grogan; 11 Tony Eason; 12 Tom Ramsey; Running backs (RB): 33 Tony Collins; 32 Craig James; 30 Mosi Tatupu; 24 Robert Weathers; Wide receivers (WR): 80 Irving Fryar; 83 Cedric Jones; 86 Stanley Morgan; 81 Stephen Starring; 82 Derwin Williams; Tight ends (TE): 87 Lin Dawson; 27 Greg Hawthorne; 88 Derrick Ramsey	Offensive linemen (OL): 58 Pete Brock C; 66 Paul Fairchild G; 73 John Hannah G; 76 Brian Holloway T; 67 Steve Moore T; 75 Guy Morriss C/LS; 70 Art Plunkett T; 61 Ron Wooten G; Defensive linemen (DL): 85 Julius Adams DE; 92 Smiley Creswell DE; 98 Dennis Owens NT; 99 Ben Thomas DE; 60 Garin Veris DE; 72 Lester Williams NT	Linebackers (LB): 55 Don Blackmon OLB; 51 Brian Ingram OLB; 50 Larry McGrew ILB; 57 Steve Nelson ILB; 52 Johnny Rembert ILB; 95 Ed Reynolds ILB; 56 Andre Tippett OLB; 54 Ed Williams OLB; Defensive backs (DB): 28 Jim Bowman FS/SS; 26 Raymond Clayborn CB; 43 Ernest Gibson CB; 38 Roland James SS; 42 Ronnie Lippett CB; 31 Fred Marion FS; 23 Rod McSwain CB; Special teams (ST): 3 Rich Camarillo P; 1 Tony Franklin K	Reserve: 14 Steve Grogan QB (IR); 68 Darryl Haley T (NF-Ill.); 36 Eric Jordan RB (NF-Inj.); 64 Trevor Matich C/G (IR); 18 Gerard Phelan WR (IR); 41 Bo Robinson RB (IR); 77 Kenneth Sims DE (IR); 74 Tom Toth T (IR); 53 Clayton Weishuhn LB (IR); 44 Jon Williams RB (IR); 90 Toby Williams DE (IR); 48 Darryal Wilson WR (PUP); Rookies in italics

== Schedule ==
Week	Date	Opponent	Result	Record	Venue	Attendance
1	September 8	Green Bay Packers	**W** 26–20	1–0	Sullivan Stadium	49,488
2	September 15	at Chicago Bears	**L** 7–20	1–1	Soldier Field	60,533
3	September 22	at **Buffalo Bills**	**W** 17–14	2–1	Rich Stadium	40,334
4	September 29	Los Angeles Raiders	**L** 20–35	2–2	Sullivan Stadium	60,686
5	October 6	at Cleveland Browns	**L** 20–24	2–3	Cleveland Municipal Stadium	62,139
6	October 13	**Buffalo Bills**	**W** 14–3	3–3	Sullivan Stadium	40,462
7	October 20	**New York Jets**	**W** 20–13	4–3	Sullivan Stadium	58,163
8	October 27	at Tampa Bay Buccaneers	**W** 32–14	5–3	Tampa Stadium	34,661
9	November 3	**Miami Dolphins**	**W** 17–13	6–3	Sullivan Stadium	58,811
10	November 10	**Indianapolis Colts**	**W** 34–15	7–3	Sullivan Stadium	54,176
11	November 17	at Seattle Seahawks	**W** 20–13	8–3	Kingdome	60,345
12	November 24	at **New York Jets**	**L** 13–16 (OT)	8–4	Giants Stadium	74,100
13	December 1	at **Indianapolis Colts**	**W** 38–31	9–4	Hoosier Dome	56,740
14	December 8	Detroit Lions	**W** 23–6	10–4	Sullivan Stadium	59,078
15	December 16	at **Miami Dolphins**	**L** 27–30	10–5	Miami Orange Bowl	69,489
16	December 22	Cincinnati Bengals	**W** 34–23	11–5	Sullivan Stadium	57,953
Note: Intra-division opponents are in **bold** text.

=== Game summaries ===
==== Week 1 ====
Team	1	2	3	4	Total
Packers	0	6	0	14	20
• Patriots	7	12	0	7	26

- Date: September 8
- Location: Sullivan Stadium
- Game start: 1:00 p.m.
- Game attendance: 49,488
- Game weather: 74 °F (23 °C); wind 10 mph (16 km/h)
- Referee: Bob McElwee
- TV announcers (CBS): Jim Hill and John Dockery

Scoring summary
Q1	9:33	NE	Collins 11 yard run (Franklin kick)	NE 7–0
Q2	11:40	NE	Franklin 34 yard field goal	NE 10–0
Q2	10:24	NE	Dickey tackled by Blackmon in end zone	NE 12–0
Q2	2:20	GB	Ellis 1 yard run (kick failed)	NE 12–6
Q2	0:08	NE	Jones 3 yard pass from Eason (Franklin kick)	NE 19–6
Q4	6:23	NE	James 65 yard run (Franklin kick)	NE 26–6
Q4	3:51	GB	Coffman 8 yard pass from Dickey (Del Greco kick)	NE 26–13
Q4	0:25	GB	Clark 23 yard run (Del Greco kick)	NE 26–20

==== Week 2 ====
Team	1	2	3	4	Total
Patriots	0	0	0	7	7
• Bears	7	3	10	0	20

- Date: September 15
- Location: Soldier Field
- Referee: Tom Dooley
- TV announcers (NBC): Don Criqui and Bob Trumpy

==== Week 3 ====
Team	1	2	3	4	Total
• **Patriots**	3	7	7	0	17
Bills	0	7	0	7	14

- Date: September 22
- Location: Rich Stadium • Orchard Park, New York
- Game start: 1:00 p.m. EST
- Game weather: 65 °F (18 °C) • Wind 7 mph (11 km/h)
- Referee: Jerry Seeman
- Television network: NBC

Scoring summary
1	NE	Tony Franklin 32-yard field goal	Patriots 3–0
2	BUF	Greg Bell 16-yard pass from Vince Ferragamo (Scott Norwood kick)	Bills 7–3
2	NE	Tony Collins 5-yard pass from Craig James (Tony Franklin kick)	Patriots 10–7
3	NE	Irving Fryar 85-yard punt return (Tony Franklin kick)	Patriots 17–7
4	BUF	Andre Reed 18-yard pass from Vince Ferragamo (Scott Norwood kick)	Patriots 17–14

==== Week 4 ====
Team	1	2	3	4	Total
• Raiders	14	0	7	14	35
Patriots	10	10	0	0	20

- Date: September 29
- Location: Sullivan Stadium
- Referee: Gordon McCarter
- TV announcers (NBC): Marv Albert and Bob Griese

==== Week 5 ====
Team	1	2	3	4	Total
Patriots	0	13	7	0	20
• Browns	7	7	3	7	24

- Date: October 6
- Location: Cleveland Stadium
- Referee: Jerry Markbreit

==== Week 6 ====
Team	1	2	3	4	Total
Bills	0	3	0	0	3
• **Patriots**	0	0	7	7	14

- Date: October 13
- Location: Sullivan Stadium • Foxboro, Massachusetts
- Game start: 1:00 p.m. EST
- Game weather: 50 °F (10 °C) • Wind 12 mph (19 km/h)
- Referee: Gene Barth
- TV announcers (NBC): Len Berman and Reggie Rucker

Scoring summary
2	BUF	Scott Norwood 47-yard field goal	Bills 3–0
3	NE	Irving Fryar 16-yard pass from Steve Grogan (Tony Franklin kick)	Patriots 7–3
4	NE	Raymond Clayborn 27-yard interception return (Tony Franklin kick)	Patriots 14–3

==== Week 7 vs Jets ====
Week Seven: New York Jets (5–1) at New England Patriots (3–3)

Quarter	1	2	3	4	Total
Jets	0	3	3	7	**13**
**Patriots**	3	3	0	14	**20**

at Sullivan Stadium, Foxboro, Massachusetts

- Date: October 20
- Game time: 4:00 p.m. EST
- Game weather: 54 °F (12 °C)
- Game attendance: 58,163
- Referee: Fred Silva
- TV announcers (NBC): Marv Albert & Bob Griese
- Box Score, Box Score

Game information

**First quarter**

- NE – Tony Franklin 19-yard field goal, 1:56. Patriots 3–0. Drive:

**Second quarter**

- NYJ – Pat Leahy 53-yard field goal, 9:30. Tie 3–3. Drive:
- NE – Tony Franklin 44-yard field goal, 2:37. Patriots 6–3. Drive:

**Third quarter**

- NYJ – Pat Leahy 52-yard field goal, 5:48. Tie 6–6. Drive:

**Fourth quarter**

- NE – Irving Fryar 36-yard pass from Steve Grogan (Tony Franklin kick), 10:22. Patriots 13–6. Drive:
- NYJ – Tony Paige 2-yard run (Pat Leahy kick), 6:50. Tie 13–13. Drive:
- NE – Steve Grogan 3-yard run (Tony Franklin kick), 3:27. Patriots 20–13. Drive:

Top passers

- NYJ – Ken O'Brien – 15/31, 246 yards, INT
- NE – Steve Grogan – 11/32, 171 yards, TD, INT

Top rushers

- NYJ – Johnny Hector – 21 rushes, 80 yards
- NE – Craig James – 22 rushes, 94 yards

Top receivers

- NYJ – Wesley Walker – 6 receptions, 140 yards
- NE – Stanley Morgan – 3 receptions, 71 yards

==== Week 8 ====
Team	1	2	3	4	Total
• Patriots	0	13	3	16	32
Buccaneers	14	0	0	0	14

- Date: October 27
- Location: Tampa Stadium
- Referee: Tom Dooley
- Television network: NBC

==== Week 9 ====
Team	1	2	3	4	Total
Dolphins	7	3	3	0	13
• Patriots	0	3	0	14	17

- Date: November 3
- Location: Sullivan Stadium
- Referee: Fred Wyant
- TV announcers (NBC): Jay Randolph and Bob Griese

==== Week 10 ====
Team	1	2	3	4	Total
Colts	0	6	0	9	15
• Patriots	0	7	17	10	34

- Date: November 10
- Location: Sullivan Stadium
- Referee: Gordon McCarter

==== Week 11 ====
Team	1	2	3	4	Total
• Patriots	0	7	0	13	20
Seahawks	0	3	10	0	13

- Date: November 17
- Location: Kingdome
- Referee: Jerry Markbreit
- TV announcers (NBC): Dick Enberg and Merlin Olsen

==== Week 12 ====
Team	1	2	3	4	OT	Total
Patriots	0	3	0	10	0	13
• Jets	6	0	7	0	3	16

- Date: November 24
- Location: Giants Stadium
- Referee: Bob Frederic
- TV announcers (NBC): Charlie Jones and Merlin Olsen

==== Week 13 ====
Team	1	2	3	4	Total
• Patriots	7	17	0	14	38
Colts	7	10	0	14	31

- Date: December 1
- Location: Hoosier Dome
- Referee: Bob McElwee
- Television network: NBC

==== Week 14 ====
Team	1	2	3	4	Total
Lions	3	0	3	0	6
• Patriots	7	10	0	6	23

- Date: December 8
- Location: Sullivan Stadium
- Referee: Gene Barth
- TV announcers (CBS): Jim Hill and John Dockery

==== Week 15 ====
Team	1	2	3	4	Total
Patriots	7	0	3	17	27
• Dolphins	7	10	3	10	30

- Date: December 16
- Location: Orange Bowl
- Game start: 9:00 EST
- Referee: Dick Jorgensen
- TV announcers (ABC): Frank Gifford, Joe Namath, OJ Simpson

==== Week 16 ====
Team	1	2	3	4	Total
Bengals	3	3	7	10	23
• Patriots	10	10	0	14	34

- Date: December 22
- Location: Sullivan Stadium, Foxboro, Massachusetts
- Game start: 1:00 p.m.
- Game weather: 24 °F (−4 °C), wind 12 mph (19 km/h)
- Referee: Red Cashion
- TV announcers (NBC): Phil Stone and Sam Rutigliano

Scoring summary
1	NE	Tony Franklin 25 yard field goal	Patriots 3–0
1	CIN	Jim Breech 42 yard field goal	Tie 3–3
1	NE	Stanley Morgan 50 yard pass from Tony Eason (Tony Franklin kick)	Patriots 10–3
2	CIN	Jim Breech 22 yard field goal	Patriots 10–6
2	NE	Tony Collins 9 yard run (Tony Franklin kick)	Patriots 17–6
2	NE	Tony Franklin 30 yard field goal	Patriots 20–6
3	CIN	Eddie Brown 33 yard pass from Boomer Esiason (Jim Breech kick)	Patriots 20–13
4	CIN	Jim Breech 30 yard field goal	Patriots 20–16
4	NE	Craig James 11 yard run (Tony Franklin kick)	Patriots 27–16
4	CIN	Cris Collinsworth 8 yard pass from Boomer Esiason (Jim Breech kick)	Patriots 27–23
4	NE	Robert Weathers 42 yard run (Tony Franklin kick)	Patriots 34–23

After winning against the Bengals, fans stormed the field and tore down the goal posts. Fans proceeded to walk down Route 1 with the goalposts, accidentally hitting an overhead wire and nearly electrocuting themselves.

== Postseason ==
Round	Date	Opponent (seed)	Result	Record	Venue	Attendance
Wild card	December 28	at New York Jets (4)	W 26–14	1–0	Giants Stadium	70,958
Divisional	January 5, 1986	at Los Angeles Raiders (1)	W 27–20	2–0	Los Angeles Memorial Coliseum	88,936
AFC Championship	January 12, 1986	at Miami Dolphins (2)	W 31–14	3–0	Miami Orange Bowl	74,978
Super Bowl XX	January 26, 1986	Chicago Bears (N1)	L 10–46	3–1	Louisiana Superdome	73,818

=== Wild card ===
Team	1	2	3	4	Total
• Patriots	3	10	10	3	26
Jets	0	7	7	0	14

- Date: December 28, 1985
- Location: The Meadowlands
- Referee: Jerry Seeman

This was only the second postseason win in Patriots history, and the first since 1963.

=== Divisional ===
Team	1	2	3	4	Total
• Patriots	7	10	10	0	27
Raiders	3	17	0	0	20

- Date: January 5, 1986
- Location: Los Angeles Memorial Coliseum
- Referee: Jerry Markbreit
- TV announcers (NBC): Dick Enberg and Merlin Olsen

=== Conference championship ===
Team	1	2	3	4	Total
• Patriots	3	14	7	7	31
Dolphins	0	7	0	7	14

- Date: January 12, 1986
- Location: Orange Bowl
- Referee: Gene Barth
- TV announcers (NBC): Dick Enberg and Merlin Olsen

In the 1985 AFC Championship Game, the Patriots ran the ball on 59 out of 71 offensive plays, amassing 255 rushing yards in an upset of the favored Dolphins.

The New England Patriots became the first team in NFL history to win three playoff games on the road in the same postseason.

=== Super Bowl ===
Team	1	2	3	4	Total
• Bears	13	10	21	2	46
Patriots	3	0	0	7	10

- Date: January 26, 1986
- Location: Louisiana Superdome
- Referee: Red Cashion

== Standings ==
AFC East
	W	L	T	PCT	DIV	CONF	PF	PA	STK
Miami Dolphins^{(2)}	12	4	0	.750	6–2	9–3	428	320	W7
New York Jets^{(4)}	11	5	0	.688	6–2	9–3	393	264	W1
New England Patriots^{(5)}	11	5	0	.688	6–2	8–4	362	290	W1
Indianapolis Colts	5	11	0	.313	1–7	2–10	320	386	W2
Buffalo Bills	2	14	0	.125	1–7	2–12	200	381	L6
