= 1983 New England Patriots season =

Season of National Football League team the New England Patriots

- Owner: Billy Sullivan
- General manager: Patrick Sullivan
- Head coach: Ron Meyer
- Home stadium: Sullivan Stadium

Results
- Record: 8–8
- Division place: T-2nd AFC East
- Playoffs: Did not qualify
- All-Pros: G John Hannah (1st team); P Rich Camarillo (2nd team)
- Pro Bowlers: P Rich Camarillo; CB Raymond Clayborn; RB Tony Collins; G John Hannah; T Brian Holloway

The 1983 New England Patriots season was the franchise's 14th season in the National Football League and 24th overall. The Patriots played inconsistently all season, but at 8–7 had a chance for a playoff spot with a win in their final game of the season in Seattle. The Patriots would have problems with turnovers as rookie quarterback Tony Eason was swallowed up in a 24–6 loss to the Seahawks.

In the first week of December, in shocking conditions with sleet and snow, the Patriots’ game with wild card contender New Orleans Saints saw just one score set up by Ricky Smith returning the Saints’ initial kickoff to the 3-yard line. As of 2023, this game remains the most recent 7–0 result in NFL history, with only three games since seeing just one score, all three of which a single field goal was the only score.

== Draft ==
1983 New England Patriots draft
Round	Pick	Player	Position	College	Notes
1	15	Tony Eason	Quarterback	Illinois	
2	47	Darryal Wilson	Wide receiver	Tennessee	
3	74	Stephen Starring	Wide receiver	McNeese State	
3	80	Steve Moore	Guard	Tennessee State	
4	101	Johnny Rembert *	Linebacker	Clemson	
5	118	Smiley Creswell	Defensive end	Michigan State	
5	128	Darryl Lewis	Tight end	Texas-Arlington	
6	155	Mike Bass	Placekicker	Illinois	
7	187	Craig James *	Running back	Southern Methodist	
8	214	Ronnie Lippett	Cornerback	Miami (FL)	
9	233	Ricky Williams	Running back	Langston	
9	240	Mark Keel	Tight end	Arizona	
10	264	James Williams	Tight end	Wyoming	
10	265	Toby Williams	Defensive end	Nebraska	
10	267	Tom Ramsey	Quarterback	UCLA	
11	292	Steve Parker	Wide receiver	Abilene Christian	
11	294	Calvin Eason	Defensive back	Houston	
12	319	Waddell Kelly	Running back	Arkansas State	
12	326	Andy Ekern	Offensive tackle	Missouri	
Made roster † Pro Football Hall of Fame * Made at least one Pro Bowl during career

== Staff ==
New England Patriots 1983 staff
Front office: President – Billy Sullivan; Executive vice president – Chuck Sullivan; Vice-president – Bucko Kilroy; General manager – Patrick Sullivan; Director of player development – Dick Steinberg; Director of college scouting – Joe Mendes; Director of pro scouting – Bill McPeak; Head coaches: Head coach – Ron Meyer; Offensive coaches: Offensive coordinator/quarterbacks – Lew Erber; Offensive backs – Cleve Bryant; Receivers – Steve Endicott; Offensive line – Bill Muir	Defensive coaches: Defensive coordinator – Rod Rust; Defensive line – Tommy Brasher; Linebackers – Steve Sidwell; Secondary – Steve Walters; Special teams coaches: Special teams/tight ends – Dante Scarnecchia; Strength and conditioning: Strength and conditioning – LeBaron Caruthers

== Roster ==
1983 New England Patriots roster
Quarterbacks (QB): 11 Tony Eason; 14 Steve Grogan; 19 Mike Kerrigan; Running backs (RB): 33 Tony Collins; 30 Mosi Tatupu; 34 Mark van Eeghen; 24 Robert Weathers; 35 George Peoples; Wide receivers (WR): 83 Cedric Jones; 86 Stanley Morgan; 81 Stephen Starring; 82 Clarence Weathers; Tight ends (TE): 87 Lin Dawson; 88 Derrick Ramsey; 80 Brooks Williams	Offensive linemen (OL): 58 Pete Brock C; 75 Bob Cryder T; 68 Darryl Haley T; 73 John Hannah G; 76 Brian Holloway T; 78 Art Kuehn C; 67 Steve Moore G/T; 62 Dwight Wheeler C; 60 Ron Wooten G; Defensive linemen (DL): 85 Julius Adams DE; 74 Dave Browning DE; 98 Dennis Owens NT; 65 Doug Rogers DE; 77 Kenneth Sims DE; 72 Lester Williams NT; 90 Toby Williams DE	Linebackers (LB): 55 Don Blackmon OLB; 59 Tim Golden ILB; 50 Larry McGrew OLB; 57 Steve Nelson ILB; 56 Andre Tippett OLB; 53 Clayton Weishuhn ILB; 52 Johnny Rembert ILB; 95 Ed Reynolds OLB; Defensive backs (DB): 26 Raymond Clayborn CB; 38 Roland James SS; 22 Keith Lee CB/S; 42 Ronnie Lippett CB; 31 Fred Marion FS; 24 Rick Sanford FS; 27 Ricky Smith CB; 47 Paul Dombroski CB; Special teams (ST): 3 Rich Camarillo P; 2 Joaquin Zendejas K	Reserve: 92 Smiley Creswell DE (IR); 91 George Crump DE (IR); 60 Andy Ekern T (IR); 70 Luther Henson NT (IR); 51 Brian Ingram LB (IR); 49 Darryl Lewis TE (IR); 48 Darryal Wilson WR (IR); Rookies in italics

== Regular season ==
=== Schedule ===
Week	Date	Opponent	Result	Record	Venue	Attendance
1	September 4	**Baltimore Colts**	**L** 23–29	0–1	Sullivan Stadium	45,526
2	September 11	at **Miami Dolphins**	**L** 24–34	0–2	Miami Orange Bowl	59,343
3	September 18	**New York Jets**	**W** 23–13	1–2	Sullivan Stadium	43,182
4	September 25	at Pittsburgh Steelers	**W** 28–23	2–2	Three Rivers Stadium	58,282
5	October 2	San Francisco 49ers	**L** 13–33	2–3	Sullivan Stadium	54,293
6	October 9	at **Baltimore Colts**	**L** 7–12	2–4	Memorial Stadium	35,618
7	October 16	San Diego Chargers	**W** 37–21	3–4	Sullivan Stadium	59,016
8	October 23	at **Buffalo Bills**	**W** 31–0	4–4	Rich Stadium	60,424
9	October 30	at Atlanta Falcons	**L** 13–24	4–5	Atlanta–Fulton County Stadium	47,546
10	November 6	**Buffalo Bills**	**W** 21–7	5–5	Sullivan Stadium	42,604
11	November 13	**Miami Dolphins**	**W** 17–6	6–5	Sullivan Stadium	60,771
12	November 20	Cleveland Browns	**L** 0–30	6–6	Sullivan Stadium	40,987
13	November 27	at **New York Jets**	**L** 3–26	6–7	Shea Stadium	48,620
14	December 4	New Orleans Saints	**W** 7–0	7–7	Sullivan Stadium	24,579
15	December 11	at Los Angeles Rams	**W** 21–7	8–7	Anaheim Stadium	46,503
16	December 18	at Seattle Seahawks	**L** 6–24	8–8	Kingdome	59,688
Note: Intra-division opponents are in **bold** text.

=== Standings ===
AFC East
	W	L	T	PCT	DIV	CONF	PF	PA	STK
Miami Dolphins^{(2)}	12	4	0	.750	6–2	9–3	389	250	W5
New England Patriots	8	8	0	.500	4–4	6–6	274	289	L1
Buffalo Bills	8	8	0	.500	4–4	7–5	283	351	L2
Baltimore Colts	7	9	0	.438	3–5	5–9	264	354	W1
New York Jets	7	9	0	.438	3–5	4–8	313	331	L2

== See also ==
- List of New England Patriots seasons
