= 1986 New England Patriots season =

Season of National Football League team the New England Patriots

- Owner: Billy Sullivan
- General manager: Patrick Sullivan
- Head coach: Raymond Berry
- Defensive coordinator: Rod Rust
- Home stadium: Sullivan Stadium

Results
- Record: 11–5
- Division place: 1st AFC East
- Playoffs: Lost Divisional Playoffs (at Broncos) 17–22
- All-Pros: K Tony Franklin (2nd team); WR Stanley Morgan (2nd team); LB Andre Tippett (2nd team)
- Pro Bowlers: CB Raymond Clayborn; K Tony Franklin; WR Stanley Morgan; SpT Mosi Tatupu; LB Andre Tippett

The 1986 New England Patriots season was the franchise's 17th season in the National Football League and 27th overall. The Patriots matched their 11–5 record from the previous season, but this time they finished first in the AFC East, thus winning the division title. This would be the last AFC East Division title the Patriots would win until 1996 and their last playoff appearance until 1994. In the divisional round of the playoffs the Denver Broncos defeated the New England Patriots 22–17.

== Staff ==
New England Patriots 1986 staff
Front office: President – Billy Sullivan; Executive vice president – Chuck Sullivan; Vice-president – Bucko Kilroy; General manager – Patrick Sullivan; Director of player development – Dick Steinberg; Director of college scouting – Joe Mendes; Director of pro scouting – Bill McPeak; Special assistant to the head coach – John Polonchek; Head coaches: Head coach – Raymond Berry; Offensive coaches: Offensive coordinator/offensive line – Rod Humenuik; Quarterbacks/receivers – Les Steckel; Offensive backfield/running game coordinator – Bobby Grier; Receivers – Harold Jackson	Defensive coaches: Defensive coordinator – Rod Rust; Defensive line – Eddie Khayat; Assistant defensive line – Ray Hamilton; Linebackers – Don Shinnick; Defensive backfield – Jim Carr; Special teams coaches: Special teams/tight ends – Dante Scarnecchia; Strength and conditioning: Strength and conditioning – Dean Brittenham

== Roster ==
1986 New England Patriots roster
Quarterbacks (QB): 11 Tony Eason; 14 Steve Grogan; 12 Tom Ramsey; Running backs (RB): 33 Tony Collins; 21 Reggie Dupard; 32 Craig James; 30 Mosi Tatupu; Wide receivers (WR): 80 Irving Fryar; 83 Cedric Jones; 86 Stanley Morgan; 81 Stephen Starring; 82 Derwin Williams; Tight ends (TE): 48 Greg Baty; 27 Greg Hawthorne; 88 Willie Scott	Offensive linemen (OL): 62 Bill Bain T; 58 Pete Brock C; 66 Paul Fairchild G; 68 Darryl Haley T; 76 Brian Holloway T; 64 Trevor Matich T/G; 75 Guy Morriss C/G; 61 Ron Wooten G; Defensive linemen (DL): 97 Milford Hodge DE; 98 Dennis Owens NT; 60 Garin Veris DE; 96 Brent Williams DE; 90 Toby Williams NT	Linebackers (LB): 94 Mel Black OLB; 55 Don Blackmon OLB; 59 Steve Doig ILB; 50 Larry McGrew ILB; 52 Johnny Rembert ILB; 95 Ed Reynolds ILB; 56 Andre Tippett OLB; Defensive backs (DB): 28 Jim Bowman SS; 26 Raymond Clayborn CB; 43 Ernest Gibson CB; 38 Roland James SS; 42 Ronnie Lippett CB; 31 Fred Marion FS; 23 Rod McSwain CB; 22 Gene Profit CB; Special teams (ST): 3 Rich Camarillo P; 1 Tony Franklin K	Reserve: 92 Smiley Creswell DE (IR); 87 Lin Dawson TE (IR); 51 Brian Ingram LB (IR); 45 Mark Keel TE (IR); 67 Steve Moore T (IR); 57 Steve Nelson LB (IR); 70 Art Plunkett T (IR); 65 Mike Ruth NT (IR); 77 Kenneth Sims DE (IR); 24 Robert Weathers RB (IR); 53 Clayton Weishuhn LB (IR); 54 Ed Williams LB (IR); Rookies in italics

== Regular season ==
=== Schedule ===
Week	Date	Opponent	Result	Record	Venue	Attendance
1	September 7	**Indianapolis Colts**	**W** 33–3	1–0	Sullivan Stadium	55,208
2	September 11	at **New York Jets**	**W** 20–6	2–0	Giants Stadium	72,422
3	September 21	Seattle Seahawks	**L** 31–38	2–1	Sullivan Stadium	58,977
4	September 28	at Denver Broncos	**L** 20–27	2–2	Mile High Stadium	75,804
5	October 5	**Miami Dolphins**	**W** 34–7	3–2	Sullivan Stadium	60,689
6	October 12	**New York Jets**	**L** 24–31	3–3	Sullivan Stadium	60,342
7	October 19	at Pittsburgh Steelers	**W** 34–0	4–3	Three Rivers Stadium	54,743
8	October 26	at **Buffalo Bills**	**W** 23–3	5–3	Rich Stadium	77,808
9	November 2	Atlanta Falcons	**W** 25–17	6–3	Sullivan Stadium	60,597
10	November 9	at **Indianapolis Colts**	**W** 30–21	7–3	Hoosier Dome	56,890
11	November 16	at Los Angeles Rams	**W** 30–28	8–3	Anaheim Stadium	64,339
12	November 23	**Buffalo Bills**	**W** 22–19	9–3	Sullivan Stadium	60,455
13	November 30	at New Orleans Saints	**W** 21–20	10–3	Superdome	58,259
14	December 7	Cincinnati Bengals	**L** 7–31	10–4	Sullivan Stadium	60,633
15	December 14	San Francisco 49ers	**L** 24–29	10–5	Sullivan Stadium	60,787
16	December 21	at **Miami Dolphins**	**W** 34–27	11–5	Orange Bowl	74,516
Note: Intra-division opponents are in **bold** text.

Round	Date	Opponent (seed)	Result	Record	Venue	Attendance
Divisional	January 4, 1987	at Denver Broncos (2)	**L** 17–22	0–1	Mile High Stadium	76,105

=== Game summaries ===
==== Week 8 ====
Team	1	2	3	4	Total
• Patriots	7	10	3	3	23
Bills	0	0	3	0	3

- Date: October 26
- Location: Rich Stadium, Orchard Park, New York
- Game start: 1:00 p.m.
- Game weather: 51 °F (11 °C); wind 7 mph (11 km/h)
- Referee: Bob McElwee

Scoring summary
Q1	NE	James 2 yard run (Franklin kick)	NE 7–0
Q2	NE	Franklin 31 yard field goal	NE 10–0
Q2	NE	Weathers 16 yard run (Franklin kick)	NE 17–0
Q3	BUF	Norwood 26 yard field goal	NE 17–3
Q3	NE	Franklin 27 yard field goal	NE 20–3
Q4	NE	Franklin 26 yard field goal	NE 23–3

=== Standings ===
AFC East
	W	L	T	PCT	DIV	CONF	PF	PA	STK
New England Patriots^{(3)}	11	5	0	.688	7–1	8–4	412	307	W1
New York Jets^{(4)}	10	6	0	.625	6–2	8–4	364	386	L5
Miami Dolphins	8	8	0	.500	5–3	6–6	430	405	L1
Buffalo Bills	4	12	0	.250	1–7	3–11	287	348	L3
Indianapolis Colts	3	13	0	.188	1–7	2–10	229	400	W3

== See also ==
- New England Patriots seasons
