= Bears–Giants rivalry =

National Football League rivalry

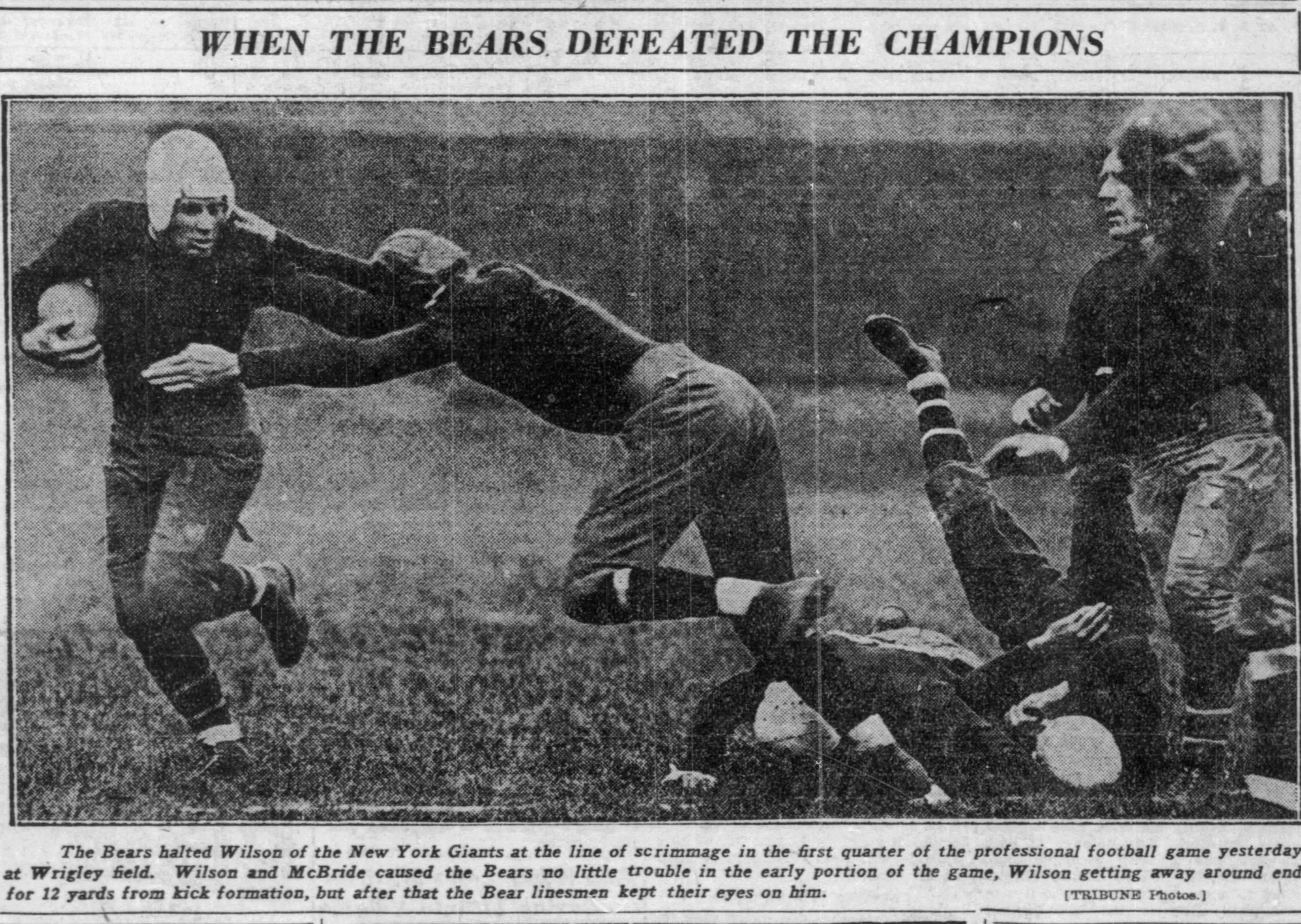
- The Bears and Giants playing in 1928

- Chicago Bears New York Giants
- Location: Chicago, New York City
- First meeting: December 6, 1925; Bears 19, Giants 7
- Latest meeting: November 9, 2025; Bears 24, Giants 20
- Next meeting: TBD (no later than the 2028 regular season)
- Stadiums: Bears: Soldier Field; Giants: MetLife Stadium

Statistics
- Total meetings: 64
- All-time series: Bears: 37–25–2
- Regular season series: Bears: 31–22–2
- Postseason results: Bears: 5–3
- Largest victory: Bears: 56–7 (1943); Giants: 47–7 (1956)
- Most points scored: Bears: 56 (1943); Giants: 47 (1956)
- Longest win streak: Bears: 5 (1970–1987); Giants: 4 (1929–1930)
- Current win streak: Bears: 1 (2025–present)

Post–season history
- 1933 NFL Championship Game: Bears won: 23–21; 1934 NFL Championship Game: Giants won: 30–13; 1941 NFL Championship Game: Bears won: 37–9; 1946 NFL Championship Game: Bears won: 24–14; 1956 NFL Championship Game: Giants won: 47–7; 1963 NFL Championship Game: Bears won: 14–10; 1985 NFC Divisional: Bears won: 21–0; 1990 NFC Divisional: Giants won: 31–3

The Bears–Giants rivalry is a National Football League (NFL) rivalry between the Chicago Bears and New York Giants. The rivalry was notable for the six NFL championship games between the two teams before the creation of the Super Bowl, and the two subsequent Super Bowl-era playoff meetings that involved two of the NFL's greatest defensive units: the Bears' 46 defense crew helmed by Buddy Ryan, and the Giants' Big Blue Wrecking Crew mentored by Bill Belichick.

The Bears lead the overall series, 37–25–2. The two teams have met eight times in the playoffs, with the Bears holding a 5–3 record.

== History ==
=== Pre-Super Bowl era ===
The Bears and Giants met in six NFL Championship Games, the most common matchup in either the NFL Championship or the Super Bowl. Between 1933 and 1946, the two teams appeared in 12 of 14 championship games, winning a combined seven titles during that period. Their first meeting occurred in the inaugural NFL Championship Game at the end of the 1933 season, in which Chicago defeated New York 23–21 by scoring the winning touchdown in the final minutes of the fourth quarter. It was the Bears’ second consecutive championship, following their 1932 title that had been awarded based on regular-season winning percentage. The Giants won the rematch in the 1934 NFL Championship Game, defeating Chicago 30–13 after outscoring them 27–0 in the fourth quarter. The game became known as the “Sneakers Game” after the Giants switched to basketball shoes at halftime to improve traction on the frozen field at the Polo Grounds.

The Bears and Giants met for a third time in the 1941 NFL Championship Game. This game was notable as it happened two weeks following the Japanese attack on Pearl Harbor; as a result, only 13,341 fans attended the game at Wrigley Field, the lowest of any NFL championship game. The Bears dominated the Giants 37–9 to win their fifth NFL title, thanks to four unanswered touchdowns in the second half. A fourth meeting took place in the 1946 NFL Championship Game, in which a then-record 58,346 fans witnessed the Bears defeat the Giants 24–14 in New York. The game was tied 14–14 after three quarters before the Bears scored ten unanswered points. The victory was marred, however, by a bribery scandal involving two Giants players.

In the 1956 NFL Championship Game, the Giants routed the Bears 47–7 at Yankee Stadium to win the championship. It was the team's last title until Super Bowl XXI in 1986. Similar to the 1934 title game, the Giants wore sneakers in order to gain traction on an icy field. Seven years later, the Giants and Bears met for a sixth time to decide the 1963 NFL Championship. In a low-scoring affair, the Bears prevailed 14–10 to win their eighth NFL championship, their last until Super Bowl XX in 1985. It was also the final meeting between the Bears and Giants that decided the NFL championship.

=== Super Bowl era ===
Both teams entered rebuilding periods following the 1963 title game, but by the 1980s, the Bears and Giants had returned to championship contention, each led by two of the greatest defensive units in NFL history. Chicago’s 46 defense, coached by Mike Ditka and defensive coordinator Buddy Ryan, featured Hall of Fame linebacker Mike Singletary along with defensive linemen Richard Dent and Dan Hampton. New York’s “Big Blue Wrecking Crew,” coached by Bill Parcells and defensive coordinator Bill Belichick, included Hall of Fame linebackers Lawrence Taylor, Carl Banks, and Harry Carson.

The teams first met in the postseason in the 1985 NFC Divisional Round, where Chicago’s defense shut out New York 21–0. The game’s pivotal moment came when a punt attempt by Giants punter Sean Landeta was mishandled in the wind and returned five yards for a touchdown by Shaun Gayle. The Bears went on to win Super Bowl XX that season. The two teams met again in the 1990 NFC Divisional Round, which the Giants won 31–3 en route to a victory in Super Bowl XXV.

=== Recent years ===
After the 1990 playoff meeting, the rivalry cooled off a bit, though games between the two teams remained highly competitive. However, there were some notable moments that took place since then. During Week 10 of the 2006 season, Bears returner Devin Hester returned a missed field goal a then-record 108 yards for a touchdown, culminating in the Bears' 38–20 victory. The win proved crucial for the Bears as they went on to finish with the NFC's best record at 13–3, en route to a Super Bowl XLI appearance. The Giants, on the other hand, turned a 6–2 start into a 2–6 finish, ending with an 8–8 record and losing in the Wild Card Round to the rival Philadelphia Eagles. Then in Week 4 of the 2010 season, the Giants defense sacked Bears quarterback Jay Cutler nine times in the first half en route to a 17–3 victory, dealing Chicago its first loss of the season. In a Week 13 game in 2018, the Bears trailed the Giants 27–17. With 1:15 left in regulation, Bears kicker Cody Parkey kicked a field goal which made it 27–20. The Bears recovered the onside-kick with 1:13 left which was recovered by Daniel Brown. The Bears drove from their own 44 to the Giants' 1 with 3 seconds left. On a last ditch play, quarterback Chase Daniel handed it off to Trey Burton who tossed the ball back to Tarik Cohen and Cohen threw the ball for a touchdown to Anthony Miller with no time on the clock. The extra point by Parkey was good which sent the game to overtime tied at 27. The Giants won the overtime coin toss and received the ball. The Giants drove from their own 25 to the Bears' 23. They got backed to the 26 where they would kick a field goal to take a 30–27 lead with 5:57 left in the game. But the Bears failed to respond after Daniel fumbled 3 times and failed a last ditch pass deep down the field that was broken up to preserve a 30–27 Giants win.

== Season-by-season results ==
Chicago Bears vs. New York Giants season-by-season results
1920s (Giants, 5–3)

Season	Results	Location	Overall series	Notes
1925	Bears; 19–7	Polo Grounds	Bears; 1–0	Giants' inaugural season. First meeting at Polo Grounds.
1925	Giants; 9–0	Wrigley Field	Tied; 1–1	First meeting at Wrigley Field.
1926	Bears; 7–0	Wrigley Field	Bears; 2–1	
1927	Giants; 13–7	Polo Grounds	Tied; 2–2	Giants win 1927 NFL Championship.
1928	Bears; 13–0	Wrigley Field	Bears; 3–2	
1929	Giants; 26–14	Wrigley Field	Tied; 3–3	
1929	Giants; 34–0	Polo Grounds	Giants; 4–3	Giants take first lead in the series.
1929	Giants; 14–9	Wrigley Field	Giants; 5–3	

1930s (Bears, 11–6–1)

Season	Results	Location	Overall series	Notes
1930	Giants; 12–0	Wrigley Field	Giants; 6–3	
1930	Bears; 12–0	Polo Grounds	Giants; 6–4	
1931	Bears; 6–0	Wrigley Field	Giants; 6–5	
1931	Bears; 12–6	Polo Grounds	Tied; 6–6	
1931	Giants; 25–6	Wrigley Field	Giants; 7–6	
1932	Bears; 28–8	Polo Grounds	Tied; 7–7	After the loss to the Bears, the Giants went on a 13-game home winning streak. Bears won 1932 NFL Championship.
1932	Bears; 6–0	Wrigley Field	Bears; 8–7	After the loss to the Bears, the Giants went on a 13-game home winning streak. Bears won 1932 NFL Championship.
1933	Bears; 14–10	Wrigley Field	Bears; 9–7	
1933	Giants; 3–0	Polo Grounds	Bears; 9–8	
1933 playoffs	Bears 23–21	Wrigley Field	Bears 10–8	First scheduled NFL Championship game in league history.
1934	Bears; 27–7	Wrigley Field	Bears; 11–8	Bears' win snapped the Giants' 13-game home winning streak. It would also be the Giants only home loss in the 1934 season.
1934	Bears; 10–9	Polo Grounds	Bears; 12–8	
1934 playoffs	Giants 30–13	Polo Grounds	Bears 12–9	1934 NFL Championship Game. Popularly known as the Sneakers Game. Giants denied the Bears a perfect season by handing them their first and only loss after going undefeated in the regular season.
1935	Bears; 20–3	Polo Grounds	Bears; 13–9	Giants lose NFL Championship.
1935	Giants; 3–0	Wrigley Field	Bears; 13–10	Giants lose NFL Championship.
1936	Bears; 25–7	Polo Grounds	Bears; 14–10	
1937	Tie; 3–3	Polo Grounds	Bears; 14–10–1	Bears lose NFL Championship.
1939	Giants; 16–13	Polo Grounds	Bears; 14–11–1	Giants lose NFL Championship.

1940s (Bears, 6–2)

Season	Results	Location	Overall series	Notes
1940	Bears; 37–21	Polo Grounds	Bears; 15–11–1	Bears' win snapped the Giants' 15-game home winning streak. Bears win NFL Championship.
1941 playoffs	Bears 37–9	Wrigley Field	Bears 16–11–1	1941 NFL Championship Game
1942	Bears; 26–7	Wrigley Field	Bears; 17–11–1	Bears lose NFL Championship.
1943	Bears; 56–7	Polo Grounds	Bears; 18–11–1	Most lopsided Bears victory and highest-scoring game in the rivalry. Bears win NFL Championship.
1946	Giants; 14–0	Polo Grounds	Bears; 18–12–1	
1946 playoffs	Bears 24–14	Polo Grounds	Bears 19–12–1	1946 NFL Championship Game
1948	Bears; 35–14	Wrigley Field	Bears; 20–12–1	
1949	Giants; 35–28	Polo Grounds	Bears; 20–13–1	Final meeting at Polo Grounds.

1950s (Giants, 1–0–1)

Season	Results	Location	Overall series	Notes
1956	Tie; 17–17	Yankee Stadium	Bears; 20–13–2	First meeting at Yankee Stadium.
1956 playoffs	Giants 47–7	Yankee Stadium	Bears 20–14–2	NFL Championship Game. Giants' largest margin of victory in the rivalry.

1960s (Bears, 3–2)

Season	Results	Location	Overall series	Notes
1962	Giants; 26–24	Wrigley Field	Bears; 20–15–2	Giants lose NFL Championship.
1963 playoffs	Bears 14–10	Wrigley Field	Bears 21–15–2	Sixth and final NFL Championship Game between the two teams. The Bears finished with a 4–2 record in NFL Championship Games against the Giants. Last playoff meeting until 1985.
1965	Bears; 35–14	Yankee Stadium	Bears; 22–15–2	
1967	Bears; 34–7	Wrigley Field	Bears; 23–15–2	Final meeting at Wrigley Field.
1969	Giants; 28–24	Yankee Stadium	Bears; 23–16–2	

1970s (Bears, 3–0)

Season	Results	Location	Overall series	Notes
1970	Bears; 24–16	Yankee Stadium	Bears; 24–16–2	Final meeting at Yankee Stadium.
1974	Bears; 24–16	Soldier Field	Bears; 25–16–2	First meeting at Soldier Field.
1977	Bears; 12–9(OT)	Giants Stadium	Bears; 26–16–2	First meeting at Giants Stadium. Chicago's victory clinched their first post-season appearance since 1963.

1980s (Bears, 2–0)

Season	Results	Location	Overall series	Notes
1985 playoffs	Bears 21–0	Soldier Field	Bears 27–16–2	NFC Divisional Round. Bears win Super Bowl XX.
1987	Bears; 34–19	Soldier Field	Bears; 28–16–2	

1990s (Giants, 3–2)

Season	Results	Location	Overall series	Notes
1990 playoffs	Giants 31–3	Giants Stadium	Bears 28–17–2	NFC Divisional Round. First meeting in New York since 1977. Giants win Super Bowl XXV. Most recent playoff meeting between the two teams.
1991	Bears; 20–17	Soldier Field	Bears; 29–17–2	
1992	Giants; 27–14	Soldier Field	Bears; 29–18–2	
1993	Giants; 26–20	Soldier Field	Bears; 29–19–2	
1995	Bears; 27–24	Giants Stadium	Bears; 30–19–2	

2000s (Tied, 2–2)

Season	Results	Location	Overall series	Notes
2000	Giants; 14–7	Soldier Field	Bears; 30–20–2	Giants lose Super Bowl XXXV.
2004	Bears; 28–21	Giants Stadium	Bears; 31–20–2	
2006	Bears; 38–20	Giants Stadium	Bears; 32–20–2	Final meeting at Giants Stadium. Bears lose Super Bowl XLI.
2007	Giants; 21–16	Soldier Field	Bears; 32–21–2	Giants win Super Bowl XLII.

2010s (Giants, 3–2)

Season	Results	Location	Overall series	Notes
2010	Giants; 17–3	MetLife Stadium	Bears; 32–22–2	First meeting at MetLife Stadium.
2013	Bears; 27–21	Soldier Field	Bears; 33–22–2	
2016	Giants; 22–16	MetLife Stadium	Bears; 33–23–2	
2018	Giants; 30–27(OT)	MetLife Stadium	Bears; 33–24–2	
2019	Bears; 19–14	Soldier Field	Bears; 34–24–2	

2020s (Bears, 3–1)

Season	Results	Location	Overall series	Notes
2020	Bears; 17–13	Soldier Field	Bears; 35–24–2	No fans in attendance for game due to COVID-19 pandemic.
2021	Bears; 29–3	Soldier Field	Bears; 36–24–2	Bears hold Giants to -10 net passing yards, the worst in team history. Giants coach Joe Judge goes on epic 11-minute rant in postgame interview.
2022	Giants; 20–12	MetLife Stadium	Bears; 36–25–2	
2025	Bears; 24–20	Soldier Field	Bears; 37–25–2	Bears overcame a 20–10 fourth-quarter deficit in the final six minutes. Giants fire coach Brian Daboll after game.

Summary of results

Season	Season series	at Chicago Bears	at New York Giants	Notes
Regular season	Bears 32–22–2	Bears 17–11	Bears 15–11–2	
Postseason	Bears 5–3	Bears 4–0	Giants 3–1	NFL Championship Game: 1933, 1934, 1941, 1946, 1956, 1963; NFC Divisional: 1985, 1990
Regular and postseason	Bears 37–25–2	Bears 21–11	Bears 16–14–2	

== Players who played for both teams ==
Name	Pos.	Years with Bears	Years with Giants
Prince Amukamara	CB	2017–2019	2011–2015
Martellus Bennett	TE	2013–2015	2012
Zack Bowman	CB	2008–2011, 2012–2013	2014
Dave Duerson	S	1983–1989	1990
Mike Glennon	QB	2017	2021
Robbie Gould	K	2005–2015	2016
Brandon Marshall	WR	2012–2014	2017
Brad Maynard	P	2001–2010	1997–2000
Bennie McRae	CB	1962–1970	1971
Alec Ogletree	LB	2021	2018–2019
Antrel Rolle	CB	2015	2010–2014

== See also ==
- National Football League rivalries
- Bulls–Knicks rivalry
