= 1985 Los Angeles Raiders season =

NFL team season

- Owner: Al Davis
- General manager: Al Davis
- Head coach: Tom Flores
- Home stadium: Los Angeles Memorial Coliseum

Results
- Record: 12–4
- Division place: 1st AFC West
- Playoffs: Lost Divisional Playoffs (vs. Patriots) 20–27
- All-Pros: 4: TE Todd Christensen; CB Mike Haynes; DE Howie Long; RB Marcus Allen
- Pro Bowlers: 4: TE Todd Christensen; CB Mike Haynes; DE Howie Long; RB Marcus Allen

The 1985 Los Angeles Raiders season was their 26th in the league. They improved upon their previous season's 11–5 record, winning 12 games. The team qualified for the playoffs for the fourth straight season. Two close victories over Denver towards the end of the year gave Los Angeles the division title, while Denver missed the playoffs despite an 11–5 record. In the AFC Divisional Playoffs, the Raiders lost 27–20 to the New England Patriots.

== Before the season ==
=== Draft ===
1985 Los Angeles Raiders draft
| Round | Pick | Player | Position | College | Notes |
| 1 | 23 | Jessie Hester | WR | Florida State | |
| 3 | 79 | Tim Moffett | WR | Ole Miss | |
| 3 | 80 | Stefon Adams | DB | East Carolina | Played for Raiders in 1986–89 |
| 4 | 107 | Jamie Kimmel | LB | Syracuse | Played for Raiders in 1986–87 |
| 5 | 135 | Dan Reeder | RB | Delaware | |
| 6 | 143 | Rusty Hilger | QB | Oklahoma State | |
| 7 | 186 | Kevin Belcher | T | Wisconsin | |
| 7 | 188 | Mark Pattison | WR | Washington | |
| 7 | 191 | Bret Clark | DB | Nebraska | |
| 7 | 192 | Nick Haden | G | Penn State | |
| 8 | 220 | Leonard Wingate | DT | South Carolina State | |
| 9 | 246 | Chris Sydnor | DB | Penn State | |
| 10 | 275 | Reggie McKenzie | LB | Tennessee | |
| 10 | 276 | Albert Myres | DB | Tulsa | |
| 11 | 303 | Steve Strachan | RB | Boston College | |
| 12 | 332 | Raymond Polk | DB | Oklahoma State | |
Made roster

== Personnel ==
=== Staff ===
1985 Los Angeles Raiders staff
| Front office: Owner – Al Davis; General Manager – Al Davis; Director of Football Operations – Steve Ortmayer; Head coaches: Head Coach – Tom Flores; Offensive coaches: Quarterbacks – Larry Kennan; Quarterbacks – Tom Walsh; Running Backs – Ray Willsey; Assistant Running Backs – Terry Robiskie; Wide Receivers – Tom Walsh; Tight Ends – Bob Mischak; Offensive Line – Sam Boghosian; Offensive Line – Art Shell | Defensive coaches: Defensive Line – Earl Leggett; Linebackers – Bob Zeman; Defensive Backs – Chet Franklin; Defensive Backs – Willie Brown; Special teams coaches: Special Teams – Steve Ortmayer |

=== Roster ===
1985 Los Angeles Raiders roster
| Quarterbacks (QB): 12 Rusty Hilger; 6 Marc Wilson; Running backs (RB): 32 Marcus Allen; 27 Frank Hawkins; 31 Derrick Jensen; 33 Kenny King; Wide receivers (WR): 21 Cliff Branch; 84 Jessie Hester; 83 Tim Moffett; 85 Dokie Williams; Tight ends (TE): 46 Todd Christensen; 87 Trey Junkin; 81 Andy Parker | Offensive linemen (OL): 50 Dave Dalby C; 79 Bruce Davis T; 73 Charley Hannah G; 74 Shelby Jordan T; 70 Henry Lawrence T; 60 Curt Marsh G; 65 Mickey Marvin G; 72 Don Mosebar C; Defensive linemen (DL): 94 Elvis Franks DE; 99 Sean Jones DE; 75 Howie Long DE; 71 Bill Pickel NT; 93 Greg Townsend DE; 98 Mitch Willis NT | Linebackers (LB): 56 Jeff Barnes OLB; 53 Rod Martin OLB; 54 Reggie McKenzie ILB; 55 Matt Millen ILB; 57 Jerry Robinson ILB; 58 Jack Squirek ILB; 91 Brad Van Pelt OLB; Defensive backs (DB): 45 James Davis CB; 36 Mike Davis SS; 37 Lester Hayes CB; 22 Mike Haynes CB; 26 Vann McElroy FS; 23 Odis McKinney FS; 43 Sam Seale CB; 30 Stacey Toran SS; Special teams (ST): 10 Chris Bahr K; 8 Ray Guy P; 41 Fulton Walker RS | Reserve: 44 Stefon Adams CB (IR); 77 Lyle Alzado DE (IR); 88 Rod Barksdale WR (IR); 62 Nick Haden C (IR); 18 Russ Jensen QB (IR); 59 Jamie Kimmel LB (IR); 28 Cleo Montgomery WR (IR); 51 Bob Nelson LB (IR); 89 Mark Pattison WR (IR); 16 Jim Plunkett QB (IR); 86 Jim Smith WR (IR); 39 Steve Strachan RB (IR); 68 Randy Van Divier T (IR); Rookies in italics |

== Schedule ==
| Week | Date | Opponent | Result | Record | Venue | Attendance | Recap |
|---|---|---|---|---|---|---|---|
| 1 | September 8 | New York Jets | **W** 31–0 | 1–0 | Los Angeles Memorial Coliseum | 57,123 | Recap |
| 2 | September 12 | at **Kansas City Chiefs** | **L** 20–36 | 1–1 | Arrowhead Stadium | 72,686 | Recap |
| 3 | September 22 | San Francisco 49ers | **L** 10–34 | 1–2 | Los Angeles Memorial Coliseum | 87,006 | Recap |
| 4 | September 29 | at New England Patriots | **W** 35–20 | 2–2 | Sullivan Stadium | 60,686 | Recap |
| 5 | October 6 | **Kansas City Chiefs** | **W** 19–0 | 3–2 | Los Angeles Memorial Coliseum | 55,133 | Recap |
| 6 | October 13 | New Orleans Saints | **W** 23–13 | 4–2 | Los Angeles Memorial Coliseum | 48,152 | Recap |
| 7 | October 20 | at Cleveland Browns | **W** 21–20 | 5–2 | Cleveland Municipal Stadium | 77,928 | Recap |
| 8 | October 28 | **San Diego Chargers** | **W** 34–21 | 6–2 | Los Angeles Memorial Coliseum | 69,297 | Recap |
| 9 | November 3 | at **Seattle Seahawks** | **L** 3–33 | 6–3 | Kingdome | 64,060 | Recap |
| 10 | November 10 | at **San Diego Chargers** | **L** 34–40 (OT) | 6–4 | Jack Murphy Stadium | 58,566 | Recap |
| 11 | November 17 | Cincinnati Bengals | **W** 13–6 | 7–4 | Los Angeles Memorial Coliseum | 52,501 | Recap |
| 12 | November 24 | **Denver Broncos** | **W** 31–28 (OT) | 8–4 | Los Angeles Memorial Coliseum | 63,161 | Recap |
| 13 | December 1 | at Atlanta Falcons | **W** 34–24 | 9–4 | Atlanta–Fulton County Stadium | 20,858 | Recap |
| 14 | December 8 | at **Denver Broncos** | **W** 17–14 (OT) | 10–4 | Mile High Stadium | 75,042 | Recap |
| 15 | December 15 | **Seattle Seahawks** | **W** 13–3 | 11–4 | Los Angeles Memorial Coliseum | 77,425 | Recap |
| 16 | December 23 | at Los Angeles Rams | **W** 16–6 | 12–4 | Anaheim Stadium | 66,676 | Recap |
Note: Intra-division opponents are in **bold** text.

== Playoffs ==
| Round | Date | Opponent (seed) | Result | Venue | Attendance | Recap |
|---|---|---|---|---|---|---|
| Divisional | January 5, 1986 | New England Patriots (5) | L 20–27 | Los Angeles Memorial Coliseum | 88,936 | Recap |

== Season summary ==
=== Week 1 ===
| Team | 1 | 2 | 3 | 4 | Total |
|---|---|---|---|---|---|
| Jets | 0 | 0 | 0 | 0 | 0 |
| • Raiders | 7 | 14 | 7 | 3 | 31 |

- Date: September 8
- Location: Los Angeles Memorial Coliseum, Los Angeles, California
- Game start: 1:00 p.m.
- Game attendance: 57,123
- Game weather: 69 °F (21 °C), wind 12 mph (19 km/h)
- Referee: Tom Dooley
- TV announcers (NBC): Dick Enberg and Merlin Olsen

Scoring summary
| Q1 | 1:03 | LA | Allen 1 yard run (Bahr kick) | LA 7–0 |
| Q2 | 12:10 | LA | D. Williams 14 yard pass from Plunkett (Bahr kick) | LA 14–0 |
| Q2 | 5:08 | LA | Allen 3 yard run (Bahr kick) | LA 21–0 |
| Q3 | 11:38 | LA | Toran 70 yard interception return (Bahr kick) | Raiders 28–0 |
| Q4 | 8:29 | LA | Bahr 20 yard field goal | LA 31–0 |

- Dokie Williams 5 Rec, 131 Yds

=== Week 10 at Chargers ===
Week Ten: Los Angeles Raiders at San Diego Chargers – Game summary

| Quarter | 1 | 2 | 3 | 4 | OT | Total |
|---|---|---|---|---|---|---|
| Raiders | 7 | 6 | 14 | 7 | 0 | 34 |
| Chargers | 7 | 3 | 10 | 14 | 6 | 40 |

at Jack Murphy Stadium, San Diego, California

- Date: November 10
- Game time: 1:00 p.m. PST
- Game weather: 61 °F (16 °C), relative humidity 56%, wind 10 mph (16 km/h)
- Game attendance: 58,566
- Referee: Red Cashion
- TV announcers (NBC): Don Criqui and Bob Trumpy
- Box score

Game information

First quarter

- SDG – Wes Chandler 10-yard pass from Dan Fouts (Bob Thomas kick), 4:29. Chargers 7–0. Drive: 2 plays, 16 yards, 0:43.
- RAI – Jessie Hester 35-yard pass from Marc Wilson (Chris Bahr kick), 3:03. Tied 7–7. Drive: 6 plays, 80 yards, 1:26.

Second quarter

- SDG – Bob Thomas 34-yard field goal, 10:11. Chargers 10–7. Drive: 7 plays, 24 yards, 3:07.
- RAI – Frank Hawkins 1-yard run (kick blocked), 1:57. Raiders 13–10. Drive: 4 plays, 32 yards, 1:30.

Third quarter

- SDG – Bob Thomas 23-yard field goal, 11:32. Tied 13–13. Drive: 9 plays, 61 yards, 3:28.
- RAI – Marcus Allen 1-yard run (Chris Bahr kick), 7:11. Raiders 20–13. Drive: 9 plays, 66 yards, 4:21.
- SDG – Lionel James 34-yard pass from Dan Fouts (Bob Thomas kick), 3:08. Tied 20–20. Drive: 8 plays, 80 yards, 4:03.
- RAI – Jessie Hester 54-yard pass from Marc Wilson (Chris Bahr kick), 0:59. Raiders 27–20. Drive: 5 plays, 75 yards, 2:09.

Fourth quarter

- SDG – Gary Anderson 21-yard pass from Dan Fouts (Bob Thomas kick), 7:07. Tied 27–27. Drive: 10 plays, 79 yards, 5:07.
- RAI – Todd Christensen 24-yard pass from Marc Wilson (Chris Bahr kick), 1:49. Raiders 34–27 Drive: 12 plays, 84 yards, 5:18.
- SDG – Charlie Joiner 14-yard pass from Dan Fouts (Bob Thomas kick), 0:53. Tied 34–34. Drive: 5 plays, 71 yards, 0:56.

Overtime

- SDG – Lionel James 17-yard run, 11:16. Chargers 40–34. Drive: 7 plays, 80 yards, 3:44.

Top passers

- RAI – Marc Wilson – 18/32, 297 yards, 3 TD, 2 INT
- SDG – Dan Fouts – 26/41, 436 yards, 4 TD, INT

Top rushers

- RAI – Marcus Allen – 28 rushes, 119 yards, TD
- SDG – Gary Anderson – 16 rushes, 70 yards

Top receivers

- RAI – Todd Christensen – 7 receptions, 112 yards, TD
- SDG – Lionel James – 11 receptions, 168 yards, TD

=== Week 14 at Broncos ===
Week 14: Los Angeles Raiders (9–4) at Denver Broncos (9–4)

| Quarter | 1 | 2 | 3 | 4 | OT | Total |
|---|---|---|---|---|---|---|
| Raiders | 0 | 0 | 14 | 0 | 3 | 17 |
| Broncos | 7 | 7 | 0 | 0 | 0 | 14 |

at Mile High Stadium, Denver, Colorado

- Date: December 8
- Game time: 4:00 p.m. EST
- Game weather: 31 °F (−1 °C)
- Game attendance: 75,042
- Referee: Fred Wyant
- TV announcers (NBC): Dick Enberg and Merlin Olsen
- Box Score, Box Score

Game information

First quarter

- DEN – James Wright 5-yard pass from John Elway (Rich Karlis kick), 1:27. Broncos 7–0. Drive:

Second quarter

- DEN – Sammy Winder 1-yard run (Rich Karlis kick), 0:30. Broncos 14–0. Drive:

Third quarter

- LA – Todd Christensen 3-yard pass from Marc Wilson (Chris Bahr kick), 8:31. Broncos 14–7. Drive:
- LA – Marcus Allen 15–yard run (Chris Bahr kick), 4:45. Tie 14–14. Drive:

Fourth quarter

- No scoring

Overtime

- LA – Chris Bahr 26-yard field goal, 10:05. Raiders 17–14. Drive:

Top passers

- LA – Marc Wilson – 13/28, 93 yards, TD, 4 INT
- DEN – John Elway – 18/36, 158 yards, TD, 3 INT

Top rushers

- LA – Marcus Allen – 25 rushes, 135 yards, TD
- DEN – Sammy Winder – 14 rushes, 41 yards, TD

Top receivers

- LA – Todd Christensen – 6 receptions, 53 yards, TD
- DEN – Steve Watson – 5 receptions, 56 yards

== Standings ==
AFC West
| | W | L | T | PCT | DIV | CONF | PF | PA | STK |
|---|---|---|---|---|---|---|---|---|---|
| ^{(1)} Los Angeles Raiders | 12 | 4 | 0 | .750 | 5–3 | 9–3 | 354 | 308 | W6 |
| Denver Broncos | 11 | 5 | 0 | .688 | 5–3 | 8–4 | 380 | 329 | W2 |
| Seattle Seahawks | 8 | 8 | 0 | .500 | 4–4 | 6–6 | 349 | 303 | L2 |
| San Diego Chargers | 8 | 8 | 0 | .500 | 3–5 | 7–7 | 467 | 435 | L1 |
| Kansas City Chiefs | 6 | 10 | 0 | .375 | 3–5 | 4–8 | 317 | 360 | W1 |

== MVP ==
Running Back Marcus Allen earned the 1985 league MVP with Walter Payton of the Chicago Bears finishing as the runner-up. Allen started all 16 games and caught 67 passes for 2,314 total yards (1,759 rushing yards) and 14 total touchdowns (11 rushing touchdowns). His longest run was 61 yards, his longest reception was 44 yards, and he ran for 4.6 yards per carry. He also completed 1 of 2 passes for 16 yards for zero touchdowns.

== Pro Bowlers ==
The 1985 Raiders had four players make it to the Pro Bowl. They were Marcus Allen, Todd Christensen, Mike Haynes, and Howie Long.
