= Tony Franklin (kicker) =

American football player (born 1956)

No. 1
- Position: Placekicker

Personal information
- Born: November 18, 1956 (age 69); Big Spring, Texas, U.S.
- Listed height: 5 ft 8 in (1.73 m)
- Listed weight: 182 lb (83 kg)

Career information
- High school: Arlington Heights (Fort Worth, Texas)
- College: Texas A&M
- NFL draft: 1979: 3rd round, 74th overall pick

Career history
- Philadelphia Eagles (1979–1983); New England Patriots (1984–1987); Miami Dolphins (1988)

Awards and highlights
- Second-team All-Pro (1986); Pro Bowl (1986); NFL scoring leader (1986); PFWA All-Rookie Team (1979); New England Patriots All-1980s Team; First-team All-American (1978); 2× First-team All-SWC (1976, 1978)

Career NFL statistics
- Field goals made: 177
- Field goal attempts: 264
- Field goal %: 67
- Longest field goal: 59
- Stats at Pro Football Reference

Anthony Ray Franklin (born November 18, 1956) is an American former professional football player who was a kicker in the National Football League (NFL) from 1979 to 1988 for the Philadelphia Eagles, the New England Patriots, and the Miami Dolphins. Franklin was best known for his barefoot kicking style, which led to his nickname "the Barefoot Kicker". He played college football for the Texas A&M Aggies.

== College career ==
While also offered scholarships at New Mexico State and Texas Christian University, Franklin accepted the “full ride” college football scholarship offered by Head Coach Emory Bellard at Texas A&M University.

He set the record for the longest field goal in modern college football history when he made a kick of 65 yards on October 16, 1976, against Baylor. For a brief period, this was tied for the overall record for all of American college football with J. T. Haxall of Princeton University, having made a 65-yard kick in 1882, but it did not last as Ove Johansson of Abilene Christian University, which at the time was a member of National Association of Intercollegiate Athletics (NAIA), made a 69-yard field goal on the same day. Franklin's NCAA record only lasted until 1977, when both Russell Erxleben and Steve Little made 67-yard field goals, and he has since been passed by two other men and tied by Martín Gramática. However, Franklin set a record by kicking a 64-yard field goal in the same game, which made him the only kicker in NCAA history to connect on two field goals of sixty or more yards in the same game.

Franklin finished his collegiate career breaking 18 NCAA records at the time, including most career field goals (56), career kick scoring (291 points), most field goals of 50 yards or longer in a career (16), most field goals made in a three-year career (45) and longest average for field goals made in a career (39.5 yards). He was a consensus All-American pick as a sophomore in 1976 and earned All-American honors again as a senior in 1978. He was a Second-team All-America selection as a junior, in 1977.

He is listed as a "Legend of the Sun Bowl" by the Sun Bowl Association for his 63-yard field goal against Florida in the January 1977 Sun Bowl. He is also a member of the Sun Bowl's 75th Anniversary All-Sun Bowl Team.

== Professional career ==
Franklin was drafted by the Philadelphia Eagles in the third round of the 1979 NFL draft. He was credited with the fourth longest field goal (at the time) in NFL history during his rookie year with the Eagles, a 59-yarder at Dallas on November 12, 1979. Franklin played in Super Bowl XV and kicked a 30-yard field goal.

On February 21, 1984, Franklin was traded to the New England Patriots for a sixth-round draft choice in the 1985 NFL draft. He led the NFL in scoring (140 points) and field goals made (32) in 1986 and was selected to represent the AFC in the Pro Bowl. He played in Super Bowl XX and kicked a 36-yard field goal, the first points scored in the 46–10 loss. The 32 field goals he made in 1986 was a Patriots single-season franchise record until Stephen Gostkowski broke the record in 2008. After being cut by New England, Franklin was out of football until 1988, when an injury crisis led the Miami Dolphins to sign him. Unfortunately, Franklin's time with the Dolphins was highlighted by a disastrous game against his former team where he missed three field goals (including a 23-yarder) and the Patriots ended Miami's playoff hopes with a 6–3 road win. Franklin was cut after that and never played another game in the NFL.

== Career regular season statistics ==
Career high/best bold

Season	Team	G	FGM	FGA	%	LNG	XPM	XPA	%	PTS
1979	PHI	16	23	31	74.2	59	36	39	92.3	105
1980	PHI	16	16	31	51.6	51	48	48	100.0	96
1981	PHI	16	20	31	64.5	50	41	43	95.3	101
1982	PHI	9	6	9	66.7	47	23	25	92.0	41
1983	PHI	16	15	26	57.7	52	24	27	88.9	69
1984	NE	16	22	28	78.6	48	42	42	100.0	108
1985	NE	16	24	30	80.0	50	40	41	97.6	112
1986	NE	16	32	41	78.0	49	44	45	97.8	140
1987	NE	14	15	26	57.7	50	37	38	97.4	82
1988	MIA	5	4	11	36.4	51	6	7	85.7	18
Career		140	177	264	67.0	59	341	355	96.1	872
