= Clarence Weathers =

American football player (born 1962)

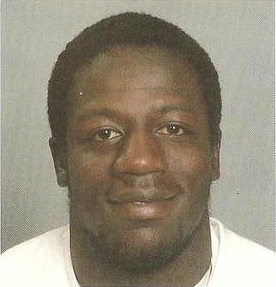

No. 82, 85, 80, 87
- Position: Wide receiver

Personal information
- Born: January 10, 1962 (age 64); Greenville, South Carolina, U.S.
- Listed height: 5 ft 9 in (1.75 m)
- Listed weight: 170 lb (77 kg)

Career information
- High school: Fort Pierce Westwood (Fort Pierce, Florida)
- College: Delaware State
- NFL draft: 1983: undrafted

Career history
- New England Patriots (1983–1984); Cleveland Browns (1985–1988); Indianapolis Colts (1989); Kansas City Chiefs (1989); Green Bay Packers (1990–1991)

Career NFL statistics
- Receptions: 160
- Receiving yards: 2,426
- Receiving touchdowns: 12
- Stats at Pro Football Reference

Clarence Weathers (born January 10, 1962) is an American former professional football player who was a wide receiver in the National Football League (NFL). He played college football for the Delaware State Hornets. Weathers played nine seasons in the NFL for the New England Patriots (1983–1984), Cleveland Browns (1985–1988), Indianapolis Colts (1989), Kansas City Chiefs (1989), and Green Bay Packers (1990–1991). His brother, Robert, also played in the NFL.

== NFL career statistics ==
Legend
**Bold**	Career high

=== Regular season ===
Year	Team	Games		Receiving				
Year	Team	GP	GS	Rec	Yds	Avg	Lng	TD
1983	NWE	**16**	0	19	379	19.9	58	**3**
1984	NWE	9	0	8	115	14.4	29	2
1985	CLE	13	**7**	16	**449**	**28.1**	**72**	**3**
1986	CLE	**16**	0	9	100	11.1	16	0
1987	CLE	12	0	11	153	13.9	37	2
1988	CLE	**16**	6	29	436	15.0	49	1
1989	IND	4	0	6	62	10.3	19	0
1989	KAN	11	0	17	192	11.3	27	0
1990	GNB	14	0	**33**	390	11.8	29	1
1991	GNB	14	0	12	150	12.5	22	0
		125	13	160	2,426	15.2	72	12

=== Playoffs ===
Year	Team	Games		Receiving				
Year	Team	GP	GS	Rec	Yds	Avg	Lng	TD
1985	CLE	1	1	1	12	12.0	12	0
1986	CLE	**2**	0	**2**	**45**	**22.5**	**42**	0
1987	CLE	**2**	0	**2**	24	12.0	19	0
1988	CLE	1	0	**2**	27	13.5	18	0
		6	1	7	108	15.4	42	0
