= Craig James (running back) =

American football player and broadcaster (born 1961)

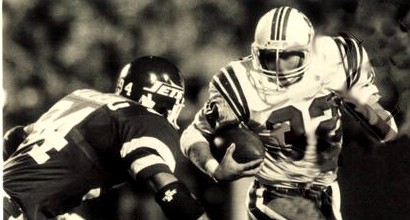
- James (right) playing for the Patriots in 1985

No. 32
- Position: Running back

Personal information
- Born: January 2, 1961 (age 65); Jacksonville, Texas, U.S.
- Listed height: 6 ft 0 in (1.83 m)
- Listed weight: 215 lb (98 kg)

Career information
- High school: Stratford (Houston, Texas)
- College: SMU (1979–1982)
- NFL draft: 1983: 7th round, 187th overall pick

Career history
- Washington Federals (1983–1984); New England Patriots (1984–1988)

Awards and highlights
- Pro Bowl (1985); New England Patriots All-1980s Team; Third-team All-American (1982); SWC Offensive Newcomer of the Year (1979); 3× First-team All-SWC (1980–1982)

Career NFL statistics
- Rushing attempts: 585
- Rushing yards: 2,469
- Rushing touchdowns: 11
- Receptions: 81
- Receiving yards: 819
- Receiving touchdowns: 2
- Stats at Pro Football Reference

Jesse Craig James (born January 2, 1961) is an American former professional football player and sports commentator. He was a running back for the New England Patriots of the National Football League (NFL) and for the Washington Federals of the United States Football League (USFL). He then became a commentator for the ABC and ESPN television networks. James ran for a seat in the U.S. Senate in Texas in 2012, but lost in the first round of the Republican primary.

== Early life ==
James was born in Jacksonville, Texas, in 1961 and grew up in the Houston area. When he was in the first grade, his parents divorced and he moved with his mother and brother (former Major League Baseball player Chris James) to Pasadena, Texas. James has talked about growing up witnessing his mother being abused and struggling financially to support her sons.

James attended Stratford High School in Houston, where he was a star running back on their 1978 Texas class 4A championship football team, setting the single-season Texas 4A rushing record with 2,411 yards gained in 15 games. James also played on his high school baseball team and was offered a contract by the New York Yankees out of high school to play first base in the minor leagues, but chose to pursue a football career instead.

== College career ==
James was heavily recruited out of high school and decided to attend Southern Methodist University in Dallas, Texas. James stated that he decided on SMU because his girlfriend at the time (and future wife), Marilyn, was already a freshman student there. Parade's national high school running back of the year, Eric Dickerson, as well as a large number of blue-chip recruits, also signed with SMU in 1979. The star running-back tandem was known as "The Pony Express", and the tandem would alternate possessions throughout their four-year careers at SMU.

In his freshman year in 1979, James proved more reliable than Dickerson, outgaining him 761 yards to 477, and was named the Southwest Conference's Offensive Newcomer of the Year. In the 1980 Holiday Bowl (later known as the "Miracle Bowl"), James ran for 225 rushing yards and 9.9 yards/carry in a losing effort, records that stood for 13 and 15 years respectively.

Though the pair continued to alternate possessions at tailback, by 1982 Dickerson had established himself as the featured back, as he carried 232 times for 1,617 yards while James carried 197 times for 938 yards. James took over punting duties midway through the season after the regular punter was injured, and finished sixth in the nation in punting. That year, he also scored on a 96-yard touchdown reception to set a record as the longest scoring play in Southwest Conference history.

James played on the 1981 SMU team that won the Southwest Conference title while being on NCAA probation as a result of recruiting violations dating back to the mid-1970s. In later years, SMU was further caught up in the Southern Methodist University football scandal, which involved payments to players in the 1983 recruiting class, with such payments improperly continuing while SMU was again on probation in 1985 and 1986. As a result of the repeated violations, SMU received the "death penalty" from the NCAA, shutting down the program in 1987 and 1988. Neither James' recruitment nor his participation in the SMU football program was cited by the NCAA in levying sanctions against SMU.

In 2012, James admitted to having received what he called "an insignificant amount" of improper gifts while playing at SMU. He has always denied that improper financial inducements had anything to do with his decision to attend SMU.

== Professional career ==
=== Washington Federals ===
After his senior season, James was drafted by the Washington Federals of the USFL with the fourth overall pick in the spring league's inaugural draft in 1983. James signed with the Federals for a series of four guaranteed one-year deals. He stated that he decided to join the USFL rather than the NFL because of a desire to be a "pioneer" in a new league, similar to what he and Dickerson did at SMU. Despite already having been signed to the Federals, the New England Patriots, who were coached by James' former SMU coach Ron Meyer, drafted the rights to James in the seventh round of the 1983 NFL draft.

James' first pro season in Washington saw the Federals struggle to a 4–10 record. He started all 14 games and rushed for 823 yards and four touchdowns, and caught 40 passes out of the backfield. The following year, James suffered a knee injury on March 4, 1984, in a home game against the Philadelphia Stars. He was placed on injured reserve later that week. James was released by the cash-strapped Federals a month later, allowing him to join the Patriots for their training camp in August.

=== New England Patriots ===
In James' first year with the Patriots in the 1984 season, he was initially a backup to Tony Collins under his old coach Meyer. When Meyer was fired after a 5–3 start to the season, new coach Raymond Berry made James the starting running back, and James finished the year as the Patriots' leading rusher with 790 yards.

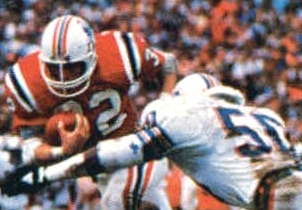
Craig James (left) rushes the ball past the Dolphins' defense in the 1985–86 AFC Championship game.

In the 1985 season, James started at running back all season, rushing for 1,227 yards, and was selected for the Pro Bowl. In Week 2 against the Chicago Bears, he caught a 90-yard touchdown pass from Tony Eason, which was the longest touchdown from scrimmage in Patriots history at the time. He was a major factor in the Patriots' 31–14 upset win over the Miami Dolphins in the AFC title game, rushing for a career postseason high of 105 yards. However, he was dominated by the Chicago Bears' defense in Super Bowl XX, which held him to only one yard on five carries.

James struggled to continue his Pro Bowl form in the 1986 season, finishing with just 427 yards on 154 carries. At the end of the year, he had surgery to repair his right shoulder after suffering from recurrent dislocations during the year. James returned for the start of the 1987 season, but got just three carries in the first two games before being shut down with another shoulder injury.

After gaining 15 yards on four carries and 14 catches for 171 yards in the first six games of the 1988 season, James suffered from posterior shoulder dislocations and underwent surgery in October, missing the remainder of the season. He retired from the NFL after the 1988 season, having rushed for 2,469 yards and eleven touchdowns in his five seasons with the Patriots. He also had 819 receiving yards and two touchdown catches, and completed three of six pass attempts, with all three completions going for touchdowns.

In 2009, James was included in the New England Patriots All-1980s team that was selected by local media and team figures to commemorate the team's 50th anniversary.

== NFL career statistics ==
Legend
**Bold**	Career high

=== Regular season ===
Year	Team	Games		Rushing							Receiving						
Year	Team	GP	GS	Att	Yds	Avg	Lng	TD	A/G	Y/G	Rec	Yds	Avg	Lng	TD	R/G	Y/G
1984	NE	15	7	160	790	**4.9**	**73**	1	10.7	52.7	22	159	7.2	16	0	1.5	10.6
1985	NE	16	14	**263**	**1,227**	4.7	65	**5**	**16.4**	**76.7**	**27**	**360**	**13.3**	**90**	**2**	1.7	22.5
1986	NE	13	12	154	427	2.8	16	4	11.8	32.8	18	129	7.2	17	0	1.4	9.9
1987	NE	2	0	4	10	2.5	5	0	2.0	5.0	—	—	—	—	0	—	—
1988	NE	6	0	4	15	3.8	8	1	0.7	2.5	14	171	12.2	32	0	**2.3**	**28.5**
Career		52	33	585	2,469	4.2	73	11	11.3	47.5	81	819	10.1	90	2	1.6	15.8

=== Postseason ===
Year	Team	Games		Rushing							Receiving						
Year	Team	GP	GS	Att	Yds	Avg	Lng	TD	A/G	Y/G	Rec	Yds	Avg	Lng	TD	R/G	Y/G
1985	NE	4	4	**72**	**259**	**3.6**	16	**1**	**18.0**	**64.8**	**6**	**90**	**15.0**	**24**	0	**1.5**	**22.5**
1986	NE	1	0	10	31	3.1	**17**	0	10.0	31.0	–	–	–	–	–	–	–
Career		5	4	82	290	3.5	17	1	16.4	58.0	6	90	15.0	24	0	1.5	22.5

== Radio and television career ==
After his retirement from play in 1989, James went on to become a radio analyst for SMU college football games, then was the sports anchor for KDFW-TV. During this time, he also appeared on ESPN as a studio analyst on the College GameDay and College Football Scoreboard programs. James worked with Lee Corso, who gave him the nickname "Mustang Breath". In 1996, James joined CBS, where he served as a studio analyst on College Football Today as well as The NFL Today programs before becoming a game analyst on NFL on CBS. During his CBS stint, he served as a reporter during the NCAA men's basketball championship as well as the 1998 Winter Olympics. In 2003, James moved to ABC. He served as a studio analyst on the network's college football coverage through the 2008 season. James also appeared as an analyst on ESPN's Thursday-night package as well as other college football programs such as College Football Live. He then teamed with Mike Patrick and sideline reporter Heather Cox as game analyst for the 2009 season, working ESPN on ABC Saturday afternoon broadcasts, while still working the Thursday-night package. On December 19, 2011, James announced that he was leaving ESPN to run for the United States Senate.

James operates his own broadcasting school, the Craig James School of Broadcasting.

James said in 1998 that the Wisconsin Badgers were "the worst team to ever play in the Rose Bowl," but Wisconsin went on to defeat #6 UCLA 38–31 in the 1999 Rose Bowl. Afterward, Badgers coach Barry Alvarez fired back: "Well, I know we're at least the second worst."

James is a voter in the AP college football poll, and has received some attention and criticism for his reported tendency to award low votes to teams from outside the Power Five conferences, such as Boise State and TCU.

On August 30, 2013, Fox Sports Southwest announced that it had hired James as a college football analyst and co-host of the network's college football studio show. On September 2, after only one appearance, the network abruptly cut ties with James before he had formally signed a contract. Reportedly, Fox Sports officials were displeased that James' hire had not been vetted. Additionally, The Dallas Morning News reported that Fox Sports officials were upset with statements against same-sex marriage that James had made during his Senate run. On February 25, 2014, the First Liberty Institute filed suit on James' behalf against Fox, claiming that he was fired for his religious beliefs. Also in 2014, James joined the Family Research Council as assistant to president Tony Perkins, intending to "fight the kind of 'religious bigotry' [James] blames for his firing by Fox."

== Texas Tech controversy ==
James's son Adam was the center of a controversy that resulted in Texas Tech suspending, and later firing, head football coach Mike Leach shortly before the 2010 Alamo Bowl. Leach had allegedly forced Adam to stand in a shed for two hours during practice on two occasions. In response, Adam went to university chancellor Kent Hance and members of the board of trustees with his accusations. In light of the allegations, ESPN removed Craig from announcing the Alamo Bowl, replacing him with Bob Davie. In a lawsuit filed by Leach against Texas Tech, he alleges that Adam "voluntarily placed himself into the electrical closet and apparently took pictures with his phone camera." In response, James stated, "Since the James family is not a party to the lawsuit, we deem it inappropriate to discuss it."

Leach later filed suit against James and others for defamation and wrongful termination related to the publicity surrounding the incident. In August 2013, Leach's claims were dismissed on summary judgment.

== Politics ==
In an interview with WFAA-TV in Dallas, James revealed that he was interested in getting involved in politics as a member of the Republican Party. James is a self-described conservative and stated that government intervention in business and health care were his main concerns. He founded a political group called Texans for a Better America.

=== 2012 run for U.S. Senate ===
On December 19, 2011, James announced that he would run for the United States Senate as a Republican in 2012 for the seat being vacated by Kay Bailey Hutchison. Public Policy Polling found during the race that "as Craig James has become better known he's just gotten more and more unpopular." During a 2012 debate, James upbraided former Dallas mayor Tom Leppert for attending a gay pride parade, and declared that gays would eventually "answer to the Lord for their actions." Those and other controversial statements subsequently cost him his job at Fox Sports Southwest. On May 29, 2012, he finished a distant fourth out of nine candidates in the Republican primary with 3.6% of the vote.
