= Fred Marion =

American football player (born 1959)

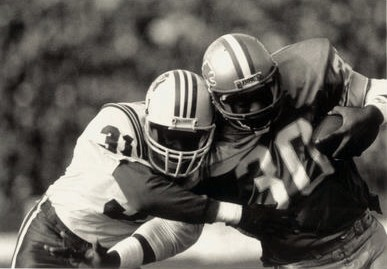
- Marion (left) playing for the Patriots in 1985

No. 31
- Position: Safety

Personal information
- Born: January 2, 1959 (age 67); Gainesville, Florida, U.S.
- Listed height: 6 ft 2 in (1.88 m)
- Listed weight: 192 lb (87 kg)

Career information
- High school: Buchholz (Gainesville)
- College: Miami (FL)
- NFL draft: 1982: 5th round, 112th overall pick

Career history
- New England Patriots (1982–1991)

Awards and highlights
- Pro Bowl (1985); New England Patriots All-1980s Team; New England Patriots 35th Anniversary Team; New England Patriots 50th Anniversary Team; Consensus All-American (1981)

Career NFL statistics
- Interceptions: 29
- Interception yards: 457
- Touchdowns: 1
- Stats at Pro Football Reference

Fred Donald Marion (born January 2, 1959), is an American former professional football player who was a safety for 10 seasons with the New England Patriots of the National Football League (NFL) during the 1980s and 1990s. Marion played college football for the Miami Hurricanes, and was recognized as an All-American. Playing with New England, he was named to the Pro Bowl in 1985.

== Early life and education ==
Marion was born in Gainesville, Florida.

He attended the University of Miami in Coral Gables, Florida, where he played for the Hurricanes from 1978 to 1981. As a senior in 1981, he was a consensus first-team All-American.

== Professional career ==
The New England Patriots selected Marion in the fifth round (112th pick overall) of the 1982 NFL draft, and he played for Patriots from 1982 to 1991. He was a Pro Bowl selection in 1985 when he intercepted seven passes for 189 return yards, helping the Patriots to their first Super Bowl appearance versus the Chicago Bears.

His only career touchdown came in 1986 against Pittsburgh. He intercepted Bubby Brister and ran back a 37-yard score.

== Personal life ==
Marion is the younger brother of former New York Giants linebacker, Frank Marion.
