= Robert Weathers =

American football player (born 1960)

No. 24
- Position: Running back

Personal information
- Born: September 13, 1960 (age 66); Westfield, New York, U.S.
- Listed height: 6 ft 2 in (1.88 m)
- Listed weight: 220 lb (100 kg)

Career information
- High school: Fort Pierce Central (Fort Pierce, Florida)
- College: Arizona State
- NFL draft: 1982: 2nd round, 40th overall pick

Career history
- New England Patriots (1982–1986)

Awards and highlights
- Second-team All-Pac-10 (1981)

Career NFL statistics
- Rushing yards: 733
- Rushing average: 4.6
- Rushing touchdowns: 4
- Stats at Pro Football Reference

Robert James Weathers (born September 13, 1960) is an American former professional football player who was a running back for the New England Patriots of the National Football League (NFL). He played college football for the Arizona State Sun Devils and was selected 40th overall by the Patriots in the second round of the 1982 NFL draft. His brother, Clarence Weathers, also played in the NFL.

== 1982 season ==
Weathers' rookie season saw him post 83 yards rushing in 6 games, starting 2. Tony Collins would handle the majority of the touches in 1982 for the team (as he would throughout Weathers' career), but Weathers still managed to score a touchdown on September 12 at the Baltimore Colts.

== 1983 season ==
Weathers posted 630 total yards from scrimmage during the 1983 season, which included 418 rushing yards and a rushing touchdown, which came on a 9-yard rush against the Baltimore Colts on September 4, 1983.

In 1983, the Patriots would sign Weathers' brother, Clarence Weathers, who would play alongside Robert until the end of Robert's career.

== 1984 season ==
Weathers made only 2 appearances in 1984, making no starts. In total Weathers was only on the active roster for four total games due to an injury to his right knee on a clipping penalty at Miami, which occurred on September 9. Due to this injury, Weathers had and Arthroscopy procedure and ended up placed on IR on September 13. Though he was reactivated on December 8, he recorded no statistics this season.

== 1985 season ==
Weathers finished the 1985 season fourth in rushing, recording 174 yards from scrimmage and a touchdown.

Weathers scored a crucial touchdown against the Cincinnati Bengals in the 1985 season finale at Sullivan Stadium. On fourth-and-one, after the 2-minute-warning, Weathers ran 42 yards to put the Patriots up 34-23 and secure New England an AFC wild-card berth and an 11-5 record.

Weathers recorded 87 yards rushing on 16 attempts, 2 yards receiving on 1 attempt, and a receiving touchdown on January 12, 1986, in the Patriots 31-14 AFC Championship victory over the Miami Dolphins in the Orange Bowl. His 45-yard rush was the longest of the game by any player in the game.

Prior to Super Bowl XX the New England Patriots produced a music video in response to The Super Bowl Shuffle, the Chicago Bears Billboard Hot 100 hit. The Patriots response, "New England, The Patriots and We" failed to chart, however Weathers is featured in the video, delivering the line "run through the wind, for a big T.D."

In Super Bowl XX, Weathers recorded a single carry for 3 yards, and a single reception for 3 yards, in the Patriots 46-10 loss to the Bears.

== 1986 season ==
The 1986 season would prove to be Weathers' final in the NFL. He spent most of the 1986 season on Injured Reserve after suffering ankle injury in car accident during the preseason, which caused him to miss the first three regular season games. He'd post a career-low 58 yards on 21 carries before being placed on IR on November 14, missing the final six games of the season. Weathers would still manage to score a touchdown at Buffalo on October 26.

== See also ==
- List of Arizona State University alumni
- List of New England Patriots players
- List of people from New York
