= Jim Bowman (American football) =

American football player (born 1963)

No. 28
- Position: Defensive back

Personal information
- Born: October 26, 1963 (age 63); Cadillac, Michigan, U.S.
- Listed height: 6 ft 2 in (1.88 m)
- Listed weight: 210 lb (95 kg)

Career information
- High school: Cadillac
- College: Central Michigan
- NFL draft: 1985: 2nd round, 52nd overall pick

Career history
- New England Patriots (1985–1989)

Awards and highlights
- Third-team All-American (1984)

Career NFL statistics
- Interceptions: 3
- Fumble recoveries: 2
- Sacks: 0.5
- Stats at Pro Football Reference

James Edwin Bowman (born October 26, 1963) is an American former professional football player who was a defensive back for five seasons with the New England Patriots of the National Football League (NFL).

== Early life and college ==
Bowman was born and raised in Cadillac, Michigan and attended Cadillac High School. He played college football for the Central Michigan Chippewas, where, as a senior, he was honored by the Associated Press as a third-team All-American.

== Professional career ==
Bowman was selected by the Patriots in the second round of the 1985 NFL draft.

During his rookie year, 1985, in the Divisional Playoff game against the Oakland Raiders, Bowman recovered two fumbles on Special Teams, one which led to a Tony Eason touchdown pass 2 plays later. The second fumble recovery occurred following a Sammy Seale fumble on a kickoff. Mosi Tatupu knocked the ball loose, and it rolled into the end zone where Bowman recovered it for what proved to be the game winning score in a 27–20 Patriots victory.

Bowman also played with the Patriots in Super Bowl XX, a 46–10 loss to the Chicago Bears.
