= Tony Collins (American football) =

American football player (born 1959)

No. 33, 34
- Position: Running back

Personal information
- Born: May 27, 1959 (age 67); Sanford, Florida, U.S.
- Listed height: 5 ft 11 in (1.80 m)
- Listed weight: 208 lb (94 kg)

Career information
- High school: Penn Yan Academy (Penn Yan, New York)
- College: East Carolina
- NFL draft: 1981: 2nd round, 47th overall pick

Career history
- New England Patriots (1981–1987); Indianapolis Colts (1988)*; Miami Dolphins (1990); Orlando Predators (1991); Cincinnati Rockers (1992); Miami Hooters (1993)
- * Offseason or practice squad member only

Awards and highlights
- Pro Bowl (1983); New England Patriots All-1980s Team

Career NFL statistics
- Rushing yards: 4,647
- Rushing average: 3.9
- Rushing touchdowns: 32
- Receptions: 261
- Receiving yards: 2,356
- Receiving touchdowns: 12
- Stats at Pro Football Reference

Career AFL statistics
- Receptions: 78
- Receiving yards: 837
- Receiving touchdowns: 16
- Tackles: 52
- Interceptions: 6
- Stats at ArenaFan.com

Anthony Collins (born May 27, 1959) is an American former professional football player who was a running back in the National Football League (NFL) and the Arena Football League (AFL). He played in Super Bowl XX as a member of the New England Patriots. He played college football at East Carolina University.

== Early life ==
A speedy and powerful runner, Collins first garnered notoriety in high school as a starter on the 1976 New York State Class B Champion Penn Yan Academy Mustangs. He grew up with 15 siblings as one of 16 children.

== NFL ==
Collins attended East Carolina University and was selected in the second round of the 1981 NFL draft by the New England Patriots. Cris Crissy, one of his high school teammates, was also drafted by the Patriots that season. Collins was a Pro Bowl selection in 1983 and he played in Super Bowl XX as a member of the Patriots. He signed with the Indianapolis Colts in 1988, but was suspended for the entire season after failing a drug test. His final year in the NFL was in 1990 with the Miami Dolphins. Collins finished his NFL career with 4,647 rushing yards, 261 receptions for 2,356 yards, and 44 touchdowns in 103 games.

Collins' drug problem began when he became addicted to painkillers after suffering an ankle injury with the Patriots in 1982. After being released from the Dolphins, Collins began using cocaine.

== NFL career statistics ==
Legend
**Bold**	Career high

=== Regular season ===
Year	Team	Games		Rushing					Receiving				
Year	Team	GP	GS	Att	Yds	Avg	Lng	TD	Rec	Yds	Avg	Lng	TD
1981	NWE	**16**	11	204	873	4.3	29	7	26	232	8.9	22	0
1982	NWE	9	9	164	632	3.9	**54**	1	19	187	9.8	33	2
1983	NWE	**16**	**16**	**219**	**1,049**	**4.8**	50	**10**	27	257	9.5	20	0
1984	NWE	**16**	5	138	550	4.0	21	5	16	100	6.3	19	0
1985	NWE	**16**	**16**	163	657	4.0	28	3	52	549	**10.6**	**49**	2
1986	NWE	**16**	15	156	412	2.6	17	3	**77**	**684**	8.9	**49**	**5**
1987	NWE	13	11	147	474	3.2	19	3	44	347	7.9	29	3
1990	MIA	1	0	0	0	0.0	0	0	0	0	0.0	0	0
		103	83	1,191	4,647	3.9	54	32	261	2,356	9.0	49	12

=== Playoffs ===
Year	Team	Games		Rushing					Receiving				
Year	Team	GP	GS	Att	Yds	Avg	Lng	TD	Rec	Yds	Avg	Lng	TD
1982	NWE	1	0	7	35	5.0	7	0	1	17	**17.0**	17	0
1985	NWE	**4**	**4**	**35**	**119**	3.4	14	0	**8**	**56**	7.0	11	**1**
1986	NWE	1	1	5	46	**9.2**	**23**	0	4	46	11.5	**20**	0
		6	5	47	200	4.3	23	0	13	119	9.2	20	1

== Arena football ==
In 1991, Collins joined the Orlando Predators of the Arena Football League. On July 9, 1991, Collins drove his car into a lake in Orlando in an apparent suicide attempt.

In 1992 Collins continued his arena football career with the Cincinnati Rockers and scored nine touchdowns. In 1993, Collins played his last season of arena football with the Miami Hooters.

== After football ==
Collins educates high school athletes and their families on the college recruiting process as an educational speaker for the National Collegiate Scouting Association. He hosted an internet radio show, Sports Talk with Touchdown Tony Collins, on the VoiceAmerica Sports Channel. Collins started a foundation in 2007 called "It's for the Kids", which works with disadvantaged youths in the Finger Lakes region of Upstate New York. He published a book in 2012 entitled, Broken Road: Turning My Mess Into a Message.

== Personal ==
Collins' nephew is Reggie Branch, who played for the Washington Redskins. Collins and his wife Trudy live near Baton Rouge, LA.
