= Garin Veris =

American football player (born 1963)

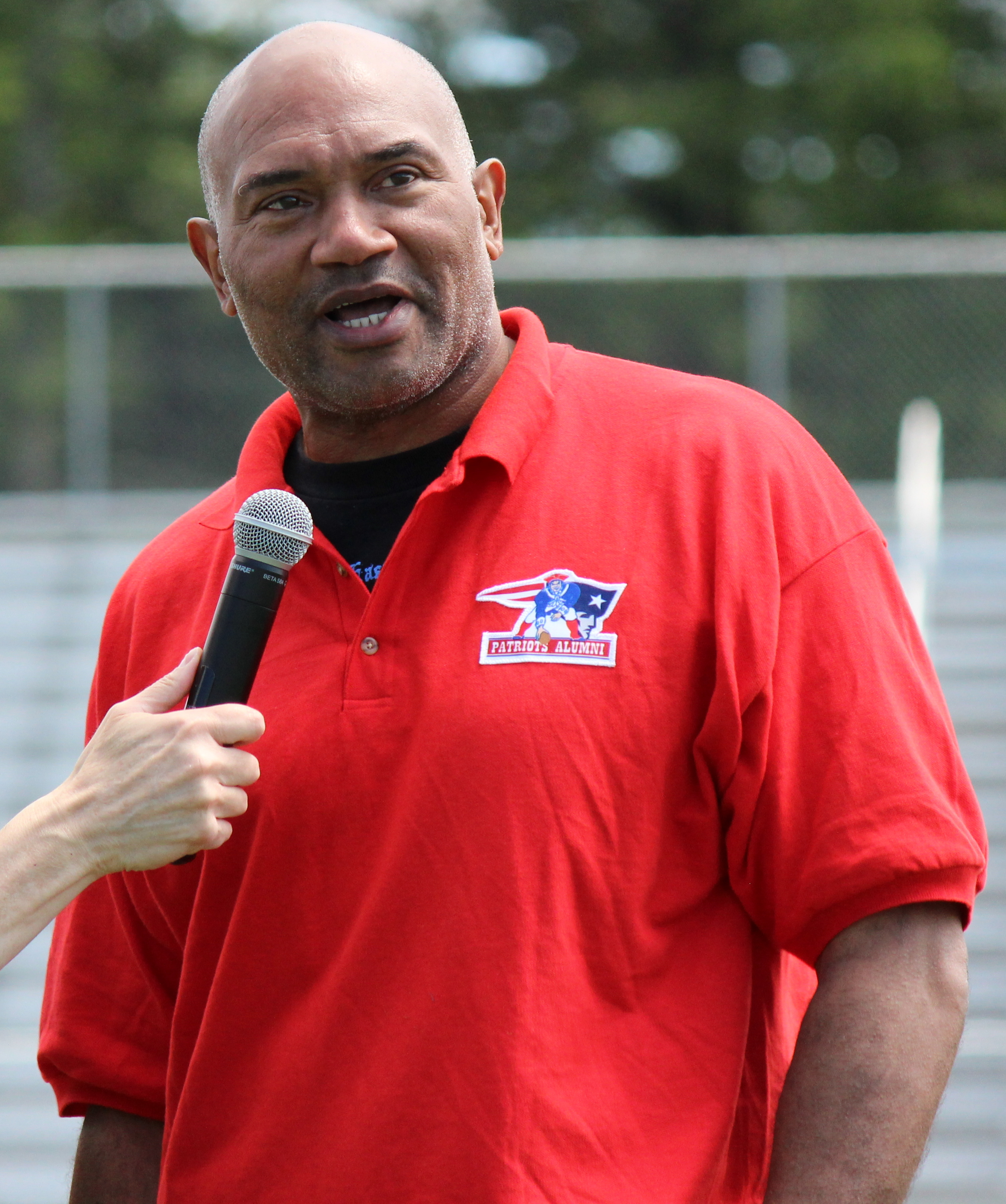
- Veris in 2015

No. 60, 90, 93
- Position: Defensive end

Personal information
- Born: February 27, 1963 (age 63); Chillicothe, Ohio, U.S.
- Listed height: 6 ft 4 in (1.93 m)
- Listed weight: 255 lb (116 kg)

Career information
- High school: Chillicothe (OH)
- College: Stanford
- NFL draft: 1985: 2nd round, 48th overall pick

Career history
- New England Patriots (1985–1991); San Francisco 49ers (1992)

Awards and highlights
- PFWA All-Rookie Team (1985); New England Patriots All-1980s Team; Second-team All-American (1984); First-team All-Pac-10 (1984); Second-team All-Pac-10 (1983)

Career NFL statistics
- Sacks: 36
- Fumble recoveries: 7
- Stats at Pro Football Reference

Garin Lee Veris (born February 27, 1963) is an American former professional football player who was a defensive end in the National Football League (NFL), primarily for the New England Patriots.

Veris graduated from Chillicothe High School, where he starred in football (playing offense and defense) and basketball in 1981. Veris also starred in track and field, winning the OHSAA Class AAA shot put and discus throw titles in 1980, then repeating in each event as champion in 1981. After high school, Veris played college football for the Stanford Cardinal. His outstanding performance culminated with his induction into the Stanford University Athletics Hall of Fame. Veris was on the Stanford football team during the 1982 game against California where Cal won the game on a final play known as The Play. He was selected in the second round of the 1985 NFL draft by the New England Patriots. During his rookie season, he recorded 14 sacks—including four in the playoffs—and started in Super Bowl XX, where his team lost to the Chicago Bears. He finished his career in 1992 with the San Francisco 49ers and later was named to the Patriots' All-1980s team.

Since March 5, 2013, Veris has worked as the director of external business development & marketing for UMass Boston Athletics.

He was athletic director at Massachusetts Maritime Academy from November 2015 until March 2018.

Veris served as the athletic director and at-risk coordinator at his alma mater Chillicothe High School in Chillicothe, Ohio in 2011–2012. He previously served as the AD at Haverhill High School in Haverhill, Massachusetts in 2009–2010.

== In popular culture ==
Veris was featured in the Family Guy episode "Run, Chris, Run" as the character Glenn Quagmire is playing as Veris and unsuccessfully trying to tackle Bo Jackson with in the game Tecmo Super Bowl. Veris was listed as a teammate of Ronnie Lott in the game for the 49ers in a somewhat anachronistic move, as Lott was playing for the Los Angeles Raiders by the time Veris was playing for the 49ers, and Jackson was out of the NFL due to his devastating hip injury two years before.
