= Lester Williams (American football) =

American football player (1959–2017)

No. 72, 96
- Positions: Defensive tackle, defensive end

Personal information
- Born: January 19, 1959; Miami, Florida, U.S.
- Died: August 16, 2017 (aged 58); Birmingham, Alabama, U.S.
- Listed height: 6 ft 3 in (1.91 m)
- Listed weight: 275 lb (125 kg)

Career information
- High school: Carol City (Miami Gardens, Florida)
- College: Miami
- NFL draft: 1982: 1st round, 27th overall pick

Career history
- New England Patriots (1982–1985); San Diego Chargers (1986); St. Louis Cardinals (1987)*; Seattle Seahawks (1987)
- * Offseason or practice squad member only

Awards and highlights
- PFWA All-Rookie Team (1982); First-team All-American (1981)

Career NFL statistics
- Sacks: 6.5
- Fumble recoveries: 2
- Stats at Pro Football Reference

Lester Williams (January 19, 1959 – August 16, 2017) was an American professional football player who was a defensive tackle in the National Football League (NFL), mainly for the New England Patriots, including the team's first Super Bowl appearance. He finished his career with the San Diego Chargers in 1986 and the Seattle Seahawks in 1987.

Williams was born in Miami, Florida. He attended Carol City High School. He was an All-American at the University of Miami in 1981. He was selected in the first round (27th overall pick) of the 1982 NFL draft. Williams was added to the school's Sports Hall of Fame in 1999.

He died at his home in Birmingham, Alabama on August 16, 2017, at age 58.
