= Johnny Rembert =

American football player (born 1961)

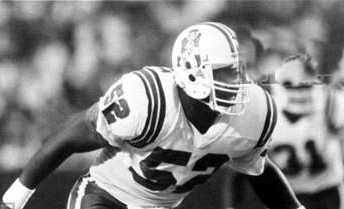
- Rembert playing for the Patriots, c. 1988

No. 52
- Position: Linebacker

Personal information
- Born: January 19, 1961 (age 65); Hollandale, Mississippi, U.S.
- Listed height: 6 ft 3 in (1.91 m)
- Listed weight: 234 lb (106 kg)

Career information
- High school: DeSoto County (Arcadia, Florida)
- College: Cowley CC (1979–1980); Clemson (1981–1982)
- NFL draft: 1983: 4th round, 101st overall pick

Career history
- New England Patriots (1983–1992)

Awards and highlights
- 2× Pro Bowl (1988, 1989); New England Patriots All-1980s Team; National champion (1981); First-team All-ACC (1982)

Career NFL statistics
- Sacks: 16
- Interceptions: 7
- Games: 126
- Stats at Pro Football Reference

Johnny Lee Rembert (born January 19, 1961) is an American former professional football player who was a linebacker for 10 seasons with the New England Patriots of the National Football League (NFL). He played college football for the Clemson Tigers. Rembert was a member of the 1985 AFC champions who played the Chicago Bears in Super Bowl XX in New Orleans. In the Wild Card Round of the 1985–86 NFL playoffs, he had a fumble recovery return for a touchdown against the New York Jets. He was selected to the AFC Pro Bowl team twice (1988 and 1989). He won AFC Defensive Player of the Week in Week 10 of the 1988 season.

After his playing career, Rembert was the director of athletics at Edward Waters College in Jacksonville, Florida and also the quality control representative for the NFL.
