= 1989 New England Patriots season =

American football season

- Owner: Victor Kiam
- General manager: Patrick Sullivan
- Head coach: Raymond Berry
- Home stadium: Sullivan Stadium

Results
- Record: 5–11
- Division place: 4th AFC East
- Playoffs: Did not qualify
- All-Pros: None
- Pro Bowlers: LB Johnny Rembert

Uniform

The 1989 New England Patriots season was the team's 30th, and 20th in the National Football League. The Patriots finished the season with a record of five wins and eleven losses, and finished fourth in the AFC East Division. After the season, Head Coach Raymond Berry was fired and replaced by Rod Rust.

The Patriots' pass defense surrendered 7.64 yards-per-attempt in 1989, one of the ten worst totals in NFL history. The week 7 matchup with the San Francisco 49ers was moved to Stanford Stadium on the campus of Stanford University after the Loma Prieta earthquake, which had caused some damage to the 49ers' usual home of Candlestick Park 5 days earlier during the World Series.

== Offseason ==
=== Draft ===
1989 New England Patriots draft
Round	Pick	Player	Position	College	Notes
1	16	Hart Lee Dykes	Wide receiver	Oklahoma State	
2	43	Eric Coleman	Cornerback	Wyoming	
3	63	Marv Cook	Tight end	Iowa	
3	73	Chris Gannon	Defensive end	Southwestern Louisiana	
4	96	Maurice Hurst	Cornerback	Southern	
4	100	Michael Timpson	Wide receiver	Penn State	
6	165	Eric Mitchel	Running back	Oklahoma	
7	178	Eric Lindstrom	Linebacker	Boston College	
8	210	Rodney Rice	Defensive back	BYU	
8	223	Tony Zackery	Cornerback	Washington	
9	240	Darron Norris	Running back	Texas	
9	247	Curtis Wilson	Center	Missouri	
10	267	Emanuel McNeil	Defensive tackle	Tennessee-Martin	
11	294	Tony Hinz	Running back	Harvard	
12	324	Aaron Chubb	Linebacker	Georgia	
Made roster † Pro Football Hall of Fame * Made at least one Pro Bowl during career

=== Undrafted free agents ===
1989 undrafted free agents of note
Player	Position	College
Glenn Antrum	Wide receiver	UConn
Lon Bankston	Running back	Delta State
Creighton Informinias	Tackle	North Carolina
Chuck Pellegrini	Guard	Central Michigan

== Personnel ==
=== Staff ===
1989 New England Patriots staff
Front office: Chairman – Victor Kiam; Vice Chairman – Fran Murray; President – Billy Sullivan; Vice-president – Bucko Kilroy; General manager – Patrick Sullivan; Director of Player Development – Dick Steinberg; Director of Pro Scouting – Bill McPeak; Director of college scouting – Joe Mendes; Special assistant to head coach – John Polonchek; Head coaches: Head coach – Raymond Berry; Offensive coaches: Quarterbacks – Richard Wood; Offensive backfield – Bobby Grier; Receivers – Harold Jackson; Offensive line – Guy Morriss	Defensive coaches: Defensive line – Eddie Khayat; Assistant defensive line – Ray Hamilton; Linebackers – Don Shinnick; Assistant linebackers – Don Blackmon; Defensive backfield – Jimmy Carr; Special teams coaches: Special teams/tight ends – Keith Rowen; Strength and conditioning: Strength and conditioning – Jerry Simmons

=== Roster ===
1989 New England Patriots roster
Quarterbacks (QB): 2 Doug Flutie; 14 Steve Grogan; 15 Marc Wilson; Running backs (RB): 33 Patrick Egu; 34 Bob Perryman FB; 44 John Stephens; 30 Mosi Tatupu FB; 35 George Wonsley; Wide receivers (WR): 10 Glenn Antrum; 88 Hart Lee Dykes; 80 Irving Fryar PR; 83 Cedric Jones; Tight ends (TE): 46 Marv Cook; 87 Lin Dawson; 85 Eric Sievers	Offensive linemen (OL): 78 Bruce Armstrong T; 68 Mike Baab C; 67 David Douglas G; 62 Sean Farrell G; 74 Gerry Feehery C/G; 64 Mike Morris; 76 Tom Rehder T; 70 David Viaene T; 73 Danny Villa T/G; Defensive linemen (DL): 72 Tim Goad NT; 97 Milford Hodge DE; 92 Emanuel McNeil NT; 90 Peter Shorts DE; 96 Brent Williams DE	Linebackers (LB): 59 Vincent Brown ILB; 58 Terrence Cooks ILB; 91 Orlando Lowry OLB; 50 Larry McGrew OLB; 52 Johnny Rembert LB; 95 Ed Reynolds ILB; 51 Bruce Scholtz OLB; 94 David Ward ILB; Defensive backs (DB): 28 Jim Bowman SS; 26 Raymond Clayborn CB; 27 Howard Feggins CB; 41 Darryl Holmes FS; 37 Maurice Hurst CB; 38 Roland James SS; 31 Fred Marion FS; 23 Rod McSwain CB; Special teams (ST): 6 Jeff Feagles P; 4 Jason Staurovsky K	Practice squad: 40 Eric Mitchell RB; 18 John Simpson WR; 17 Todd White WR; Reserve: 39 Marvin Allen (IR); -- Aaron Chubb LB (IR); 22 Eric Coleman CB (IR); 66 Paul Fairchild G (IR); 99 Gary Jeter DE (IR); 93 Tim Jordan LB (IR); 42 Ronnie Lippett CB (IR); 82 Sammy Martin (IR); 86 Stanley Morgan WR (IR); 43 Rodney Rice CB/KR (IR); 77 Kenneth Sims DE (IR); 49 Kitrick Taylor WR (IR); 45 Michael Timpson WR (IR); 56 Andre Tippett LB (IR); 21 Erroll Tucker (IR); 60 Garin Veris DE (IR); 54 Ed Williams LB (PUP); 75 Curtis Wilson C (IR); 61 Ron Wooten G (IR); 47 active, 19 inactive, 3 practice squad Rookies in italics

== Regular season ==
=== Schedule ===
Week	Date	Opponent	Result	Record	Venue	Attendance	Recap
1	September 10	at **New York Jets**	**W** 27–24	1–0	Giants Stadium	64,541	Recap
2	September 17	**Miami Dolphins**	**L** 10–24	1–1	Foxboro Stadium	57,043	Recap
3	September 24	Seattle Seahawks	**L** 3–24	1–2	Foxboro Stadium	48,025	Recap
4	October 1	at **Buffalo Bills**	**L** 10–31	1–3	Rich Stadium	78,921	Recap
5	October 8	Houston Oilers	**W** 23–13	2–3	Foxboro Stadium	59,828	Recap
6	October 15	at Atlanta Falcons	**L** 15–16	2–4	Atlanta–Fulton County Stadium	39,697	Recap
7	October 22	at San Francisco 49ers	**L** 20–37	2–5	Stanford Stadium	51,781	Recap
8	October 29	at **Indianapolis Colts**	**W** 23–20	3–5	Hoosier Dome	59,356	Recap
9	November 5	**New York Jets**	**L** 26–27	3–6	Foxboro Stadium	53,366	Recap
10	November 12	New Orleans Saints	**L** 24–28	3–7	Foxboro Stadium	47,680	Recap
11	November 19	**Buffalo Bills**	**W** 33–24	4–7	Foxboro Stadium	49,663	Recap
12	November 26	at Los Angeles Raiders	**L** 21–24	4–8	Los Angeles Memorial Coliseum	38,747	Recap
13	December 3	**Indianapolis Colts**	**W** 22–16	5–8	Foxboro Stadium	32,234	Recap
14	December 10	at **Miami Dolphins**	**L** 10–31	5–9	Joe Robbie Stadium	55,918	Recap
15	December 17	at Pittsburgh Steelers	**L** 10–28	5–10	Three Rivers Stadium	26,594	Recap
16	December 24	Los Angeles Rams	**L** 20–24	5–11	Foxboro Stadium	27,940	Recap
Note: Intra-division opponents are in **bold** text.

=== Game summaries ===
==== Week 1 ====
Team	1	2	3	4	Total
• Patriots	7	14	0	6	27
Jets	0	0	17	7	24

- Date: September 10
- Location: Giants Stadium, East Rutherford, New Jersey
- Game start: 4:00 p.m. EST
- Game attendance: 64,541
- Game weather: 85 °F (29 °C); wind 9 mph (14 km/h)
- Referee: Ben Dreith

Scoring summary
Q1	NE	Fryar 20 yard pass from Eason (Davis kick)	NE 7–0
Q2	NE	Morgan 30 yard pass from Eason (Davis kick)	NE 14–0
Q2	NE	Stephens 1 yard run (Davis kick)	NE 21–0
Q3	NYJ	Vick 1 yard pass from O'Brien (Leahy kick)	NE 21–7
Q3	NYJ	Leahy 40 yard field goal	NE 21–10
Q3	NYJ	Prokop 17 yard run (Leahy kick)	NE 21–17
Q4	NYJ	Townsell 48 yard pass from O'Brien (Leahy kick)	NYJ 24–21
Q4	NE	Dupard 4 yard run (kick failed)	NE 27–24

- Cedric Jones 8 Rec, 148 Yds

==== Week 4: at Buffalo Bills ====
Week 4: New England Patriots at Buffalo Bills

Quarter	1	2	3	4	Total
Patriots	3	0	7	0	**10**
**Bills**	7	17	0	7	**31**

at Rich Stadium, Orchard Park, NY

- Date: October 1, 1989
- Game time: 1:00 p.m. EST
- Game weather: Overcast, 60 °F (16 °C)
- TV announcers (NBC): Charlie Jones and Merlin Olsen

Game information

**First quarter**

**Second quarter**

**Third quarter**

**Fourth quarter**

Top passers

- NE – Doug Flutie – 15/41, 176 yards, TD, INT
- BUF – Jim Kelly – 12/17, 278 yards, 3 TD

Top rushers

- NE – Bob Perryman – 15 rushes, 68 yards
- BUF – Thurman Thomas – 21 rushes, 105 yards, TD

Top receivers

- NE – Cedric Jones – 4 receptions, 48 yards, TD
- BUF – Andre Reed – 4 receptions, 114 yards

=== Standings ===
AFC East
	W	L	T	PCT	DIV	CONF	PF	PA	STK
^{(3)} Buffalo Bills	9	7	0	.563	6–2	8–4	409	317	W1
Indianapolis Colts	8	8	0	.500	4–4	7–5	298	301	L1
Miami Dolphins	8	8	0	.500	4–4	6–8	331	379	L2
New England Patriots	5	11	0	.313	4–4	5–7	297	391	L3
New York Jets	4	12	0	.250	2–6	3–9	253	411	L3

== See also ==
- New England Patriots seasons
