= 1990 New England Patriots season =

Season in the National Football League

- Owner: Victor Kiam
- General manager: Patrick Sullivan
- Head coach: Rod Rust
- Home stadium: Foxboro Stadium

Results
- Record: 1–15
- Division place: 5th AFC East
- Playoffs: Did not qualify
- All-Pros: None
- Pro Bowlers: T Bruce Armstrong

The 1990 New England Patriots season was the team's 31st, and 21st in the National Football League (NFL). It was the first year for head coach Rod Rust, who was looking to improve on the 5–11 mark from the year before that cost Raymond Berry his job, despite the fact that Berry led the Patriots to the playoffs twice in his tenure.

The Patriots instead finished the season with a record of 1–15, the worst record in franchise history. They finished last in the AFC East Division and last in the NFL. The roster still had a number of All-Pros and regular contributors from their successful teams of the 1980s, but many of them were past the peak of their career, and the team lacked any young talent to replace them. After the team started 1–1, they would go on to lose their next fourteen games, many in humiliating fashion. Off the field, the team and its management were embarrassed by players' harassment of a reporter during a locker room interview.

The 1990 Patriots scored a meager 181 points the entire season, the seventh-lowest of any NFL team in the 16-game season era, and recorded a -265 point differential, the third-worst of any NFL team since the AFL–NFL merger, bettering only the 1981 Baltimore Colts, and the winless 1976 Tampa Bay Buccaneers.

17 years later, the Patriots won all 16 regular season games, becoming one of two teams since the AFL-NFL merger to have both a one-win season and an undefeated season (the Miami Dolphins were 1–15 in 2007, 35 years after their historic 17–0 campaign).

== Offseason ==
After several successful seasons in the mid-1980s, the 1989 season had been a disappointment, as the Patriots finished 5–11 and fired head coach Raymond Berry. To replace him, the team hired Rod Rust, a long-time defensive coach who had served as defensive coordinator for several NFL teams, including a 5-season tenure with the Patriots that included their (to that point) only Super Bowl appearance following the 1985 season. The team also traded wide receiver Stanley Morgan, at that point the best receiver in team history, to Indianapolis. Most of the team returned from the 1989 team, however many of the key starters from most of the 1980s such as future Pro Football Hall of Fame linebacker Andre Tippett, quarterback Steve Grogan (who would finish his career with the most games in a Patriots uniform), cornerback Ronnie Lippett, and defensive end Garin Veris were all in the twilight of their careers. Among former Pro Bowlers returning to the team were offensive lineman Bruce Armstrong and wide receiver Irving Fryar.

== Season recap ==
The team opened with a close-played loss to Miami in week 1 in which quarterback Steve Grogan outplayed his Miami counterpart, future Hall-of-Famer Dan Marino. Marino threw three interceptions during the game, while Grogan had none, however Miami running back Sammie Smith made up the difference, rushing for 159 on the ground and a third quarter touchdown that kept Miami in the game. After harassing Marino all game, the defense gave up a crucial fourth quarter touchdown from Marino to running back Tony Paige for the go-ahead score late in the fourth quarter.

They rebounded in week 2 with a win over the Indianapolis Colts in a defensive struggle in which the Patriots picked off Colts quarterback Jeff George four times. Kicker Jason Staurovsky was the hero of the game, hitting three field goals in a 16–14 win. After two games, the team was 1–1, and the defense had intercepted the opposing quarterbacks seven times in just two games, as well as forcing three fumbles and recovering two of these. That gave the Patriots a 9–1 turnover differential, with the offense playing well enough to keep the teams in games. The day after the victory over the Colts, after the conclusion of the Monday practice, tight end Zeke Mowatt, running back Robert Perryman and wide receiver Michael Timpson allegedly stood in front of Boston Herald reporter Lisa Olson semi-naked and sexually harassed her in the Patriots locker room at Foxboro Stadium. The incident proved a major embarrassment for the franchise. The media firestorm surrounding the event proved a major distraction to the team in preparation for their next game.

Steve Grogan had been suffering nagging injuries for most of the previous several games, and with Marc Wilson, a former starter for the Oakland Raiders, healthy, Rust decided to start him. The decision proved disastrous, as the team was blown out in week 3 by the Bengals 41–7, with the defense failing to live up to the form they showed in the first two games, and the offense entirely ineffective. Wilson himself was benched late in the game for Tommy Hodson, who completed four passes once the game was already out of control.

Rust would stay with Marc Wilson for the next three games, probably owing to Grogan's failing health and Hodson's lack of game experience. Wilson would lose the next three games in succession, including a three-interception, zero-touchdown performance against division rival New York Jets in week 4, a 33–20 loss to the Seahawks in Week 5, and following a bye in week 6, a 17–10 loss to the Dolphins in week 7.

In week 8, Grogan was given the starting job back. However, out of rhythm and hobbled by injury, he was also ineffective, going 15-for-31 with two interceptions in a 27–10 loss against the Bills in what would be his final start as a Patriot. Wilson got the job back the following week, but he too lost to the Eagles 48–20, in which the defense was noted for its lack of effort, a stark contrast to the team which had been so defensively dominant over the first two games of the season. Week 10 saw what was perhaps the most unwatchable football of the season, in which neither the Patriots nor the Colts seemed to want to win the game; Wilson threw for only 87 yards in that game, and his counterpart Jeff George for only 106. Despite only mustering 155 total yards on offense, the Colts won 13–10. Wilson would keep his starting job for only one more week, a 14–0 shut-out at the hands of Buffalo, in which Wilson threw two interceptions.

Faced with a lost season, Rust handed the reins to Tommy Hodson, who would start at quarterback for the rest of the season. Hodson started promising; in his first start in week 12 against the Phoenix Cardinals, he went 17-for-29 with two touchdowns and no interceptions, but the defense could not stop the potent Cardinals rushing attack, and they ended up with 201 yards on the ground and four rushing touchdowns, including two from quarterback Timm Rosenbach, to crush the Patriots 34–14. A 37–7 loss to the Chiefs, in which Hodson threw an interception but no touchdowns, and in which the Patriots could only get 64 yards rushing came in week 13, and a similarly anemic Patriots offense could only muster a field goal and 182 yards in a 24–3 loss to the Steelers.

They lost a nationally televised game in week 15 to the Washington Redskins in which they were down 9–0 before the Redskins even ran an offensive play. The Redskins' two first-quarter scores came on a Kurt Gouveia fumble return for a touchdown, and the Patriots snapping the ball out of the end zone for a safety. The announced crowd for the game, played in driving rain, was 22,286. The Patriots’ final game of the season, against the eventual Super Bowl champion New York Giants, drew a sellout crowd to Foxboro. However over 40,000 fans were rooting for the visitors, as tickets to Giants home games were nearly impossible to come by for non-season-ticket holders.

The Patriots’ negative-265 point-differential (181 points scored, 446 points surrendered) was the worst total of the 1990s. It is notable that like the previous season's Dallas Cowboys, the Patriots played only three teams with non-winning records – divisional rivals the Indianapolis Colts and New York Jets plus one game against the Phoenix Cardinals – all season. The 1990 Patriots gave up 2 or more touchdowns in 14 out of 16 games and scored multiple TDs in only 4 games all season (however, the team's lone win in Week 2 against the Indianapolis Colts combined both of these negative features in a 16-14 final score).

The 1990 Patriots and 1981 Baltimore Colts are the only NFL teams since 1940 to have eleven losses during which they never led in one season.

The 1990 Patriots became the third team to end a season at 1–15, with the Dallas Cowboys finishing the 1989 season with the exact same record, not to mention the New Orleans Saints finishing the 1980 season 1-15 and were matched by the 1991 Colts the next year. They also tied the 1976 Tampa Bay Buccaneers for most consecutive losses inside one season (the Buccaneers lost all 14 games, with the NFL only adopting a sixteen-game schedule in 1978), a record later eclipsed by the 15-straight losing 2001 Carolina Panthers. It was then topped by the 0–16 2008 Detroit Lions and 0–16 2017 Cleveland Browns.

After the season, Stan Clayton, Eric Coleman, Lin Dawson, Fred DeRiggi, David Douglas, Hart Lee Dykes, Paul Fairchild, and Chris Gambol decided they had all played their final NFL games.

== Personnel ==
=== Staff ===
1990 New England Patriots staff
Front office: Chairman and CEO – Victor Kiam; Vice Chairman – Fran Murray; President – Billy Sullivan; Vice President – Bucko Kilroy; General Manager – Patrick Sullivan; Director of Player Operations – Joe Mendes; Director of Pro Scouting – Bill McPeak; Special Assistant to the Head Coach – John Polonchek; Head coaches: Head coach – Rod Rust; Offensive coaches: Offensive Coordinator/Quarterbacks – Jimmy Raye; Offensive Backs – Bobby Grier; Receivers – Richard Wood; Offensive Line – Rod Humenuik	Defensive coaches: Defensive Coordinator/Defensive Backs – Charlie Sumner; Defensive Line – Dale Lindsey; Outside Linebackers – Don Blackmon; Inside Linebackers – Steve Nelson; Special teams coaches: Special Teams/Tight Ends – Steve Crosby; Strength and conditioning: Strength and Conditioning – Jerry Simmons

== Roster ==
1990 New England Patriots roster
Quarterbacks (QB): 14 Steve Grogan; 13 Tommy Hodson; 15 Marc Wilson; Running backs (RB): 33 George Adams; 39 Marvin Allen KR; 35 Anthony Landry; 29 Jamie Lawson FB; 44 John Stephens; 30 Mosi Tatupu FB; Wide receivers (WR): 88 Hart Lee Dykes; 80 Irving Fryar PR; 83 Cedric Jones; 86 Greg McMurtry; 45 Michael Timpson; Tight ends (TE): 46 Marv Cook; 81 Zeke Mowatt	Offensive linemen (OL): 78 Bruce Armstrong T; 76 Stan Clayton T; 65 Elbert Crawford G; 67 David Douglas G/C; 74 Chris Gambol G; 68 Damian Johnson G; 70 David Viaene T; 75 Danny Villa; Defensive linemen (DL): 71 Fred DeRiggi NT; 91 Chris Gannon DE; 72 Tim Goad NT; 60 Marion Hobby DE; 97 Sean Smith DE; 96 Brent Williams DE	Linebackers (LB): 59 Vincent Brown LB; 58 Richard Harvey ILB; 50 Ilia Jarostchuk OLB; 55 Chris Singleton OLB; 56 Andre Tippett OLB; 54 Ed Williams OLB; Defensive backs (DB): 41 Tim Gordon FS; 40 Tim Hauck FS; 37 Maurice Hurst CB; 38 Roland James SS; 42 Ronnie Lippett CB; 31 Fred Marion FS; 23 Rod McSwain SS; 27 Junior Robinson CB/KR; 21 Mickey Washington CB; Special teams (ST): 10 Brian Hansen P; 4 Jason Staurovsky K	Practice squad: 62 Blaine Rose G; Reserve: 92 Ray Agnew DE (IR); 63 Gene Chilton C (IR); 22 Eric Coleman CB (IR); -- Ventson Donelson S (IR); 66 Paul Fairchild C/G (IR); 43 Ernest Gibson CB (IR); 82 Sammy Martin (IR); 64 Jon Melander G (IR); 24 Jamie Morris (IR); 52 Johnny Rembert LB (IR); 95 Ed Reynolds LB (IR); 85 Eric Sievers TE (IR); 53 Richard Tardits LB (IR); 90 Garin Veris DE (IR); 25 Tony Zackery S (IR); 47 active, 15 inactive, 1 practice squad Rookies in italics

== Regular season ==
=== Schedule ===
Week	Date	Opponent	Result	Record	Venue	Attendance
1	September 9	**Miami Dolphins**	**L** 24–27	0–1	Foxboro Stadium	45,305
2	September 16	at **Indianapolis Colts**	**W** 16–14	1–1	Hoosier Dome	49,256
3	September 23	at Cincinnati Bengals	**L** 7–41	1–2	Riverfront Stadium	56,470
4	September 30	**New York Jets**	**L** 13–37	1–3	Foxboro Stadium	36,724
5	October 7	Seattle Seahawks	**L** 20–33	1–4	Foxboro Stadium	39,735
6	Bye					
7	October 18	at **Miami Dolphins**	**L** 10–17	1–5	Joe Robbie Stadium	62,630
8	October 28	**Buffalo Bills**	**L** 10–27	1–6	Foxboro Stadium	51,959
9	November 4	at Philadelphia Eagles	**L** 20–48	1–7	Veterans Stadium	65,514
10	November 11	**Indianapolis Colts**	**L** 10–13	1–8	Foxboro Stadium	28,924
11	November 18	at **Buffalo Bills**	**L** 0–14	1–9	Rich Stadium	74,270
12	November 25	at Phoenix Cardinals	**L** 14–34	1–10	Sun Devil Stadium	30,110
13	December 2	Kansas City Chiefs	**L** 7–37	1–11	Foxboro Stadium	26,280
14	December 9	at Pittsburgh Steelers	**L** 3–24	1–12	Three Rivers Stadium	48,354
15	December 15	Washington Redskins	**L** 10–25	1–13	Foxboro Stadium	22,286
16	December 23	at **New York Jets**	**L** 7–42	1–14	Giants Stadium	30,250
17	December 30	New York Giants	**L** 10–13	1–15	Foxboro Stadium	60,410
Note: Intra-division opponents are in **bold** text.

=== Season summary ===
==== Week 1 ====
Team	1	2	3	4	Total
• Dolphins	3	10	7	7	27
Patriots	7	14	3	0	24

- Date: September 9
- Location: Foxboro Stadium
- Game start: 4:00 p.m.

Scoring summary
Q1	MIA	Stoyanovich 31 yard field goal	MIA 3-0
Q1	NE	Fryar 22 yard pass from Grogan (Staurovsky kick)	NE 7-3
Q2	MIA	Stoyanovich 37 yard field goal	NE 7-6
Q2	NE	Stephens 1 yard rush (Staurovsky kick)	NE 14-6
Q2	NE	Cook 35 yard pass from Grogan (Staurovsky kick)	NE 21-6
Q2	MIA	Martin 35 yard pass from Marino (Stoyanovich kick)	NE 21-13
Q3	MIA	Smith 3 yard rush (Stoyanovich kick)	NE 21-20
Q3	NE	Staurovsky 42 yard field goal	NE 24-20
Q4	MIA	Paige 7 yard pass from Marino (Stoyanovich kick)	MIA 27-24

==== Week 2 ====
Team	1	2	3	4	Total
• Patriots	0	7	3	6	16
Colts	7	0	0	7	14

- Date: September 16
- Location: Hoosier Dome
- Game start: 1:00 p.m.
- Game weather: Indoors (dome)

Scoring summary
Q1	0:51	IND	Bentley 1 yard run (Biasucci kick)	IND 7–0
Q2	6:50	NE	Dykes 27 yard pass from Grogan (Staurovsky kick)	Tie 7–7
Q3	3:25	NE	Staurovsky 39 yard field goal	NE 10–7
Q4	9:26	NE	Staurovsky 27 yard field goal	NE 13–7
Q4	2:36	NE	Staurovsky 25 yard field goal	NE 16–7
Q4	2:16	IND	Brooks 68 yard pass from George (Biasucci kick)	NE 16–14

==== Week 3 ====
Team	1	2	3	4	Total
Patriots	0	7	0	0	7
• Bengals	17	14	3	7	41

- Date: September 23
- Location: Riverfront Stadium
- Game start: 1:00 p.m.

Scoring summary
Q1	CIN	Breech 46 yard field goal	CIN 3–0
Q1	CIN	Brown 42 yard pass from Esiason (Breech kick)	CIN 10–0
Q1	CIN	Holman 4 yard pass from Johnson (Breech kick)	CIN 17–0
Q2	CIN	Green 3 yard rush (Breech kick)	CIN 24–0
Q2	CIN	Brooks 6 yard rush (Breech kick)	CIN 31–0
Q2	NE	Cook 7 yard pass from Wilson (Staurovsky kick)	CIN 31–7
Q3	CIN	Breech 23 yard field goal	CIN 34–7
Q4	CIN	Holman 3 yard pass from Esiason (Breech kick)	CIN 41–7

==== Week 4 ====
Team	1	2	3	4	Total
• Jets	7	17	10	3	37
Patriots	3	3	0	7	13

- Date: September 30
- Location: Foxboro Stadium
- Game start: 4:00 p.m.

Scoring summary
Q1	NYJ	Baxter 1 yard rush (Leahy kick)	NYJ 7–0
Q1	NE	Staurovsky 46 yard field goal	NYJ 7–3
Q2	NYJ	Moore 69 yard pass from O'Brien (Leahy kick)	NYJ 14–3
Q2	NE	Staurovsky 40 yard field goal	NYJ 14–6
Q2	NYJ	Leahy 24 yard field goal	NYJ 17–6
Q2	NYJ	McNeil 4 yard rush (Leahy kick)	NYJ 24–6
Q3	NYJ	Baxter 28 yard rush (Leahy kick)	NYJ 31–6
Q3	NYJ	Leahy 18 yard field goal	NYJ 34–6
Q4	NE	Perryman 4 yard rush (Staurovsky kick)	NYJ 34–13
Q4	NYJ	Leahy 46 yard field goal	NYJ 37–13

==== Week 5 ====
Team	1	2	3	4	Total
• Seahawks	13	6	0	14	33
Patriots	3	7	7	3	20

- Date: October 7
- Location: Foxboro Stadium
- Game start: 1:00 p.m.

Scoring summary
Q1	SEA	Fenner 5 yard rush	SEA 6–0
Q1	SEA	Kane 20 yard pass from Krieg (Johnson kick)	SEA 13–0
Q1	NE	Staurovsky 53 yard field goal	SEA 13–3
Q2	SEA	Johnson 31 yard field goal	SEA 16–3
Q2	SEA	Johnson 19 yard field goal	SEA 19–3
Q2	NE	Williams 45 yard defensive fumble return (Staurovsky kick)	SEA 19–10
Q3	NE	Dykes 35 yard pass from Wilson (Staurovsky kick)	SEA 19–17
Q4	NE	Staurovsky 48 yard field goal	NE 20–19
Q4	SEA	Chadwick 45 yard pass from Krieg (Johnson kick)	SEA 26–20
Q4	SEA	Fenner 5 yard rush (Johnson kick)	SEA 33–20

==== Week 7 ====
Team	1	2	3	4	Total
Patriots	0	3	0	7	10
• Dolphins	0	10	7	0	17

- Date: October 18
- Location: Joe Robbie Stadium
- Game start: 8:00 p.m.

Scoring summary
Q2	NE	Staurovsky 41 yard field goal	NE 3–0
Q2	MIA	Stoyanovich 47 yard field goal	Tie 3–3
Q2	MIA	Higgs 19 yard blocked punt return (Stoyanovich kick)	MIA 10–3
Q3	MIA	Smith 2 yard rush (Stoyanovich kick)	MIA 17–3
Q4	NE	Adams 4 yard pass from Wilson (Staurovsky kick)	MIA 17-10

==== Week 8 ====
Team	1	2	3	4	Total
• Bills	7	7	13	0	27
Patriots	0	3	0	7	10

- Date: October 28
- Location: Foxboro Stadium
- Game start: 1:00 p.m.

Scoring summary
Q1	BUF	Smith 1 yard rush (Norwood kick)	BUF 7–0
Q2	BUF	Thomas 3 yard rush (Norwood kick)	BUF 14–0
Q2	NE	Staurovsky 32 yard field goal	BUF 14–3
Q3	BUF	Norwood 35 yard field goal	BUF 17–3
Q3	BUF	Norwood 35 yard field goal	BUF 20–3
Q3	BUF	McKeller 20 yard pass from Kelly (Norwood kick)	BUF 27–3
Q4	NE	Martin 19 yard pass from Grogan (Staurovsky kick)	BUF 27–10

==== Week 9 ====
Team	1	2	3	4	Total
Patriots	3	7	3	7	20
• Eagles	10	10	7	21	48

- Date: November 4
- Location: Veterans Stadium
- Game start: 1:00 p.m.

Scoring summary
Q1	PHI	Ruzek 27 yard field goal	PHI 3–0
Q1	NE	Staurovsky 39 yard field goal	Tie 3–3
Q1	PHI	Barnett 37 yard pass from Cunningham (Ruzek kick)	PHI 10–3
Q2	PHI	Ruzek 34 yard field goal	PHI 13–3
Q2	NE	Fryar 36 yard pass from Wilson (Staurovsky kick)	PHI 13–10
Q2	PHI	Jackson 37 yard pass from Cunningham (Ruzek kick)	PHI 20–10
Q3	PHI	Williams 23 yard pass from Cunningham (Ruzek kick)	PHI 27–10
Q3	NE	Staurovsky 44 yard field goal	PHI 27–13
Q4	PHI	Jackson 3 yard pass from Cunningham (Ruzek kick)	PHI 34–13
Q4	NE	Cook 14 yard pass from Wilson (Staurovsky kick)	PHI 34–20
Q4	PHI	Cunningham 52 yard rush (Ruzek kick)	PHI 41–20
Q4	PHI	Vick 1 yard rush (Ruzek kick)	PHI 48–20

==== Week 10 ====
Team	1	2	3	4	Total
• Colts	0	3	3	7	13
Patriots	7	3	0	0	10

- Date: November 11
- Location: Foxboro Stadium
- Game start: 1:00 p.m.

Scoring summary
Q1	NE	Allen 1 yard rush (Staurovsky kick)	NE 7–0
Q2	IND	Biasucci 54 yard field goal	NE 7–3
Q2	NE	Staurovsky 29 yard field goal	NE 10–3
Q3	IND	Biasucci 38 yard field goal	NE 10–6
Q4	IND	Brooks 26 yard pass from George (Biasucci kick)	IND 13–10

==== Week 11 ====
Team	1	2	3	4	Total
Patriots	0	0	0	0	0
• Bills	7	0	0	7	14

- Date: November 18
- Location: Rich Stadium
- Game start: 1:00 p.m.

Scoring summary
Q1	BUF	Thomas 5 yard rush (Norwood kick)	BUF 7–0
Q4	BUF	Thomas 80 yard rush (Norwood kick)	BUF 14–0

==== Week 12 ====
Team	1	2	3	4	Total
Patriots	7	7	0	0	14
• Cardinals	7	7	10	10	34

- Date: November 25
- Location: Sun Devil Stadium
- Game start: 4:00 p.m.

Scoring summary
Q1	PHO	Thompson 5 yard rush (Del Greco kick)	PHO 7–0
Q1	BUF	Stephens 18 yard pass from Tom Hodson (Staurovsky kick)	Tie 7–7
Q2	PHO	Rosenbach 2 yard rush (Del Greco kick)	PHO 14–7
Q2	BUF	Cook 22 yard pass from Hodson (Staurovsky kick)	Tie 14–14
Q3	PHO	Del Greco 29 yard field goal	PHO 17–14
Q3	PHO	Rosenbach 6 yard rush (Del Greco kick)	PHO 24–14
Q4	PHO	Flagler 29 yard rush (Del Greco kick)	PHO 31–14
Q4	PHO	Del Greco 50 yard field goal	PHO 34–14

==== Week 13 ====
Team	1	2	3	4	Total
• Chiefs	13	10	7	7	37
Patriots	0	0	7	0	7

- Date: December 2
- Location: Foxboro Stadium
- Game start: 1:00 p.m.

Scoring summary
Q1	KAN	Paige 86 yard pass from DeBerg (Lowery kick)	KAN 7–0
Q1	KAN	Lowery 19 yard field goal	KAN 10–0
Q1	KAN	Lowery 32 yard field goal	KAN 13–0
Q2	KAN	Lowery 45 yard field goal	KAN 16–0
Q2	KAN	Thomas 11 yard pass from DeBerg (Lowery kick)	KAN 23–0
Q3	KAN	Okoye 1 yard rush (Lowery kick)	KAN 30–0
Q3	NE	Cook 2 yard pass from Hodson (Staurovsky kick)	KAN 30–7
Q4	KAN	Okoye 1 yard rush (Lowery kick)	KAN 37–7

==== Week 14 ====
Team	1	2	3	4	Total
Patriots	0	3	0	0	3
• Steelers	3	7	7	7	24

- Date: December 9
- Location: Three Rivers Stadium
- Game start: 1:00 p.m.

Scoring summary
Q1	PIT	Anderson 42 yard field goal	PIT 3–0
Q2	PIT	Hoge 8 yard rush (Anderson kick)	PIT 10–0
Q2	NE	Staurovsky 49 yard field goal	PIT 10–3
Q3	PIT	Green 14 yard pass from Brister (Anderson kick)	PIT 17–3
Q4	PIT	Hoge 41 yard rush (Anderson kick)	PIT 24–3

==== Week 15 ====
Team	1	2	3	4	Total
• Redskins	9	10	0	6	25
Patriots	0	0	7	3	10

- Date: December 15
- Location: Foxboro Stadium
- Game start: 4:00 p.m. EST
- Game attendance: 22,286
- Referee: Gene Barth
- TV announcers (CBS): Dick Stockton and Merlin Olsen

Scoring summary
Q1	WAS	Gouveia 39 yard defensive fumble return (Lohmiller kick)	WAS 7–0
Q1	WAS	Safety, ball snapped out of end zone	WAS 9–0
Q2	WAS	Byner 5 yard rush (Lohmiller kick)	WAS 16–0
Q2	WAS	Lohmiller 19 yard field goal	WAS 19–0
Q3	NE	Stephens 4 yard rush (Staurovsky kick)	WAS 19–7
Q4	NE	Staurovsky 42 yard field goal	WAS 19–10
Q4	WAS	Lohmiller 38 yard field goal	WAS 22–10
Q4	WAS	Lohmiller 26 yard field goal	WAS 25–10

==== Week 16 ====
Team	1	2	3	4	Total
Patriots	0	7	0	0	7
• Jets	7	14	14	7	42

- Date: December 23
- Location: Giants Stadium
- Game start: 1:00 p.m.

Scoring summary
Q2	NYJ	Hector 7 yard rush (Leahy kick)	NYJ 7–0
Q2	NE	Fryar 24 yard pass from Wilson (Staurovsky kick)	Tie 7–7
Q2	NYJ	Moore 2 yard pass from O'Brien (Leahy kick)	NYJ 14–7
Q2	NYJ	McNeil 9 yard rush (Leahy kick)	NYJ 21–7
Q2	NYJ	McNeil 1 yard rush (Leahy kick)	NYJ 28–7
Q2	NYJ	Thomas 6 yard pass from O'Brien (Leahy kick)	NYJ 35–7
Q2	NYJ	Taylor 5 yard rush (Leahy kick)	NYJ 42–7

==== Week 17 ====
Team	1	2	3	4	Total
• Giants	10	3	0	0	13
Patriots	0	10	0	0	10

- Date: December 30
- Location: Foxboro Stadium
- Game start: 1:00 p.m.

Scoring summary
Q1	NYG	Meggett 17 yard pass from Hostetler (Bahr kick)	NYG 7–0
Q1	NYG	Bahr 44 yard field goal	NYG 7–0
Q2	NE	Fryar 40 yard pass from Hodson (Staurovsky kick)	NYG 10–7
Q2	NE	Staurovsky 19 yard field goal	Tie 10–10
Q2	NYG	Bahr 27 yard field goal	NYG 13–10

=== Standings ===
AFC East
	W	L	T	PCT	DIV	CONF	PF	PA	STK
^{(1)} Buffalo Bills	13	3	0	.813	7–1	10–2	428	263	L1
^{(4)} Miami Dolphins	12	4	0	.750	7–1	10–2	336	242	W1
Indianapolis Colts	7	9	0	.438	3–5	5–7	281	353	L1
New York Jets	6	10	0	.375	2–6	4–10	295	345	W2
New England Patriots	1	15	0	.063	1–7	1–11	181	446	L14

== See also ==
- List of organizational conflicts in the NFL
