= Cedric Jones (wide receiver) =

American football player (born 1960)

No. 83
- Position: Wide receiver

Personal information
- Born: June 1, 1960 (age 66); Norfolk, Virginia, U.S.
- Listed height: 6 ft 1 in (1.85 m)
- Listed weight: 184 lb (83 kg)

Career information
- High school: Weldon (Weldon, North Carolina)
- College: Duke
- NFL draft: 1982: 3rd round, 56th overall pick

Career history
- New England Patriots (1982–1990); Houston Oilers (1991)*
- * Offseason or practice squad member only

Awards and highlights
- Second-team All-American (1981); First-team All-ACC (1981); Duke football Hall of Fame

Career NFL statistics
- Receptions: 191
- Receiving yards: 2,703
- Receiving touchdowns: 16
- Stats at Pro Football Reference

Cedric Decorrus Jones (/ˈsiːdrɪk/ SEED-rik; born June 1, 1960) is an American former professional football player who was a wide receiver for nine seasons with the National Football League (NFL)'s New England Patriots. He was selected by the Patriots with the 56th overall pick in the third round of the 1982 NFL draft, and played college football for the Duke Blue Devils.

== College career ==
=== Duke ===
Cedric Jones played football for the Blue Devils from 1978 to 1981, where he had an outstanding career. Jones finished his college career with 99 catches for 1,732 yards and 21 touchdowns, with 42 receptions for 832 yards and 10 touchdowns coming during his senior season. Not only was his senior season remarkable statistically, he also served as captain of the team, received team MVP, All-ACC honors, and second-team All-America. Represented Duke in the prestigious Senior Bowl following his senior season.

He led the ACC in receiving yardage in 1981 and, as a sophomore, returned a kickoff 97 yards for a touchdown versus Wake Forest. The top receiving yardage game of his career came on October 24, 1981, against Maryland when he caught six passes for 183 yards and two touchdowns.

He graduated from Duke in 1982 with degrees in history and political science.

== Professional career ==
Jones played his entire 9-year career with the Patriots. He helped lead the Patriots to an appearance in Super Bowl XX, a 46–10 loss to the Chicago Bears. His best season came in 1989 when he caught 48 balls for 670 yards (14 yards per catch) and 6 touchdowns. Jones finished his career with 191 receptions for 2,703 yards and 16 touchdowns. He also contributed occasionally on special teams, returning 14 kickoffs throughout his career.

== NFL career statistics ==
Legend
**Bold**	Career high

Year	Team	Games		Receiving				
Year	Team	GP	GS	Rec	Yds	Avg	Lng	TD
1982	NWE	2	0	1	5	5.0	5	0
1983	NWE	15	**12**	20	323	**16.2**	30	1
1984	NWE	14	3	19	244	12.8	22	2
1985	NWE	**16**	3	21	237	11.3	29	2
1986	NWE	**16**	0	14	222	15.9	28	1
1987	NWE	12	4	25	388	15.5	29	3
1988	NWE	**16**	2	22	313	14.2	41	1
1989	NWE	15	**12**	**48**	**670**	14.0	**65**	**6**
1990	NWE	14	2	21	301	14.3	26	0
Total		120	38	191	2,703	14.2	65	16

== Personal life ==
After his NFL career Jones worked for 3 years as the NFL's Director of Senior Director Consumer Products/On Field Operations, and 3 years as the NFL's Senior Director for Youth Football. He is currently the athletic director for the New York Athletic Club in New York City. After his tenure at the New York Athletic Club, he became the Director of Athletics at the Brunswick School in Greenwich, Connecticut, where he currently resides.
