= William Perry (American football) =

American football player (born 1962)

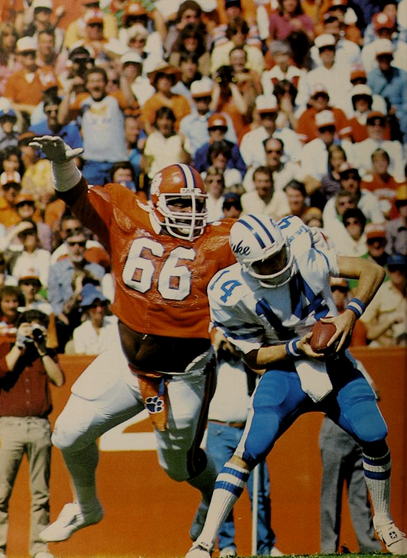
- Perry (#66) with the Clemson Tigers in 1982

No. 72, 90, 95
- Position: Defensive tackle

Personal information
- Born: December 16, 1962 (age 63); Aiken, South Carolina, U.S.
- Listed height: 6 ft 2 in (1.88 m)
- Listed weight: 335 lb (152 kg)

Career information
- High school: Aiken
- College: Clemson
- NFL draft: 1985: 1st round, 22nd overall pick

Career history
- Chicago Bears (1985–1993); Philadelphia Eagles (1993–1994); London Monarchs (1996)

Awards and highlights
- Super Bowl champion (XX); National champion (1981); ACC Player of the Year (1984); Consensus All-American (1983); First-team All-American (1984); Third-team All-American (1982); 3× First-team All-ACC (1982–1984)

Career NFL statistics
- Games played: 138
- Sacks: 29.5
- Offensive touchdowns: 3
- Stats at Pro Football Reference

William Anthony Perry (born December 16, 1962) is an American former professional football defensive tackle who played in the National Football League (NFL) for 10 seasons, primarily with the Chicago Bears. Nicknamed "the Refrigerator", he played college football for the Clemson Tigers, winning ACC Player of the Year and earning first-team All-American honors in 1984. Perry was selected in the first round of the 1985 NFL draft by the Bears, where he played his first nine seasons. He joined the Philadelphia Eagles during his ninth season in 1993 and spent his final season with the team.

In his rookie year, Perry was a member of the 1985 Bears team that won the franchise's only Super Bowl title, in Super Bowl XX. He occasionally played fullback in goal line situations during the season and set the record for the heaviest player to score a Super Bowl touchdown at 335 pounds (152 kg). He also has the largest Super Bowl ring at size 23–25.

== Early life ==
Perry was born in Aiken, South Carolina, tenth of twelve children (eight sons and four daughters) of Hollie Perry Sr (d. 2013), a house painter, and Inez (née Smith), a school dietitian. He has stated in an interview that "Even when I was little, I was big"; by the time he was 11 years old, he weighed 200 pounds. Frequently ridiculed for his weight while growing up, Perry silenced his critics with his athleticism. He attended Aiken High School and played as a 295-pound nose guard on the school's football team. During an exercise in which his coach instructed all of his fastest players to line up for a 100-yard dash, Perry joined the group of running backs, wide receivers and defensive backs and eventually was timed as the 6th fastest runner on the entire team, with a time of 11 seconds flat. He was also able to run 100 meters in under 12 seconds, and competed in the shot put event, recording a top throw of 16.44 m (53 ft 11 in). He could also execute 360-degree dunks on regulation basketball hoops and perform a complicated dive into the swimming pool.

== College career ==
Perry's athletic performances earned him a full-ride scholarship to attend Clemson University in Clemson, South Carolina, where he played for coach Danny Ford's Clemson Tigers football team from 1981 to 1984.

As a freshman in 1981, Perry earned his "Refrigerator" nickname when a fellow player could barely squeeze into an elevator with Perry and their laundry which they were taking to be washed. The player, Ray Brown, said "Man, you're about as big as a refrigerator." Perry was a member of Clemson's 1981 national championship team.

Perry was recognized three times as an All-American: he was selected to the Associated Press' third-team as a sophomore, earned consensus first-team honors as a junior, and was again a member of the first-team as a senior, as chosen by United Press International and the Walter Camp Football Foundation.

== Professional career ==
In 1985, he was selected in the first round of the 1985 NFL draft by the Chicago Bears, specifically by coach Mike Ditka. Defensive coordinator Buddy Ryan, who had a highly acrimonious relationship with Ditka, called Perry a "wasted draft-pick". Perry soon became trapped in the political mind games Ditka and Ryan engaged in with each other.

Perry's "Refrigerator" nickname followed him into the NFL and he quickly became a favorite of the Chicago Bears fans. Teammates called him "Biscuit," as in "one biscuit shy of 350 pounds".

As Ryan initially refused to play Perry, Ditka decided to use the lineman as a fullback when the team was near the opponents' goal line or in fourth and short situations, either as a ball carrier or a lead blocker for star running back Walter Payton. During his rookie season he rushed for two touchdowns and caught a pass for one. Ditka stated the inspiration for using Perry as a fullback came to him during five-yard sprint exercises. About halfway through his rookie season, Ryan finally began to play Perry, who soon proved that he was a capable defensive lineman. Perry even had the opportunity to run the ball during the Bears' win in Super Bowl XX, as a nod to his popularity and contributions to the team's success. The first time he got the ball, he was tackled for a one-yard loss while attempting to throw his first NFL pass on a halfback option play. The second time he got the ball, he scored a touchdown (running over Patriots linebacker Larry McGrew in the process).

His Super Bowl ring size is the largest of any professional football player in the history of the event. His ring size is 25, while the ring size for the average adult male is between 10 and 12.

Perry went on to play for ten years in the NFL, retiring after the 1994 season. In his ten years as a pro, he regularly struggled with his weight, which hampered his performance at times. He played in 138 games, recording 29.5 sacks and five fumble recoveries, which he returned for a total of 71 yards. In his offensive career he ran five yards for two touchdowns, and had one reception for another touchdown. Perry later attempted a comeback, playing an unremarkable 1996 season with the London Monarchs of the World League of American Football (later NFL Europa).

== Beyond football ==
=== Music ===
During his popular tenure with the Bears, Perry participated in the recording of three rap records, all in 1985, in addition to the team's popular "Super Bowl Shuffle". Walter Payton and Perry recorded an anti-drug, pro-peace rap tune entitled "Together" which was written by four Evanston, Illinois teens. "Together" was re-released in 1999 with part of the profits going to the Walter Payton Foundation.

=== Media appearances ===
In November 2000 Perry participated in a boxing match against former NFL player Bob Sapp during a Toughman Contest which aired on FX; Perry lost the bout. In 2002, Perry participated in (and lost) a Celebrity Boxing match against 7 ft 7 in (2.31 m) former NBA player Manute Bol.

Perry participated in a World Wrestling Federation battle royal at WrestleMania 2 in Rosemont, Illinois in 1986. In 2006, he returned to the Chicago area to be inducted into the "Celebrity Wing" of the WWE Hall of Fame by John Cena.

In 2003, he appeared in Nathan's Hot Dog Eating Contest as a "celebrity contestant". He stopped eating five minutes into the competition. Also in 2003, he appeared in a TV movie on Comedy Central called Windy City Heat, opposite an aspiring actor named Perry Caravello, who is led to believe he is acting in a major motion picture. He also made a short appearance in the opening of According to Jim (Season 8, Episode 15).

=== Pop culture ===
In 1987, Hasbro produced an action figure of Perry for their G.I. Joe toy line. The Fridge – William "Refrigerator" Perry – was first available in early 1987 as a mail-order offer from Hasbro Direct. He was made available again through 1988, and then again in 1989. The figure had the number 72 emblazoned on his chest (the number Perry wore on his Chicago Bears jersey).

=== Television ===
In 1986, Perry appeared as himself in an episode of The A-Team alongside WWF star Hulk Hogan.

In 1996 he appeared on the British comedy panel show They Think It's All Over as a mystery guest in the show's Feel the Sportsman round.

He also appeared on a 2002 episode of Comedy Central's The Man Show.

== Personal life ==
Perry has been married twice and has four children.

In June 2007, Perry was diagnosed with Guillain–Barré syndrome, a chronic inflammatory disorder of the peripheral nerves. On April 22, 2009, Perry was hospitalized in South Carolina in serious condition due to the disease. Perry spent approximately a month in the hospital before being released. In June 2010, Perry was reported to be suffering from hearing loss which was improving. He had lost more than one hundred pounds (45 kg) while hospitalized in 2009, but by 2010 he had rebounded to 330 lb (150 kg).

In February 2011, ESPN ran a somber article about Perry, citing ongoing health problems, excessive alcohol consumption, and a weight of 400 lb (180 kg).

In April 2011, Cliff Forrest, a 10-year-old child, discovered Perry's Super Bowl ring for sale. With help from his mother he purchased it for $8,500 and returned the ring to Perry. In September 2015, it was reported that Perry's Super Bowl ring had been auctioned off for more than $200,000 by a man Perry had sold it to.

As of October 29, 2014, Perry was confined to his late father's home. Michael Dean Perry, his younger brother and another former NFL defensive lineman, was William's guardian and conservator for his affairs. In January 2016, Perry, weighing more than 425 lb (193 kg), checked himself into the hospital to receive treatment for diabetes. Perry revealed he had no feeling in his feet and was in danger of having his leg amputated. In June 2016, Sports Illustrated reported that Perry was living in a retirement home, had financial difficulties and continued to drink alcohol despite having publicly acknowledged his alcoholism in 2011. However, in 2018, he reported that he was moving around again, and he felt "better than he has in a long time."
