= Super Bowl XX =

1986 edition of the Super Bowl

Chicago Bears (1) (NFC) (15–1)	New England Patriots (5) (AFC) (11–5)
46	10
Head coach: Mike Ditka	Head coach: Raymond Berry
	1	2	3	4	Total
CHI	13	10	21	2	46
NE	3	0	0	7	10
- Date: January 26, 1986
- Kickoff time: 4:20p.m. CST (UTC-6)
- Stadium: Louisiana Superdome; New Orleans, Louisiana
- MVP: Richard Dent, defensive end
- Favorite: Bears by 10
- Referee: Red Cashion
- Attendance: 73,818

Ceremonies
- National anthem: Wynton Marsalis
- Coin toss: Bart Starr representing previous Super Bowl MVPs
- Halftime show: Up with People presents "Beat of the Future"

TV in the United States
- Network: NBC
- Announcers: Dick Enberg, Merlin Olsen, and Bob Griese
- Nielsen ratings: 48.3 (est. 92.57 million viewers)
- Market share: 70
- Cost of 30-second commercial: $550,000

Radio in the United States
- Network: NBC Radio
- Announcers: Don Criqui and Bob Trumpy

Super Bowl XX was an American football game between the National Football Conference (NFC) champion Chicago Bears and the American Football Conference (AFC) champion New England Patriots to decide the National Football League (NFL) champion for the 1985 season. The Bears defeated the Patriots by the score of 46–10, capturing their first (and to date, only) Super Bowl and first NFL championship since 1963, ending a 23-year championship drought for not just the Bears, but the city of Chicago in general. Super Bowl XX was played on January 26, 1986, at the Louisiana Superdome in New Orleans.

This was the fourth Super Bowl and, to date, the last time in which both teams made their Super Bowl debuts. (Note: Presently, this can only occur again if the NFC's Detroit Lions play one of the following AFC teams in the Super Bowl: the Cleveland Browns, Jacksonville Jaguars or Houston Texans. The previous three matchups involving first-time participants were Super Bowl I, Super Bowl III and Super Bowl XVI.) The Bears entered the game after becoming the second team in NFL history to win 15 regular season games. With their then-revolutionary 46 defense, Chicago led the league in several defensive categories, outscored their opponents with a staggering margin of 456–198, and recorded two postseason shutouts. The Patriots were considered a Cinderella team during the 1985 season, and posted an 11–5 regular season record, but entered the playoffs as a wild card because of tiebreakers; defying the odds, New England posted three road playoff wins to advance to Super Bowl XX.

In their victory over the Patriots, the Bears set or tied Super Bowl records for sacks (seven), fewest rushing yards allowed (seven), and margin of victory (36 points). At the time, New England broke the record for the quickest lead in Super Bowl history, with Tony Franklin's 36-yard field goal 1:19 into the first quarter after a Chicago fumble. But the Patriots were eventually held to negative yardage (−19) throughout the entire first half, and finished with just 123 total yards from scrimmage, the second lowest total yards in Super Bowl history, behind the Minnesota Vikings (119 total yards) in Super Bowl IX. Bears defensive end Richard Dent, who had 1.5 quarterback sacks, forced two fumbles, and blocked a pass, was named the game's Most Valuable Player (MVP). Although he posted relatively mediocre game statistics and failed to score a touchdown himself, star running back Walter Payton was also later credited as being a major factor in the Bears' victory on account of the Patriots' heavy coverage of him giving other members of the team more and better opportunities to score.

The telecast of the game on NBC was watched by an estimated 92.57 million viewers. To commemorate the 20th Super Bowl, all previous Super Bowl MVPs were honored during the pregame ceremonies.

== Background ==
=== Host selection process ===
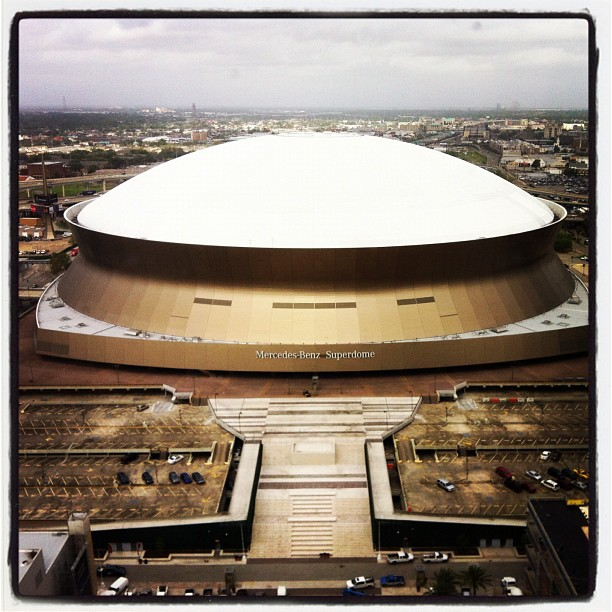
The game was held at the Louisiana Superdome.

NFL owners voted to award Super Bowl XX to New Orleans on December 14, 1982, at the owners' mid-season meeting held in Dallas. This would be the sixth time that New Orleans hosted the Super Bowl. Tulane Stadium was the site of IV, VI, and IX; while the Louisiana Superdome previously hosted XII and XV. Hosts for both XIX and XX would be selected, and potentially XXI as well. A total of ten cities put in bids: Palo Alto (Stanford Stadium), New Orleans (Superdome), Miami (Orange Bowl), Houston (Rice Stadium), Seattle (Kingdome), Detroit (Silverdome), Pasadena (Rose Bowl), Tampa (Tampa Stadium), Anaheim (Anaheim Stadium), and Jacksonville (Gator Bowl). As part of their pitch, the representatives from New Orleans stressed that if they were not selected for XX, due to scheduling conflicts, they would not be able to host the Super Bowl again until 1990. Stanford Stadium was picked for XIX, and Rice Stadium was speculated for XXI, but ultimately no decision was made for that game. Yet again, Miami was rejected, due to the aging condition of the Orange Bowl. A proposed sales tax levy to pay for a new stadium had failed at the ballot box on November 2, further sinking any chances for South Florida.

=== Chicago Bears ===
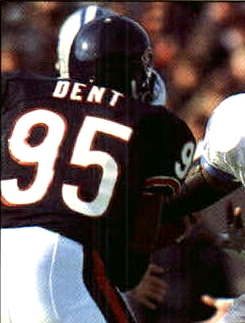
Richard Dent, a key part of the Bears' defense, was named MVP with his performance in Super Bowl XX.

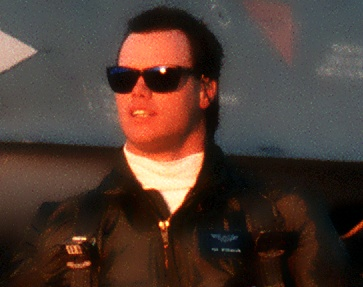
Chicago quarterback Jim McMahon scored two rushing touchdowns in the Super Bowl

Under head coach Mike Ditka, who won the 1985 NFL Coach of the Year Award, the Bears went 15–1 in the regular season, becoming the second NFL team to win 15 regular season games, while outscoring their opponents with a staggering margin of 456–198.

The Bears' defense, the "46 defense", allowed the fewest points (198), fewest total yards (4,135), and fewest rushing yards of any team during the regular season (1,319). They also led the league in interceptions (34) and ranked third in sacks (64).

Pro Bowl quarterback Jim McMahon (who had the best season of his career) provided the team with a solid passing attack, throwing for 2,392 yards and 15 touchdowns (both career highs), while also rushing for 252 yards and three touchdowns. Running back Walter Payton, who was then the NFL's all-time leading rusher with 14,860 yards, rushed for 1,551 yards. He also caught 49 passes for 500 yards, and scored 11 touchdowns. Linebacker Mike Singletary won the NFL Defensive Player of the Year Award by recording three sacks, three fumble recoveries, and one interception.

One of the most distinguishable players on defense was rookie lineman William "The Refrigerator" Perry, who came into training camp before the season weighing over 380 pounds. However, after Bears defensive coordinator Buddy Ryan told the press that the team "wasted" their first round draft pick on him, Perry lost some weight and ended up being an effective defensive tackle, finishing the season with five sacks. He got even more attention when Ditka started putting him in the game at the fullback position during offensive plays near the opponent's goal line. During the regular season, Perry rushed for two touchdowns, caught a pass for another touchdown, and was frequently a lead blocker for Payton during goal line plays.

In addition to Singletary and Perry, the starting 11 in the Bears' "46 defense" were all impact players. The defensive line featured three future Hall of Famers: defensive end Richard Dent led the NFL in sacks (17), while tackle/end Dan Hampton recorded 6.5 sacks, and tackle Steve McMichael compiled eight. Outside linebacker Otis Wilson had 10.5 sacks and three interceptions, with fellow outside linebacker Wilber Marshall adding six sacks and four interceptions. In the secondary, cornerback Leslie Frazier (who would suffer a career-ending knee injury in the game) had six interceptions, cornerback Mike Richardson recorded four interceptions, strong safety Dave Duerson had five interceptions, and free safety Gary Fencik contributed five interceptions and a team-high 118 tackles.

Chicago's main offensive weapon was Payton and the running game. A big reason for Payton's success was fullback Matt Suhey as the primary lead blocker. Suhey was also a good ball carrier, rushing for 471 yards and catching 33 passes for 295 yards. The team's rushing was also aided by Pro Bowlers Jim Covert and Jay Hilgenberg and the rest of the Bears' offensive line including Mark Bortz, Keith Van Horne, and Tom Thayer.

In their passing game, the Bears' primary deep threat was wide receiver Willie Gault, who caught 33 passes for 704 yards, an average of 21.3 yards per catch, and returned 22 kickoffs for 557 yards and a touchdown. Tight end Emery Moorehead was another key contributor, catching 35 passes for 481 yards. Wide receiver Dennis McKinnon was another passing weapon, recording 31 receptions, 555 yards, and seven touchdowns. On special teams, Kevin Butler set a rookie scoring record with 144 points, making 31 of 37 field goals (83%) and 51 of 51 extra points.

Meanwhile, the players brought their characterizations to the national stage with "The Super Bowl Shuffle", a rap song the Bears recorded for which they filmed a music video during the 1985 season. Although it was in essence a novelty song, it peaked at number 41 on the Billboard charts and even received a Grammy Award nomination for Best R&B Performance by a Duo or Group with Vocals in 1987.

=== New England Patriots ===
The Patriots were a Cinderella team during the 1985 season because many sports writers and fans thought they were lucky to make the playoffs at all. New England began the season losing three of their first five games, but won six consecutive games to finish with an 11–5 record. However, the 11–5 mark only earned them third place in the AFC East behind the Miami Dolphins and the New York Jets.

Quarterback Tony Eason, in his third year in the NFL, was inconsistent during the regular season, completing 168 out of 299 passes for 2,156 yards and 11 touchdowns, but also 17 interceptions. His backup, Steve Grogan, was considered one of the best reserve quarterbacks in the league. Grogan was the starter in six of the Patriots' games, and finished the regular season with 85 out of 156 completions for 1,311 yards, 7 touchdowns, and 5 interceptions.

Wide receiver Stanley Morgan provided the team with a deep threat, catching 39 passes for 760 yards and 5 touchdowns. On the other side of the field, wide receiver Irving Fryar was equally effective, catching 39 passes for 670 yards, while also rushing for 27 yards, gaining another 559 yards returning punts and kickoffs, and scoring 10 touchdowns. But like the Bears, the Patriots' main strength on offense was their rushing attack. Halfback Craig James rushed for 1,227 yards, caught 27 passes for 370 yards, and scored 7 touchdowns. Fullback Tony Collins rushed for 657 yards, recorded a team-leading 52 receptions for 549 yards, and scored 5 touchdowns. The Patriots also had an outstanding offensive line, led by Pro Bowl tackle Brian Holloway and future Hall of Fame guard John Hannah.

New England's defense ranked 5th in the league in fewest yards allowed (5,048). Pro Bowl linebacker Andre Tippett led the AFC with 16.5 sacks and recovered 3 fumbles. Pro Bowl linebacker Steve Nelson was also a big defensive weapon, excelling at pass coverage and run stopping. Also, the Patriots' secondary only gave up 14 touchdown passes during the season, second fewest in the league. Pro Bowl defensive back Raymond Clayborn recorded 6 interceptions for 80 return yards and 1 touchdown, while Pro Bowler Fred Marion had 7 interceptions for 189 return yards.

=== Playoffs ===
In the playoffs, the Patriots qualified as the AFC's second wild card.

But the Patriots, under head coach Raymond Berry, defied the odds, beating the New York Jets 26–14, Los Angeles Raiders 27–20, and the Dolphins 31–14 – all on the road – to make it to the Super Bowl. The win against Miami had been especially surprising, not only because Miami was the only team to beat Chicago in the season, but also because New England had not won in the Orange Bowl (Miami's then-home field) since 1966, the Dolphins' first season (then in the AFL). The Patriots had lost to Miami there 18 consecutive times, including a 30–27 loss in their 15th game of the season. But New England dominated the Dolphins in the AFC Championship Game, recording two interceptions from quarterback Dan Marino and recovering 4 fumbles. New England remains the only team to finish third in their division and qualify for the Super Bowl in the same season.

Meanwhile, the Bears became the first and only team in NFL history to shut out both of their opponents in the playoffs, beating the New York Giants 21–0 and the Los Angeles Rams 24–0.

=== Super Bowl pregame news ===
Much of the Super Bowl pregame hype centered on Bears quarterback Jim McMahon. First, he was fined by the NFL during the playoffs for a violation of the league's dress code, wearing a head band from Adidas. He then started to wear a head band where he hand-wrote "Rozelle", after then-league commissioner Pete Rozelle.

McMahon suffered a strained glute as the result of a hit taken in the NFC Championship Game and flew his acupuncturist into New Orleans to get treatment. During practice four days before the Super Bowl, he wore a headband reading "Acupuncture". During a Bears practice before the Super Bowl, McMahon mooned a helicopter that was hovering over the practice.

Another anecdote involving McMahon during the Super Bowl anticipation involved WDSU sports anchor Buddy Diliberto reporting a quote attributed to McMahon, where he had allegedly referred to the women of New Orleans as "sluts" on a local morning sports talk show. This caused wide controversy among the women of New Orleans and McMahon began receiving calls from irate fans in his hotel. A groggy McMahon, who had not been able to sleep well because of all the calls he had gotten, was confronted by Mike Ditka later that morning and denied making the statement, saying he would not have even been awake to make the comment when he was said to have done so. He was supported in his claim by WLS reporter Les Grobstein, who was present when the alleged statements were made. WDSU would later retract the statement, have an on-air apology read by the station's general manager during the noon newscast on January 23, and suspend Diliberto.

As the designated home team in the annual rotation between AFC and NFC teams, the Patriots wore their red jerseys with white pants, even though they wore white jerseys with red pants for all home games during the regular season. New England made the switch for the Super Bowl after winning vs. the Jets and Dolphins wearing red jerseys. The Bears donned their road white uniforms with navy pants.

== Broadcasting ==
The game was broadcast in the United States by NBC, with play-by-play announcer Dick Enberg, and color commentators Merlin Olsen and Bob Griese. Griese worked in a separate booth from Enberg and Olsen. Bob Costas and his NFL '85 castmates, Ahmad Rashad and Pete Axthelm anchored the pregame, halftime and postgame coverage. Other contributors included Charlie Jones (recapping Super Bowl I), Larry King (interviewing Mike Ditka and Raymond Berry), and Bill Macatee (profiling Patriots owner Billy Sullivan and his family). The pregame coverage also included a skit featuring comedian Rodney Dangerfield, an interview by NBC Nightly News anchor Tom Brokaw of United States President Ronald Reagan at the White House (this would not become a regular Super Bowl pregame feature until Super Bowl XLIII, when Today show host Matt Lauer interviewed U.S. President Barack Obama) and a concept devised by then-NBC Sports executive Michael Weisman which became known as the "Silent Minute," a one-minute countdown featuring a black screen with a digital clock which morphed into Roman numerals when it reached twenty seconds remaining and accompanied by Leroy Anderson's "The Syncopated Clock."

The national radio broadcast was aired by NBC Radio, which outbid CBS Radio for the nationwide NFL contract in March 1985. Don Criqui was the play-by-play announcer, with Bob Trumpy as the color analyst. WGN-AM carried the game in the Chicago area (and thanks to WGN's 50,000-watt clear-channel signal, to much of the continental United States), with Wayne Larrivee on play-by-play, and Jim Hart and Dick Butkus providing commentary. WEEI carried the game in the Boston area, with John Carlson and Jon Morris on the call.

NBC's broadcast garnered the third highest Nielsen rating of any Super Bowl to date at 48.3, but it ended up being the first Super Bowl to garner over 90 million viewers, the highest ever at that time.

The series premiere of The Last Precinct was NBC's Super Bowl lead-out program.

Super Bowl XX was simulcast in Canada on CTV and broadcast on Channel 4 in the United Kingdom. Canal 5 also had the game in Mexico, with play-by-play announcers Toño de Valdés, Enrique Burak and color commentator Pepe Segarra. This was the first Super Bowl that this long lasting trio ever called together.

Super Bowl XX is featured on NFL's Greatest Games under the title Super Bears with narration by Don LaFontaine.

== Entertainment ==
This was the first year that the NFL itself implemented the pregame entertainment. The pregame entertainment show began after the players left the field and ended with kick-off. Lesslee Fitzmorris created and directed the show. To celebrate the 20th Super Bowl game, the Most Valuable Players of the previous Super Bowls were featured during the pregame festivities. The number one song of the year coupled with video plays from each Super Bowl accompanied the presentation of each player. Performers formed the score of each championship game. The show concluded with the question of who would be the next Super Bowl Champions. This would start a tradition occurring every ten years (in Super Bowls XXX, XL, 50 and LX) in which past Super Bowl MVPs would be honored before the game.

After trumpeter Wynton Marsalis performed the national anthem, Bart Starr, MVP of Super Bowl I and Super Bowl II, tossed the coin.

The performance event group Up with People performed during the halftime show titled "Beat of the Future". Up with People dancers portrayed various scenes into the future. This was the last Super Bowl to feature Up with People as a halftime show, though they later performed in the Super Bowl XXV pregame show. The halftime show was dedicated to the memory of Dr. Martin Luther King Jr. (the first observance of Martin Luther King Jr. Day had been held the previous Monday).

== Game summary ==
=== First quarter ===
The Patriots took the then-quickest lead in Super Bowl history after linebacker Larry McGrew recovered a fumble by running back Walter Payton at the Bears 19-yard line on the second play of the game (the Bears themselves would break this record in Super Bowl XLI when Devin Hester ran back the opening kickoff for a touchdown). Bears quarterback Jim McMahon took responsibility for this fumble after the game, saying he had called the wrong play which left Payton alone with no blockers. This set up kicker Tony Franklin's 36-yard field goal 1:19 into the first quarter after three incomplete passes by quarterback Tony Eason (during the first of those three, tight end Lin Dawson went down with torn ligaments in his knee). "I looked up at the message board", said Chicago linebacker Mike Singletary, "and it said that 15 of the 19 teams that scored first won the game. I thought, yeah, but none of those 15 had ever played the Bears." Chicago struck back with a 7-play, 59-yard drive, featuring a 43-yard pass completion from McMahon to wide receiver Willie Gault, to set up kicker Kevin Butler's 28-yard field goal, tying the score at 3–3.

After both teams traded punts, defensive end Richard Dent and defensive tackle Steve McMichael forced a fumble on Eason that was recovered by defensive tackle Dan Hampton on the New England 13-yard line. Chicago then drove to the 3-yard line, but had to settle for a 24-yard field goal by Butler after defensive tackle William "The Refrigerator" Perry was tackled for a 1-yard loss while trying to throw his first NFL pass on a halfback option play. The score gave Chicago their first lead of the game, 6–3, and they would never trail New England again. On the Patriots' ensuing drive, Dent forced a fumble on running back Craig James, which was recovered by Singletary at the 13-yard line. Two plays later, Bears fullback Matt Suhey scored on an 11-yard touchdown run to increase the lead to 13–3.

New England took the ensuing kickoff and ran one play before the first quarter ended, which resulted in positive yardage for the first time in the game (a 3-yard run by James). James, who earlier gained 258 total rushing yards in the three AFC playoff games, only managed to gain one yard on five rushing attempts in the Super Bowl.

=== Second quarter ===
After an incomplete pass and a tackle for a 4-yard loss by Hampton on tight end Greg Hawthorne, the Patriots had to send in punter Rich Camarillo again, and wide receiver Keith Ortego returned the ball 12 yards to the 41-yard line. The Bears subsequently drove 59 yards in 10 plays, featuring a 24-yard reception by Suhey, to score on McMahon's 2-yard touchdown run to increase their lead, 20–3. After the ensuing kickoff, New England lost 13 yards in 3 plays and had to punt again, but got the ball back with great field position when linebacker Don Blackmon stripped the ball from Suhey and cornerback Raymond Clayborn recovered the fumble at the New England 46. During the punt, Ortego forgot what the play call was for the punt return, and the ensuing chaos resulted in him being penalized for handing off a fair catch to cornerback Leslie Frazier, who then suffered a career-ending knee injury while being tackled by Hawthorne.

Patriots head coach Raymond Berry then replaced Eason with Steve Grogan, who had spent the previous week hoping he would have the opportunity to step onto the NFL's biggest stage. "I probably won't get a chance", he had told reporters a few days before the game. "I just hope I can figure out some way to get on the field. I could come in on the punt-block team and stand behind the line and wave my arms, or something." But on his first drive, Grogan could only lead the Patriots to the Chicago 37-yard line, and they decided to punt rather than risk a long field goal attempt. The Bears then marched 72 yards in 11 plays, which included a 29-yard reception by wide receiver Ken Margerum, moving the ball inside the Patriots' 10-yard line. New England kept Chicago out of the end zone, but Butler kicked a 24-yard field goal on the last play of the half to give the Bears a 23–3 halftime lead.

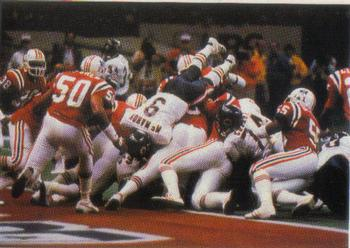
Bears quarterback Jim McMahon scoring one of his two rushing touchdowns in Super Bowl XX.

The end of the first half was controversial. With 21 seconds left, McMahon scrambled to the Patriots' 3-yard line and was stopped inbounds. With the clock ticking down, players from both teams were fighting, and the Bears were forced to snap the ball before the officials formally put it back into play, allowing McMahon to throw the ball out of bounds and stop the clock with three seconds left. The Bears were penalized five yards for delay of game, but according to NFL rules, 10 seconds should have also been run off the clock during such a deliberate clock-stopping attempt in the final two minutes of a half. In addition, a flag should have been thrown for fighting (also according to NFL rules). This would have likely resulted in offsetting penalties, which would still allow for a field goal attempt. Meanwhile, the non-call on the illegal snap was promptly acknowledged by the officials and reported by NBC sportscasters during halftime, but the resulting field goal was not taken away from the Bears (because of this instance, the NFL instructed officials to strictly enforce the 10-second run-off rule at the start of the 1986 season).

The Bears had dominated New England in the first half, holding them to twenty-one offensive plays (only four of which resulted in positive yardage), −19 total offensive yards, two pass completions, one first down, and three points. While Eason was in the game, the totals were six possessions, one play of positive yardage out of fifteen plays, no first downs, three points, three punts, three turnovers, no pass completions, and -36 yards of total offense. Meanwhile, Chicago gained 236 yards and scored 23 points themselves.

=== Third quarter ===
After the Patriots received the second-half kickoff, they managed to get one first down, but then had to punt after Grogan was sacked twice, first by Dent for 5 yards, then by linebacker Otis Wilson for 10. Camarillo, who punted four times in the first half, managed to pin the Bears back at their own 4-yard line with a then-Super Bowl record 62-yard punt. But the Patriots' defense still could not stop the Bears' offense. On the first play, McMahon faked a handoff to Payton, then threw a 60-yard completion to Gault from his own end zone, followed by a 19-yard pass to tight end Emery Moorehead. Seven plays later, McMahon finished the Super Bowl-record 96-yard drive with a 1-yard touchdown run to increase Chicago's lead to 30–3. On the third play of the Patriots' second drive of the quarter, Grogan threw a pass that was tipped by tight end Derrick Ramsey and intercepted by Bears cornerback Reggie Phillips (who filled in for Frazier), who returned it 28 yards for a touchdown to increase the lead to 37–3.

On the second play of their ensuing possession, the Patriots turned the ball over yet again when wide receiver Cedric Jones lost a fumble after catching a 19-yard pass from Grogan and taking a hit by safety Gary Fencik, and linebacker Wilber Marshall returned the fumble 13 yards to New England's 37-yard line. Five plays later, McMahon's 27-yard pass to wide receiver Dennis Gentry moved the ball to the 1-yard line, setting up perhaps the most memorable moment of the game. Perry lined up as the running back in a power-I formation and scored on a 1-yard touchdown run, as he had done twice in the regular season. His touchdown (while plowing over McGrew in the process) made the score 44–3 in favor of Chicago. The Bears' three touchdowns is still a Super Bowl third quarter record for most points scored, while their 41-point lead is the record for largest margin going into the fourth quarter.

Perry's unexpected touchdown cost Las Vegas sports books hundreds of thousands of dollars in losses from prop bets.

=== Fourth quarter ===
The Patriots finally reached the end zone early in the fourth quarter, advancing the ball 76 yards in 12 plays and scoring on an 8-yard fourth-down touchdown pass from Grogan to wide receiver Irving Fryar. The Bears' defense dominated the Patriots for the rest of the game, and recorded a forced fumble by defensive back Shaun Gayle on Ramsey that was recovered by Singletary, followed by a 46-yard interception return to the New England 5-yard line by linebacker Jim Morrissey. The Bears then turned the ball over on downs, but nevertheless capitalized on Morrissey's interception when defensive lineman Henry Waechter tackled Grogan in the end zone for a safety to make the final score 46–10. After both teams exchanged punts, Chicago reached midfield to run out the clock and claim their first Super Bowl title.

One oddity in the Bears' victory was that Payton had a relatively poor performance running the football and did not score a touchdown in Super Bowl XX, his only Super Bowl appearance during his Hall of Fame career. Many people including Mike Ditka have claimed that the reason for this was due to the fact that the Patriots' defensive scheme was centered on stopping Payton. Although Payton was ultimately the Bears' leading rusher during the game, the Patriots' defense held him to only 61 yards on 22 carries, with his longest run being only 7 yards. He was given several opportunities to score near the goal line, but New England stopped him every time before he reached the end zone (such as his 2-yard loss from the New England 3-yard line a few plays before Butler's second field goal, and his 2-yard run from the 4-yard line right before McMahon's first rushing touchdown). Thus, Ditka opted to go for other plays to counter the Patriots' defense. Ditka has since stated that his biggest regret of his career was not creating a scoring opportunity for Payton during the game.

McMahon, who completed 12 out of 20 passes for 256 yards, became the first quarterback to score two rushing touchdowns in the Super Bowl. Gault finished the game with 129 receiving yards on just 4 receptions, an average of 32.3 yards per catch. He also gained 49 yards on four kickoff returns. The Patriots had the opening kickoff, two on scores and the last a free kick following the safety. Suhey had 11 carries for 52 yards rushing and a touchdown, and caught a pass for 24 yards. Singletary tied a Super Bowl record with 2 fumble recoveries.

Eason became the first Super Bowl starting quarterback without a pass completion, finishing 0 for 6 with no interceptions. Grogan completed 17 out of 30 passes for 177 yards, one touchdown, and two interceptions. Although fullback Tony Collins was the Patriots' leading rusher, he was limited to just 4 yards on 3 carries, and caught 2 passes for 19 yards. New England receiver wide Stephen Starring returned 7 kickoffs for 153 yards and caught 2 passes for 39 yards. The Patriots, as a team, only recorded 123 total offensive yards, the second-lowest total in Super Bowl history.

=== Box score ===
Super Bowl XX: Chicago Bears 46, New England Patriots 10

Quarter	1	2	3	4	Total
Bears (NFC)	13	10	21	2	46
Patriots (AFC)	3	0	0	7	10

at Louisiana Superdome, New Orleans, Louisiana

- Date: January 26, 1986
- Game time: 4:21 p.m. CST
- Game weather: 70 °F (21 °C), played indoors, domed stadium

Scoring summary

Quarter	Time	Drive			Team	Scoring information	Score	
Quarter	Time	Plays	Yards	TOP	Team	Scoring information	CHI	NE
1	13:41	4	0	0:20	NE	36-yard field goal by Tony Franklin	0	3
1	9:20	8	59	4:21	CHI	28-yard field goal by Kevin Butler	3	3
1	1:26	7	7	3:51	CHI	24-yard field goal by Butler	6	3
1	0:23	2	13	0:47	CHI	Matt Suhey 11-yard touchdown run, Butler kick good	13	3
2	7:24	10	59	6:37	CHI	Jim McMahon 2-yard touchdown run, Butler kick good	20	3
2	0:00	11	72	2:58	CHI	24-yard field goal by Butler	23	3
3	7:22	9	96	5:05	CHI	McMahon 1-yard touchdown run, Butler kick good	30	3
3	6:16	—	—	—	CHI	Interception returned 28 yards for touchdown by Reggie Phillips, Butler kick good	37	3
3	3:22	6	37	2:21	CHI	William Perry 1-yard touchdown run, Butler kick good	44	3
4	13:14	12	76	5:08	NE	Irving Fryar 8-yard touchdown reception from Steve Grogan, Franklin kick good	44	10
4	5:36	—	—	—	CHI	Grogan tackled in end zone for a safety by Henry Waechter	46	10
"TOP" = time of possession. For other American football terms, see Glossary of American football.							46	10

== Final statistics ==
Sources: NFL.com Super Bowl XX, USA Today Super Bowl XX Play by Play, Super Bowl XX Play Finder Chi, Super Bowl XX Play Finder NE

=== Statistical comparison ===
	Chicago Bears	New England Patriots
First downs	23	12
First downs rushing	13	1
First downs passing	9	10
First downs penalty	1	1
Third down efficiency	7/14	1/10
Fourth down efficiency	0/1	1/1
Net yards rushing	167	7
Rushing attempts	49	11
Yards per rush	3.4	0.6
Passing – Completions/attempts	12/24	17/36
Times sacked-total yards	3–15	7–61
Interceptions thrown	0	2
Net yards passing	241	116
Total net yards	408	123
Punt returns-total yards	2–20	2–22
Kickoff returns-total yards	4–49	7–153
Interceptions-total return yards	2–75	0–0
Punts-average yardage	4–43.3	6–43.8
Fumbles-lost	3–2	4–4
Penalties-total yards	7–40	5–35
Time of possession	39:15	20:45
Turnovers	2	6

=== Individual statistics ===
Bears passing
	C/ATT^{1}	Yds	TD	INT	Rating
Jim McMahon	12/20	256	0	0	104.2
Steve Fuller	0/4	0	0	0	39.6
Mike Tomczak	0/0	0	0	0	N/A
Bears rushing
	Car^{2}	Yds	TD	LG^{3}	Yds/Car
Walter Payton	22	61	0	7	2.77
Matt Suhey	11	52	1	11	4.73
Thomas Sanders	4	15	0	10	3.75
Dennis Gentry	3	15	0	8	5.00
Jim McMahon	5	14	2	7	2.80
Calvin Thomas	2	8	0	7	4.00
Steve Fuller	1	1	0	1	1.00
William Perry	1	1	1	1	1.00
Bears receiving
	Rec^{4}	Yds	TD	LG^{3}	Target^{5}
Willie Gault	4	129	0	60	4
Dennis Gentry	2	41	0	27	3
Ken Margerum	2	36	0	29	3
Emery Moorehead	2	22	0	14	3
Matt Suhey	1	24	0	24	1
Calvin Thomas	1	4	0	4	2
Walter Payton	0	0	0	0	3
Tim Wrightman	0	0	0	0	2
Dennis McKinnon	0	0	0	0	1

Patriots passing
	C/ATT^{1}	Yds	TD	INT	Rating
Steve Grogan	17/30	177	1	2	57.2
Tony Eason	0/6	0	0	0	39.6
Patriots rushing
	Car^{2}	Yds	TD	LG^{3}	Yds/Car
Tony Collins	3	4	0	3	1.33
Steve Grogan	1	3	0	3	3.00
Robert Weathers	1	3	0	3	3.00
Craig James	5	1	0	3	0.20
Greg Hawthorne	1	–4	0	–4	–4.00
Patriots receiving
	Rec^{4}	Yds	TD	LG^{3}	Target^{5}
Stanley Morgan	6	51	0	16	12
Stephen Starring	2	39	0	24	6
Irving Fryar	2	24	1	16	4
Tony Collins	2	19	0	11	2
Derrick Ramsey	2	16	0	11	4
Cedric Jones	1	19	0	19	1
Craig James	1	6	0	6	2
Robert Weathers	1	3	0	3	1
Lin Dawson	0	0	0	0	1
Mosi Tatupu	0	0	0	0	1

^{1}Completions/attempts ^{2}Carries ^{3}Long gain ^{4}Receptions ^{5}Times targeted

=== Records set ===
The following records were set in Super Bowl XX, according to the official NFL.com boxscore and the Pro-Football-Reference.com game summary.

Player records set
Special Teams
Most kickoff returns, game	7	Stephen Starring (New England)
Longest punt	62 yards	Rich Camarillo (New England)
Records tied
Most rushing touchdowns, game	2	Jim McMahon (Chicago)
Most fumbles recovered, game	2	Mike Singletary (Chicago)
Most fumbles recovered, career	2	Mike Singletary (Chicago)
Most interceptions returned for touchdown, game	1	Reggie Phillips (Chicago)
Most safeties, game	1	Henry Waechter (Chicago)
Most (one point) extra points, game	5	Kevin Butler (Chicago)

Team records set
Points
Most points, game	46 points	Bears
Largest margin of victory	36 points	Bears
Most points scored, second half	23 points	Bears
Most points, third quarter	21 points	Bears
Largest lead, end of 3rd quarter	41 points	Bears
Touchdowns
Longest touchdown scoring drive	96 yards	Bears
Rushing
Fewest rushing yards (net)	7	Patriots
Lowest average gain per rush attempt	0.64	Patriots
Most rushing touchdowns	4	Bears
First downs
Fewest first downs rushing	1	Patriots
Records tied
Most points scored in any quarter of play	21 points (3rd)	Bears
Largest halftime margin	20 points	Bears
Most touchdowns, game	5	Bears
Most (one point) PATs	5	Bears
Most Safeties, Game	1	Bears
Fewest passing touchdowns	0	Bears
Most touchdowns scored by interception return	1	Bears
Fewest rushing touchdowns	0	Patriots
Most times sacked	7	Patriots
Most fumbles lost, game	4	Patriots
Most kickoff returns, game	7	Patriots

Records set, both team totals
	Total	Bears	Patriots
Points, Both Teams
Most points, third quarter	21 points	21	0
Passing, Both Teams
Most times sacked	10	3	7
Records tied, both team totals
Most field goals made	4	3	1
Most rushing touchdowns	4	4	0
Most fumbles lost	6	2	4
Most kickoff returns	11	4	7

== Starting lineups ==
Hall of Fame‡

Chicago	Position	Position	New England
Offense
Willie Gault	WR		Stanley Morgan
Jim Covert‡	LT		Brian Holloway
Mark Bortz	LG		John Hannah‡
Jay Hilgenberg	C		Pete Brock
Tom Thayer	RG		Ron Wooten
Keith Van Horne	RT		Steve Moore
Emery Moorehead	TE		Lin Dawson
Dennis McKinnon	WR		Stephen Starring
Jim McMahon	QB		Tony Eason
Matt Suhey	FB		Tony Collins
Walter Payton‡	RB		Craig James
Defense
Dan Hampton‡	LE		Garin Veris
Steve McMichael‡	LDT	NT	Lester Williams
William Perry	RDT	RE	Julius Adams
Richard Dent‡	RE	LOLB	Andre Tippett‡
Otis Wilson	LLB	LILB	Steve Nelson
Mike Singletary‡	MLB	RILB	Larry McGrew
Wilber Marshall	RLB	ROLB	Don Blackmon
Mike Richardson	LCB		Ronnie Lippett
Leslie Frazier	RCB		Raymond Clayborn
Dave Duerson	SS		Roland James
Gary Fencik	FS		Fred Marion

== Officials ==
- Referee: Red Cashion #43 first Super Bowl
- Umpire: Ron Botchan #110 first Super Bowl
- Head linesman: Dale Williams #8 first Super Bowl
- Line judge: Alabama Glass #15 first Super Bowl
- Back judge: Al Jury #106 first Super Bowl
- Side judge: Bob Rice #80 second Super Bowl (XVI)
- Field judge: Jack Vaughan #93 first Super Bowl

== Aftermath ==
The nation's recognition of the Bears' accomplishment was overshadowed by the destruction of the Space Shuttle Challenger shortly after launch on the STS 51-L mission two days later, an event which caused the cancellation of the Bears' post-Super Bowl White House visit. Jim McMahon drew controversy after Super Bowl XXXI by wearing a Bears jersey to the Green Bay Packers' visit following their championship, owing to his first official visit never having happened at the time. Twenty-five years after the championship, the surviving members of the team would be invited to the White House in 2011 by President Barack Obama, a Chicago Bears fan.
