= Paul Fairchild =

American football player (born 1961)

No. 66
- Positions: Guard, center

Personal information
- Born: September 14, 1961 (age 65); Carroll, Iowa, U.S.
- Listed height: 6 ft 4 in (1.93 m)
- Listed weight: 270 lb (122 kg)

Career information
- High school: Glidden–Ralston (Glidden, Iowa)
- College: Kansas
- NFL draft: 1984: 5th round, 124th overall pick

Career history
- New England Patriots (1984–1990)

Career NFL statistics
- Games played: 83
- Games started: 38
- Stats at Pro Football Reference

Paul Jay Fairchild (born September 14, 1961) is an American former professional football player who was a guard for seven seasons with the New England Patriots of the National Football League (NFL). He played college football for the Kansas Jayhawks.

Fairchild grew up in Glidden, Iowa, where he played football for the Wildcats at Glidden-Ralston High School.
