= Glidden, Iowa =

- City
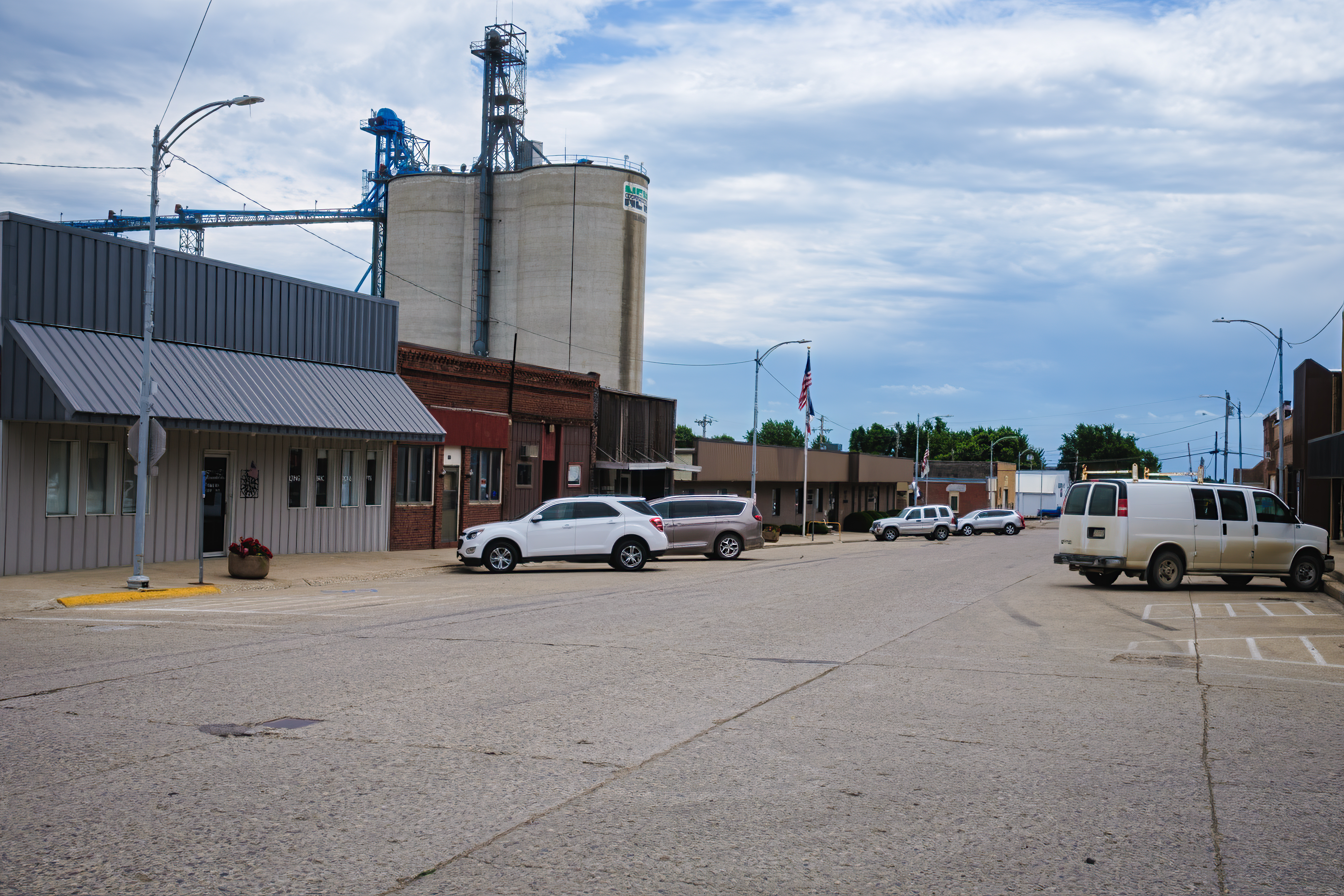
- North Idaho Street in Glidden

- Location of Glidden, Iowa
- Coordinates: 42°03′28″N 94°43′36″W
- Country: USA
- State: Iowa
- County: Carroll

Area
  - Total: 1.10 sq mi (2.84 km^{2})
  - Land: 1.10 sq mi (2.84 km^{2})
  - Water: 0 sq mi (0.00 km^{2})
- Elevation: 1,227 ft (374 m)

Population (2020)
  - Total: 1,151
  - Density: 1,049.3/sq mi (405.13/km^{2})
- Time zone: UTC-6 (Central (CST))
  - Summer (DST): UTC-5 (CDT)
- ZIP code: 51443
- Area code: 712
- FIPS code: 19-31395
- GNIS feature ID: 2394917
- Website: www.cityofglidden.org

Glidden is a town in Carroll County, Iowa, United States. The population was 1,151 at the time of the 2020 census.

== History ==
Glidden was laid out as a town in 1866. It was named either for Capt. W. T. Glidden, a railroad promoter, or in honor of Joseph Farwell Glidden, the inventor of barbed wire.

== Geography ==
According to the United States Census Bureau, the city has a total area of 1.11 square miles (2.87 km^{2}), all land.

== Demographics ==
Historical populations
Year	Pop.	±%
1870	177	—
1880	584	+229.9%
1890	532	−8.9%
1900	733	+37.8%
1910	850	+16.0%
1920	867	+2.0%
1930	854	−1.5%
1940	941	+10.2%
1950	996	+5.8%
1960	993	−0.3%
1970	964	−2.9%
1980	1,076	+11.6%
1990	1,099	+2.1%
2000	1,253	+14.0%
2010	1,146	−8.5%
2020	1,151	+0.4%
Source:"U.S. Census website". United States Census Bureau. Archived from the original on July 9, 2021. and Iowa Data Center; Source: U.S. Decennial Census

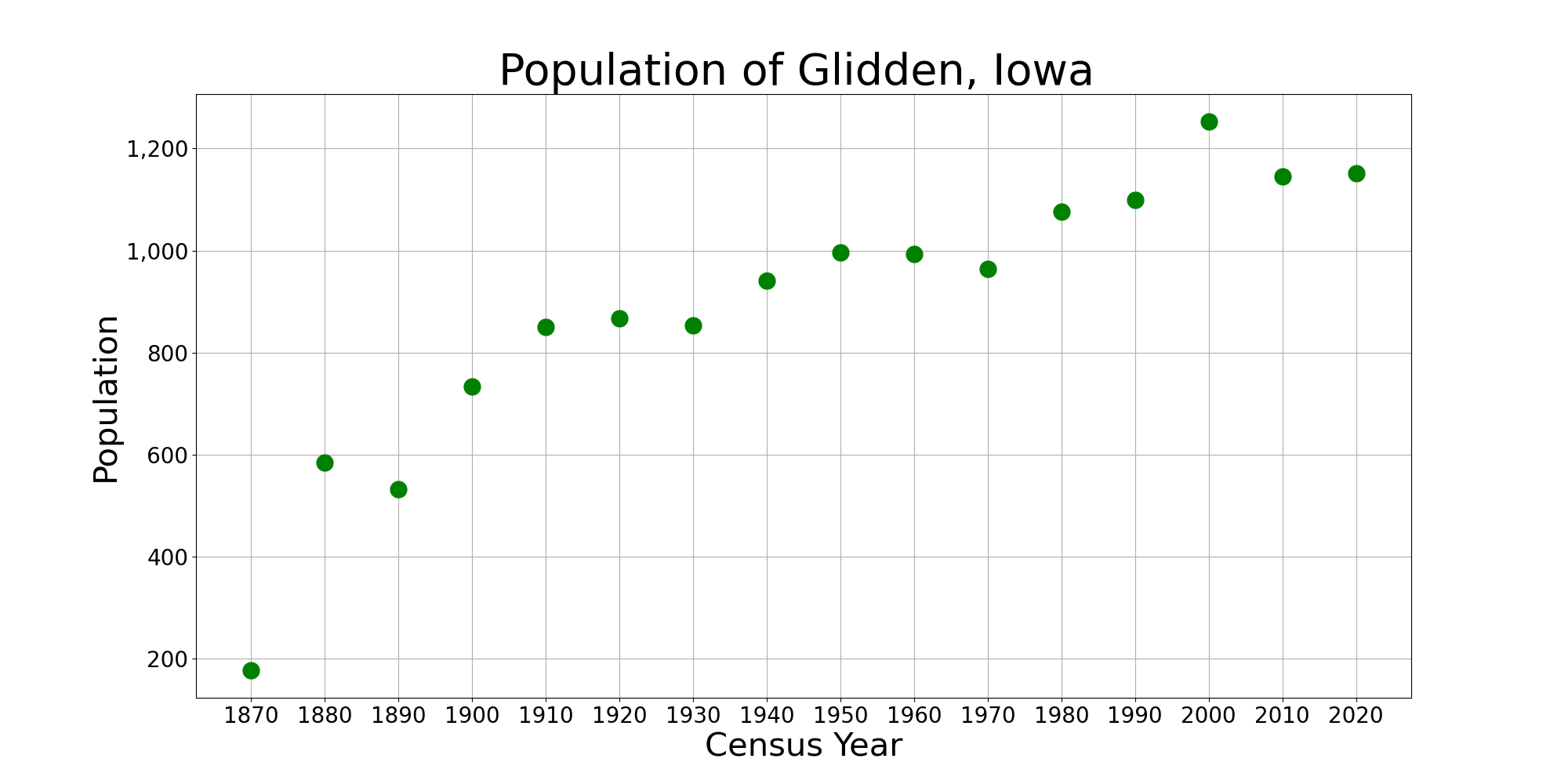
The population of Glidden, Iowa from US census data

=== 2020 census ===
As of the 2020 census, there were 1,151 people, 487 households, and 320 families residing in the city. The population density was 1,049.3 inhabitants per square mile (405.1/km^{2}). There were 518 housing units at an average density of 472.2 per square mile (182.3/km^{2}).

Racial composition as of the 2020 census
Race	Number	Percent
White	1,114	96.8%
Black or African American	0	0.0%
American Indian and Alaska Native	3	0.3%
Asian	0	0.0%
Native Hawaiian and Other Pacific Islander	0	0.0%
Some other race	19	1.7%
Two or more races	15	1.3%
Hispanic or Latino (of any race)	28	2.4%

0.0% of residents lived in urban areas, while 100.0% lived in rural areas.

Of the 487 households, 27.7% had children under the age of 18 living with them, 54.0% were married couples living together, 6.4% were cohabitating couples, 21.4% had a female householder with no spouse or partner present, and 18.3% had a male householder with no spouse or partner present. 34.3% of all households were non-families. 29.2% of all households were made up of individuals, and 13.3% had someone living alone who was 65 years old or older.

The median age in the city was 42.7 years. 24.7% of residents were under the age of 20; 5.9% were between the ages of 20 and 24; 22.0% were from 25 to 44; 26.8% were from 45 to 64; and 20.7% were 65 years of age or older. 22.4% of residents were under the age of 18. The gender makeup of the city was 49.7% male and 50.3% female. For every 100 females, there were 98.8 males, and for every 100 females age 18 and over there were 93.7 males.

There were 518 housing units, of which 6.0% were vacant. The homeowner vacancy rate was 0.8% and the rental vacancy rate was 8.7%.

=== 2010 census ===
As of the census of 2010, there were 1,146 people, 502 households, and 327 families living in the city. The population density was 1,032.4 inhabitants per square mile (398.6/km^{2}). There were 523 housing units at an average density of 471.2 per square mile (181.9/km^{2}). The racial makeup of the city was 99.0% White, 0.6% Native American, 0.1% Asian, and 0.3% from two or more races. Hispanic or Latino of any race were 0.6% of the population.

There were 502 households, of which 29.3% had children under the age of 18 living with them, 54.4% were married couples living together, 8.0% had a female householder with no husband present, 2.8% had a male householder with no wife present, and 34.9% were non-families. 30.5% of all households were made up of individuals, and 15.7% had someone living alone who was 65 years of age or older. The average household size was 2.26 and the average family size was 2.82.

The median age in the city was 44.8 years. 23.3% of residents were under the age of 18; 6.2% were between the ages of 18 and 24; 20.8% were from 25 to 44; 33.1% were from 45 to 64; and 16.5% were 65 years of age or older. The gender makeup of the city was 48.8% male and 51.2% female.

=== 2000 census ===
As of the census of 2000, there were 1,253 people, 481 households, and 303 families living in the city. The population density was 1,231.6 inhabitants per square mile (475.5/km^{2}). There were 517 housing units at an average density of 508.2 per square mile (196.2/km^{2}). The racial makeup of the city was 99.20% White, 0.08% African American, 0.24% Native American, 0.16% Asian, and 0.32% from two or more races. Hispanic or Latino of any race were 0.24% of the population.

There were 481 households, out of which 30.8% had children under the age of 18 living with them, 53.4% were married couples living together, 6.9% had a female householder with no husband present, and 36.8% were non-families. 32.6% of all households were made up of individuals, and 17.7% had someone living alone who was 65 years of age or older. The average household size was 2.34 and the average family size was 3.00.

23.6% are under the age of 18, 8.0% from 18 to 24, 27.6% from 25 to 44, 24.5% from 45 to 64, and 16.3% who were 65 years of age or older. The median age was 40 years. For every 100 females, there were 87.0 males. For every 100 females age 18 and over, there were 87.6 males.

The median income for a household in the city was $35,333, and the median income for a family was $48,026. Males had a median income of $30,152 versus $21,914 for females. The per capita income for the city was $17,437. 5.7% of the population and 3.7% of families are living below the poverty line. Out of the total population, 4.9% of those under the age of 18 and 1.9% of those 65 and older are below the poverty line.

== Education ==
The Glidden–Ralston Community School District consists of a combined elementary, middle and high school housed in one building. The school serves students from Glidden and the neighboring city of Ralston.

== Notable people ==
- Al Epperly (1918–2003), pitcher for Chicago Cubs
- Merle Hay (1896–1917), one of the first three American servicemen to die in World War I
- Ralph G. Neppel (1923–1987), recipient of the Medal of Honor
