= Fred DeRiggi =

American football player (born 1967)

No. 71
- Position: Nose tackle

Personal information
- Born: January 15, 1967 (age 59); Scranton, Pennsylvania, U.S.
- Listed height: 6 ft 2 in (1.88 m)
- Listed weight: 265 lb (120 kg)

Career information
- High school: West Scranton (Scranton)
- College: Syracuse (1986–1989)
- NFL draft: 1990: 7th round, 181st overall pick

Career history
- Buffalo Bills (1990)*; New England Patriots (1990–1991)
- * Offseason or practice squad member only

Career NFL statistics
- Games played: 2
- Stats at Pro Football Reference

Fred John DeRiggi (born January 15, 1967) is an American former professional football nose tackle who played for the New England Patriots of the National Football League (NFL). He played college football for the Syracuse Orange.

== Early life ==
DeRiggi was born on January 15, 1967, in Scranton, Pennsylvania. He attended West Scranton High School in Scranton, where he played football at fullback and defensive end. On January 5, 1985, DeRiggi committed to play college football at Syracuse University.

== College career ==
DeRiggi played college football for the Syracuse Orange from 1985 to 1989 and was a two-year letterman from 1988 to 1989. In his junior year, he had 32 tackles and one sack after taking over the starting nose guard position. The following season, DeRiggi logged 67 tackles and 2.5 sacks.

== Professional career ==
=== Buffalo Bills ===
DeRiggi was selected in the seventh round, with the 181st overall selection, by the Buffalo Bills in the 1990 NFL draft. On July 28, he signed his rookie contract with the team. On August 27, DeRiggi was waived.

=== New England Patriots ===
On November 7, 1990, DeRiggi was signed by the New England Patriots to the practice squad. On December 22, he was elevated to the active roster. DeRiggi played in the final two games of the season but not record any statistics. He became a free agent at the end of the season. DeRiggi was re-signed but was waived again on August 19, 1991.
