= Emanuel McNeil =

American football player (born 1967)

No. 92, 99
- Position: Defensive tackle

Personal information
- Born: June 9, 1967 (age 59); Richmond, Virginia, U.S.
- Listed height: 6 ft 3 in (1.91 m)
- Listed weight: 285 lb (129 kg)

Career information
- High school: Highland Springs (VA)
- College: UT Martin
- NFL draft: 1989: 10th round, 267th overall pick

Career history
- New England Patriots (1989); New York Jets (1990); Dallas Cowboys (1991)*; Winnipeg Blue Bombers (1991)
- * Offseason or practice squad member only
- Stats at Pro Football Reference

Emanuel McNeil (born June 9, 1967) is an American former professional football player who was a defensive tackle in the National Football League (NFL). He played for the New England Patriots in 1989 and the New York Jets in 1990. He played in the Canadian Football League (CFL) for the Winnipeg Blue Bombers in 1991. He was selected in the 10th round of the 1989 NFL draft by the Patriots. He played college football for the UT Martin Skyhawks.
