= Ralston, Iowa =

- City
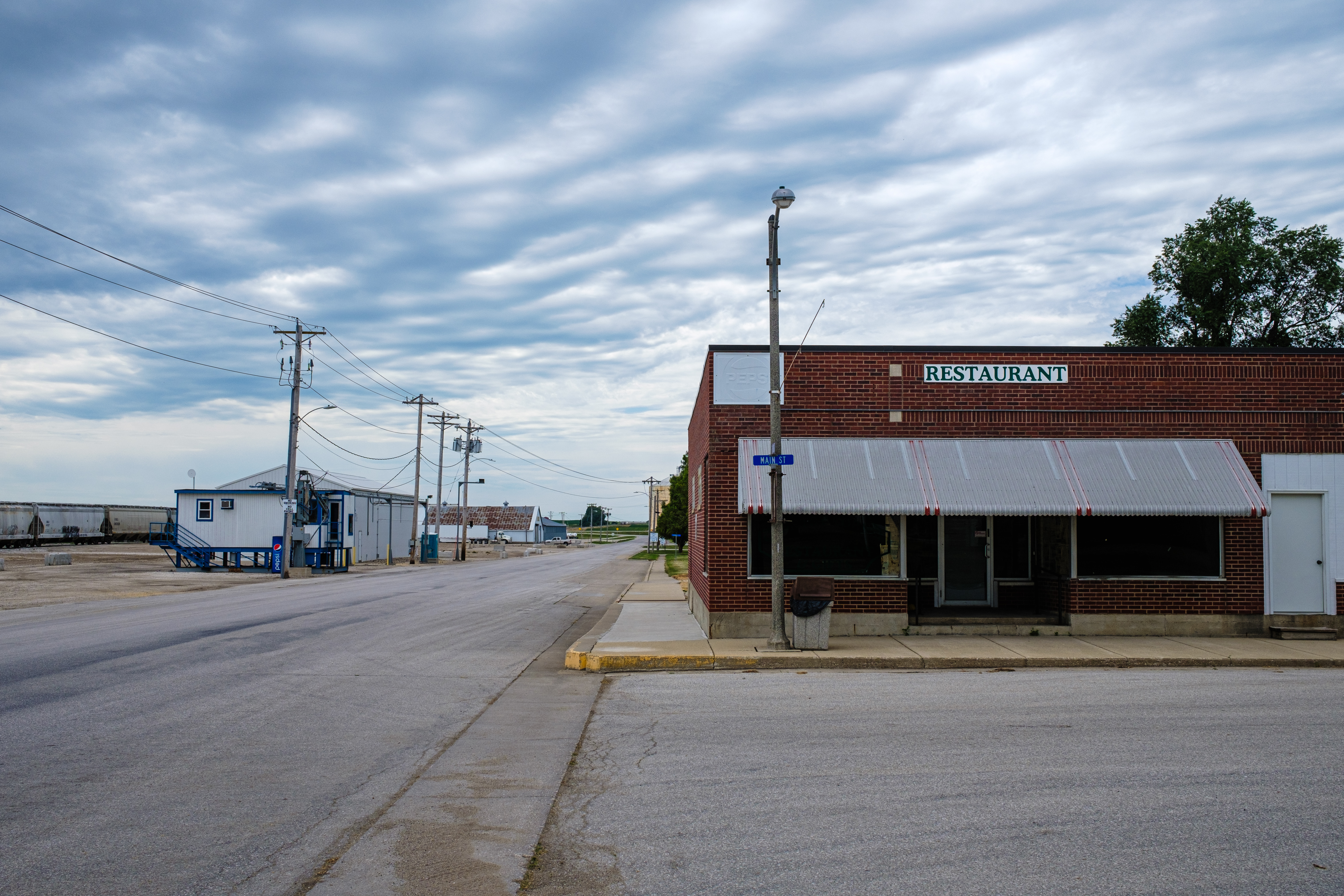
- Facing Northwest on 1st Street in Ralston

- Location of Ralston, Iowa
- Coordinates: 42°02′31″N 94°37′45″W
- Country: US
- State: Iowa
- Counties: Carroll, Greene

Area
  - Total: 1.97 sq mi (5.11 km^{2})
  - Land: 1.97 sq mi (5.11 km^{2})
  - Water: 0 sq mi (0.00 km^{2})
- Elevation: 1,112 ft (339 m)

Population (2020)
  - Total: 81
  - Density: 41.1/sq mi (15.87/km^{2})
- Time zone: UTC-6 (Central (CST))
  - Summer (DST): UTC-5 (CDT)
- ZIP code: 51459
- Area code: 712
- FIPS code: 19-65505
- GNIS feature ID: 2396308

Ralston is a city in Carroll and Greene counties in the U.S. state of Iowa. The population was 81 at the time of the 2020 census.

== History ==
Ralston was incorporated in 1900. It was named for William Chapman Ralston, a California banker.

== Geography ==
According to the United States Census Bureau, the city has a total area of 1.99 square miles (5.15 km^{2}), all land.

== Demographics ==
Historical populations
Year	Pop.	±%
1910	175	—
1920	200	+14.3%
1930	184	−8.0%
1940	202	+9.8%
1950	166	−17.8%
1960	143	−13.9%
1970	129	−9.8%
1980	108	−16.3%
1990	119	+10.2%
2000	98	−17.6%
2010	79	−19.4%
2020	81	+2.5%
Source:"U.S. Census website". United States Census Bureau. and Iowa Data Center; Source: U.S. Decennial Census

=== 2020 census ===
As of the census of 2020, there were 81 people, 39 households, and 23 families residing in the city. The population density was 41.1 inhabitants per square mile (15.9/km^{2}). There were 39 housing units at an average density of 19.8 per square mile (7.6/km^{2}). The racial makeup of the city was 93.8% White, 0.0% Black or African American, 0.0% Native American, 1.2% Asian, 0.0% Pacific Islander, 1.2% from other races and 3.7% from two or more races. Hispanic or Latino persons of any race comprised 1.2% of the population.

Of the 39 households, 35.9% of which had children under the age of 18 living with them, 28.2% were married couples living together, 17.9% were cohabitating couples, 30.8% had a female householder with no spouse or partner present and 23.1% had a male householder with no spouse or partner present. 41.0% of all households were non-families. 25.6% of all households were made up of individuals, 10.3% had someone living alone who was 65 years old or older.

The median age in the city was 42.3 years. 27.2% of the residents were under the age of 20; 1.2% were between the ages of 20 and 24; 25.9% were from 25 and 44; 24.7% were from 45 and 64; and 21.0% were 65 years of age or older. The gender makeup of the city was 49.4% male and 50.6% female.

=== 2010 census ===
As of the census of 2010, there were 79 people, 38 households, and 19 families living in the city. The population density was 39.7 inhabitants per square mile (15.3/km^{2}). There were 45 housing units at an average density of 22.6 per square mile (8.7/km^{2}). The racial makeup of the city was 100.0% White.

There were 38 households, of which 26.3% had children under the age of 18 living with them, 36.8% were married couples living together, 2.6% had a female householder with no husband present, 10.5% had a male householder with no wife present, and 50.0% were non-families. 47.4% of all households were made up of individuals, and 23.7% had someone living alone who was 65 years of age or older. The average household size was 2.08 and the average family size was 2.84.

The median age in the city was 40.3 years. 25.3% of residents were under the age of 18; 6.4% were between the ages of 18 and 24; 29.2% were from 25 to 44; 24.1% were from 45 to 64; and 15.2% were 65 years of age or older. The gender makeup of the city was 48.1% male and 51.9% female.

=== 2000 census ===
As of the census of 2000, there were 98 people, 39 households, and 28 families living in the city. The population density was 49.6 inhabitants per square mile (19.2/km^{2}). There were 47 housing units at an average density of 23.8 per square mile (9.2/km^{2}). The racial makeup of the city was 100.00% White.

There were 39 households, out of which 30.8% had children under the age of 18 living with them, 66.7% were married couples living together, 2.6% had a female householder with no husband present, and 28.2% were non-families. 25.6% of all households were made up of individuals, and 12.8% had someone living alone who was 65 years of age or older. The average household size was 2.51 and the average family size was 3.07.

24.5% are under the age of 18, 6.1% from 18 to 24, 27.6% from 25 to 44, 29.6% from 45 to 64, and 12.2% who were 65 years of age or older. The median age was 41 years. For every 100 females, there were 122.7 males. For every 100 females age 18 and over, there were 117.6 males.

The median income for a household in the city was $34,375, and the median income for a family was $44,000. Males had a median income of $27,083 versus $22,083 for females. The per capita income for the city was $15,746. There were no families and 0.9% of the population living below the poverty line, including no under eighteens and 16.7% of those over 64.

== Economy ==
Ralston was the headquarters of the West Central Cooperative which was Iowa's largest farmer's cooperative. (Note: According to Chuck Offenburger: In 1907, local farmers first organized the "Farmers Elevator Company" which went bankrupt in 1929. In 1933, the new co-op was established as "The Farmers Co-operative Association of Ralston." It grew rapidly during the 1950s, the 1960s and the 1970s. Its original CEO Karl Nolin retired and was followed by the CEOs Wayne Seaman and Tom Feldman. Its "grain trains" included gondola cars painted pink which were easier to locate for return to Ralston. In 1978, The Farmers Co-operative Association of Ralston became the West Central Cooperative, with headquarters remaining in Ralston. West Central Cooperative was the largest co-op in Iowa. In 1999, Jeff Stroburg became the CEO of West Central Cooperative, and in 2003, he led creation of a new subsidiary, "Renewable Energy Group" or "REG," which quickly became the nation's largest marketer of bio-diesel fuel. In 2007, REG moved its offices and most of its labs to Ames. Stroburg took over leadership of REG, and, in 2015, the new CEO of West Central became Milan Kucerak. With Kucerak in charge, the West Central Cooperative, which was headquartered in Ralston, became part of the Landus Cooperative in the 2016 merger with the Farmers Cooperative Company, which was headquartered in Farnhamville, Iowa and was a cooperative of a similar size located about 25 miles northeast of Ralston. After the merger, the new company "Landus" briefly maintained executive offices in both Ralston and Farnhamville but soon relocated their headquarters to Ames, Iowa. Matt Carstens became Landus CEO in 2020, and, in 2022, the Landus Cooperative headquarters moved to downtown Des Moines, locating in a new building at Southwest Ninth Street and Martin Luther King Jr. Parkway which is on the south side of the downtown Des Moines business district. In March 2024, Chevron announced that the Renewable Energy Group (REG) biodiesel plant in Ralston, which Chevron acquired after it purchased the Renewable Energy Group (REG) for $3.15 billion in June 2022, would close.)

== Education ==
The Glidden–Ralston Community School District operates area schools.
