= List of Las Vegas Raiders starting quarterbacks =

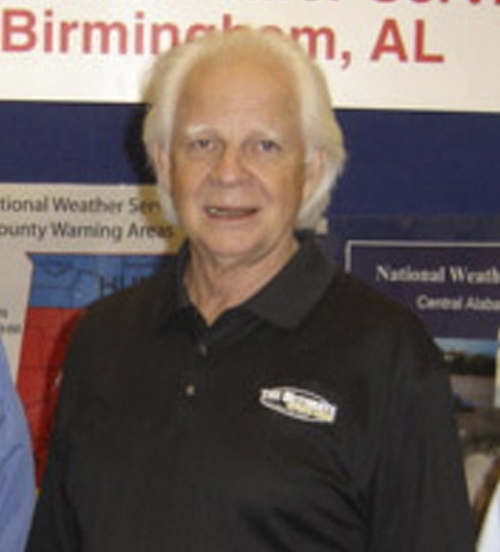
Ken Stabler helped the Raiders win their first Super Bowl

These quarterbacks have started at least one game for the Oakland/Los Angeles/Las Vegas Raiders of the National Football League (NFL).

== Starting quarterbacks ==
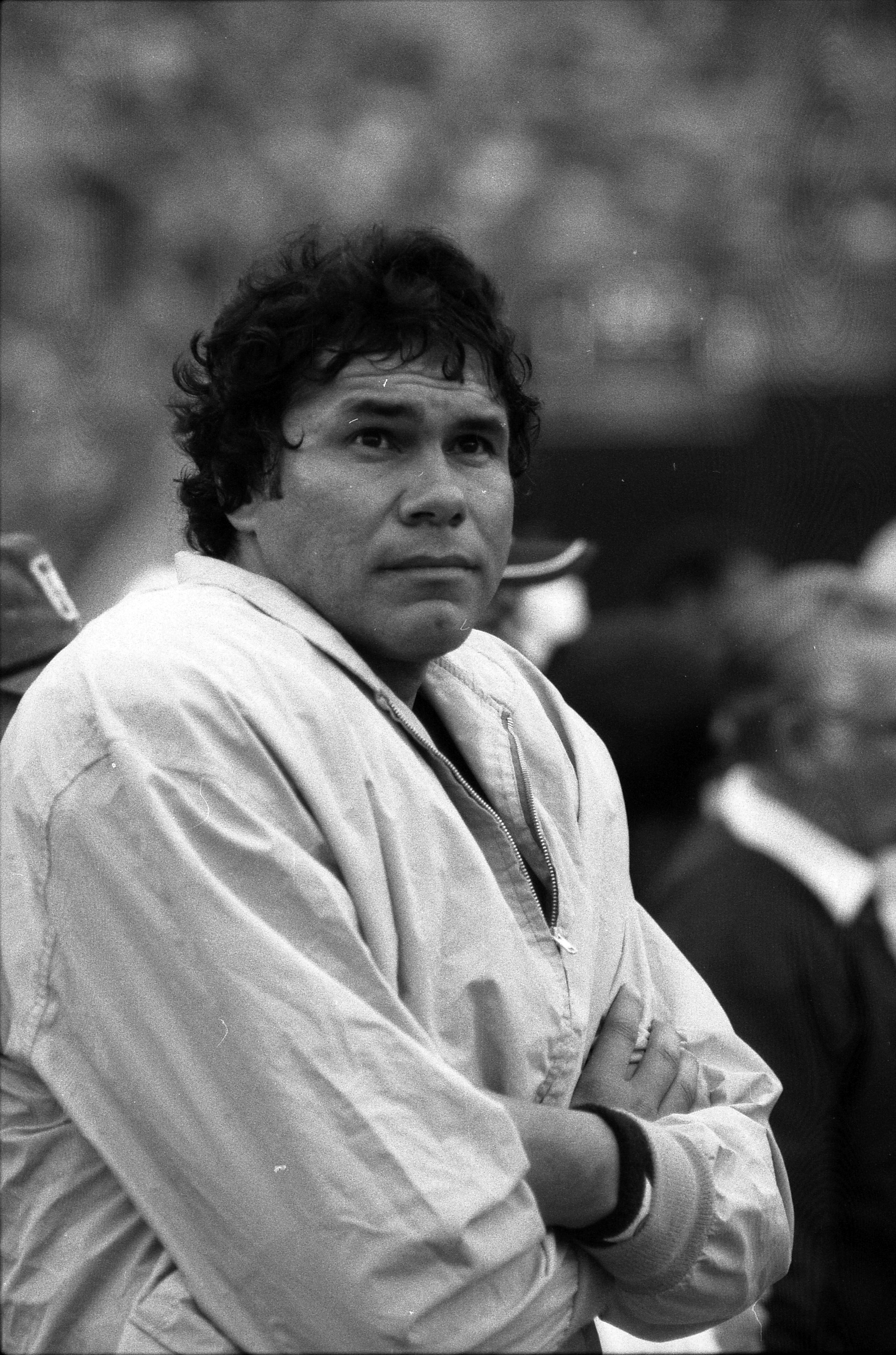
Jim Plunkett led the Raiders to two Super Bowl victories

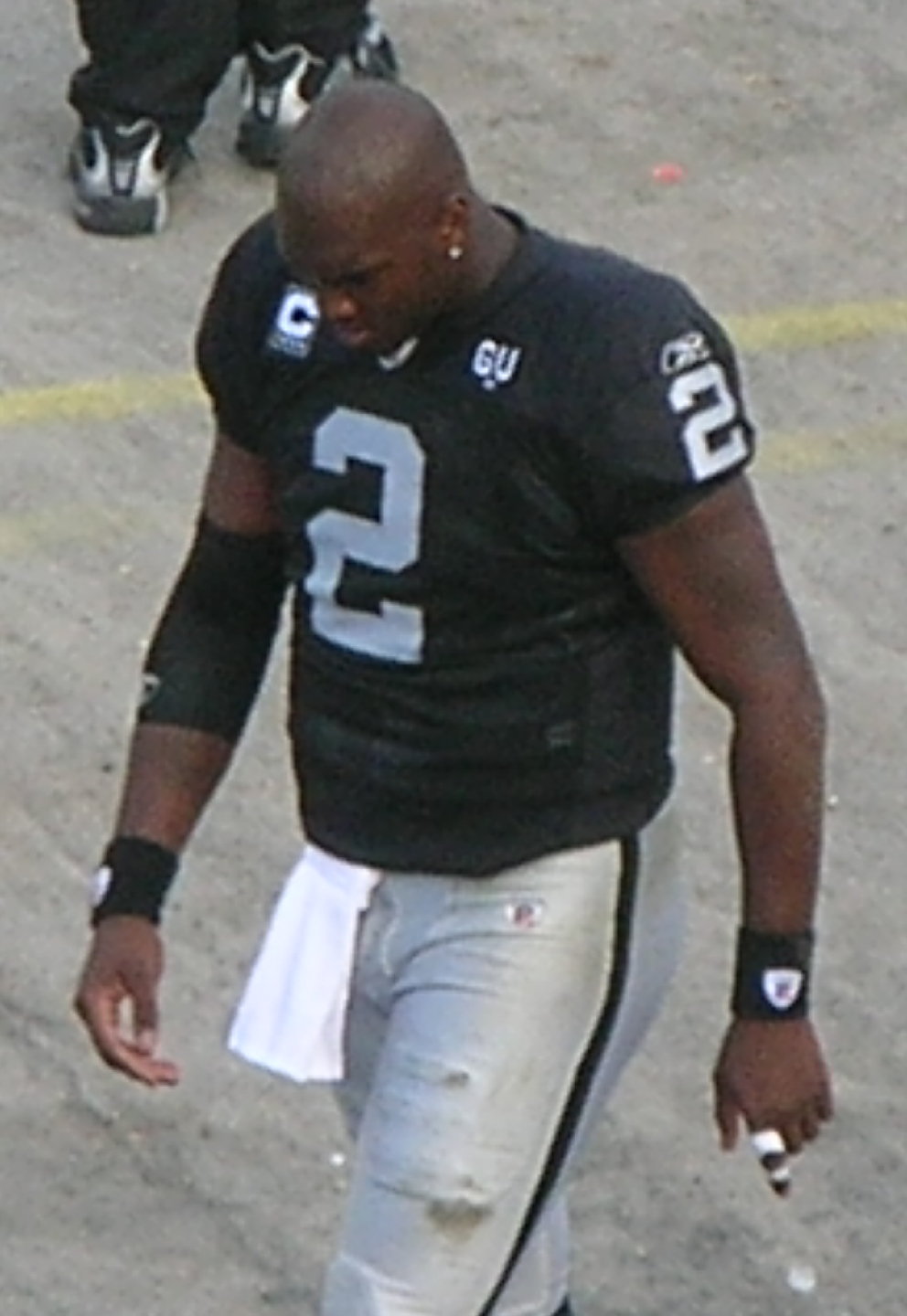
JaMarcus Russell (2007–2009)

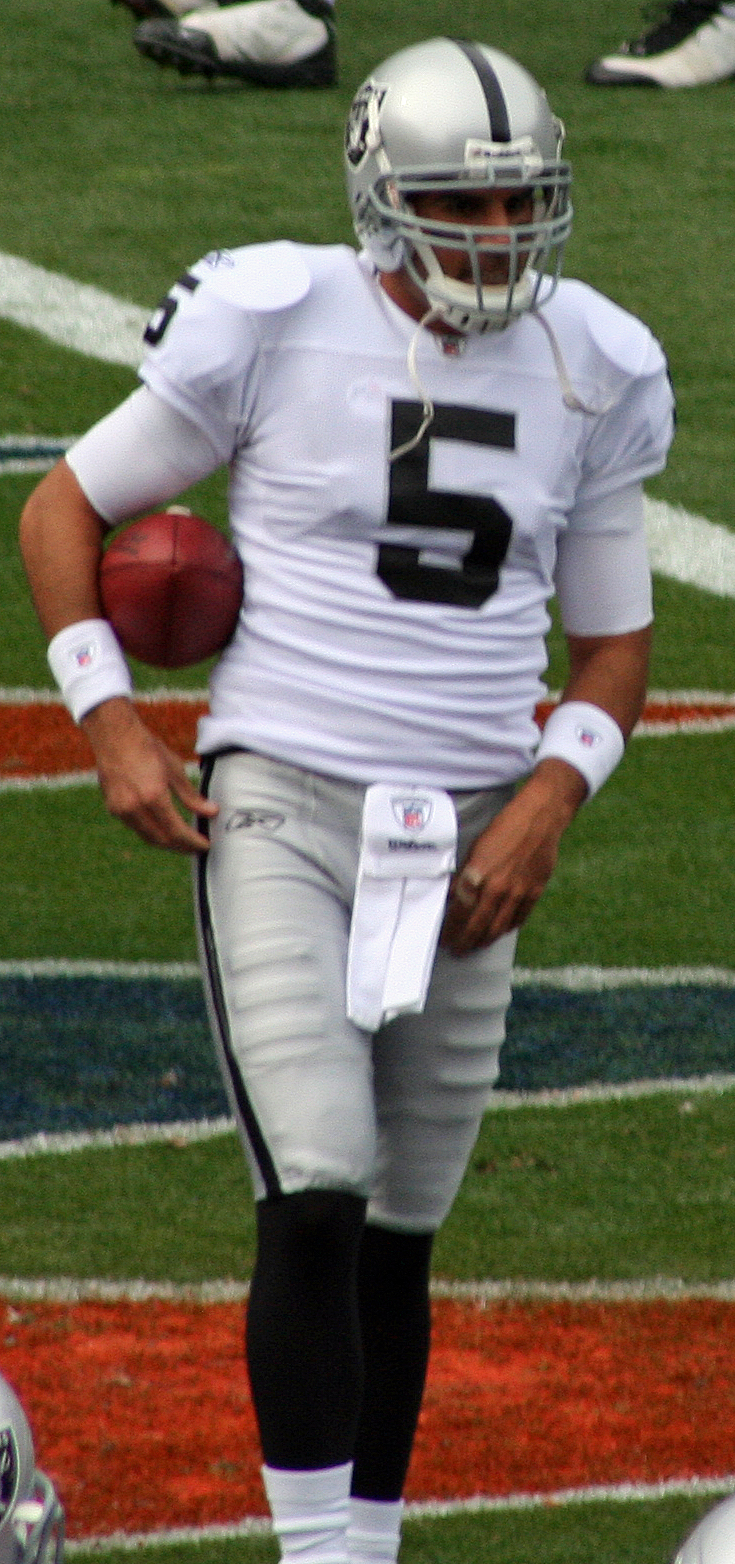
Bruce Gradkowski (2009–2010)

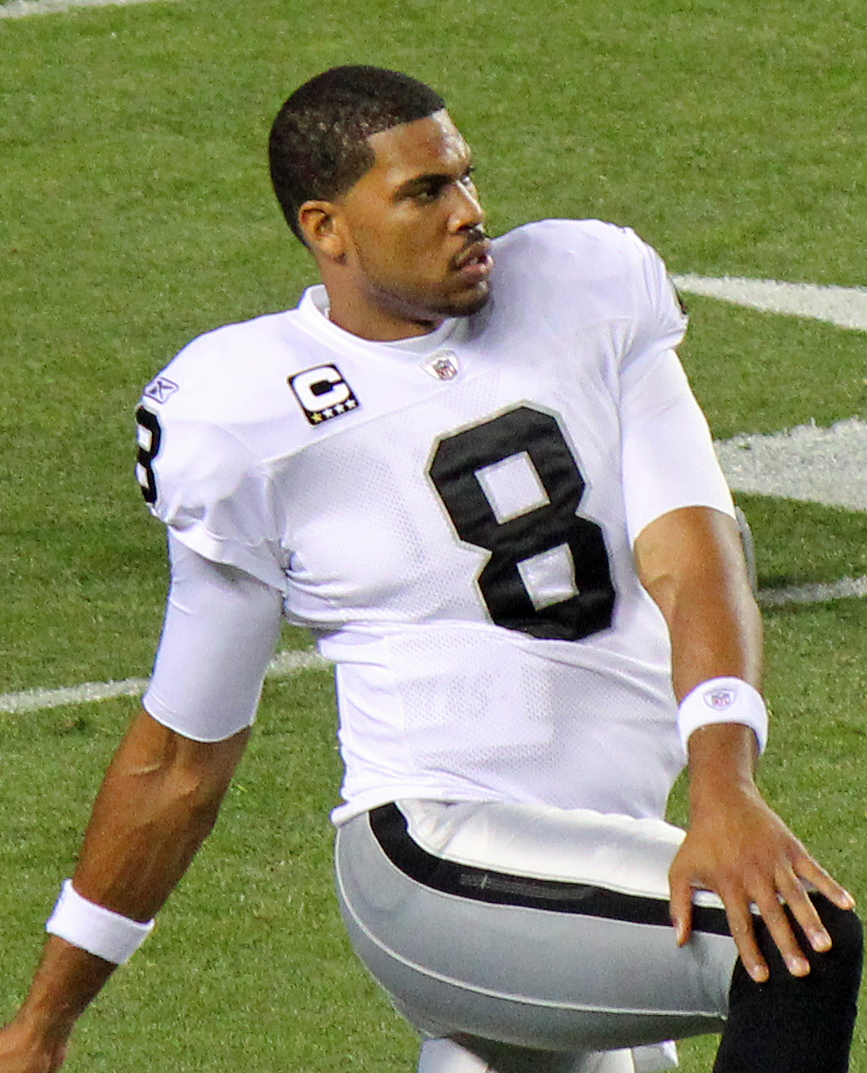
Jason Campbell (2010–2011)

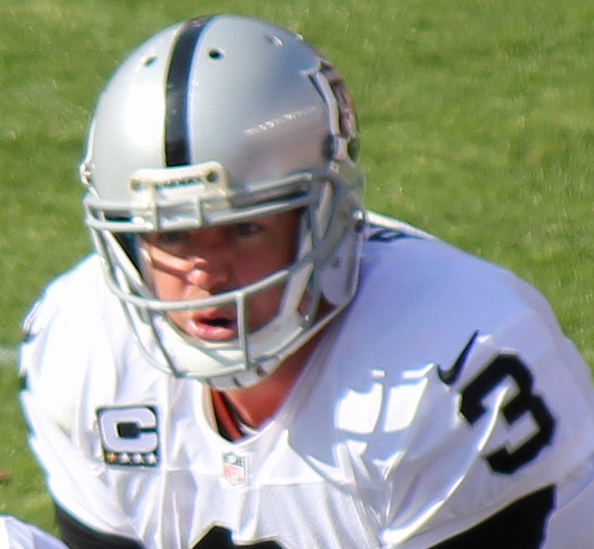
Carson Palmer (2011–2012)

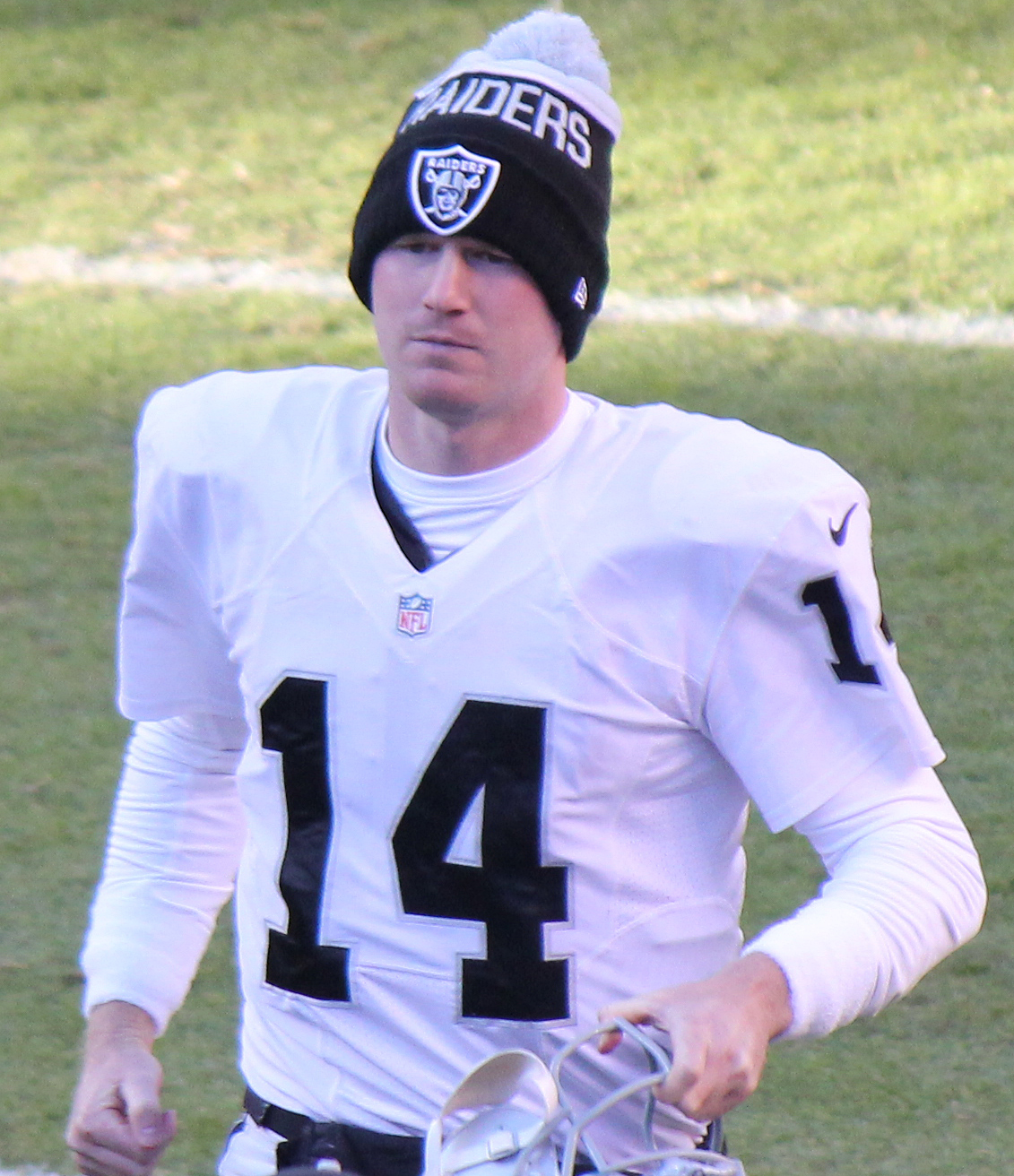
Matt McGloin (2013, 2016)

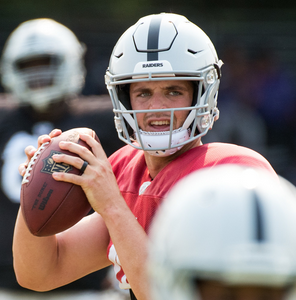
Derek Carr (2014–2022)

The number of games they started during the season is listed to the right:

=== Regular season ===
Season(s)	Quarterback(s)
Oakland Raiders 1960–1981
1960	Tom Flores (12) / Babe Parilli (2)
1961	Tom Flores (14)
1962	Cotton Davidson (12) / Hunter Enis (1) / Don Heinrich (1)
1963	Tom Flores (9) / Cotton Davidson (5)
1964	Tom Flores (7) / Cotton Davidson (7)
1965	Tom Flores (11) / Dick Wood (3)
1966	Tom Flores (10) / Cotton Davidson (4)
1967	Daryle Lamonica (14)
1968	Daryle Lamonica (13) / George Blanda (1)
1969	Daryle Lamonica (14)
1970	Daryle Lamonica (14)
1971	Daryle Lamonica (13) / Ken Stabler (1)
1972	Daryle Lamonica (13) / Ken Stabler (1)
1973	Ken Stabler (11) / Daryle Lamonica (3)
1974	Ken Stabler (13) / Larry Lawrence (1)
1975	Ken Stabler (13) / Larry Lawrence (1)
1976	Ken Stabler (12) / Mike Rae (2)
1977	Ken Stabler (13) / Mike Rae (1)
1978	Ken Stabler (16)
1979	Ken Stabler (16)
1980	Jim Plunkett (11) / Dan Pastorini (5)
1981	Marc Wilson (9) / Jim Plunkett (7)
Los Angeles Raiders 1982–1994
1982	Jim Plunkett (9)
1983	Jim Plunkett (13) / Marc Wilson (3)
1984	Marc Wilson (10) / Jim Plunkett (6)
1985	Marc Wilson (13) / Jim Plunkett (3)
1986	Marc Wilson (8) / Jim Plunkett (8)
1987	Marc Wilson (7) / Rusty Hilger (5) / Vince Evans (3)
1988	Jay Schroeder (8) / Steve Beuerlein (8)
1989	Jay Schroeder (9) / Steve Beuerlein (7)
1990	Jay Schroeder (16)
1991	Jay Schroeder (15) / Todd Marinovich (1)
1992	Jay Schroeder (9) / Todd Marinovich (7)
1993	Jeff Hostetler (15) / Vince Evans (1)
1994	Jeff Hostetler (16)
Oakland Raiders 1995–2019
1995	Jeff Hostetler (11) / Vince Evans (3) / Billy Joe Hobert (2)
1996	Jeff Hostetler (13) / Billy Joe Hobert (3)
1997	Jeff George (16)
1998	Jeff George (7) / Donald Hollas (6) / Wade Wilson (3)
1999	Rich Gannon (16)
2000	Rich Gannon (16)
2001	Rich Gannon (16)
2002	Rich Gannon (16)
2003	Rick Mirer (8) / Rich Gannon (7) / Marques Tuiasosopo (1)
2004	Kerry Collins (13) / Rich Gannon (3)
2005	Kerry Collins (15) / Marques Tuiasosopo (1)
2006	Andrew Walter (8) / Aaron Brooks (8)
2007	Josh McCown (9) / Daunte Culpepper (6) / JaMarcus Russell (1)
2008	JaMarcus Russell (15) / Andrew Walter (1)
2009	JaMarcus Russell (9) / Bruce Gradkowski (4) / Charlie Frye (3)
2010	Jason Campbell (12) / Bruce Gradkowski (4)
2011	Carson Palmer (9) / Jason Campbell (6) / Kyle Boller (1)
2012	Carson Palmer (15) / Terrelle Pryor (1)
2013	Terrelle Pryor (9) / Matt McGloin (6) / Matt Flynn (1)
2014	Derek Carr (16)
2015	Derek Carr (16)
2016	Derek Carr (15) / Matt McGloin (1)
2017	Derek Carr (15) / EJ Manuel (1)
2018	Derek Carr (16)
2019	Derek Carr (16)
Las Vegas Raiders 2020–present
2020	Derek Carr (16)
2021	Derek Carr (17)
2022	Derek Carr (15) / Jarrett Stidham (2)
2023	Aidan O'Connell (10) / Jimmy Garoppolo (6) / Brian Hoyer (1)
2024	Gardner Minshew (9) / Aidan O'Connell (7) / Desmond Ridder (1)
2025	Geno Smith (15) / Kenny Pickett (2)
2026	Kirk Cousins (9) / Fernando Mendoza (2)

=== Postseason ===
Season	Quarterback(s)
1967	Daryle Lamonica (1–1)
1968	Daryle Lamonica (1–1)
1969	Daryle Lamonica (1–1)
1970	Daryle Lamonica (1–1)
1972	Daryle Lamonica (0–1)
1973	Ken Stabler (1–1)
1974	Ken Stabler (1–1)
1975	Ken Stabler (1–1)
1976	Ken Stabler (3–0)
1977	Ken Stabler (1–1)
1980	Jim Plunkett (4–0)
1982	Jim Plunkett (1–1)
1983	Jim Plunkett (3–0)
1984	Jim Plunkett (0–1)
1985	Marc Wilson (0–1)
1990	Jay Schroeder (1–1)
1991	Todd Marinovich (0–1)
1993	Jeff Hostetler (1–1)
2000	Rich Gannon (1–1)
2001	Rich Gannon (1–1)
2002	Rich Gannon (2–1)
2016	Connor Cook (0–1)
2021	Derek Carr (0–1)

== Most games started ==
These quarterbacks have the most starts for the Raiders in regular season games (through the 2022 NFL season).

Name	
GP	Games played
GS	Games started
W	Number of wins as starting quarterback
L	Number of losses as starting quarterback
T	Number of ties as starting quarterback
Pct	Winning percentage as starting quarterback

Name	Period	GP	GS	W	L	T	%
Derek Carr	2014–2022	142	142	63	79	—	.444
Ken Stabler	1970–1979	130	96	69	26	1	.724
Daryle Lamonica	1967–1974	95	84	62	16	6	.774
Rich Gannon	1999–2004	74	74	45	29	—	.608
Tom Flores	1960–1966	84	63	30	30	3	.500
Jim Plunkett	1979–1986	70	57	38	19	—	.667
Jay Schroeder	1988–1992	64	57	32	25	—	.561
Jeff Hostetler	1993–1996	55	55	33	22	—	.600
Marc Wilson	1980–1987	96	50	31	19	—	.620

== Team career passing records ==
(Through the 2025 NFL season)

Name	Comp	Att	%	Yds	TD	Int
Derek Carr	3,201	4,958	64.6	35,222	217	99
Rich Gannon	1,533	2,448	62.6	17,585	114	50
Ken Stabler	1,486	2,481	59.9	19,078	150	143
Daryle Lamonica	1,138	2,248	50.6	16,655	148	115
Jim Plunkett	960	1,707	56.2	12,665	80	81
Jeff Hostetler	913	1,562	58.5	11,122	69	49
Marc Wilson	871	1,666	52.3	11,760	77	86
Tom Flores	810	1,640	49.4	11,635	92	83
Jay Schroeder	698	1,394	50.1	10,276	66	62

== See also ==
- List of American Football League players
- Lists of NFL starting quarterbacks
