= Rodney Rice (American football) =

American football player (born 1966)

No. 43, 31
- Position: Defensive back

Personal information
- Born: June 18, 1966 (age 60); Albany, Georgia, U.S.
- Listed height: 5 ft 8 in (1.73 m)
- Listed weight: 180 lb (82 kg)

Career information
- High school: Atwater (Atwater, California)
- College: BYU
- NFL draft: 1989: 8th round, 210th overall pick

Career history
- New England Patriots (1989); Tampa Bay Buccaneers (1990); Detroit Lions (1992)*
- * Offseason or practice squad member only

Awards and highlights
- First-team All-WAC (1988)

Career NFL statistics
- Interceptions: 2
- Fumble recoveries: 1
- Stats at Pro Football Reference

Rodney Rice (born June 18, 1966) is an American former professional football player who was a defensive back in the National Football League (NFL). He played for the New England Patriots in 1989 and for the Tampa Bay Buccaneers in 1990. He played college football for the BYU Cougars and was selected by the Patriots in the eighth round of the 1989 NFL draft with the 210th overall pick.
