= Larry McGrew =

American football player (1957–2004)

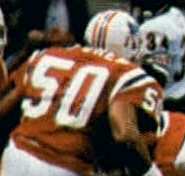
- McGrew playing for the Patriots in Super Bowl XX

No. 50, 57
- Position: Linebacker

Personal information
- Born: July 23, 1957; Berkeley, California, U.S.
- Died: April 5, 2004 (aged 46); Lancaster, California, U.S.
- Listed height: 6 ft 5 in (1.96 m)
- Listed weight: 233 lb (106 kg)

Career information
- High school: Berkeley
- College: Southern California
- NFL draft: 1980: 2nd round, 45th overall pick

Career history
- New England Patriots (1980–1989); New York Giants (1990)

Awards and highlights
- Super Bowl champion (XXV)

Career NFL statistics
- Games: 133
- Sacks: 13.5
- Fumble recoveries: 5
- Interceptions: 6
- Stats at Pro Football Reference

Lawrence McGrew (July 23, 1957 – April 2, 2004) was an American professional football player who was a linebacker in the National Football League (NFL).

== College career ==
McGrew played football at Contra Costa College and the University of Southern California, and started in two Rose Bowls. During the second round of the 1980 NFL draft, he was selected by the New England Patriots as an outside linebacker.

== Professional career ==
McGrew played for the NFL's New England Patriots and New York Giants between 1980 and 1990. He helped New England reach the Super Bowl in 1986 and earned a championship ring when New York beat Buffalo in Super Bowl XXV.

=== Super Bowl XX ===
McGrew will be remembered for a play he didn't make that occurred during Super Bowl XX between the New England Patriots and Chicago Bears in 1986. McGrew was on the receiving end of the hit that propelled William "the Refrigerator" Perry' into the end zone. McGrew didn't get up immediately after the play a teammate came over and asked him if he was okay. McGrew replied "Yeah, I'm fine. But I just made ESPN highlights for eternity."

== Death ==
McGrew died on April 2, 2004, at the age of 46.

McGrew collapsed at his home in Lancaster, California, due to a massive heart attack. McGrew left his two children and one step-child by his wife Charyce McGrew – Celsea, Camynn and Charyce Searcy – and three children Larry, Aaron, Analeise, granddaughter Lawryn, a grandson Nehamiah by a previous marriage to Elaine McGrew; who currently resides in El Sobrante, California.

== Identity theft ==
A Colorado thief named Frederick William McGrew III used Larry McGrew's name and career statistics to get a job as an assistant football coach at Gavilan College in California. The impostor was discovered five weeks later, fired and arrested; he told police he was Lawrence's nephew and repeated the claim at his initial court appearance, but it was discovered to be a lie.

In December 1999, Frederick McGrew was sentenced to three years of supervised probation and 160 hours of community service for stealing Lawrence's identity and for fraudulently using an Ohio woman's Social Security number.

Frederick McGrew also falsely worked under the NFL star's name while working as a cook in a TGI Friday's restaurant in Salt Lake City, UT during the late 1990s, and even told at least one restaurant employee "I was the player who William "The Refrigerator" Perry ran over in the end zone to score a touchdown in Super Bowl XX."

It is unknown if TGI Friday's management was ever made aware of this fraud, or if their tax/payroll records were ever corrected.
