= Glidden–Ralston Community School District =

Public school district in Glidden, Iowa, United States

Location
- Glidden, Iowa Carroll and Greene counties United States
- Coordinates: 42.06108°N 94.72808°W

District information
- Type: Local school district
- Grades: K–12
- Superintendent: Kreg Lensch
- Schools: 2
- Budget: $4,804,000 (2020-21)
- NCES District ID: 1912750

Students and staff
- Students: 386 (2022-23)
- Teachers: 30.21 FTE
- Staff: 33.43 FTE
- Student–teacher ratio: 12.78
- Athletic conference: Rolling Valley
- District mascot: Wildcats
- Colors: Blue and Gold

Other information
- Website: www.glidden-ralston.k12.ia.us

The Glidden–Ralston Community School District is a rural public school district based in Glidden, Iowa. The district is mostly in Carroll County, with a smaller area in Greene County. The district serves the towns of Glidden and Ralston, and the surrounding rural areas. The district has shared a superintendent with Paton-Churdan Community School District since 2015. The school's mascot is the Wildcats. Their colors are blue and gold.

== Schools ==
The district operates two schools, both in Glidden:

- Glidden–Ralston Elementary School
- Glidden–Ralston Jr-Sr High School

== Glidden–Ralston High School ==
=== Athletics ===
The Wildcats compete in the Rolling Valley Conference in the following sports:

- Baseball
- Basketball
- Cross country
- Football
  - Two-time state champions - (1975 - Class 1A, 2005 - 8-man)
- Golf
- Soccer
- Swimming
- Softball
- Track and field
  - Boys' 1962 Class B state champions
- Trap shooting
- Volleyball
- Wrestling

== See also ==
- List of school districts in Iowa
- List of high schools in Iowa
