= Eric Coleman (defensive back) =

American football player (born 1966)

No. 22
- Position: Defensive back

Personal information
- Born: December 27, 1966 (age 59); Denver, Colorado, U.S.
- Listed height: 6 ft 0 in (1.83 m)
- Listed weight: 190 lb (86 kg)

Career information
- High school: Thomas Jefferson (Denver, Colorado)
- College: Wyoming
- NFL draft: 1989: 2nd round, 43rd overall pick

Career history
- New England Patriots (1989–1990); Kansas City Chiefs (1992)*; Buffalo Bills (1992)*; Denver Broncos (1993)*
- * Offseason or practice squad member only

Awards and highlights
- First-team All-WAC (1988)

Career NFL statistics
- Interceptions: 1
- Stats at Pro Football Reference

Eric Gerard Coleman (born December 27, 1966) is an American former professional football player who was a defensive back in the National Football League (NFL) for the New England Patriots. He was selected by the Patriots in the second round of the 1989 NFL draft with the 43rd overall pick. Coleman played college football for the Wyoming Cowboys.
