= List of Sacramento State Hornets in the NFL draft =

This is a list of Sacramento State Hornets football players in the NFL draft.

== Key ==
B	Back	K	Kicker	NT	Nose tackle
C	Center	LB	Linebacker	FB	Fullback
DB	Defensive back	P	Punter	HB	Halfback
DE	Defensive end	QB	Quarterback	WR	Wide receiver
DT	Defensive tackle	RB	Running back	G	Guard
E	End	T	Offensive tackle	TE	Tight end

= Pro Bowler
= Hall of Famer

== Selections ==
Year	Round	Pick	Player	Team	Position
1967	15	371	Al Nicholas	Atlanta Falcons	RB
1970	15	380	Mike Carter	Green Bay Packers	WR
1984	4	92	John Farley	Cincinnati Bengals	RB
1986	5	137	Greg Robinson	New England Patriots	G
1986	9	237	Mike Black	Seattle Seahawks	T
1987	10	254	Rob Harrison	Los Angeles Raiders	DB
1987	10	265	John Gesek	Los Angeles Raiders	G
1997	6	184	Daimon Shelton	Jacksonville Jaguars	FB
1997	7	237	Tony Corbin	San Diego Chargers	QB
2004	6	178	Marko Cavka	New York Jets	T
2023	3	76	Marte Mapu	New England Patriots	LB
2025	5	167	Jackson Slater	Tennessee Titans	G
