= 2023 New England Patriots season =

64th season in franchise history; final one with Bill Belichick

- Owner: Robert Kraft
- Head coach: Bill Belichick
- Home stadium: Gillette Stadium

Results
- Record: 4–13
- Division place: 4th AFC East
- Playoffs: Did not qualify

Uniform
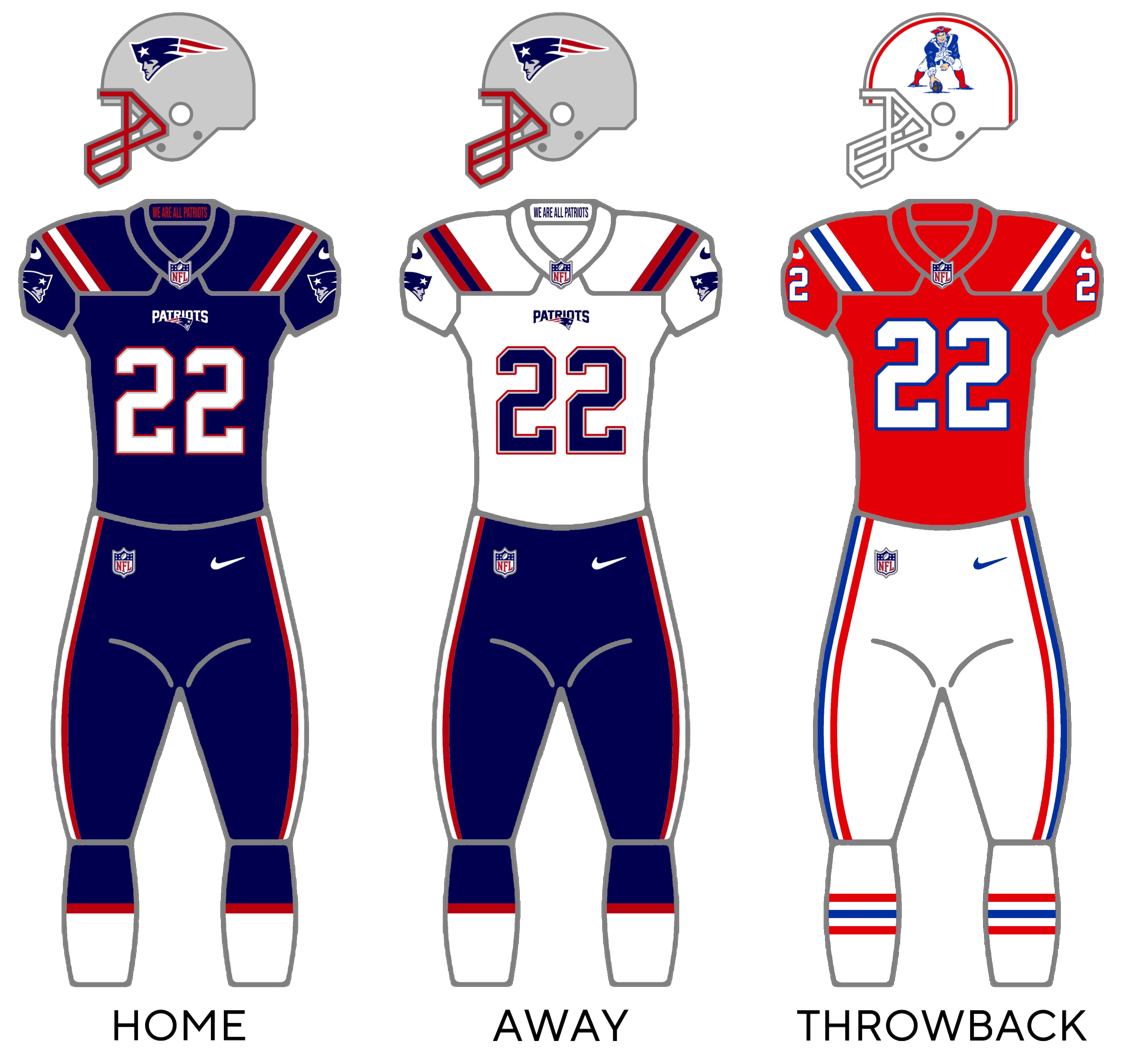

The 2023 season was the New England Patriots' 54th in the National Football League (NFL), their 64th overall, their 22nd playing home games at Gillette Stadium and their 24th and final under head coach Bill Belichick.

The Patriots started 1–5 for the first time since 1995. Following their Week 12 loss to the New York Giants, the Patriots failed to improve on their 8–9 record from 2022. This was the first time the Patriots had back-to-back losing seasons since 1992–1993. The Patriots missed the postseason for the second consecutive year (and third in four seasons). Following a Week 17 loss to the Buffalo Bills, the Patriots finished last in the AFC East for the first time since 2000. The 4–13 record marked Belichick's worst-ever season as an NFL head coach, and the Patriots' worst season since 1992.

The team's offense finished last in scoring (tied with the Panthers). They were also shutout twice, failed to score 10 or more points in six games, failed to score 20 or more points in 12 games, and failed to score 30 or more points for the first time since 1991. The Patriots also failed to win consecutive games for the first time since 1990. Belichick and the Patriots mutually agreed to part ways following the season's conclusion.

== Roster changes ==
=== Free agency ===
==== Unrestricted ====
Position	Player	2023 team	Date signed	Contract
WR	Nelson Agholor	Baltimore Ravens	March 29, 2023	1 year, $3.25 million
OT	Marcus Cannon			
LS	Joe Cardona	New England Patriots	March 21, 2023	4 years, $6.3 million
DT	Carl Davis	New England Patriots	March 13, 2023	1 year, $1.3175 million
FS	Cody Davis	New England Patriots	March 21, 2023	1 year, $2.2 million
DT	Daniel Ekuale	New England Patriots	March 23, 2023	2 years, $3.4 million
RB	Damien Harris	Buffalo Bills	March 21, 2023	1 year, $1.77 million
CB	Jonathan Jones	New England Patriots	March 13, 2023	2 years, $19 million
WR	Jakobi Meyers	Las Vegas Raiders	March 16, 2023	3 years, $33 million
P	Michael Palardy			
SS	Jabrill Peppers	New England Patriots	March 17, 2023	2 years, $9 million
CB	Joejuan Williams	Minnesota Vikings	April 17, 2023	1 year, $1.1 million
OLB	Mack Wilson	New England Patriots	March 20, 2023	1 year, $1.6 million
OT	Isaiah Wynn	Miami Dolphins	May 14, 2023	1 year, $2.3 million

==== Restricted ====
Position	Player	2023 team	Date signed	Contract
CB	Myles Bryant	New England Patriots	April 17, 2023	1 year, $2.627 million
OT	Yodny Cajuste	New England Patriots	April 5, 2023	1 year, $2.743 million

==== Signings/waiver claims ====
Player	Position	Previous team	Date signed	Contract
Calvin Anderson	OT	Denver Broncos	March 16, 2023	2 years, $7 million
James Robinson	RB	New York Jets	March 17, 2023	2 years, $4 million
Juju Smith-Schuster	WR	Kansas City Chiefs	March 17, 2023	3 years, $25.5 million
Mike Gesicki	TE	Miami Dolphins	March 20, 2023	1 year, $4.5 million
Riley Reiff	OT	Chicago Bears	March 20, 2023	1 year, $5 million
Chris Board	LB	Detroit Lions	March 22, 2023	2 years, $5 million
Corliss Waitman	P	Denver Broncos	March 23, 2023	1 year, $990,000
Trace McSorley	QB	Arizona Cardinals	April 13, 2023	1 year, $1.08 million
Anthony Firkser	TE	Atlanta Falcons	May 25, 2023	1 year, $1.08 million
Ezekiel Elliott	RB	Dallas Cowboys	August 16, 2023	1 year, $3 million
Marquan McCall	DT	Carolina Panthers	August 22, 2023	3 years, $2.575 million
Matt Corral	QB	Carolina Panthers	August 31, 2023	4 years, $5.094 million
Bailey Zappe	QB	New England Patriots	September 9, 2023	1 year, $870,000
Ty Montgomery II	RB	New England Patriots	September 9, 2023	1 year, $1.165 million
Will Grier	QB	Cincinnati Bengals	September 21, 2023	1 year, $370,800
Malik Cunningham	QB	New England Patriots	October 14, 2023	3 years, $2.725 million
Jalen Reagor	WR	New England Patriots	October 26, 2023	1 year, $1.01 million
Alex Austin	CB	Houston Texans	November 2, 2023	1 year, $750,000
Jeremiah Pharms Jr.	DT	New England Patriots	November 4, 2023	1 year, $750,000
JaMycal Hasty	RB	Jacksonville Jaguars	November 13, 2023	2 years, $2.9 million
Conor McDermott	OT	New England Patriots	November 25, 2023	1 year, $1.08 million
Christian Elliss	LB	Philadelphia Eagles	December 8, 2023	2 years, $1.575 million
Nathan Rourke	QB	Jacksonville Jaguars	December 18, 2023	1 year, $750,000
Kevin Harris	RB	New England Patriots	December 19, 2023	1 year, $705,000
James Ferentz	C	New England Patriots	December 23, 2023	1 year, $1.08 million
Marco Wilson	CB	Arizona Cardinals	December 27, 2023	4 years, $4.13 million
La'Michael Pettway	TE	New England Patriots	January 6, 2024	

=== Releases/waivers ===
Position	Player	Date released/waived
QB	Brian Hoyer	March 16, 2023
WR	Lynn Bowden Jr.	May 10, 2023
OT	Yodny Cajuste	May 18, 2023
WR	Tre Nixon	August 22, 2023
DT	Marquan McCall	August 23, 2023
DT	Carl Davis Jr.	August 26, 2023
CB	Quandre Mosely	August 26, 2023
LB	Diego Fagot	August 27, 2023
S	Brad Hawkins Jr.	August 27, 2023
TE	Johnny Lumpkin	August 27, 2023
RB	C. J. Marable	August 27, 2023
DB	Rodney Randle Jr.	August 27, 2023
DT	Justus Tavai	August 27, 2023
OT	Micah Vanterpool	August 27, 2023
TE	Scotty Washington	August 27, 2023
LB	Carson Wells	August 27, 2023
QB	Trace McSorley	August 28, 2023
P	Corliss Waitman	August 28, 2023
S	Joshuah Bledsoe	August 29, 2023
QB	Malik Cunningham	August 29, 2023
C	James Ferentz	August 29, 2023
TE	Anthony Firkser	August 29, 2023
LB	Joe Giles-Harris	August 29, 2023
RB	Kevin Harris	August 29, 2023
G	Chasen Hines	August 29, 2023
RB	Ty Montgomery II	August 29, 2023
LB	Calvin Munson	August 29, 2023
G	Bill Murray	August 29, 2023
LB	Ronnie Perkins	August 29, 2023
DT	Jeremiah Pharms Jr.	August 29, 2023
WR	Thyrick Pitts	August 29, 2023
C	Kody Russey	August 29, 2023
TE	Matt Sokol	August 29, 2023
G	Andrew Stueber	August 29, 2023
RB	J. J. Taylor	August 29, 2023
WR	Raleigh Webb	August 29, 2023
QB	Bailey Zappe	August 29, 2023
QB	Ian Book	September 18, 2023
QB	Matt Corral	September 18, 2023
P	Corliss Waitman	October 4, 2023
CB	Ameer Speed	October 19, 2023
QB	Malik Cunningham	October 24, 2023
DE	Trey Flowers	October 24, 2023
CB	Jack Jones	November 13, 2023
QB	Will Grier	November 25, 2023
RB	Ty Montgomery II	December 8, 2023

=== Trades ===
- March 16 – Tight end Jonnu Smith was traded to the Atlanta Falcons in exchange for a 2023 seventh-round selection (No. 245).
- August 27 – Running back Pierre Strong Jr. was traded to the Cleveland Browns in exchange for offensive tackle Tyrone Wheatley Jr.
- August 27 – The Patriots traded a 2024 sixth-round selection to the Minnesota Vikings in exchange for offensive tackle Vederian Lowe.
- August 29 – Kicker Nick Folk was traded to the Tennessee Titans in exchange for a 2025 seventh-round selection.
- October 5 – The Patriots traded a 2025 sixth-round selection to the Los Angeles Chargers in exchange for cornerback J. C. Jackson and a 2025 seventh-round selection.

== Draft ==
2023 New England Patriots draft selections
Round	Selection	Player	Position	College	Notes
1	17	Christian Gonzalez	CB	Oregon	From Pittsburgh (Note: The Patriots traded a first-round selection (14th overall) to Pittsburgh in exchange for first- and fourth-round selections (17th and 120th overall).)
2	46	Keion White	DE	Georgia Tech	
3	76	Marte Mapu	MLB	Sacramento State	From Carolina (Note: The Patriots traded a 2022 third-round selection to the Carolina Panthers in exchange for a third-round selection (76th overall) and a 2022 fourth-round selection.)
4	107	Jake Andrews	C	Troy	From Rams (Note: The Patriots traded RB Sony Michel to the Los Angeles Rams in exchange for a fourth-round selection (107th overall) and a 2022 sixth-round selection.)
4	112	Chad Ryland	K	Maryland	From Jets (Note: The Patriots traded fourth- and sixth-round selections (120th and 184th overall) to the New York Jets in exchange for a fourth-round selection (112th overall).)
4	117	Sidy Sow	G	Eastern Michigan	
5	144	Atonio Mafi	G	UCLA	From Falcons via Raiders (Note: The Patriots traded a fourth-round selection (135th overall) to the Las Vegas Raiders in exchange for fifth- and sixth-round selections (144th and 214th overall).)
6	187	Kayshon Boutte	WR	LSU	From Panthers (Note: The Patriots traded CB Stephon Gilmore to the Carolina Panthers in exchange for a sixth-round selection (187th overall).)
6	192	Bryce Baringer	P	Michigan State	
6	210	Demario Douglas	WR	Liberty	Compensatory pick
6	214	Ameer Speed	CB	Michigan State	Compensatory pick; from Raiders
7	245	Isaiah Bolden	CB	Jackson State	From Bills via Falcons (Note: The Patriots traded TE Jonnu Smith to the Atlanta Falcons in exchange for a seventh-round selection (245th overall).)

2023 New England Patriots undrafted free agents
Name	Position	College	Ref.
Malik Cunningham	QB	Louisville	
Jourdan Heilig	LB	Appalachian State	
Johnny Lumpkin	TE	Louisiana	

Draft trades

== Staff ==
2023 New England Patriots staff
Front office: Chairman/CEO – Robert Kraft; President – Jonathan Kraft; Director of player personnel – Matt Groh; Personnel coordinator – Brian Smith; Director of scouting – Eliot Wolf; Director of pro scouting – Steve Cargile; Director of college scouting – Camren Williams; Director of scouting administration – Nancy Meier; Director of football / head coach administration – Berj Najarian; Director of research – Richard Miller; Head coaches: Head coach – Bill Belichick; Assistant head coach – Joe Judge; Offensive coaches: Offensive coordinator/quarterbacks – Bill O'Brien; Assistant quarterbacks – Evan Rothstein; Running backs – Vinnie Sunseri; Wide receivers/kick returners – Troy Brown; Wide receivers – Ross Douglas; Tight ends – Will Lawing; Offensive line – Adrian Klemm; Assistant offensive line – Billy Yates	Defensive coaches: Defensive line – DeMarcus Covington; Linebackers – Steve Belichick; Linebackers – Jerod Mayo; Cornerbacks – Mike Pellegrino; Safeties – Brian Belichick; NFL coaching fellowship/defense – V'Angelo Bentley; NFL coaching fellowship/defense – Keith Jones; Special teams coaches: Special teams coordinator – Cam Achord; Special teams assistant – Joe Houston; Strength and conditioning: Head strength and conditioning – Moses Cabrera; Strength and conditioning assistant – Deron Mayo; Director of skill development – Joe Kim

== Final roster ==
2023 New England Patriots roster
Quarterbacks (QB): 10 Mac Jones; 13 Nathan Rourke; 4 Bailey Zappe; Running backs (RB): 15 Ezekiel Elliott; 36 Kevin Harris; 39 JaMycal Hasty; Wide receivers (WR): 80 Kayshon Boutte; 81 Demario Douglas; 1 DeVante Parker; 83 Jalen Reagor; 18 Matthew Slater; 11 Tyquan Thornton; Tight ends (TE): 86 Pharaoh Brown; 88 Mike Gesicki; 46 La'Michael Pettway	Offensive linemen (OL): 60 David Andrews C; 67 Jake Andrews C; 77 Trent Brown T; 65 James Ferentz C; 59 Vederian Lowe T; 68 Atonio Mafi G; 71 Michael Onwenu T; 62 Sidy Sow G; Defensive linemen (DL): 90 Christian Barmore NT; 92 Davon Godchaux NT; 93 Lawrence Guy DT; 70 Jeremiah Pharms Jr. DT; 96 Sam Roberts DT; 99 Keion White DE; 91 Deatrich Wise Jr. DE	Linebackers (LB): 8 Ja'Whaun Bentley ILB; 45 Chris Board ILB; 53 Christian Elliss ILB; 33 Anfernee Jennings OLB; 30 Marte Mapu ILB; 48 Jahlani Tavai ILB; 55 Josh Uche OLB; 3 Mack Wilson ILB; Defensive backs (DB): 28 Alex Austin CB; 24 Joshuah Bledsoe FS; 27 Myles Bryant CB; 22 Cody Davis SS; 23 Kyle Dugger SS; 31 Jonathan Jones CB; 2 Jalen Mills FS; 5 Jabrill Peppers FS; 21 Adrian Phillips SS; 41 Brenden Schooler FS; 26 Shaun Wade CB; 19 Marco Wilson CB; Special teams (ST): 17 Bryce Baringer P; 49 Joe Cardona LS; 37 Chad Ryland K	Practice squad: 35 Breon Borders CB; 52 William Bradley-King DE; 44 Joe Giles-Harris ILB; 42 Azizi Hearn CB; 97 Trysten Hill DT; 34 William Hooper CB; 82 T. J. Luther WR; 66 Kody Russey C; 87 Matt Sokol TE; 64 Andrew Stueber T; 43 Ke'Shawn Vaughn RB; Reserve: 76 Calvin Anderson T (IR); -- Isaiah Bolden CB (IR); 84 Kendrick Bourne WR (IR); 95 Daniel Ekuale NT (IR); 6 Christian Gonzalez CB (IR); -- Terez Hall ILB (IR); 85 Hunter Henry TE (IR); 29 J. C. Jackson CB (NF-Ill.); 25 Marcus Jones CB (IR); 9 Matthew Judon OLB (IR); 75 Conor McDermott T (IR); 50 Raekwon McMillan ILB (IR); -- Tre Nixon WR (IR); 74 Riley Reiff T (IR); 7 JuJu Smith-Schuster WR (IR); 38 Rhamondre Stevenson RB (IR); 69 Cole Strange G (IR); 72 Tyrone Wheatley Jr. T (IR); Rookies in italics 53 active, 18 reserve, 11 practice squad

== Preseason ==
Week	Date	Opponent	Result	Record	Venue	Recap
1	August 10	Houston Texans	L 9–20	0–1	Gillette Stadium	Recap
2	August 19 (Note: Due to an injury involving Isaiah Bolden, the game was suspended with around ten minutes to go in the fourth quarter.)	at Green Bay Packers	W 21–17	1–1	Lambeau Field	Recap
3	August 25	at Tennessee Titans	L 7–23	1–2	Nissan Stadium	Recap

== Regular season ==
=== Schedule ===
Week	Date	Opponent	Result	Record	Venue	Recap
1	September 10	Philadelphia Eagles	**L** 20–25	0–1	Gillette Stadium	Recap
2	September 17	**Miami Dolphins**	**L** 17–24	0–2	Gillette Stadium	Recap
3	September 24	at **New York Jets**	**W** 15–10	1–2	MetLife Stadium	Recap
4	October 1	at Dallas Cowboys	**L** 3–38	1–3	AT&T Stadium	Recap
5	October 8	New Orleans Saints	**L** 0–34	1–4	Gillette Stadium	Recap
6	October 15	at Las Vegas Raiders	**L** 17–21	1–5	Allegiant Stadium	Recap
7	October 22	**Buffalo Bills**	**W** 29–25	2–5	Gillette Stadium	Recap
8	October 29	at **Miami Dolphins**	**L** 17–31	2–6	Hard Rock Stadium	Recap
9	November 5	Washington Commanders	**L** 17–20	2–7	Gillette Stadium	Recap
10	November 12	Indianapolis Colts	**L** 6–10	2–8	(Germany) Deutsche Bank Park (Frankfurt)	Recap
11	Bye					
12	November 26	at New York Giants	**L** 7–10	2–9	MetLife Stadium	Recap
13	December 3	Los Angeles Chargers	**L** 0–6	2–10	Gillette Stadium	Recap
14	December 7	at Pittsburgh Steelers	**W** 21–18	3–10	Acrisure Stadium	Recap
15	December 17	Kansas City Chiefs	**L** 17–27	3–11	Gillette Stadium	Recap
16	December 24	at Denver Broncos	**W** 26–23	4–11	Empower Field at Mile High	Recap
17	December 31	at **Buffalo Bills**	**L** 21–27	4–12	Highmark Stadium	Recap
18	January 7	**New York Jets**	**L** 3–17	4–13	Gillette Stadium	Recap

Note: Intra-division opponents are in bold text.

=== Game summaries ===
==== Week 1: vs. Philadelphia Eagles ====
Week 1: Philadelphia Eagles at New England Patriots – Game summary

Quarter	1	2	3	4	Total
**Eagles**	16	0	3	6	**25**
Patriots	0	14	0	6	**20**

at Gillette Stadium, Foxborough, Massachusetts

- Date: September 10
- Game time: 4:25 p.m. EDT
- Game weather: Rain, 71 °F (22 °C)
- Game attendance: 64,628
- Referee: Shawn Hochuli
- TV announcers (CBS): Jim Nantz, Tony Romo and Tracy Wolfson
- Recap, Game Book

Game information

**First quarter**

- PHI – Jake Elliott 32-yard field goal, 7:42. Eagles 3–0. **Drive: 14 plays, 61 yards, 7:18.**
- PHI – Darius Slay 70-yard interception return (Jake Elliott kick), 4:56. Eagles 10–0.
- PHI – DeVonta Smith 5-yard pass from Jalen Hurts (kick failed), 2:39. Eagles 16–0. **Drive: 4 plays, 26 yards, 2:09.**

**Second quarter**

- NE – Hunter Henry 9-yard pass from Mac Jones (Chad Ryland kick), 4:34. Eagles 16–7. **Drive: 10 plays, 71 yards, 4:48.**
- NE – Kendrick Bourne 19-yard pass from Mac Jones (Chad Ryland kick), 0:25. Eagles 16–14. **Drive: 6 plays, 63 yards, 2:08.**

**Third quarter**

- PHI – Jake Elliott 56-yard field goal, 8:48. Eagles 19–14. **Drive: 10 plays, 33 yards, 4:55.**

**Fourth quarter**

- PHI – Jake Elliott 48-yard field goal, 13:21. Eagles 22–14. **Drive: 11 plays, 50 yards, 4:22.**
- PHI – Jake Elliott 51-yard field goal, 5:33. Eagles 25–14. **Drive: 7 plays, 50 yards, 3:59.**
- NE – Kendrick Bourne 11-yard pass from Mac Jones (pass failed), 3:37. Eagles 25–20. **Drive: 6 plays, 75 yards, 1:56.**

**Top passers**

- PHI – Jalen Hurts – 22/33, 170 yards, TD
- NE – Mac Jones – 35/54, 316 yards, 3 TD, INT

**Top rushers**

- PHI – Kenneth Gainwell – 14 rushes, 54 yards
- NE – Ezekiel Elliott – 7 rushes, 29 yards

**Top receivers**

- PHI – A. J. Brown – 7 receptions, 79 yards
- NE – Kendrick Bourne – 6 receptions, 64 yards, 2 TD

In the Patriots season opener, they hosted the Eagles. On a day where the team honored longtime quarterback Tom Brady in their halftime ceremony, it was spoiled by an Eagles victory. The loss was the team's third consecutive season where they lost their season opener. The Patriots started off the season 0–1.

==== Week 2: vs. Miami Dolphins ====
Week 2: Miami Dolphins at New England Patriots – Game summary

Quarter	1	2	3	4	Total
**Dolphins**	3	14	0	7	**24**
Patriots	0	3	0	14	**17**

at Gillette Stadium, Foxborough, Massachusetts

- Date: September 17
- Game time: 8:20 p.m. EDT
- Game weather: Clear, 63 °F (17 °C)
- Game attendance: 64,628
- Referee: Shawn Smith
- TV announcers (NBC): Mike Tirico, Cris Collinsworth and Melissa Stark
- Recap, Game Book

Game information

**First quarter**

- MIA – Jason Sanders 23-yard field goal, 3:00. Dolphins 3–0. **Drive: 13 plays, 81 yards, 7:13.**

**Second quarter**

- MIA – Raheem Mostert 8-yard rush (Jason Sanders kick), 9:39. Dolphins 10–0. **Drive: 11 plays, 73 yards, 5:21.**
- NE – Chad Ryland 49-yard field goal, 1:49. Dolphins 10–3. **Drive: 10 plays, 35 yards, 3:55.**
- MIA – Tyreek Hill 2-yard pass from Tua Tagovailoa (Jason Sanders kick), 0:11. Dolphins 17–3. **Drive: 8 plays, 75 yards, 1:38.**

**Fourth quarter**

- NE – Hunter Henry 6-yard pass from Mac Jones (Chad Ryland kick), 11:21. Dolphins 17–10. **Drive: 8 plays, 58 yards, 3:26.**
- MIA – Raheem Mostert 43-yard rush (Jason Sanders kick), 8:45. Dolphins 24–10. **Drive: 1 play, 43 yards, 0:07.**
- NE – Rhamondre Stevenson 2-yard rush (Chad Ryland kick), 5:25. Dolphins 24–17. **Drive: 9 plays, 75 yards, 3:20.**

**Top passers**

- MIA – Tua Tagovailoa – 21/30, 249 yards, TD, INT
- NE – Mac Jones – 31/42, 231 yards, TD, INT

**Top rushers**

- MIA – Raheem Mostert – 18 rushes, 121 yards, 2 TD
- NE – Rhamondre Stevenson – 15 rushes, 50 yards, TD

**Top receivers**

- MIA – Jaylen Waddle – 4 receptions, 86 yards
- NE – DeVante Parker – 6 receptions, 57 yards

With the loss, the Patriots started 0-2 for the first time since 2001.

==== Week 3: at New York Jets ====
Week 3: New England Patriots at New York Jets – Game summary

Quarter	1	2	3	4	Total
**Patriots**	3	7	3	2	**15**
Jets	0	3	0	7	**10**

at MetLife Stadium, East Rutherford, New Jersey

- Date: September 24
- Game time: 1:00 p.m. EDT
- Game weather: Rain, 65 °F (18 °C)
- Game attendance: 80,878
- Referee: Bill Vinovich
- TV announcers (CBS): Jim Nantz, Tony Romo and Tracy Wolfson
- Recap, Game Book

Game information

**First quarter**

- NE – Chad Ryland 48-yard field goal, 10:41. Patriots 3–0. **Drive: 7 plays, 29 yards, 2:37.**

**Second quarter**

- NE – Pharaoh Brown 58-yard pass from Mac Jones (Chad Ryland kick), 11:38. Patriots 10–0. **Drive: 4 plays, 78 yards, 2:09.**
- NYJ – Greg Zuerlein 52-yard field goal, 1:21. Patriots 10–3. **Drive: 10 plays, 33 yards, 6:08.**

**Third quarter**

- NE – Chad Ryland 51-yard field goal, 10:26. Patriots 13–3. **Drive: 10 plays, 42 yards, 4:34.**

**Fourth quarter**

- NYJ – Nick Bawden 1-yard run (Greg Zuerlein kick), 5:24. Patriots 13–10. **Drive: 13 plays, 87 yards, 5:22.**
- NE – Zach Wilson sacked in end zone by Matthew Judon for a safety, 2:19. Patriots 15–10.

**Top passers**

- NE – Mac Jones – 15/29, 201 yards, TD
- NYJ – Zach Wilson – 18/36, 157 yards

**Top rusher'**

- NE – Ezekiel Elliott – 16 rushes, 80 yards
- NYJ – Breece Hall – 12 rushes, 18 yards

**Top receiver**

- NE – Pharaoh Brown – 2 receptions, 71 yards, TD
- NYJ – Garrett Wilson – 5 receptions, 48 yards

The Patriots picked up their first win of the season, improving to 1–2. Additionally, this win marked the team's 15th straight victory over the Jets in their rivalry, dating back to 2016.

==== Week 4: at Dallas Cowboys ====
Week 4: New England Patriots at Dallas Cowboys – Game summary

Quarter	1	2	3	4	Total
Patriots	3	0	0	0	**3**
**Cowboys**	10	18	3	7	**38**

at AT&T Stadium, Arlington, Texas

- Date: October 1
- Game time: 4:25 p.m. EST/3:25 p.m. CST
- Game weather: None (retractable roof closed)
- Game attendance: 93,719
- Referee: Scott Novak
- TV announcers (Fox): Kevin Burkhardt, Greg Olsen, Erin Andrews and Tom Rinaldi
- Recap, Game Book

Game information

**First quarter**

- DAL – Brandon Aubrey 23-yard field goal, 10:52. Cowboys 3–0. **Drive: 10 plays, 70 yards, 4:08.**
- NE – Chad Ryland 29-yard field goal, 6:41. Tied 3–3. **Drive: 8 plays, 64 yards, 4:11.**
- DAL – CeeDee Lamb 20-yard pass from Dak Prescott (Brandon Aubrey kick), 1:30. Cowboys 10–3. **Drive: 10 plays, 75 yards, 5:11.**

**Second quarter**

- DAL – Leighton Vander Esch 11-yard fumble return (Bryan Anger-Chauncey Golston pass), 11:09. Cowboys 18–3.
- DAL – Brandon Aubrey 23-yard field goal, 4:03. Cowboys 21–3. **Drive: 11 plays, 73 yards, 5:33.**
- DAL – DaRon Bland 54-yard interception return (Brandon Aubrey kick), 0:54. Cowboys 28–3.

**Third quarter**

- DAL – Brandon Aubrey 33-yard field goal, 7:42. Cowboys 31–3. **Drive: 10 plays, 37 yards, 4:01.**

**Fourth quarter**

- DAL – Hunter Luepke 3-yard run (Brandon Aubrey kick), 6:38. Cowboys 38–3. **Drive: 7 plays, 63 yards, 4:21.**

**Top passers**

- NE – Mac Jones – 12/21, 150 yards, 2 INT
- DAL – Dak Prescott – 28/34, 261 yards, TD

**Top rushers**

- NE – Rhamondre Stevenson – 14 rushes, 30 yards
- DAL – Tony Pollard – 11 rushes, 47 yards

**Top receivers**

- NE – Hunter Henry – 4 receptions, 51 yards
- DAL – Jake Ferguson – 7 receptions, 77 yards

Bill Belichick endured his worst loss ever as a head coach. Two defensive touchdowns by the Cowboys sealed the defeat. The Patriots dropped to 1–3 after this game.

==== Week 5: vs. New Orleans Saints ====
Week 5: New Orleans Saints at New England Patriots – Game summary

Quarter	1	2	3	4	Total
**Saints**	7	14	3	10	**34**
Patriots	0	0	0	0	**0**

at Gillette Stadium, Foxborough, Massachusetts

- Date: October 8
- Game time: 1:00 p.m. EDT
- Game weather: Sunny, 61 °F (16 °C)
- Game attendance: 64,628
- Referee: Alex Kemp
- TV announcers (CBS): Kevin Harlan, Trent Green and Melanie Collins
- Recap, Game Book

Game information

**First quarter**

- NO – Tyrann Mathieu 27-yard interception return (Blake Grupe kick), 7:02. Saints 7–0.

**Second quarter**

- NO – Alvin Kamara 2-yard run (Blake Grupe kick), 14:23. Saints 14–0. **Drive: 8 plays, 62 yards, 4:16.**
- NO – Chris Olave 5-yard pass from Derek Carr (Blake Grupe kick), 10:47. Saints 21–0. **Drive: 5 plays, 59 yards, 2:35.**

**Third quarter**

- NO – Blake Groupe 54-yard field goal, 11:34. Saints 24–0. **Drive: 4 plays, 6 yards, 2:26.**

**Fourth quarter**

- NO – Foster Moreau 6-yard pass from Derek Carr (Blake Grupe kick), 13:03. Saints 31–0. **Drive: 6 plays, 31 yards, 3:04.**
- NO – Blake Grupe 53-yard field goal, 5:43. Saints 34–0. **Drive: 4 plays, 2 yards, 1:32.**

**Top passers**

- NO – Derek Carr – 18/26, 183 yards, 2 TD
- NE – Mac Jones – 12/22, 110 yards, 2 INT

**Top rushers**

- NO – Alvin Kamara – 22 rushes, 80 yards, TD
- NE – Rhamondre Stevenson – 8 rushes, 24 yards

**Top receivers**

- NO – Michael Thomas – 4 receptions, 65 yards
- NE – Kendrick Bourne – 2 receptions, 43 yards

For the second straight week, the Patriots failed to score a touchdown. This was the team's first shutout loss since 2016. They dropped to 1–4.

==== Week 6: at Las Vegas Raiders ====
Week 6: New England Patriots at Las Vegas Raiders – Game summary

Quarter	1	2	3	4	Total
Patriots	0	3	7	7	**17**
**Raiders**	3	10	3	5	**21**

at Allegiant Stadium, Paradise, Nevada

- Date: October 15
- Game time: 4:05 p.m. EDT/1:05 p.m. PDT
- Game weather: None (indoor stadium)
- Game attendance: 61,985
- Referee: Brad Rogers
- TV announcers (CBS): Jim Nantz, Tony Romo and Tracy Wolfson
- Recap, Game Book

Game information

**First quarter**

- LV – Daniel Carlson 25-yard field goal, 6:54. Raiders 3–0. **Drive: 16 plays, 69 yards, 8:06.**

**Second quarter**

- LV – Jakobi Meyers 12-yard pass from Jimmy Garoppolo (Daniel Carlson kick), 12:22. Raiders 10–0. **Drive: 8 plays, 59 yards, 4:14.**
- NE – Chad Ryland 43-yard field goal, 8:38. Raiders 10–3. **Drive: 9 plays, 57 yards, 3:44.**
- LV – Daniel Carlson 37-yard field goal, 0:10. Raiders 13–3. **Drive: 10 plays, 47 yards, 3:26.**

**Third quarter**

- NE – Ezekiel Elliott 2-yard run (Chad Ryland kick), 8:56. Raiders 13–10. **Drive: 10 plays, 75 yards, 6:04.**
- LV – Daniel Carlson 30-yard field goal, 3:55. Raiders 16–10. **Drive: 10 plays, 63 yards, 5:01.**

**Fourth quarter**

- LV – Daniel Carlson 24-yard field goal, 13:03. Raiders 19–10. **Drive: 9 plays, 59 yards, 4:24.**
- NE – Rhamondre Stevenson 1-yard run (Chad Ryland kick), 3:33. Raiders 19–17. **Drive: 17 plays, 75 yards, 9:30.**
- LV – Mac Jones sacked in end zone for a Safety, 1:47. Raiders 21–17.

**Top passers**

- NE – Mac Jones – 24/33, 200 yards, INT
- LV – Jimmy Garoppolo – 14/22, 162 yards, TD, INT

**Top rushers**

- NE – Rhamondre Stevenson – 10 rushes, 46 yards, TD
- LV – Josh Jacobs – 25 rushes, 77 yards

**Top receivers**

- NE – Kendrick Bourne – 10 receptions, 89 yards
- LV – Michael Mayer – 5 receptions, 75 yards

The Patriots lost to the Raiders for the second year in a row, and had their worst start in the Bill Belichick era. They dropped to 1–5 for the first time since 1995.

==== Week 7: vs. Buffalo Bills ====
Week 7: Buffalo Bills at New England Patriots – Game summary

Quarter	1	2	3	4	Total
Bills	0	3	7	15	**25**
**Patriots**	10	3	3	13	**29**

at Gillette Stadium, Foxborough, Massachusetts

- Date: October 22
- Game time: 1:00 p.m. EDT
- Game weather: Partly cloudy, 55 °F (13 °C)
- Game attendance: 64,628
- Referee: Clete Blakeman
- TV announcers (CBS): Ian Eagle, Charles Davis and Evan Washburn
- Recap, Game Book

Game information

**First quarter**

- NE – Chad Ryland 30-yard field goal, 3:19. Patriots 3–0. **Drive: 9 plays, 63 yards, 4:58.**
- NE – Ezekiel Elliott 2-yard run (Chad Ryland kick), 6:58. Patriots 10–0. **Drive: 7 plays, 45 yards, 2:49.**

**Second quarter**

- BUF – Tyler Bass 36-yard field goal, 14:49. Patriots 10–3. **Drive: 13 plays, 57 yards, 7:09.**
- NE – Chad Ryland 24-yard field goal, 7:36. Patriots 13–3. **Drive: 5 plays, 40 yards, 2:44.**

**Third quarter**

- BUF – James Cook 8-yard pass from Josh Allen (Tyler Bass kick), 9:53. Patriots 13–10. **Drive: 10 plays, 81 yards, 5:07.**
- NE – Chad Ryland 49-yard field goal, 4:30. Patriots 16–10. **Drive: 9 plays, 44 yards, 5:23.**

**Fourth quarter**

- NE – Kendrick Bourne 4-yard pass from Mac Jones (run failed), 7:36. Patriots 22–10. **Drive: 9 plays, 66 yards, 6:07.**
- BUF – Stefon Diggs 25-yard pass from Josh Allen (Tyler Bass kick), 5:32. Patriots 22–17. **Drive: 5 plays, 75 yards, 2:04.**
- BUF – Josh Allen 1-yard run (Josh Allen–Dawson Knox pass), 1:58. Bills 25–22. **Drive: 8 plays, 29 yards, 2:58.**
- NE – Mike Gesicki 1-yard pass from Mac Jones (Chad Ryland kick), 0:12. Patriots 29–25. **Drive: 8 plays, 75 yards, 1:46.**

**Top passers**

- BUF – Josh Allen – 27/41, 265 yards, 2 TD, INT
- NE – Mac Jones – 25/30, 272 yards, 2 TD

**Top rushers**

- BUF – James Cook – 13 rushes, 56 yards
- NE – Rhamondre Stevenson – 9 rushes, 34 yards

**Top receivers**

- BUF – Dalton Kincaid – 8 receptions, 75 yards
- NE – Kendrick Bourne – 6 receptions, 63 yards, TD

This win, their first in three games, as well as their first against the Bills in two years, marks Bill Belichick's 300th in his head coaching career. This would end up being the Patriots' only win at home this season.

==== Week 8: at Miami Dolphins ====
Week 8: New England Patriots at Miami Dolphins – Game summary

Quarter	1	2	3	4	Total
Patriots	7	0	3	7	**17**
**Dolphins**	7	10	7	7	**31**

at Hard Rock Stadium, Miami Gardens, Florida

- Date: October 29
- Game time: 1:00 p.m. EDT
- Game weather: Partly cloudy, 83 °F (28 °C)
- Game attendance: 65,836
- Referee: Land Clark
- TV announcers (CBS): Spero Dedes, Adam Archuleta and Aditi Kinkhabwala
- Recap, Game Book

Game information

**First quarter**

- NE – Kendrick Bourne 24-yard pass from Mac Jones (Chad Ryland kick), 3:32. Patriots 7–0. **Drive: 3 plays, 30 yards, 0:54.**
- MIA – Tyreek Hill 42-yard pass from Tua Tagovailoa (Jason Sanders kick), 0:22. Tied 7–7. **Drive: 6 plays, 75 yards, 3:10.**

**Second quarter**

- MIA – Cedrick Wilson Jr. 1-yard pass from Tua Tagovailoa (Jason Sanders kick), 6:10. Dolphins 14–7. **Drive: 14 plays, 53 yard, 7:25.**
- MIA – Jason Sanders 30-yard field goal, 0:26. Dolphins 17–7. **Drive: 8 plays, 28 yards, 1:22.**

**Third quarter**

- NE – Chad Ryland 38-yard field goal, 12:45. Dolphins 17–10. **Drive: 4 plays, 1 yard, 2:10.**
- MIA – Raheem Mostert 1-yard run (Jason Sanders kick), 7:35. Dolphins 24–10. **Drive: 9 plays, 77 yards, 5:10.**

**Fourth quarter**

- NE – JuJu Smith-Schuster 3-yard pass from Mac Jones (Chad Ryland kick), 8:30. Dolphins 24–17. **Drive: 13 plays, 81 yards, 5:17.**
- MIA – Jaylen Waddle 31-yard pass from Tua Tagovailoa (Jason Sanders kick), 2:43. Dolphins 31–17. **Drive: 10 plays, 75 yards, 5:47.**

**Top passers**

- MIA – Mac Jones – 19/29, 161 yards, 2 TD, INT
- NE – Tua Tagovailoa – 30/45, 324 yards, 3 TD, INT

**Top rushers**

- NE – Rhamondre Stevenson – 10 rushes, 39 yards
- MIA – Raheem Mostert – 13 rushes, 46 yards, TD

**Top receivers**

- NE – Demario Douglas – 5 receptions, 25 yards
- MIA – Tyreek Hill – 8 receptions, 112 yards, TD

For the second time in three years, the Patriots got swept by the Dolphins.

==== Week 9: vs. Washington Commanders ====
Week 9: Washington Commanders at New England Patriots – Game summary

Quarter	1	2	3	4	Total
**Commanders**	3	7	10	0	**20**
Patriots	0	14	3	0	**17**

at Gillette Stadium, Foxborough, Massachusetts

- Date: November 5
- Game time: 1:00 p.m. EST
- Game weather: Mostly sunny, 62 °F (17 °C)
- Game attendance: 64,628
- Referee: Adrian Hill
- TV announcers (Fox): Kenny Albert, Jonathan Vilma and Shannon Spake
- Recap, Game Book

Game information

**First quarter**

- WAS – Joey Slye 37-yard field goal, 3:14. Commanders 3–0. **Drive: 9 plays, 42 yards, 5:20.**

**Second quarter**

- WAS – Brian Robinson Jr. 9-yard run (Joey Slye kick), 12:05. Commanders 10–0. **Drive: 11 plays, 80 yards, 5:16.**
- NE – Hunter Henry 14-yard pass from Mac Jones (Chad Ryland kick), 9:26. Commanders 10–7. **Drive: 3 plays, 25 yards, 0:59.**
- NE – Rhamondre Stevenson 64-yard run (Chad Ryland kick), 6:06. Patriots 14–10. **Drive: 2 plays, 84 yards, 0:35.**

**Third quarter**

- NE – Chad Ryland 43-yard field goal, 10:14. Patriots 17–10. **Drive: 12 plays, 51 yards, 4:46.**
- WAS – Jahan Dotson 33-yard pass from Sam Howell (Joey Slye kick), 6:51. Tied 17–17. **Drive: 7 plays, 75 yards, 3:23.**
- WAS – Joey Slye 30-yard field goal, 1:49. Commanders 20–17. **Drive: 8 plays, 65 yards, 2:50.**

**Fourth quarter**

- No scoring plays.

**Top passers**

- WAS – Sam Howell – 29/45, 325 yards, TD, INT
- NE – Mac Jones – 24/44, 240 yards, TD, INT

**Top rushers**

- WAS – Brian Robinson Jr. – 18 rushes, 63 yards, TD
- NE – Rhamondre Stevenson – 9 rushes, 87 yards, TD

**Top receivers**

- WAS – Terry McLaurin – 5 receptions, 73 yards
- NE – Demario Douglas – 5 receptions, 55 yards

With their first loss to Washington since 2003, the Patriots fell to 2-7. This was also their first home loss to the Commanders since 1996.

==== Week 10: vs. Indianapolis Colts ====
NFL Germany games

Week 10: Indianapolis Colts at New England Patriots – Game summary

Quarter	1	2	3	4	Total
**Colts**	7	0	0	3	**10**
Patriots	3	0	0	3	**6**

at Deutsche Bank Park, Frankfurt, Hesse, Germany

- Date: November 12
- Game time: 3:30 p.m. CET/9:30 a.m. EST
- Game weather: Cloudy, 47 °F (8 °C)
- Game attendance: 50,144
- Referee: Tra Blake
- TV announcers (WCVB/NFLN): Rich Eisen, Jason McCourty, Sara Walsh and Stacey Dales
- Recap, Game Book

Game information

**First quarter**

- NE – Chad Ryland 37-yard field goal, 8:11. Patriots 3–0. **Drive: 13 plays, 61 yards, 6:49.**
- IND – Jonathan Taylor 1-yard run (Matt Gay kick), 0:58. Colts 7–3. **Drive: 14 plays, 75 yards, 7:13.**

**Second quarter**

- No scoring plays.

**Third quarter**

- No scoring plays.

**Fourth quarter**

- NE – Chad Ryland 24-yard field goal, 12:44. Colts 7–6. **Drive: 15 plays, 89 yards, 8:04.**
- IND – Matt Gay 51-yard field goal, 8:54. Colts 10–6. **Drive: 7 plays, 20 yards, 3:50.**

**Top passers**

- IND – Gardner Minshew – 18/28, 194 yards, INT
- NE – Mac Jones – 15/20, 170 yards, INT

**Top rushers**

- IND – Jonathan Taylor – 23 rushes, 69 yards, TD
- NE – Rhamondre Stevenson – 20 rushes, 88 yards

**Top receivers**

- IND – Michael Pittman Jr. – 8 receptions, 84 yards
- NE – Demario Douglas – 6 receptions, 84 yards

This was the Patriots' first-ever regular season game in Germany and were the designated home team; this was their first "home" loss to the Colts since 2006. The Patriots would enter their Week 11 bye at 2-8.

==== Week 12: at New York Giants ====
Week 12: New England Patriots at New York Giants – Game summary

Quarter	1	2	3	4	Total
Patriots	0	0	7	0	**7**
**Giants**	0	7	0	3	**10**

at MetLife Stadium, East Rutherford, New Jersey

- Date: November 26
- Game time: 1:00 p.m. EST
- Game weather: Mostly cloudy, 43 °F (6 °C)
- Game attendance: 82,211
- Referee: Scott Novak
- TV announcers (Fox): Kenny Albert, Jonathan Vilma and Shannon Spake
- Recap, Game Book

Game information

**First quarter**

- No scoring plays.

**Second quarter**

- NYG – Isaiah Hodgins 12-yard pass from Tommy DeVito (Randy Bullock kick), 1:53. Giants 7–0. **Drive: 6 plays, 26 yards, 2:34.**

**Third quarter**

- NE – Rhamondre Stevenson 7-yard run (Chad Ryland kick), 8:02. Tied 7–7. **Drive: 11 plays, 60 yards, 6:58.**

**Fourth quarter**

- NYG – Randy Bullock 42-yard field goal, 8:10. Giants 10–7. **Drive: 7 plays, 8 yards, 4:21.**

**Top passers**

- NE – Mac Jones – 12/21, 89 yards, 2 INT
- NYG – Tommy DeVito – 17/25, 191 yards, TD

**Top rushers**

- NE – Rhamondre Stevenson – 21 rushes, 98 yards, TD
- NYG – Saquon Barkley – 12 rushes, 46 yards

**Top receivers**

- NE – Demario Douglas – 6 receptions, 49 yards
- NYG – Jalin Hyatt – 5 receptions, 109 yards

Chad Ryland missing a game-tying field goal with 6 seconds left would result in the Patriots dropping to 2-9 with their first road loss against the Giants since 1987. As a result, New England was swept by the NFC East and finished 0-5 against the NFC. This would also be the last time that Mac Jones would serve as the starting quarterback of the Patriots.

==== Week 13: vs. Los Angeles Chargers ====
Week 13: Los Angeles Chargers at New England Patriots – Game summary

Quarter	1	2	3	4	Total
**Chargers**	0	6	0	0	**6**
Patriots	0	0	0	0	**0**

at Gillette Stadium, Foxborough, Massachusetts

- Date: December 3
- Game time: 1:00 p.m. EST
- Game weather: Rain, 44 °F (7 °C)
- Game attendance: 64,628
- Referee: Bill Vinovich
- TV announcers (CBS): Spero Dedes, Adam Archuleta and Aditi Kinkhabwala
- Recap, Game Book

Game information

**First quarter**

- No scoring plays.

**Second quarter**

- LAC – Cameron Dicker 38-yard field goal, 9:09. Chargers 3–0. **Drive: 7 plays, 27 yards, 2:26.**
- LAC – Cameron Dicker 38-yard field goal, 0:44. Chargers 6–0. **Drive: 4 plays, 7 yards, 0:50.**

**Third quarter**

- No scoring plays.

**Fourth quarter**

- No scoring plays.

**Top passers**

- LAC – Justin Herbert – 22/37, 212 yards
- NE – Bailey Zappe – 13/25, 141 yards

**Top rushers**

- LAC – Austin Ekeler – 14 rushes, 18 yards
- NE – Ezekiel Elliott – 17 rushes, 52 yards

**Top receivers**

- LAC – Keenan Allen – 5 receptions, 58 yards
- NE – DeVante Parker – 4 rushes, 64 yards

The Patriots fell to 2–10, securing their first season with 10 or more losses since 2000, which was Belichick's first season coaching the team. This was the Patriots' first five-game losing streak since 1995. Plus, this was the first time in franchise history that the Patriots were shut out at home twice in a season. Also, the Patriots became the first team since the 1938 Cardinals to allow 10 or fewer points in three consecutive games and lose all of them. In addition it was their first loss to the Chargers since 2008.

==== Week 14: at Pittsburgh Steelers ====
Week 14: New England Patriots at Pittsburgh Steelers – Game summary

Quarter	1	2	3	4	Total
**Patriots**	7	14	0	0	**21**
Steelers	3	7	0	8	**18**

at Acrisure Stadium, Pittsburgh, Pennsylvania

- Date: December 7
- Game time: 8:15 p.m. EST
- Game weather: Partly cloudy, 42 °F (6 °C)
- Game attendance: 66,376
- Referee: Clay Martin
- TV announcers (WFXT/Prime Video): Al Michaels, Kirk Herbstreit and Kaylee Hartung
- Recap, Game Book

Game information

**First quarter**

- NE – Ezekiel Elliott 11-yard pass from Bailey Zappe (Chad Ryland kick), 11:12. Patriots 7–0. **Drive: 8 plays, 75 yards, 3:48.**
- PIT – Chris Boswell 56-yard field goal, 6:39. Patriots 7–3. **Drive: 7 plays, 31 yards, 4:33.**

**Second quarter**

- NE – Hunter Henry 7-yard pass from Bailey Zappe (Chad Ryland kick), 14:14. Patriots 14–3. **Drive: 2 plays, 11 yards, 0:33.**
- NE – Hunter Henry 24-yard pass from Bailey Zappe (Chad Ryland kick), 7:38. Patriots 21–3. **Drive: 4 plays, 59 yards, 2:10.**
- PIT – Diontae Johnson 25-yard pass from Mitchell Trubisky (Chris Boswell kick), 2:50. Patriots 21–10. **Drive: 8 plays, 75 yards, 4:48.**

**Third quarter**

- No scoring plays.

**Fourth quarter**

- PIT – Mitchell Trubisky 1-yard run (Mitchell Trubisky–Pat Freiermuth pass), 11:44. Patriots 21–18. **Drive: 4 plays, 26 yards, 1:39.**

**Top passers**

- NE – Bailey Zappe – 19/28, 240 yards, 3 TD, INT
- PIT – Mitchell Trubisky – 22/35, 190 yards, TD, INT

**Top rushers**

- NE – Ezekiel Elliott – 22 rushes, 68 yards
- PIT – Mitchell Trubisky – 8 rushes, 30 yards, TD

**Top receivers**

- NE – Ezekiel Elliott – 7 receptions, 72 yards, TD
- PIT – George Pickens – 5 receptions, 19 yards

The win not only snapped the Patriots' five-game losing streak but also marked their 3rd win over Pittsburgh since 2019. On top of that, the Patriots scored more points in this game than in their previous three games combined. However, the Patriots were eliminated from postseason contention when the Bengals defeated the Colts the following Sunday.

==== Week 15: vs. Kansas City Chiefs ====
Week 15: Kansas City Chiefs at New England Patriots – Game summary

Quarter	1	2	3	4	Total
**Chiefs**	7	7	13	0	**27**
Patriots	0	10	0	7	**17**

at Gillette Stadium, Foxborough, Massachusetts

- Date: December 17
- Game time: 1:00 p.m. EST
- Game weather: Cloudy, 53 °F (12 °C)
- Game attendance: 64,628
- Referee: Shawn Hochuli
- TV announcers (Fox): Joe Davis, Daryl Johnston and Pam Oliver
- Recap, Game Book

Game information

**First quarter**

- KC – Rashee Rice 4-yard pass from Jerick McKinnon (Harrison Butker kick), 1:30. Chiefs 7–0. **Drive: 4 plays, 69 yards, 2:05.**

**Second quarter**

- NE – Hunter Henry 16-yard pass from Bailey Zappe (Chad Ryland kick), 7:09. Tied 7–7. **Drive: 10 plays, 61 yards, 5:47.**
- NE – Chad Ryland 25-yard field goal, 4:47. Patriots 10–7. **Drive: 4 plays, 1 yard, 2:10.**
- KC – Jerick McKinnon 8-yard pass from Patrick Mahomes (Harrison Butker kick), 0:35. Chiefs 14–10. **Drive: 11 plays, 75 yards, 4:12.**

**Third quarter**

- KC – Harrison Butker 29-yard field goal, 10:29. Chiefs 17–10. **Drive: 11 plays, 64 yards, 4:31.**
- KC – Clyde Edwards-Helaire 6-yard pass from Patrick Mahomes (Harrison Butker kick), 9:22. Chiefs 24–10. **Drive: 2 plays, 7 yards, 0:49.**
- KC – Harrison Butker 54-yard field goal, 3:40. Chiefs 27–10. **Drive: 6 plays, 39 yards, 2:53.**

**Fourth quarter**

- NE – Kevin Harris 18-yard run (Chad Ryland kick), 8:24. Chiefs 27–17. **Drive: 2 plays, 29 yards, 0:44.**

**Top passers**

- KC – Patrick Mahomes – 27/37, 305 yards, 2 TD, 2 INT
- NE – Bailey Zappe – 23/31, 180 yards, TD, INT

**Top rushers**

- KC – Clyde Edwards-Helaire – 13 rushes, 37 yards
- NE – Ezekiel Elliott – 11 rushes, 25 yards

**Top receivers**

- KC – Rashee Rice – 9 receptions, 91 yards, TD
- NE – Hunter Henry – 7 receptions, 66 yards, TD

This marked the 3rd time the Patriots lost to the Chiefs since 2019, having not won against them since the 2018 playoffs.

==== Week 16: at Denver Broncos ====
Week 16: New England Patriots at Denver Broncos – Game summary

Quarter	1	2	3	4	Total
**Patriots**	0	3	20	3	**26**
Broncos	7	0	0	16	**23**

at Empower Field at Mile High, Denver, Colorado

- Date: December 24
- Game time: 8:15 p.m. EST/6:15 p.m. MST
- Game weather: Mostly cloudy, 28 °F (−2 °C)
- Game attendance: 76,201
- Referee: Carl Cheffers
- TV announcers (WCVB/NFLN): Rich Eisen, Kurt Warner, James Palmer and Sherree Burruss
- Recap, Game Book

Game information

**First quarter**

- DEN – Javonte Williams 3-yard run (Wil Lutz kick), 5:15. Broncos 7–0. **Drive: 5 plays, 25 yards, 2:46.**

**Second quarter**

- NE – Chad Ryland 33-yard field goal, 13:30. Broncos 7–3. **Drive: 13 plays, 61 yards, 6:45.**

**Third quarter**

- NE – Ezekiel Elliott 15-yard pass from Bailey Zappe (kick failed), 9:54. Patriots 9–7. **Drive: 5 plays, 70 yards, 2:56.**
- NE – Mike Gesicki 11-yard pass from Bailey Zappe (Chad Ryland kick), 1:34. Patriots 16–7. **Drive: 5 plays, 42 yards, 2:54.**
- NE – Cody Davis 1-yard fumble return (Chad Ryland kick), 1:28. Patriots 23–7.

**Fourth quarter**

- DEN – Lucas Krull 3-yard pass from Russell Wilson (Russell Wilson–Brandon Johnson pass), 8:33. Patriots 23–15. **Drive: 9 plays, 83 yards, 4:38.**
- DEN – Brandon Johnson 21-yard pass from Russell Wilson (Russell Wilson–Javonte Williams pass), 2:53. Tied 23–23. **Drive: 11 plays, 78 yards, 3:40.**
- NE – Chad Ryland 56-yard field goal, 0:07. Patriots 26–23. **Drive: 7 plays, 43 yards, 0:56.**

**Top passers**

- NE – Bailey Zappe – 25/33, 256 yards, 2 TD
- DEN – Russell Wilson – 25/37, 238 yards, 2 TD

**Top rushers**

- NE – Ezekiel Elliot – 12 rushes, 27 yards
- DEN – Jaleel McLaughlin – 6 rushes, 37 yards

**Top receivers**

- NE – Demario Douglas – 5 receptions, 74 yards
- DEN – Marvin Mims – 3 receptions, 63 yards

With their first win against Russell Wilson since 2014, the Patriots improved to 4-10 and finished 1-3 against the AFC West. This victory over Denver marked Bill Belichick's final win as head coach of the New England Patriots.

==== Week 17: at Buffalo Bills ====
Week 17: New England Patriots at Buffalo Bills – Game summary

Quarter	1	2	3	4	Total
Patriots	7	7	0	7	**21**
**Bills**	13	7	7	0	**27**

at Highmark Stadium, Orchard Park, New York

- Date: December 31
- Game time: 1:00 p.m. EST
- Game weather: Cloudy, 35 °F (2 °C)
- Game attendance: 70,772
- Referee: Alan Eck
- TV announcers (CBS): Kevin Harlan, Trent Green and Melanie Collins
- Recap, Game Book

Game information

**First quarter**

- NE – Jalen Reagor 98-yard kickoff return (Chad Ryland kick), 14:48. Patriots 7–0. **Drive: 0 plays, 0 yards, 0:12.**
- BUF – Tyler Bass 35-yard field goal, 12:07. Patriots 7–3. **Drive: 4 plays, 4 yards, 0:53.**
- BUF – Josh Allen 1-yard run (Tyler Bass kick), 6:37. Bills 10–7. **Drive: 4 plays, 14 yards, 1:57.**
- BUF – Tyler Bass 24-yard field goal, 2:16. Bills 13–7. **Drive: 7 plays, 24 yards, 3:35.**

**Second quarter**

- BUF – Rasul Douglas 40-yard interception return (Tyler Bass kick), 12:36. Bills 20–7.
- NE – Bailey Zappe 17-yard run (Chad Ryland kick), 9:44. Bills 20–14. **Drive: 6 plays, 75 yards, 2:52.**

**Third quarter**

- BUF – Josh Allen 1-yard run (Tyler Bass kick), 10:42. Bills 27–14. **Drive: 8 plays, 75 yards, 4:18.**

**Fourth quarter**

- NE – Ezekiel Elliott 6-yard run (Chad Ryland kick), 11:01. Bills 27–21. **Drive: 7 plays, 84 yards, 3:09.**

**Top passers**

- NE – Bailey Zappe – 16/26, 209 yards, 3 INT
- BUF – Josh Allen – 15/30, 169 yards, INT

**Top rushers**

- NE – Ezekiel Elliot – 14 rushes, 39 yards, TD
- BUF – James Cook – 16 rushes, 48 yards

**Top receivers**

- NE – Mike Gesicki – 4 receptions, 35 yards
- BUF – Dalton Kincaid – 4 receptions, 87 yards

This was the second time in three seasons these teams split the series. With the loss, the Patriots fell to 4–12, setting a new record for most losses under Robert Kraft's ownership, and the most losses under Bill Belichick, and their most losses since 1992. Also, the loss meant that the Patriots would finish last in the AFC East for the first time since 2000.

==== Week 18: vs. New York Jets ====
Week 18: New York Jets at New England Patriots – Game summary

Quarter	1	2	3	4	Total
**Jets**	3	3	0	11	**17**
Patriots	0	3	0	0	**3**

at Gillette Stadium, Foxborough, Massachusetts

- Date: January 7
- Game time: 1:00 p.m. EST
- Game weather: Snow, 33 °F (1 °C)
- Game attendance: 64,628
- Referee: Land Clark
- TV announcers (Fox): Chris Myers, Robert Smith and Jen Hale
- Recap, Game Book

Game information

**First quarter**

- NYJ – Greg Zuerlein 21-yard field goal, 2:04. Jets 3–0. **Drive: 10 plays, 35 yards, 5:16.**

**Second quarter**

- NE – Chad Ryland 30-yard field goal, 9:32. Tied 3–3. **Drive: 10 plays, 50 yards, 5:09.**
- NYJ – Greg Zuerlein 40-yard field goal, 6:07. Jets 6–3. **Drive: 8 plays, 56 yards, 3:25.**

**Third quarter**

- No scoring plays.

**Fourth quarter**

- NYJ – Greg Zuerlein 33-yard field goal, 8:08. Jets 9–3. **Drive: 8 plays, 30 yards, 4:09.**
- NYJ – Breece Hall 50-yard run (Breece Hall run), 1:47. Jets 17–3. **Drive: 2 plays, 53 yards, 0:16.**

**Top passers**

- NYJ – Trevor Siemian – 8/20, 70 yards
- NE – Bailey Zappe – 12/30, 88 yards, 2 INT

**Top rushers**

- NYJ – Breece Hall – 37 rushes, 178 yards, TD
- NE – Ezekiel Elliott – 13 rushes, 54 yards

**Top receivers**

- NYJ – Garrett Wilson – 2 receptions, 34 yards
- NE – Ezekiel Elliott – 5 receptions, 27 yards

This was the Patriots' first loss to the Jets since 2015, and their first home loss to them since the 2010 playoffs. With this loss, they finished with the worst record in the AFC at 4-13, their worst overall record since 1992. This was also Bill Belichick's final game with New England, as he and the Patriots mutually agreed to part ways a couple of days afterwards.

== Standings ==
=== Division ===
AFC East
	W	L	T	PCT	DIV	CONF	PF	PA	STK
^{(2)} Buffalo Bills	11	6	0	.647	4–2	7–5	451	311	W5
^{(6)} Miami Dolphins	11	6	0	.647	4–2	7–5	496	391	L2
New York Jets	7	10	0	.412	2–4	4–8	268	355	W1
New England Patriots	4	13	0	.235	2–4	4–8	236	366	L2

=== Conference ===
AFC
#	Team	Division	W	L	T	PCT	DIV	CONF	SOS	SOV	STK
Division leaders
1	Baltimore Ravens	North	13	4	0	.765	3–3	8–4	.543	.529	L1
2 (Note: Buffalo claimed the No. 2 seed over Kansas City based on head-to-head victory.) (Note: Buffalo finished ahead of Miami in the AFC East based on head-to-head sweep.)	Buffalo Bills	East	11	6	0	.647	4–2	7–5	.471	.471	W5
3	Kansas City Chiefs	West	11	6	0	.647	4–2	9–3	.481	.428	W2
4	Houston Texans	South	10	7	0	.588	4–2	7–5	.474	.465	W2
Wild cards
5 (Note: Cleveland claimed the No. 5 seed over Miami based on conference record.)	Cleveland Browns	North	11	6	0	.647	3–3	8–4	.536	.513	L1
6	Miami Dolphins	East	11	6	0	.647	4–2	7–5	.450	.358	L2
7	Pittsburgh Steelers	North	10	7	0	.588	5–1	7–5	.540	.571	W3
Did not qualify for the postseason
8 (Note: Cincinnati finished ahead of Jacksonville based on head-to-head victory. Division tie break was initially used to eliminate Indianapolis (see below).)	Cincinnati Bengals	North	9	8	0	.529	1–5	4–8	.574	.536	W1
9 (Note: Jacksonville finished ahead of Indianapolis based on head-to-head sweep.)	Jacksonville Jaguars	South	9	8	0	.529	4–2	6–6	.533	.477	L1
10	Indianapolis Colts	South	9	8	0	.529	3–3	7–5	.491	.444	L1
11 (Note: Las Vegas finished ahead of Denver based on head-to-head sweep.)	Las Vegas Raiders	West	8	9	0	.471	4–2	6–6	.488	.426	W1
12	Denver Broncos	West	8	9	0	.471	3–3	5–7	.488	.485	L1
13	New York Jets	East	7	10	0	.412	2–4	4–8	.502	.454	W1
14	Tennessee Titans	South	6	11	0	.353	1–5	4–8	.522	.422	W1
15	Los Angeles Chargers	West	5	12	0	.294	1–5	3–9	.529	.388	L5
16	New England Patriots	East	4	13	0	.235	2–4	4–8	.522	.529	L2
Tiebreakers (Note: When breaking ties for three or more teams under the NFL's rules, they are first broken within divisions, then comparing only the highest ranked remaining team from each division.)
