= Serwanga =

Serwanga is a surname. Notable people with this surname include:

- Kato Serwanga (1976–2025), Ugandan professional American football cornerback
- Wasswa Serwanga (born 1976), Ugandan professional American football cornerback, identical twin of the above
