= Isaiah Bolden =

American football player (born 1999)

Profile
- Position: Cornerback

Personal information
- Born: December 16, 1999 (age 26); Tampa, Florida, U.S.
- Listed height: 6 ft 2 in (1.88 m)
- Listed weight: 205 lb (93 kg)

Career information
- High school: Wesley Chapel (Wesley Chapel, Florida)
- College: Florida State (2018–2019); Jackson State (2020–2022)
- NFL draft: 2023: 7th round, 245th overall pick

Career history
- New England Patriots (2023–2024); San Francisco 49ers (2025)*; Louisville Kings (2026); Philadelphia Eagles (2026)*
- * Offseason or practice squad member only

Career NFL statistics as of 2024
- Total tackles: 10
- Fumble recoveries: 1
- Stats at Pro Football Reference

Isaiah Bolden (born December 16, 1999) is an American professional football cornerback. He played college football for the Florida State Seminoles before transferring to the Jackson State Tigers. He was selected by the New England Patriots in the seventh round of the 2023 NFL draft.

== Professional career ==
Pre-draft measurables
Height	Weight	Arm length	Hand span	Wingspan	40-yard dash	10-yard split	20-yard split	20-yard shuttle	Vertical jump	Broad jump
6 ft 2 1/8 in (1.88 m)	203 lb (92 kg)	32 3/4 in (0.83 m)	8 3/4 in (0.22 m)	6 ft 4 in (1.93 m)	4.35 s	1.54 s	2.59 s	4.63 s	38.0 in (0.97 m)	10 ft 9 in (3.28 m)
All values from Pro Day

=== New England Patriots ===
Bolden was selected by the New England Patriots in the seventh round with the 245th overall pick in the 2023 NFL draft. On May 13, 2023, Bolden signed his rookie deal with the Patriots. The deal was reportedly a four-year, $3,921,684 deal.

During the Patriots-Packers Week 2 preseason game, Bolden suffered an injury after colliding with teammate Calvin Munson after trying to tackle Packers player Malik Heath, which left him temporarily immobilized. The New England Patriots released a statement that says Bolden "had feeling in all his extremities, but has been taken to a local hospital for further tests and observation." The game was later suspended, and Bolden was taken to a nearby hospital for evaluation. This was the first game to be suspended since the prior season's Buffalo Bills–Cincinnati Bengals Week 17 game after Damar Hamlin's in-game collapse. The Patriots published a statement the next day reporting that he had been released from the hospital. He was placed on season-ending injured reserve on August 29, 2023.

Bolden was waived by the Patriots on August 28, 2024, and re-signed to the practice squad. On September 28, he was promoted to the active roster.

On August 22, 2025, Bolden was released by the Patriots.

=== San Francisco 49ers ===
On December 10, 2025, Bolden signed with the San Francisco 49ers' practice squad. He was released by the 49ers on December 16.

=== Louisville Kings ===
On January 14, 2026, Bolden was selected by the Louisville Kings of the United Football League (UFL).

=== Philadelphia Eagles ===
On August 17, 2026, Bolden signed with the Philadelphia Eagles. He was waived by the Eagles as a part of final roster cuts on August 30.
