= Marv Grim =

American football coach

Biographical details
- Born: c. 1941

Playing career

Football
- 1961: Bakersfield
- 1962–1963: Sacramento State
- Positions: Defensive back, running back

Coaching career (HC unless noted)

Football
- 1965–1969: Jesuit HS (CA)
- 1970–1975: Cerritos (assistant)
- 1976–1989: Hartnell

Golf
- 1970–1976: Cerritos

Administrative career (AD unless noted)
- 1989–2002: Hartnell

Head coaching record
- Overall: 107–35–4 (junior college football); 21–15 (high school football)
- Bowls: 4–3 (junior college)
- Tournaments: Football; 3–0 (California state JC Division II playoffs)

Accomplishments and honors

Championships
- Football; 7 Coast Conference (1980–1984, 1987, 1989)

Marvin Grim (born c. 1941) is an American former football coach and college athletics administrator. He served as the head football coach at Hartnell College in Salinas, California, from 1976 to 1989. Grim was the athletic director at Hartnell from 1989 to 2002.

Grim graduated from Grandview High School in Grandview, Washington. He attended Bakersfield College in Bakersfield, California, where played football as a defensive back. Grim then played at Sacramento State College—now known as California State University, Sacramento—as a running back. Grim carried the ball 110 times for 557 yards for the 1963 Sacramento State Hornets football team and was third in rushing yards in the Far Western Conference.

Grim began his coaching career at Jesuit High School in Carmichael, California. From 1970 to 1976, he coached at Cerritos College in Norwalk, California, as an assistant in football and head coach in golf.

Grim was inducted into the California Community College Football Coaches Association Hall of Fame in 1999. He retired in 2002.

== Head coaching record ==
=== Junior college football ===
Year	Team	Overall	Conference	Standing	Bowl/playoffs
Hartnell Panthers (Coast Conference) (1972–1985)
1976	Hartnell	4–5–1	3–2	T–2nd	
1977	Hartnell	4–6	3–2	T–2nd	
1978	Hartnell	9–1	4–1	2nd	
1979	Hartnell	7–3	3–2	3rd	
1980	Hartnell	8–1–2	4–0–1	1st	W California state junior college Division II championship
1981	Hartnell	10–1	6–0	1st	W Northern California junior college Division II championship
1982	Hartnell	9–1	5–0	1st	W Santa Cruz Lions Bowl
1983	Hartnell	10–1	6–0	1st	W Santa Cruz Lions Bowl
1984	Hartnell	8–3	6–0	1st	L Santa Cruz Lions Bowl
1985	Hartnell	8–1–1	4–1–1	2nd	L Santa Cruz Lions Bowl
1986	Hartnell	5–5	3–3	4th	
1987	Hartnell	8–3	5–1	T–1st	W Santa Cruz Lions Bowl
1988	Hartnell	9–2	4–2	T–2nd	W Santa Cruz Lions Bowl
1989	Hartnell	8–2	5–1	1st	L Santa Cruz Lions Bowl
Hartnell:		107–35–4	61–15–2		
Total:		107–35–4			
National championship Conference title Conference division title or championship game berth
