= Sacramento High School =

Sacramento Charter High School

Location
- 2315 34th Street; Sacramento, California 95817; United States; 38.5566°N 121.4589°W

Information
- Type: Independent Public Charter
- Motto: Service for Others
- Founded: 1856
- School district: Sacramento City Unified School District
- Chief of Schools: Kari Wehrly
- Grades: 9–12
- Gender: Coeducational
- Enrollment: 430 (2024-25)
- Campus type: Urban
- Colors: Purple and White
- Mascot: Dragon
- Website: https://www.sachigh.org/

Sacramento Charter High School ("Sac High") is an independent public charter high school in the Oak Park neighborhood of Sacramento, California. Originally founded in 1856, Sacramento High is the second oldest public high school in California and the second oldest west of the Mississippi River. The school served as a traditional public institution for over 145 years before being decommissioned in 2003 due to low performance. It reopened in September 2003 as an independent charter school governed by St. Hope Public Schools. As of 2024–25, the school has an enrollment of approximately 430 students.

== History ==
=== Founding and Early Years (1856–1920s) ===
Sacramento High School was founded in 1856 as a secondary educational institution to serve the growing Sacramento region. As one of the earliest secondary educational institutions established in California during the mid-19th century, the school became the second oldest public high school in California and the second oldest west of the Mississippi River. The school's original location reflected Sacramento's role as the state capital and a growing commercial hub, serving the city's educational needs during its formative years. During the late 19th and early 20th centuries, Sacramento High School expanded to serve the city's growing population. In response to increasing enrollment and the need for improved facilities, the Sacramento City Unified School District approved construction of a new campus. In 1922, construction began on the school's current location at 34th and Y Streets, and the school opened at this location in 1924 with modern facilities designed to accommodate the expanding student body.

=== Growth and Expansion (1924–2002) ===
From 1924 onward, Sacramento High School became a cornerstone institution in Sacramento's educational landscape. The school continuously expanded its service area to include the growing neighborhoods of Downtown Sacramento, Midtown, East Sacramento, River Park, College Greens, Tahoe Park, and Oak Park. By the late 20th century, the school had reached peak enrollment, making it one of the largest high schools in the Sacramento area. In 1976, the school underwent a significant campus renovation to meet modern earthquake safety standards. The renovation preserved the school's iconic architectural features, including two-story brick buildings and the distinctive clock tower that became a recognizable landmark in the Oak Park neighborhood. These upgrades ensured the campus could safely serve the large student population while maintaining the school's historical character. During this period of growth, Sacramento High School became known for its comprehensive academic programs and its significant role in serving Sacramento's diverse communities. The school's Visual and Performing Arts Center (VAPAC) became a notable feature, offering opportunities in music, theater, and visual arts to students from throughout the school's service area.

=== Decommissioning and Charter Conversion (2003–present) ===
In June 2003, the Sacramento City Unified School District (SCUSD) School Board voted to decommission Sacramento High School as a standard public school due to low academic performance and declining enrollment trends that had emerged in the late 1990s. The decision was controversial, drawing objections from students, parents, and teachers who valued the school's historical significance and community role. The decommissioning marked the end of nearly 150 years of continuous operation as a traditional public high school. Following the decommissioning, Sacramento High School reopened in September 2003 as an independent public charter school, maintaining many of its traditions. The new charter school retained the school colors of purple and white and kept the dragon as its mascot, though the Visual and Performing Arts Center (VAPAC), which had been a valued feature of the school for many years, was not continued under the charter model. The charter school is governed by a private Board of Directors from St. Hope Public Schools, a Sacramento-based nonprofit organization founded in 1990. St. Hope's mission focuses on education and community development in underserved neighborhoods. Under St. Hope's governance, Sacramento Charter High School operates with a renewed focus on serving the local Oak Park community and surrounding areas. The transition to charter status resulted in significant changes to the school's enrollment and operations. The current enrollment of approximately 430 students (2024–25) represents a substantial decline from the peak of 4,000 students in previous decades. The school now operates under the motto "Service for Others," reflecting both its historical values and St. Hope's community-focused mission.

== School Identity ==
Sacramento Charter High School maintains several distinctive identity elements that reflect both its long institutional history and its modern mission as a community-focused charter school.

=== School Colors and Mascot ===
The school's official colors are purple and white, which have been central to Sacramento High School's identity throughout its institutional history. The dragon serves as the school's mascot, a symbol that has represented the institution through its transitions from a traditional public high school to its current charter status. When the school reopened as a charter in 2003, it deliberately retained these traditional symbols despite significant organizational changes, preserving continuity with its historical identity.

=== Motto and Mission ===
The school operates under the motto "Service for Others," which reflects both its historical values and the mission of St. Hope Public Schools. This motto emphasizes Sacramento Charter High School's commitment to community service and its focus on serving underserved neighborhoods in the Sacramento region. The values represented by this motto guide the school's educational approach and its role within the Oak Park community.

== Governance and Administration ==
Sacramento Charter High School is governed by St. Hope Public Schools, a Sacramento-based nonprofit organization founded in 1990. St. Hope's mission centers on education and community development, with a focus on serving underserved neighborhoods in the Sacramento region. The school is governed by a private Board of Directors from St. Hope Public Schools and operates as an independent public charter school within the Sacramento City Unified School District. The school's Chief of Schools is Kari Wehrly. While the charter school operates independently in governance and curriculum decisions, it remains accountable to SCUSD and the state of California for academic performance and compliance standards.

== Notable alumni ==
- Michael James Adams – aviator and NASA astronaut
- Herb Caen – former gossip columnist for The X-Ray; went on to become Pulitzer Prize-winning columnist for the San Francisco Chronicle
- Eugene Chappie – Congressman 1981–1987
- Ray Eames – American artist, designer, architect and filmmaker
- Mitsuye Endo – American internment camp survivor and activist, who fought legally for the freedom of Japanese Americans during WW2. Won her case in the Supreme Court December 1944.
- Ernesto Galarza – author, labor organizer and activist
- Hiram Johnson – former California governor
- Kevin Johnson – former NBA player and Sacramento mayor
- Alva Johnston – author and Pulitzer Prize-winning writer for The New York Times
- Tim Kelly – President of the Alaska Senate 1989–1991
- Carlton E. Morse – writer
- Mozzy – Rapper
- Aaron Peckham – founder of Urban Dictionary
- Rufus Reid – jazz bassist, educator, and composer
- Cynthia Robinson – Rock and Roll Hall of Fame inductee, trumpeter and vocalist in Sly and The Family Stone

== Notable athletes ==
- Cuno Barragan – former MLB catcher
- Jim Breech – 14-year kicker for the Oakland Raiders and Cincinnati Bengals
- Ralph DeLoach – NFL player
- Brick Eldred – member of the Pacific Coast League Hall of Fame
- Kevin Galloway – professional basketball player
- Tommy Glaviano – former MLB infielder
- Stan Hack – 16-year MLB third baseman
- Drungo Hazewood – former MLB outfielder
- Woodie Held – 12-year MLB outfielder
- Myril Hoag – 13-year MLB outfielder
- Mike Howard – former MLB outfielder
- Kevin Johnson – former NBA player and Sacramento mayor
- Gordon Jones – 11-year MLB pitcher
- Tommy Kono – three-time medalist in weightlifting
- John McNamara – former minor-league catcher and major-league manager
- Jerry Royster – former MLB third baseman for five teams and current manager of the Lotte Giants, the Busan professional baseball team in South Korea
- Kato Serwanga – five-year defensive back with the New England Patriots, Washington Redskins and the New York Giants
- Wasswa Serwanga – three-year defensive back with the San Francisco 49ers and Minnesota Vikings
- Greg Sims – former MLB outfielder
- Chase Tapley – professional basketball player
- Matt Walbeck – Texas Rangers third-base coach and 11-year MLB catcher
