= Dan Chamberlain =

American football player (born 1937)

No. 84, 85
- Positions: End, halfback

Personal information
- Born: August 26, 1937 (age 89); Grand Rapids, Michigan, U.S.
- Listed height: 6 ft 3 in (1.91 m)
- Listed weight: 200 lb (91 kg)

Career information
- High school: El Dorado (Placerville, California)
- College: Sacramento State
- NFL draft: 1959: 25th round, 293rd overall pick

Career history
- Philadelphia Eagles (1959)*; Detroit Lions (1960)*; Buffalo Bills (1960–1961)
- * Offseason or practice squad member only

Career AFL statistics
- Receptions: 18
- Receiving yards: 295
- Touchdowns: 4
- Stats at Pro Football Reference

Daniel Chamberlain (born August 26, 1937) is an American former professional football player who was an end with the Buffalo Bills of the American Football League (AFL). He played college football for the Sacramento State Hornets.
