= Sacramento State Hornets football =

American football team of California State University, Sacramento

2026 Sacramento State Hornets football team
- First season: 1954; 72 years ago
- Athletic director: Mark Orr
- Head coach: Alonzo Carter; 1st season, 1–5 (.167)
- Location: Sacramento, California
- Stadium: Hornet Stadium (capacity: 21,195)
- NCAA division: FBS
- Conference: MAC
- Colors: Green and gold
- All-time record: 330–415–8 (.444)
- Bowl record: 0–2 (.000)

Conference championships
- FWC: 1964, 1966 WFC: 1986 AWC: 1995 Big Sky: 2019, 2021, 2022
- Rivalries: UC Davis (rivalry)
- Fight song: Fight, Hornet, Fight!
- Mascot: Herky the Hornet
- Marching band: Sacramento State Marching Band
- Website: hornetsports.com

The Sacramento State Hornets football program is the intercollegiate American football team for the California State University, Sacramento, located in Sacramento, California. The team competes in the NCAA Division I Football Bowl Subdivision and are currently members of the Mid-American Conference.

The school's first football team was fielded in 1954. The team plays its home games at the 21,195-seat Hornet Stadium. The Sacramento State Hornets football team drew an average home attendance of 13,348 in 2023.

Beginning in the 2026–27 school year, Sacramento State will become a full member of the Big West Conference, a conference that does not sponsor football. The Hornets agreed to a five-year membership with the Mid-American Conference as a football-only member, allowing the team to transition to the Football Bowl Subdivision (FBS) beginning July 1, 2026.

== History ==
In 1954, Dave Strong was named the first football coach for the Hornets football program. The program's first victory came in their second season, in 1955, when the Hornets defeated Southern Oregon by a point. Sacramento State was first affiliated with the Northern California Athletic Conference, from 1954 through 1984; the conference was known as the Far Western Conference until 1982. The Hornets were then members of the Western Football Conference from 1985 through 1992. In 1993, Sacramento State move the American West Conference, and then to the Big Sky Conference in 1996. Hornet Stadium has been home to the football team since 1969.

=== Past success and notable games ===
The Hornets have participated in two bowl games, the Pasadena Bowl in 1968 against Grambling State, where the Hornets lost, 34–7, and the Camellia Bowl in 1964, where Montana State defeated the Hornets, 28–7.

One of Sac State's most notable wins came on September 3, 2011, in the season opener against the Oregon State Beavers of the Pac-12 Conference at Reser Stadium. The Hornets upset the Beavers in overtime, 29–28 with a two-point conversion pass from quarterback Jeff Flemming to wide receiver Brandyn Reed, beating an AQ conference team for the first time in school history in front of an announced crowd of 41,581. The Beavers were a 23-point favorite coming into the game. Four weeks after the win over Oregon State, the Hornets defeated FCS national power Montana, the program's first win ever over the Grizzlies, on September 24, 2011. Hornets defeated the then No. 10 ranked Grizzlies by a score of 42–28 in Hornet Stadium.

On September 8, 2012, Sac State defeated Colorado Buffaloes of the Pac-12 conference, at Folsom Field as 20-point underdogs. Colorado jumped to an early 14–0 start but the Hornets quickly answered back with a pair of touchdown passes from Hornets quarterback Garrett Safron and a 2-yard rushing touchdown by A.J. Ellis to lead 21–14 over the Buffaloes. Sac State led 24–21 during intermission. With less than a minute left in the fourth quarter and down 28–27, Hornet's walk-on kicker, Edgar Castenada, made the 31-yard field goal winning kick for a final score of 30–28. After the game, Hornets head coach Marshall Sperbeck announced in the locker room that Sacramento State has offered Castendada a scholarship. This marked a consecutive year in which Sac State faced an AQ conference school (both in the Pac-12 conference) as heavy underdogs on the road and walked out with victories.

The Sacramento State football team were ranked for the first time ever in school history at the end of the 2019 season when they placed No. 3 nationally in both the STATS and the Coaches polls. Sacramento State was also ranked as the No. 4 team in the 2019 NCAA Division I FCS playoff bracket, receiving a first-week bye in their road to the finals. The 2019 season was a major milestone in the teams' history as the season brought Sacramento State its first-ever Big Sky Conference Championship, its fifth conference title overall, and its first-ever appearance in the FCS playoffs. Prior to the 2019 season, Sacramento State was never ranked at the end of any season but had won four conference titles.

The Sacramento State football team would set numerous school records for the 2022 season. On September 24, 2022, the Hornets defeated Colorado State 41–10 at Canvas Stadium, making this their largest victory by margin over an FBS team. The 2022 team went on to go undefeated in the regular season for the first time in school history, finishing 11–0, alongside setting a record for most wins in a season at 12. The team also achieved the highest rankings in the major FCS polls, reaching as high as No. 2 in both the STATS and the Coaches Polls. They would set a school record for highest attendance for a football game, winning the Causeway Classic over UC Davis 27–21 in their regular season home finale with an official crowd of 23,073. They also clinched their first FCS playoff victory over Richmond in the NCAA Division I Second Round.

=== Classification history ===
- 1954–1955: No classification
- 1956–1972: NCAA College Division
- 1973–1992: NCAA Division II
- 1993–2026: NCAA Division I-AA
- 2026–future: NCAA Division I FBS

== Conference affiliations ==
- Far Western Conference (1954–1982)
- Northern California Athletic Conference (1983–1984)
- Western Football Conference (1985–1992)
- American West Conference (1993–1995)
- Big Sky Conference (1996–2025)
- Mid-American Conference (2026–present)

== Championships ==
=== Conference championships ===
Year	Coach	Conference	Overall record	Conference record
1964	Ray Clemons	Far Western Conference	8–2–1	4–0–1
1966	Ray Clemons	Far Western Conference	8–2	6–0
1986	Bob Mattos	Western Football Conference	6–4–1	5–1
1995	John Volek	American West Conference	4–6–1	3–0
2019	Troy Taylor	Big Sky Conference	9–4	7–1
2021	Troy Taylor	Big Sky Conference	9–3	8–0
2022	Troy Taylor	Big Sky Conference	12–1	8–0

== Postseason results ==
=== Division II playoffs ===
The Hornets made one appearance in the Division II Playoffs. Their record was 2–1.

Year	Round	Opponent	Result
1988	First Round; Quarterfinals; Semifinals	UC Davis; North Carolina Central; North Dakota State	W, 35–14; W, 56–7; L, 20–42

=== Division I FCS playoffs ===
The Hornets have made four appearances in the FCS Playoffs, with a combined record of 2–4.

Year	Round	Opponent	Result
2019	Second Round	Austin Peay	L, 28–42
2021	Second Round	South Dakota State	L, 19–24
2022	Second Round; Quarterfinals	Richmond; Incarnate Word	W, 38–31; L, 63–66
2023	First Round; Second Round	North Dakota; South Dakota	W, 42–35; L, 24–34

=== Bowl games ===
Season	Bowl	Opponent	Result
1964	Camellia Bowl	Montana State	L, 7–28
1968	Pasadena Bowl	Grambling State	L, 7–34

== Home stadiums ==
- 1955–1958

Grant Stadium - Sacramento, CA
Capacity (8,000)

- 1954, 1959–1968

Hughes Stadium - East Sacramento, CA
Capacity (20,311)

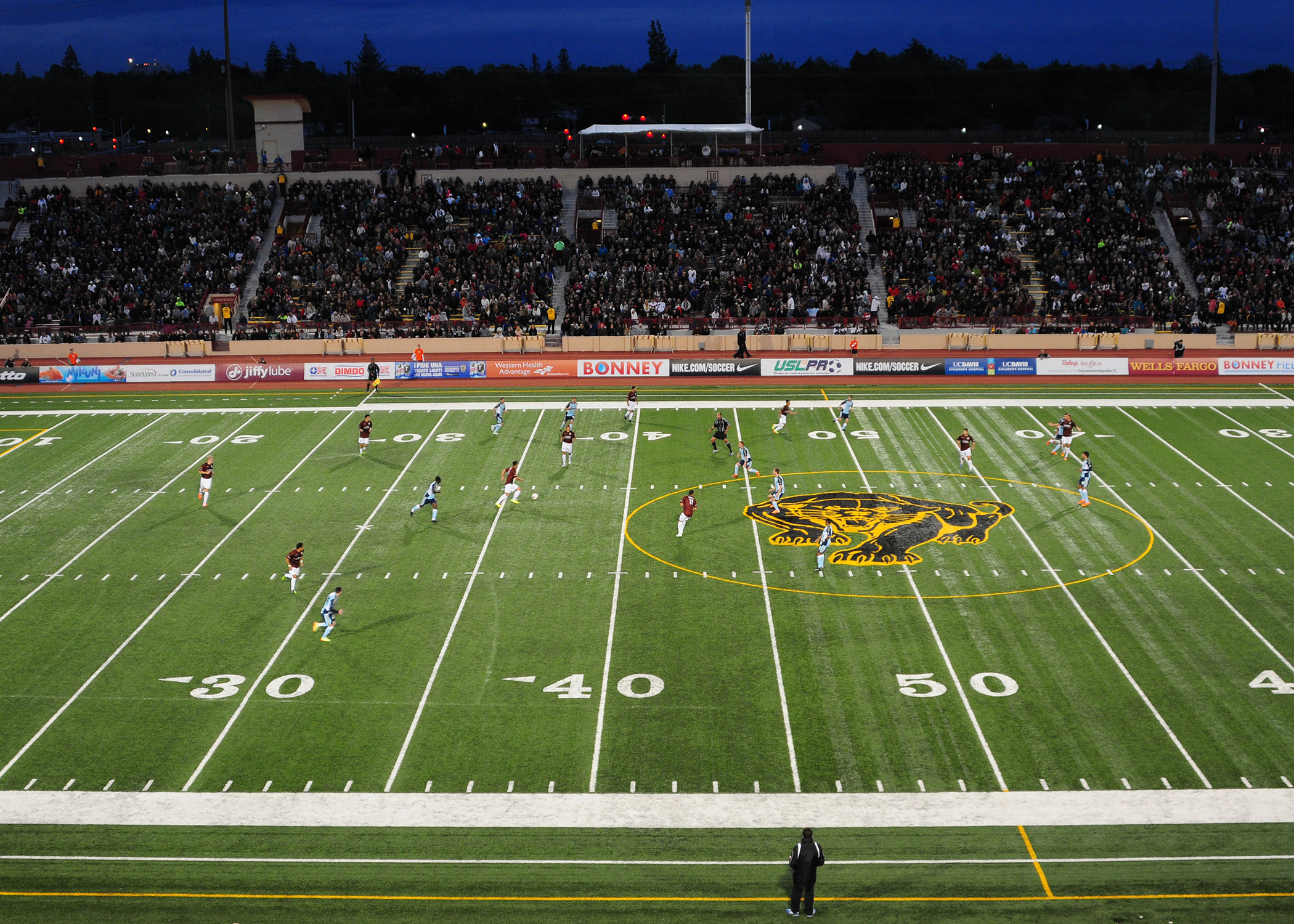
Charles C. Hughes Stadium

Charles C. Hughes Stadium (commonly referred to as Hughes Stadium) is an outdoor stadium located at Sacramento City College. The stadium opened in 1928 and was initially known as Sacramento Stadium and Sacramento College Stadium.

It was renamed in November 1944 in honor of Charles Colfax Hughes, the first superintendent of the Sacramento City Unified School District, who died a month earlier.

In 2012, the stadium underwent a major overhaul, installing an artificial turf field surface, a new track surface, and a major refurbishment of the facilities documented in this video. Its present seating capacity is 20,311.

- 1967–1968

Hornet Field - Sacramento State Campus

Hornet Field was a multi-purpose on-campus field used for football, baseball and other sports. For the 1967–68 Sacramento State Hornets football seasons, the football team split its home football games between Hornet Field and Charles C. Hughes Stadium.

- 1969–current

Fred Anderson Field at Hornet Stadium - Sacramento State Campus
Capacity (21,195)

Fred Anderson Field at Hornet Stadium is a 21,195-seat college football and track stadium on the campus of California State University, Sacramento (Sacramento State). It opened 57 years ago on September 20, 1969, it has also been the home stadium of the Sacramento Surge of the WLAF, the Sacramento Gold Miners of the Canadian Football League and the Sacramento Mountain Lions of the United Football League. It hosted the U.S. Olympic Trials for track and field in 2000 and 2004.

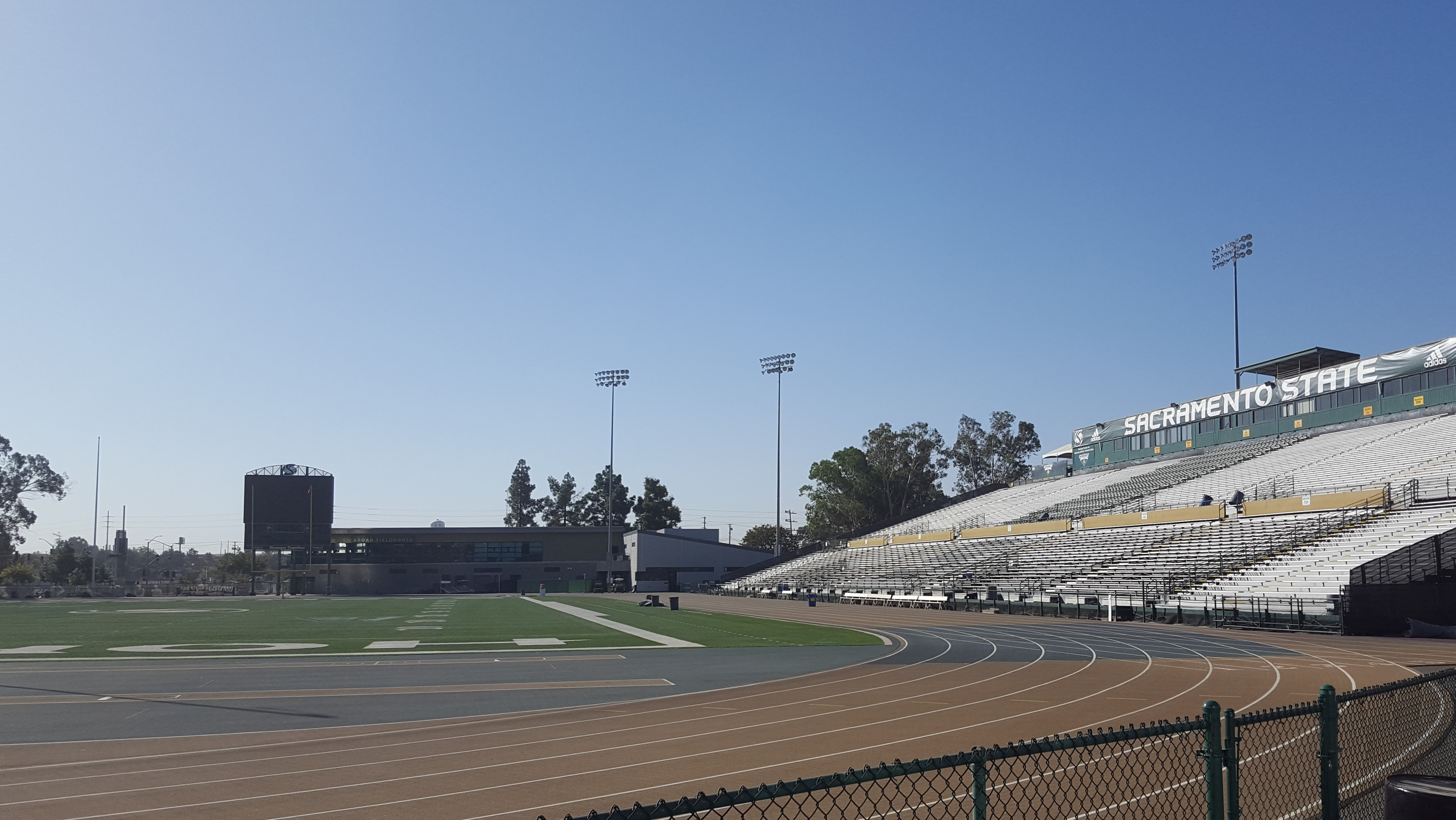
Fred Anderson Field at Hornet Stadium – Home grandstand

Its alignment is nearly north-south, offset slightly northwest, and the street-level elevation is approximately 35 feet (11 m) above sea level. The field was natural grass for its first 41 seasons; FieldTurf was installed in 2010.

In 1998, Permanent chairbacks were installed in Section 213 at the 50–yard line. In 2000 The stadium underwent a $1 million improvement in preparation for the U.S. Track and Field Olympic Trials; An Olympic–sized track was installed surrounding the field as well as a practice track north of the stadium. In 2003 New scoreboard installed. In 2007 new public entrances were installed. IN 2008 Broad Fieldhouse opened, which included new offices, locker rooms, athletic training room, weight room and a VIP patio. In 2010 natural grass was replaced by FieldTurf Duraspine Pro, "The Well" opened next to the north end zone which provided paved areas for concessions and a Jumbotron was added below the scoreboard.

On July 17, 1993, it was the site of the first regular season Canadian Football League (CFL) game played on American soil involving an American based team, where the Calgary Stampeders defeated the Gold Miners 38–36. Fred Anderson Field also hosted the largest crowd ever to witness an event at Fred Anderson Field was when the Sacramento Surge defeated the Barcelona Dragons in the World League playoffs on May 30, 1992 in front of 26,445 fans.

The largest Sacramento State football crowd occurred on November 19, 2022 when 23,073 fans saw the Hornets complete an 11–0 regular season with a 27–21 victory over UC Davis in the Causeway Classic.

== Rivalries ==
=== UC Davis ===
The Hornets plays the rival UC Davis Aggies, annually and usually the last game of the regular season. This rivalry game is known as The Causeway Classic, and each team competes for the Causeway Trophy, referring to the fact that the schools are connected by the long Yolo Causeway bridge over Yolo Bypass flood way. UC Davis leads the series 46–23. This game has drawn crowds up to 23,000 in the Hornet Stadium, and is widely popular in the local area.

=== Cal Poly (Green and Gold Rivalry) ===
While not commemorated with a trophy, Cal Poly and Sacramento State are designated as 'protected rivals' in scheduling by the Big Sky Conference, meaning they are guaranteed to play each other in foreseeable schedules. From 1967 to 2024, the Mustangs and Hornets have met 43 times, Cal Poly leads the series, 22–21.

Other notable rivalries includes Portland State, Eastern Washington University, Weber State, the Montana schools, Montana, Montana State and Big Sky conference foes. Also, regional rival Pacific before they discontinued their football program in 1995.

== Head coaches ==
Coach	Tenure	Record	Pct.
Dave Strong	1954–1956	4–18–1	.196
Johnny Baker	1957–1960	15–22	.405
Ray Clemons	1961–1975	70–76–3	.480
Glenn Brady	1976–1977	2–18–1	.119
Bob Mattos	1978–1992	84–73–2	.535
Mike Clemons	1993–1994	9–11	.450
John Volek	1995–2002	31–57–1	.354
Steve Mooshagian	2003–2006	11–33	.250
Marshall Sperbeck	2007–2013	35–44	.443
Jody Sears	2014–2018	20–35	.364
Troy Taylor	2019–2022	30–8	.811
Andy Thompson	2023–2024	11–14	.440
Brennan Marion	2025	7–5	.583
Alonzo Carter	2026–present	0–0	–

== College Football Hall of Fame ==
College Football Hall of Fame
Name	Position	Year	Inducted	Ref
Ken O'Brien	QB	1978	1997	

== National Award winners ==
- Eddie Robinson Award

Eddie Robinson Award
Year	Name	Position
2019	Troy Taylor	Coach

The Eddie Robinson Award is awarded annually to college football's top head coach in the NCAA Division I Football Championship Subdivision (formerly Division I-AA). It was established in 1987.

== Past Hornets in the NFL ==
- Brian Allred, Seattle Seahawks (1993)
- Otis Amey, San Francisco 49ers (2005)
- McLeod Bethel-Thompson, Minnesota Vikings & San Francisco 49ers (2011–2016)
- Mike Black, Philadelphia Eagles, & New York Giants (1986–1987)
- DaRon Bland, Dallas Cowboys (2022–present)
- DeAndre Carter, Chicago Bears (2015–present)
- Mike Carter, Green Bay Packers (1970, 1972)
- Dan Chamberlain, Buffalo Bills (1960–1961)
- Tony Corbin, San Diego Chargers (1997)
- Todd Davis, New Orleans Saints & Denver Broncos (2014–2021)
- Elijah Dotson, Los Angeles Chargers (2023)
- John Farley, Cincinnati Bengals (1984)
- John Gesek, Los Angeles Raiders (1987–1995)
- Rob Harrison, Los Angeles Raiders (1987)
- Angelo James, Philadelphia Eagles (1987)
- P. J. Johnson, Detroit Lions (2019)
- Jon Kirksey, New Orleans Saints & St. Louis Rams (1996)
- Lorenzo Lynch, Chicago Bears (1987–1997)
- Marte Mapu, New England Patriots & Houston Texans (2023–present)
- Zack Nash, Arizona Cardinals (2012)
- Ken O'Brien, New York Jets & Philadelphia Eagles (1984–1993)
- Lonie Paxton, New England Patriots & Denver Broncos (2000–2011)
- Greg Robinson, Tampa Bay Buccaneers & New England Patriots (1986–1987)
- Darnell Sankey, Indianapolis Colts (2017)
- Kato Serwanga, New England Patriots (1998–2003)
- Wasswa Serwanga, San Francisco 49ers (1999–2001)
- Daimon Shelton, Jacksonville Jaguars (1997–2006)
- Cam Skattebo, New York Giants (2025–present)
- Jackson Slater, Tennessee Titans (2025–present)
- Bob Wear, Philadelphia Eagles (1941)

== Notable former players ==
Notable alumni include:

- Clancy Barone
- DaRon Bland
- DeAndre Carter
- Ryan Coogler
- Todd Davis
- Elijah Dotson
- Aaron Garcia
- John Gesek
- Marv Grim
- P. J. Johnson
- Lorenzo Lynch
- Marte Mapu
- Ricky Ray
- Charles Roberts
- Daimon Shelton
- Cameron Skattebo
- Jackson Slater
- Elijah Tau-Tolliver
- Zelmar Vedder

== Future non-conference opponents ==
Announced schedules as of October 2, 2026.

The MAC plays 8 conference games, which leaves 4 games for non-conference opponents.

Hawaii announced they will host Sacramento State on November 28, 2026.

Sacramento State and San Jose State announced a six-game series, with each team hosting three contests.

2026	2027	2028	2029	2030	2032	2034	2035	2036
Mississippi Valley State	at California	at Oregon	at Oregon State	at San Jose State	at San Jose State	San Jose State	at San Jose State	San Jose State
at Fresno State	at North Dakota State		Southern Utah					
North Dakota State	at Fresno State							
at Hawaii	San Jose State							
