= Jackson Slater =

American football player (born 2003)

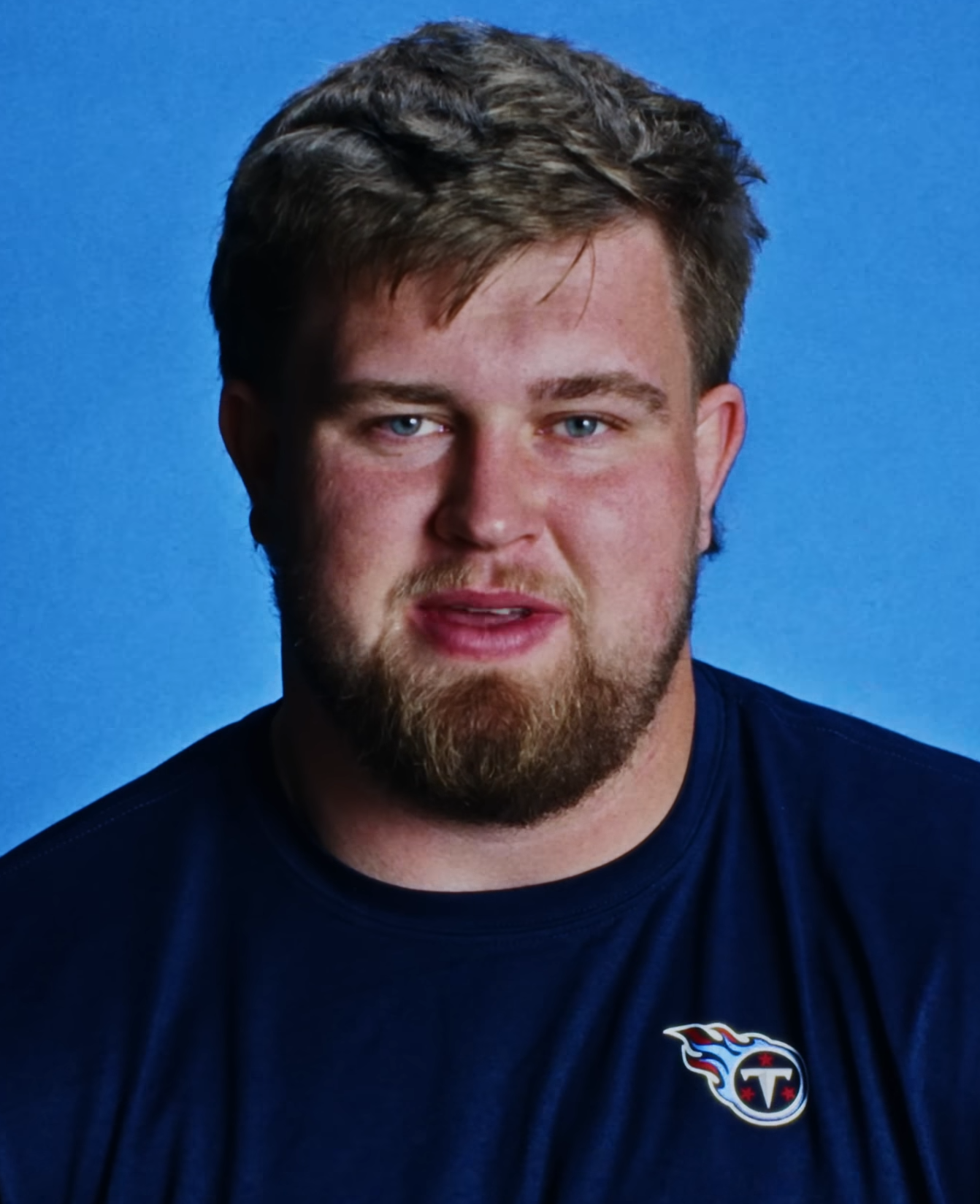
- Slater with the Tennessee Titans in 2025

No. 64 – Tennessee Titans
- Position: Guard
- Roster status: Injured reserve

Personal information
- Born: May 30, 2003 (age 23); Bellevue, Washington, U.S.
- Listed height: 6 ft 3 in (1.91 m)
- Listed weight: 320 lb (145 kg)

Career information
- High school: Newport (Bellevue)
- College: Sacramento State (2021–2024)
- NFL draft: 2025: 5th round, 167th overall pick

Career history
- Tennessee Titans (2025–present)

Awards and highlights
- 2× First-team FCS All-American (2022, 2024); 3× First-team All-Big Sky (2022, 2023, 2024)

Career NFL statistics as of 2025
- Games played: 12
- Stats at Pro Football Reference

Jackson Thomas Slater (born May 30, 2003) is an American professional football guard for the Tennessee Titans of the National Football League (NFL). He played college football for the Sacramento State Hornets and was selected by the Titans in the fifth round of the 2025 NFL draft.

== Early life ==
Slater attended Newport High School in Bellevue, Washington. Coming out of high school, he was rated as a three-star recruit and committed to play college football for the Sacramento State Hornets.

== College career ==
During Slater's collegiate career he appeared in 44 games, where he was named an all-Big Sky Conference selection and a FCS All-American Selection from 2022 through 2024. After the 2024 season, he declared for the 2025 NFL draft and accepted an invite to play in the 2025 Senior Bowl. Slater also accepted an invite to participate in the 2025 NFL scouting combine.

== Professional career ==
Pre-draft measurables
Height	Weight	Arm length	Hand span	Wingspan	40-yard dash	10-yard split	20-yard split	20-yard shuttle	Three-cone drill	Vertical jump	Broad jump	Bench press
6 ft 3 in (1.91 m)	311 lb (141 kg)	32 in (0.81 m)	10 in (0.25 m)	6 ft 6 1/2 in (1.99 m)	5.01 s	1.78 s	2.91 s	4.70 s	7.69 s	32.5 in (0.83 m)	9 ft 0 in (2.74 m)	31 reps
All values from NFL Combine/Pro Day

Slater was drafted by the Tennessee Titans with the 167th pick in the fifth round of the 2025 NFL draft. The Titans had acquired the pick from the Kansas City Chiefs in the trade for DeAndre Hopkins.
