= Mike Black (offensive lineman) =

American football player (born 1964)

No. 77, 64
- Position: Offensive tackle

Personal information
- Born: August 24, 1964 (age 62); Auburn, California, U.S.
- Listed height: 6 ft 4 in (1.93 m)
- Listed weight: 285 lb (129 kg)

Career information
- High school: Del Oro (Loomis, California)
- College: Sacramento State
- NFL draft: 1986: 9th round, 237th overall pick

Career history
- Seattle Seahawks (1986)*; Philadelphia Eagles (1986); New York Giants (1987)
- * Offseason or practice squad member only

Career NFL statistics
- Games played: 3
- Games started: 2
- Stats at Pro Football Reference

Michael David Black (born August 24, 1964) is an American former professional football player who was an offensive tackle in the National Football League (NFL) for the Philadelphia Eagles and the New York Giants. He played college football at California State University, Sacramento and was selected by the Seattle Seahawks in the ninth round of the 1986 NFL draft with the 237th overall pick.
