= Kato Serwanga =

Ugandan gridiron footballer (1976–2025)

No. 31, 22, 26
- Position: Cornerback

Personal information
- Born: July 23, 1976; Kampala, Uganda
- Died: September 25, 2025 (aged 49); Berkeley, California, U.S.
- Listed height: 6 ft 0 in (1.83 m)
- Listed weight: 205 lb (93 kg)

Career information
- High school: Sacramento (Sacramento, California, U.S.)
- College: Sacramento State (1994); Pacific (1995); California (1996–1997)
- NFL draft: 1998: undrafted

Career history
- New England Patriots (1998–2000); → Scottish Claymores (2001)*; Washington Redskins (2001–2002); New York Giants (2002–2003); Indianapolis Colts (2004)*
- * Offseason or practice squad member only

Career NFL statistics
- Tackles: 110
- Interceptions: 3
- Sacks: 3
- Stats at Pro Football Reference

Kato E. Serwanga (July 23, 1976 – September 25, 2025) was a Ugandan professional American football player who was a cornerback in the National Football League (NFL). After his family moved to the U.S. when he was three years old, he played college football for the Sacramento State Hornets, Pacific Tigers and California Golden Bears. He signed with the New England Patriots as an undrafted free agent in 1998 and played for them in the 1999 and 2000 seasons. He then played for the Washington Redskins from 2001 to 2002 and for the New York Giants from 2002 to 2003 before concluding his career as a member of the Indianapolis Colts in 2004. He was the twin brother of fellow NFL player Wasswa Serwanga.

== Life and career ==
=== Early life and education ===
Serwanga was born on July 23, 1976, in Kampala, Uganda. He has three brothers and two sisters, including a twin brother, Wasswa. He was born 15 minutes after his brother; his name, pronounced "Kah-TOE", means "younger twin". He moved to the United States with his family at age three. The decision came after three of Serwanga's uncles were killed under the regime of Idi Amin for being wealthy; his father Patrick sold his possessions in exchange for plane tickets to bring the family to the U.S. Patrick himself had nearly been killed by Amin's regime, surviving an attempted murder by jumping from his moving car. The family arrived in Sacramento, California, and Patrick attempted to wire for his money, but never received it.

Serwanga's father worked washing dishes to provide for the family, who lived in a small apartment with only two beds. Serwanga first tried out football at age nine, after watching his older brother James play sandlot football. He and his brother played football while attending Sacramento Charter High School, where they both were cornerbacks. In 1992, Wasswa was starting and Kato served as his backup. The twins were very competitive with each other. Following the 1993 season, both he and his brother were named All-Metro League. They both signed to play college football for the Sacramento State Hornets.

The twins both started at Sacramento State as freshmen in 1994 and Kato posted four interceptions that year. However, they both transferred to the Pacific Tigers following one season, when the school initially decided to drop football. They saw significant playing time with the Tigers in 1995, as both appeared in eight games (sitting out several due to transfer rules), with Kato totaling 33 unassisted tackles and four interceptions. His four interceptions lead the team. After the 1995 season, it was announced that Pacific was ending its football team due to financial issues. They had to transfer again, with Wasswa committing to the UCLA Bruins while Kato went to the California Golden Bears, the first time the twins were on separate teams.

Serwanga was a starter for the Golden Bears from 1996 to 1997, playing as a nickelback. The twins faced off against each other when UCLA played California, with the News-Pilot describing them as being a "mirror image" of each other, as both were the same height (5 feet 11 inches (1.80 m)) and weight (190 pounds (86 kg)). Kato led California and placed third in the Pac-12 Conference with four interceptions in 1996, helping the team to a 6–6 record and an appearance in the 1996 Aloha Bowl. He faced off against his brother for a second time in 1997. He posted one interception for California as a senior in 1997. At California, Serwanga was also used as a punt returner, finishing with 17 returns for 297 yards in his two years with the team.

=== Professional career ===
After going unselected in the 1998 NFL draft, Serwanga signed with the New England Patriots as an undrafted free agent. His brother signed with the Chicago Bears as an undrafted free agent. He performed well during preseason but was released at the final roster cuts on August 30, 1998, then re-signed to the practice squad the following day. On December 1, 1998, he was signed to the active roster, though he did not play in any games that season. In 1999, Serwanga made the team as a backup cornerback. He made his NFL debut in the team's Week 1 win against the New York Giants, posting a tackle, and ended up appearing in all 16 games for the Patriots in 1999. He and his brother became the first Ugandan-born NFL players in history, and remain among only three to do it. Serwanga posted his first interception in Week 8 against the Arizona Cardinals and served as a starter in the last three games of the season, posting two interceptions in those games. He finished the season with 50 tackles, one sack, two forced fumbles and three interceptions. Serwanga also had 15 pass breakups which placed second on the team, behind only Ty Law.

After competing for a starting role in training camp, Serwanga played as a backup and special teams player for the Patriots in 2000. Appearing in 15 games, he posted 32 tackles, two sacks, one forced fumble and two pass breakups. He was allocated to the Scottish Claymores of NFL Europe in February 2001, though he did not play in any games for them. He re-signed with the Patriots for the 2001 NFL season, though he was released prior to the season on September 2, 2001.

Serwanga signed with the Washington Redskins on October 16, 2001. A top special teams performer with Washington, he was awarded the game ball by coach Marty Schottenheimer after a win against the Cardinals in which he downed a punt at the one-yard line and had two important tackles. He appeared in a total of 11 games for the Redskins, tallying 10 tackles. He was placed on injured reserve to begin the 2002 season due to a knee injury, then released from injured reserve on November 28, 2002. Within a week of his release by the Redskins, he signed with the New York Giants and a few days later was thrust into their game against the Redskins due to injuries. With the team's playoff chances on the line, Serwanga made two crucial plays to help the Giants win 27–21, recovering a muffed punt and later forcing a fumble. He appeared in three regular season games for the Giants, totaling three tackles and a forced fumble, and also saw action in their one playoff game.

Serwanga returned to the Giants in 2003 as a backup. He played in 13 games and recorded 15 tackles. Serwanga became a free agent following the 2003 season. He signed with the Indianapolis Colts on August 31, 2004, but was released on September 5, ending his professional career. Serwanga appeared in a total of 58 NFL games, posting 110 tackles, three sacks, four forced fumbles and three interceptions.

=== Death ===
Serwanga died at the age of 49 on September 25, 2025, in Berkeley, California.

== See also ==
- Ugandan Americans
