= La'Michael Pettway =

American football player (born 1997)

Profile
- Position: Tight end

Personal information
- Born: March 20, 1997 (age 29)
- Listed height: 6 ft 2 in (1.88 m)
- Listed weight: 250 lb (113 kg)

Career information
- High school: Nashville (AR)
- College: Arkansas (2015–2018); Iowa State (2019)
- NFL draft: 2020: undrafted

Career history
- TSL Aviators (2021); Michigan Panthers (2022); Birmingham Stallions (2023); Indianapolis Colts (2023)*; New England Patriots (2023); Birmingham Stallions (2025)
- * Offseason or practice squad member only
- Stats at Pro Football Reference

La'Michael Pettway (born March 20, 1997) is an American professional football tight end. He played college football for the Arkansas Razorbacks and Iowa State Cyclones. After going unselected in the 2020 NFL draft, Pettway played for the Aviators of The Spring League (TSL) in 2021, then for the Michigan Panthers (2022) and Birmingham Stallions (2023) of the United States Football League (USFL), before signing his first NFL contract with the Indianapolis Colts in 2023.

== Early life ==
Pettway was born on March 20, 1997. He originally was from Alabama, moving to Arkansas in elementary school. He attended Nashville High School and played football, basketball and track and field. He entered his junior football season as his team's starting quarterback, completing 33-of-56 pass attempts for 342 yards and five touchdowns with 47 rushes for 263 yards and two additional scores in the first three games, before changing his focus to wide receiver and totaling 56 receptions for 1,056 yards and 15 touchdowns.

Pettway stayed at receiver as a senior and had 54 catches for 913 yards and 18 scores, along with 42 tackles and eight interceptions on defense, being named first-team All-Arkansas Preps by the Arkansas Democrat-Gazette while helping his school reach the state playoff quarterfinals. He was an all-state selection, the second time in his career, was chosen to the Associated Press' Arkansas Super Team and was a finalist for the Class 4A Offensive Player of the Year award. He had 123 catches for 2,151 yards and 34 touchdowns in his high school career. Ranked by most sources as a three-star prospect, although given four by ESPN, Pettway initially committed to play college football for the Ole Miss Rebels, then de-committed and re-signed to the Arkansas Razorbacks.

== College career ==
As a true freshman at Arkansas in 2015, Pettway redshirted. He had one catch for 10 yards in 10 games for Arkansas in 2016. He then appeared in nine games, three as a starter, for the Razorbacks in 2017, having six receptions for 92 yards. He started five games in 2018 and was the team's leading receiver with 30 catches, 499 yards and four touchdowns. He transferred to play for the Iowa State Cyclones for his final season in 2019, ending his stint at Arkansas with 37 receptions for 601 yards and five touchdowns. He was named an honorable mention All-Big 12 Conference selection in his only year at Iowa State while being the team's leading receiver with 55 catches for 676 yards and six touchdowns, with Pettway having started 10 of 13 games.

== Professional career ==
Pre-draft measurables
Height	Weight	Arm length	Hand span
6 ft 2 1/8 in (1.88 m)	221 lb (100 kg)	34 in (0.86 m)	9 1/4 in (0.23 m)
All values from Pro Day

=== Early career ===
Pettway was unselected in the 2020 NFL draft and played for the Aviators of The Spring League (TSL) in 2021. He had a workout with the New England Patriots before the 2022 season. Pettway was selected in the 2022 USFL draft by the Michigan Panthers. He played 10 games for the team with four starts and posted 24 catches for 307 yards and two scores. He then joined the Birmingham Stallions for the 2023 season and played in seven games with three starts, recording seven catches for 99 yards and two touchdowns as they won the league championship.

=== Indianapolis Colts ===
Pettway was signed by the Indianapolis Colts of the NFL on August 1, 2023. He suffered an undisclosed injury and was waived/injured on August 9, reverting to injured reserve two days later. He was removed from the team on August 17.

=== New England Patriots ===
Pettway was signed to the practice squad of the New England Patriots on December 27, 2023. He signed a two-year contract to the active roster on January 6, 2024, prior to the team's season finale against the New York Jets.

Pettway was released by the Patriots on August 26, 2024.

=== Birmingham Stallions (second stint) ===
On January 2, 2025, Pettway re-signed with the Birmingham Stallions of the United Football League (UFL).
