= John Gesek =

American football player (born 1963)

No. 63, 67, 75
- Positions: Guard, center

Personal information
- Born: February 18, 1963 (age 63); San Francisco, California, U.S.
- Listed height: 6 ft 5 in (1.96 m)
- Listed weight: 282 lb (128 kg)

Career information
- High school: San Ramon Valley (Danville, California)
- College: Sacramento State
- NFL draft: 1987: 10th round, 265th overall pick

Career history
- Los Angeles Raiders (1987–1989); Dallas Cowboys (1990–1993); Washington Redskins (1994–1995)

Awards and highlights
- 2× Super Bowl champion (XXVII, XXVIII); 2× All-WFC (1985, 1986)

Career NFL statistics
- Games played: 123
- Games started: 94
- Fumble recoveries: 3
- Stats at Pro Football Reference

John Christian Gesek Jr. (born February 18, 1963) is an American former professional football player who was an offensive lineman in the National Football League (NFL) for the Los Angeles Raiders, Dallas Cowboys, and Washington Redskins. He played college football for the Sacramento State Hornets and was selected in the 10th round of the 1987 NFL draft. Gesek won two Super Bowls with the Cowboys over the Buffalo Bills as a starting offensive lineman.

== Early life ==
Gesek attended San Ramon Valley High School, as a freshman and senior, transferring to Bellflower High School for his sophomore and junior seasons. He was a two-way player on the offensive and defensive line.

After graduation he moved on to Diablo Valley College where he did not participate in sports. As a sophomore, he transferred to Sacramento State University during its non-scholarship Division II years. He played defensive end, tallying 34 tackles and 4 sacks.

As a junior, he moved to offensive tackle and found a starting spot at right tackle. As a senior, he was the only returning starter on an offensive line that helped post 400.5 yards per game and won the Western Football Conference title.

In 1996, he was inducted into the Sacramento State Football Hall of Fame. The school also created the annual "John Gesek Outstanding Offensive Lineman Award" in his honor.

== Professional career ==
Pre-draft measurables
Height	Weight	Arm length	Hand span	40-yard dash	10-yard split	20-yard split	20-yard shuttle	Vertical jump	Broad jump	Bench press
6 ft 4 1/2 in (1.94 m)	274 lb (124 kg)	32 in (0.81 m)	9 3/4 in (0.25 m)	5.21 s	1.80 s	3.02 s	4.87 s	25.5 in (0.65 m)	8 ft 11 in (2.72 m)	23 reps
All values from NFL Combine

=== Los Angeles Raiders ===
Gesek was selected by the Los Angeles Raiders in the 10th round (265th overall) of the 1987 NFL draft. As a rookie, he appeared in 3 games (one start), before being placed on the injured reserve list on September 7 with a knee injury.

The next season after Charley Hannah suffered a season ending knee injury, he started 6 games between left guard and center, but was placed on the injured reserve list with a knee injury on November 30, missing the last 3 contests.

In 1989, he was the full-time starter at right guard where he started all 16 games. After the Raiders signed Max Montoya in Plan B free agency, Gesek became expendable and was traded to the Dallas Cowboys in exchange for a fifth round draft choice (#124-Ben Coates) on September 3, 1990.

=== Dallas Cowboys ===
In 1990, he passed Kevin Gogan on the depth chart and became the starter at right guard in the fifth game of the season. Gesek was the starter at right guard during his first three seasons with the Dallas Cowboys, including Super Bowl XXVII.

In 1991, he started the first 14 games at right guard until suffering a left ankle sprain against the New Orleans Saints. The next game against the Philadelphia Eagles, he was limited to only short yardage situations, but was able to recover for the rest of the season and the playoffs. The offensive line helped Emmitt Smith lead the league with 365 carries for 1,563 rushing yards.

In 1992, he started all 16 games at right guard. The offensive line helped the offense rank fourth in the league in total offense, fifth in rushing and passing. It also contributed to Smith winning his second consecutive NFL rushing title with 1,713 yards. He was a part of the XXVII winning team.

In 1993, he was injured in a pre-season game against the Raiders and was replaced by Kevin Gogan and remained in a reserve role, until Mark Stepnoski suffered a knee injury against the Minnesota Vikings in the 13th game of the season. After trying Frank Cornish as the replacement at center, the team settled on Gesek for the playoffs run and Super Bowl XXVIII.

His role in one of the greatest offensive lines in NFL history was detailed in NFL Network's 2013 A Football Life: "The Great Wall of Dallas". Before the start of the 1994 season, with four Cowboys offensive linemen declared as free agents, the Cowboys focused on re-signing guard Nate Newton, and Gesek became a sought after free agent and opted to change teams.

=== Washington Redskins ===
After fielding offers from several teams, including the Los Angeles Raiders and San Francisco 49ers, he signed a contract on March 16, 1994 as a free agent with the Washington Redskins, reuniting him with head coach Norv Turner, who was his offensive coordinator with the Cowboys. Although he had played most of his career at guard, the Washington Redskins signed him as a free agent to play center and allow the move of Raleigh McKenzie to right guard.

Gesek was the starting center during his 2 seasons with the team. In 1995, he started 12 games at center and four at right guard, despite being limited with pain in his neck and arm, caused by a bulging disk in his neck, which eventually forced him to retire. On August 20, 1996, he was waived injured and was replaced with a platoon of Jeff Uhlenhake and Cory Raymer. Gesek was ultimately granted his tenth year through arbitration when it was found the Redskins released him while injured.

== Personal life ==
After retiring from the NFL, Gesek became an entrepreneur, real estate developer, and founder of Optimus Capital Advisors, where he continues in his role as a financial advisor and firm principal. He is married to Gina and has four grown children, daughters Presley, Audra, Payton and son Tanner, as well as granddaughter Evaliah.
