= Wasswa Serwanga =

Ugandan gridiron football player (born 1976)

No. 43, 29, 23
- Position: Cornerback

Personal information
- Born: 23 July 1976 (age 50); Kampala, Uganda
- Listed height: 5 ft 11 in (1.80 m)
- Listed weight: 203 lb (92 kg)

Career information
- High school: Sacramento (Sacramento, California, U.S.)
- College: Sacramento State (1994); Pacific (1995); UCLA (1996–1997)
- NFL draft: 1998: undrafted

Career history
- Chicago Bears (1998)*; San Francisco 49ers (1999); Kansas City Chiefs (2000)*; Minnesota Vikings (2000–2001); Los Angeles Avengers (2003)
- * Offseason or practice squad member only

Career NFL statistics
- Tackles: 34
- Forced fumbles: 1
- Passes defended: 3
- Stats at Pro Football Reference

Career AFL statistics
- Tackles: 31
- Interceptions: 1
- Passes defended: 4
- Stats at ArenaFan.com

Wasswa Kenneth Serwanga (born 23 July 1976) is a Ugandan former professional American football cornerback in the National Football League (NFL) and Arena Football League (AFL). He played one season for the San Francisco 49ers and two for the Minnesota Vikings of the NFL, and one for the Los Angeles Avengers of the AFL. Serwanga was born in Uganda and moved to the U.S. as a child, where he attended Sacramento High School and later played college football for the Sacramento State Hornets, Pacific Tigers and UCLA Bruins. He is the identical twin brother of former NFL player Kato Serwanga.

== Early life ==
Serwanga was born on 23 July 1976 in Kampala, Uganda. He has three brothers and two sisters, including a twin brother, Kato. He was born 15 minutes earlier than his brother, for which he received his name, meaning "elder twin". He moved to the United States at age three. His parents moved after three of Serwanga's uncles were killed under the regime of Idi Amin for being wealthy; his father Patrick sold his possessions in exchange for plane tickets to bring the family to the U.S. Patrick himself had nearly been killed by Amin's regime, surviving an attempted murder by jumping from his moving car. The family arrived in Sacramento, California, and Patrick attempted to wire for his money, but never received it.

Serwanga's father worked washing dishes to provide for the family, who lived in a small apartment with only two beds. Serwanga grew up playing soccer before trying out football at either age nine or eleven, after watching his older brother James play sandlot football. He and his brother played football while attending Sacramento Charter High School, where they both were cornerbacks, with Wasswa being a starter. The twins were described as very competitive with each other, while Kato said that of Wasswa: "He's me, and I'm him. We're the same cats. We share every quality. We are about as similar as two people can be. We look as similar as two people could look." Following the 1993 season, both Wasswa Serwanga and his brother were named All-Metro League, with Wasswa having made 70 tackles and five interceptions. They both signed to play college football for the Sacramento State Hornets.

== College career ==
The twins both started at Sacramento State as freshmen in 1994, but transferred to the Pacific Tigers following one season when the school initially decided to drop football. They saw significant playing time with the Tigers in 1995, as both appeared in eight games (sitting out several due to transfer rules), with Wasswa totaling 23 tackles and two interceptions. After the 1995 season, it was announced that Pacific was ending its football team due to financial issues. They had to transfer again, with Wasswa committing to the UCLA Bruins while Kato went to the California Golden Bears, the first time the twins were on separate teams. Wasswa said that "We wanted to stay together, but the more we thought about it, the more we realized this might be the time to go to different schools ... If we went to the same school, we might end up competing to start at the same cornerback spot, which would be terrible."

In his first year at UCLA, 1996, Serwanga was a backup to Anthony Cobbs at the roverback position (a type of strong safety), also being a member of the kickoff unit. The twins faced off against each other when UCLA played California, with the News-Pilot describing them as being a "mirror image" of each other, as both were the same height (5 feet 11 inches (1.80 m)) and weight (190 pounds (86 kg)). The next season, he became a starter at roverback and was one of UCLA's leaders in sacks (placing second with five) and tackles. He also faced off against his brother for a second time. Serwanga helped UCLA compile a 9–2 record and reach the 1998 Cotton Bowl Classic, where they played against the Texas Longhorns.

== Professional career ==
Serwanga was signed by the Chicago Bears as an undrafted free agent following the 1998 NFL draft. His brother also signed a contract with the New England Patriots and played for them that year. Wasswa was released by the Bears on 21 August 1998. On 21 April 1999, he signed with the San Francisco 49ers. He was released on 5 September and re-signed to the practice squad two days later. He was signed to the active roster from the practice squad on 12 October 1999. He made his NFL debut five days later, recording no statistics in a 31–29 Week 6 win over the Carolina Panthers. He and his brother became the first Ugandan-born NFL players in history, and remain among only three to do it.

In Week 7, Serwanga posted his first statistics, making three tackles (two solo, one assisted) in a 40–16 loss to the Minnesota Vikings. He appeared in seven further games for the 49ers, finishing the season with nine games played and 11 tackles (10 solo, one assisted). He was mainly used as a special teams player and a reserve cornerback. The 1999 49ers finished with a record of 4–12. He was not re-signed and became a free agent after the season. In February 2000, he was selected in the first round of the NFL Europe draft by the Amsterdam Admirals.

On 24 April 2000, Serwanga signed with the Kansas City Chiefs. He was later released on 22 August. The following day, he was claimed off waivers by the Minnesota Vikings. He made the final roster as a reserve cornerback. In Week 3, the Vikings played against the New England Patriots featuring his brother, although he was inactive. After having been inactive for the first nine games of the season, he made his Vikings debut against the Arizona Cardinals and made a tackle on special teams. He made his first defensive tackle in Week 15 against the St. Louis Rams and was named starter at nickelback for Week 16 against the Green Bay Packers. He also started in the season finale, against the Indianapolis Colts, covering star wide receiver Marvin Harrison. In the game, he totaled 12 tackles, a forced fumble and a pass deflection, as Harrison caught 12 receptions for 109 yards and three touchdowns. Serwanga also started in the Vikings' two playoff games, totaling 11 tackles and four pass deflections before the team was eliminated 41–0 by the New York Giants. He finished the season with 18 tackles and a forced fumble in nine games played, two as a starter.

Serwanga made the Vikings' final roster again in 2001. He was limited by injury mid-season and was released on 4 December, finishing the year having appeared in seven games, all as a reserve. The Vikings compiled a record of 5–11, Serwanga having made five tackles in the 2001 season.

Serwanga signed with the Los Angeles Avengers of the Arena Football League (AFL) for the 2003 season. He appeared in five games for the Avengers, all as a starter, totaling 31 solo tackles, six assisted tackles, four pass breakups, an interception and a forced fumble. He was waived after the season. He finished his professional football career having appeared in 23 NFL games and five AFL games. In the NFL, he recorded 34 tackles and a forced fumble with two starts among his 23 appearances.

== See also ==
- Ugandan Americans
