= Marte Mapu =

American football player (born 1999)

No. 48 – Pittsburgh Steelers
- Position: Linebacker
- Roster status: Practice squad

Personal information
- Born: November 8, 1999 (age 26); Hawthorne, California, U.S.
- Listed height: 6 ft 3 in (1.91 m)
- Listed weight: 230 lb (104 kg)

Career information
- High school: Hawthorne
- College: Sacramento State (2017–2022)
- NFL draft: 2023: 3rd round, 76th overall pick

Career history
- New England Patriots (2023–2025); Houston Texans (2026)*; Pittsburgh Steelers (2026–present)*
- * Offseason or practice squad member only

Awards and highlights
- Big Sky Defensive Player of the Year (2022); First-team All-Big Sky (2022); Second-team All-Big Sky (2021)

Career NFL statistics as of 2025
- Total tackles: 89
- Sacks: 0.5
- Forced fumbles: 5
- Pass deflections: 12
- Interceptions: 3
- Stats at Pro Football Reference

Marte-Myles Mapu (born November 8, 1999) is a free agent American professional football linebacker for the Pittsburgh Steelers of the National Football League (NFL). He played college football for the Sacramento State Hornets, where he was named the Big Sky Conference's Defensive Player of the Year in 2022.

== Early life ==
Mapu was born on November 8, 1999, in Hawthorne, California. He attended Hawthorne High School, where he played quarterback and wide receiver on the football team. Mapu is of American Samoan descent.

== College career ==
Mapu redshirted his true freshman season for the Sacramento State Hornets. Mapu's redshirt junior season in 2020 was canceled due to the COVID-19 pandemic. As a redshirt senior, he was named second team All-Big Sky Conference. Mapu used the extra year of eligibility granted to college athletes due to the COVID-19 pandemic and returned for a sixth season. He was named the Big Sky Conference's Defensive Player of the Year in 2022.

== Professional career ==
Pre-draft measurables
Height	Weight
6 ft 2 5/8 in (1.90 m)	217 lb (98 kg)
Values from Pro Day

=== New England Patriots ===
Mapu was selected by the New England Patriots in the third round (76th overall) of the 2023 NFL draft. In Week 15 against the Kansas City Chiefs, Mapu recorded his first career interception against Patrick Mahomes.

On August 27, 2024, Mapu was placed on injured reserve to begin the season as the result of a calf injury. On October 5, Mapu was activated from injured reserve. In the 2025 season, Mapu had 25 total tackles (18 solo), one forced fumble, and one interception.

=== Houston Texans ===
On April 7, 2026, Mapu and a 2027 seventh-round pick were traded to the Houston Texans in exchange for a 2027 sixth-round pick. He was waived/injured by the Texans on August 24. On August 25, Mapu cleared waivers and was placed on injured reserve, but he was released on August 31.

=== Pittsburgh Steelers ===
On October 5, 2026, Mapu signed with the Pittsburgh Steelers' practice squad.
