= National Register of Historic Places listings in Texas County, Oklahoma =

Location of Texas County in Oklahoma

This is a list of the National Register of Historic Places listings in Texas County, Oklahoma.

This is intended to be a complete list of the properties on the National Register of Historic Places in Texas County, Oklahoma, United States. The locations of National Register properties for which the latitude and longitude coordinates are included below, may be seen in a map.

There are 24 properties listed on the National Register in the county, including 1 National Historic Landmark.

This National Park Service list is complete through NPS recent listings posted October 23, 2026.

== Current listings ==
	Name on the Register	Image	Date listed	Location	City or town	Description
1	Adams Woodframe Grain Elevator		May 13, 1983 (#83002129)	North of State Highway 3; 36°45′26″N 101°04′22″W	Adams	Condemned and burned down
2	Elmer Baker Barn	Elmer Baker Barn	December 12, 2012 (#12001040)	Mile 47 Rd. 36°51′43″N 101°10′48″W	Hooker	
3	Baker Woodframe Elevator		May 13, 1983 (#83002130)	SR 2847; 36°52′14″N 101°01′03″W	Baker	
4	Baker Woodframe Grain Elevator		May 13, 1983 (#83002131)	Off U.S. Route 64; 36°52′12″N 101°01′00″W	Baker	
5	CCC Ranch Headquarters		December 1, 1983 (#83004218)	West of Texhoma; 36°44′52″N 101°53′53″W	Texhoma	
6	Danholt	Danholt	June 14, 2013 (#13000394)	1208 N. May; 36°41′24″N 101°28′36″W	Guymon	
7	Easterwood Archeological Site	Easterwood Archeological Site	November 16, 1978 (#78002264)	Address restricted	Guymon	
8	Eva Woodframe Grain Elevator		May 13, 1983 (#83002132)	State Highway 95; 36°47′53″N 101°54′17″W	Eva	
9	Franklin Hall	Franklin Hall	September 6, 2007 (#07000909)	201 N. College Ave. 36°35′39″N 101°38′09″W	Goodwell	
10	Hooker Woodframe Grain Elevator	Hooker Woodframe Grain Elevator	May 13, 1983 (#83002133)	Off Texas Ave. 36°52′03″N 101°12′42″W	Hooker	
11	Hotel Dale	Hotel Dale	June 13, 2016 (#16000376)	118 NW. 6th St. 36°41′02″N 101°28′56″W	Guymon	By April 2024, the Dale Lofts
12	Hough Woodframe Elevator		May 13, 1983 (#83002134)	State Highway 95; 36°52′14″N 101°34′35″W	Hough	
13	Johnson-Cline Archeological Site	Johnson-Cline Archeological Site	November 16, 1978 (#78002267)	Address restricted	Texhoma	
14	Mouser Grain Elevator		October 7, 1983 (#83004220)	Off State Highway 136; 36°52′14″N 101°24′49″W	Mouser	
15	Mouser Woodframe Grain Elevator/Collingwood Elevator		May 13, 1983 (#83002135)	Off State Highway 136; 36°52′14″N 101°24′58″W	Mouser	
16	Nash II-Clawson Archeological Site	Nash II-Clawson Archeological Site	October 2, 1978 (#78002265)	Address restricted	Guymon	
17	Old Hardesty	Old Hardesty	June 20, 1974 (#74001669)	Address restricted	Hardesty	
18	Optima Grain Elevator		May 13, 1983 (#83002136)	U.S. Route 54; 36°45′41″N 101°21′17″W	Optima	
19	Penick House	Penick House	September 28, 1984 (#84003436)	218 N. East St. 36°30′23″N 101°46′51″W	Texhoma	
20	Shores Archeological Site	Shores Archeological Site	November 27, 1978 (#78002263)	Address restricted	Eva	
21	Stamper Site	Stamper Site	October 15, 1966 (#66000635)	Address restricted	Optima	
22	Texas County Courthouse	Texas County Courthouse	August 24, 1984 (#84003439)	319 N. Main St. 36°40′53″N 101°28′52″W	Guymon	
23	Tracey Woodframe Grain Elevator		May 13, 1983 (#83002137)	North of U.S. Route 64; 36°49′15″N 101°45′39″W	Muncey	
24	Two Sisters Archeological Site	Two Sisters Archeological Site	October 2, 1978 (#78002266)	Address restricted	Guymon	

== See also ==
- List of National Historic Landmarks in Oklahoma
- National Register of Historic Places listings in Oklahoma
