= Straight, Oklahoma =

Unincorporated community in Oklahoma, US

Coordinates: 36°52′36″N 101°26′55″W

Location of Straight within the state of Oklahoma

Straight is an unincorporated community in Texas County in the Oklahoma Panhandle, United States.

Straight is located 22 kilometers (13.69 miles) west of Hooker and 24 kilometers (15 miles) north of Guymon. Oklahoma State Highway 135 passes three kilometers (two miles) to the west and the community of Mouser is three kilometers (two miles) to the east. Pony Creek (a tributary to the Beaver River), flows past to the southwest of the community and Wild Horse Lake is approximately two miles to the north.

The Beaver, Meade and Englewood Railroad built through the area in the 1929-1930 timeframe, and Straight was purposely sited along its tracks. That line was abandoned in 1972.
