= Mouser, Oklahoma =

- Unincorporated community
- Location within Oklahoma
- Coordinates: 36°52′14″N 101°24′55″W
- Country: United States
- State: Oklahoma
- County: Texas
- Elevation: 3,127 ft (953 m)
- Time zone: UTC-6 (Central (CST))
  - Summer (DST): UTC-5 (CDT)
- Area code: 580
- GNIS feature ID: 1100652

Mouser is an unincorporated community in Texas County, Oklahoma, United States. Mouser is 13.5 miles (21.7 km) north-northeast of Guymon and 11 miles (18 km) west of Hooker. The community of Straight is two miles to the west. The Beaver, Meade and Englewood Railroad (BM&E) reached the locale in the summer of 1928, and two grain elevators in Mouser, the Mouser Grain Elevator and the Mouser Woodframe Grain Elevator/Collingwood Elevator, which were built along the BM&E's tracks, are now listed on the National Register of Historic Places listings in Texas County, Oklahoma.

== Transportation ==
Mouser is just off County Road 7, east of Oklahoma State Highway 136 and west of US Route 64.

Guymon Municipal Airport is about 18 miles south-southwest, while commercial air transportation is available out of Liberal Mid-America Regional Airport in Kansas, approximately 33 miles east-northeast.
