= Anchor D Ranch =

Coordinates: 36.71°N 101.61°W

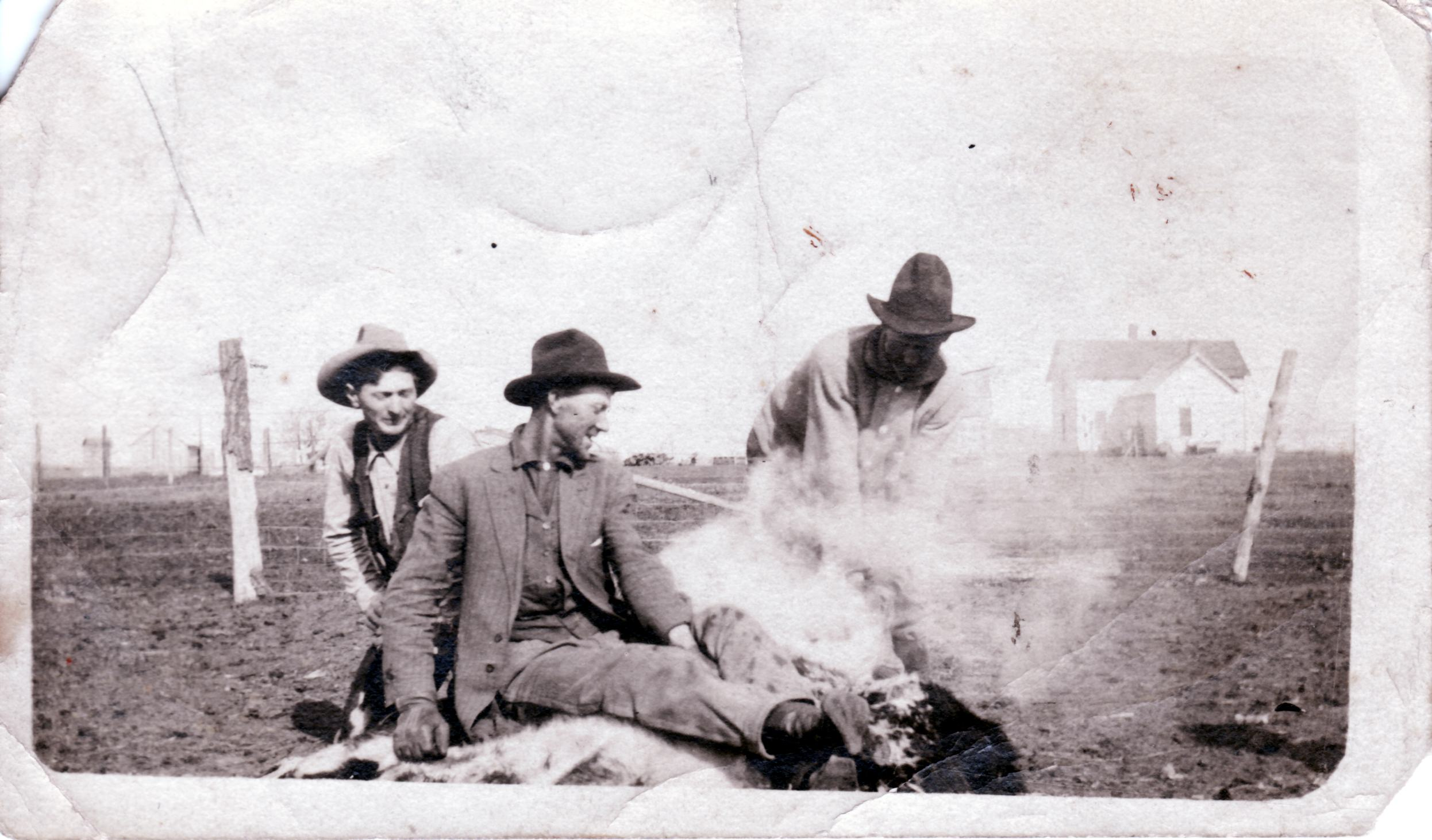
Cowboys At Anchor D Ranch, 1917

The Anchor D Ranch in Guymon, Oklahoma was one of the largest cattle ranches in the No Man's Land section of the Oklahoma/Texas Panhandle area. It was created around 1878 by Ezra Dudley, an investor from Newton, Massachusetts and his son, John. The ranch was headquartered on the Beaver River, in what is now Texas County, Oklahoma. After buying his first herd of cattle in south Texas, he hired experienced cowboys to drive them to the ranch. He continued to add more cattle, until he eventually he was feeding around thirty thousand cattle on an estimated 960,000 acres (1,500 mi^{2}). (Note: Until 1890, the panhandle was considered public land and the U.S. Government allowed cattlemen to pasture cattle at now cost. This practice ended in 1890, when the Panhandle was officially awarded to Oklahoma Territory.)

After 1890, political pressure from the public for more homesteads in the Panhandle, combined with an economic downturn in 1893, convinced Dudley that he should liquidate his cattle empire. Dudley sold his ranch to T. C. Schumaker and moved back to Massachusetts.

Schumaker continued to expand the Anchor D by purchasing several nearby smaller ranches, but experienced financial problems by the turn of the 20th century. Another investor, Howard M. Stonebraker, bought the Anchor D operation, as well as the brand, in 1904. Edwin Zea, a Kansas City banker, came aboard as Stonebraker's partner. The partnership was renamed the Stonebraker and Zea Cattle Company. In 1911, the state of Oklahoma chartered the Stonebraker and Zea Livestock Company, and listed John H. Lucas as a third incorporator.

The winters of 1917 and 1918 were unusually harsh, causing a large number of cattle to die. Stonebraker and Zea worked to offset these losses by reducing the scale of their operations. They subdivided the ranch by platting a substantial fraction of the land into smaller farms which they sold under the auspices of the Oklahoma and Texas Land and Loan Company. By 1937, the Anchor D ranch consisted of about 63,000 acres (98 mi^{2}). In 1939, Zea's widow sold the remaining ranch land to R. S. Coon.

In 1970, R. S. Coon Memorial Foundation sold the Anchor D land, mostly to Jack Freeman and Lewis Mayer. The Freeman Ranch added 28,200 acres (44.1 mi^{2}) from the sale, thereby becoming one of the state's largest ranches.
