= Stamper Site =

- U.S. National Register of Historic Places
- U.S. National Historic Landmark
- Location: 36.728150, -101.320510
- Nearest city: Optima, Oklahoma
- Built: 1200
- Architectural style: Antelope Creek Phase
- NRHP reference No.: 66000635

Significant dates
- Added to NRHP: October 15, 1966
- Designated NHL: July 19, 1964

The Stamper Site, designated by the Smithsonian trinomial 34TX1, is an archaeological site in rural Texas County, Oklahoma. The site has historic significance for the role its finds have played in the development of archaeologists' understanding of cultural contact and migration in the southern plains. It was declared a National Historic Landmark in 1964.

== Description ==
The Stamper Site is south of the town of Optima, on a terrace overlooking the North Canadian River but below a higher escarpment. The site takes its name from Charles Stamper, who homesteaded the area in 1886. Its major features are eighteen "rooms" or walled structures, whose remnants are visible on the surface. The site has yielded stone projectiles, pottery fragments, and evidence of human burials.

The site had been known locally as a significant prehistoric site for many years before it was brought to the attention of professional archaeologists. In 1929 J. Willis Stovall of the University of Oklahoma (OU) discovered the site, probably while working at another nearby site. An OU-funded dig took place in 1933, in which several of the rooms were investigated, including one that had been substantially vandalized, and the largest of the structures. Further investigation took place in 1934 as part of a federal New Deal program that was canceled in 1935. Analysis of the early reports and finds has yielded indications that there are as many as six feet of cultural deposits in some areas, indicating a long period of occupation. A report published in 1950 identified the site as a type site for the "Optima Focus", but later research and finds have suggested it is not significantly different than the Antelope Creek Phase.

== See also ==
- List of National Historic Landmarks in Oklahoma
- National Register of Historic Places listings in Texas County, Oklahoma
