= Beaver, Meade and Englewood Railroad =

Overview
- Headquarters: Beaver, Oklahoma
- Locale: Oklahoma
- Dates of operation: 1912–1972

Technical
- Track gauge: 4 ft 8 1/2 in (1,435 mm)
- Length: 105 mi (169 km)

The Beaver, Meade and Englewood Railroad (BM&E) extended from Beaver, Oklahoma to Keyes, Oklahoma in the Oklahoma Panhandle, about 105 miles. It was chartered in 1912, and abandoned in 1972.

== History ==
The BM&E started as an effort by the citizens of Beaver, Oklahoma to ensure survival of their town by getting it connected to the railroad grid. It was initiated at a town meeting on December 28, 1911, after the Wichita Falls and Northwestern Railway (WF&NW), a subsidiary of the Missouri-Kansas-Texas Railroad (MKT), declined to build to their locale. Formally incorporated January 19, 1912, the railroad's ultimate goal was to create two trunk lines, one running north-northwest to Meade, Kansas to connect to the Chicago, Rock Island and Pacific Railroad (CRI&P), and the other running east-northeast to Englewood, Kansas to connect to the Atchison, Topeka and Santa Fe Railway (AT&SF). However, the minimum goal was to run north to Forgan, Oklahoma, to at least connect with the WF&NW, which had run a line into Forgan from Altus, Oklahoma. Having little capitalization of its own, unable to talk other railways into financing the effort, and prevented from issuing railroad bonds by Oklahoma law, the town took unorthodox paths to get it built. The town passed bonds for a light and water plant, and simply used the proceeds to help fund the railroad. And, the town tried to interest farmers along the route in grading the right-of-way for the line, but this effort was less successful the further the line got from Beaver. Making little progress, the railroad was eventually sold to Jacob A. Achenbach, a 69-year-old railroad builder who had already made a small fortune, and his partner Ira B. Blackstock. The partners completed the line into Forgan in 1915, about 6.6 miles with an additional .8 of a mile in yard tracks and sidings.

Progress on connection to the towns of Meade or Englewood was stymied by World War I; and eventually, the partners discarded those goals and decided to build west, further into the Oklahoma Panhandle, to take advantage of the booming wheat industry there. Approval to run the 39.2 miles from Forgan to Hooker—a town on the CRI&P line—was granted January 29, 1924, but obstruction by another railroad and other factors prevented placing the line in full service until December 31, 1927. The partners subsequently proposed extending the line much further to the west, all the way to Des Moines, New Mexico, in order to both traverse more wheat-growing lands and to facilitate movement of New Mexico coal to Oklahoma. But permission was granted to build only as far as Keyes, Oklahoma, which had a connection to the AT&SF. The BM&E reached Mouser in the summer of 1928, Hough the following summer, Eva before the end of 1930, and Keyes on June 25, 1931, giving the railroad approximately 105 miles of total track.

At this point both the CRI&P and the MKT became interested in buying the line, and following jockeying between the two, the BM&E became a wholly owned subsidiary of the MKT on July 1, 1931. The BM&E continued to exist in this manner until the whole line was abandoned on August 30, 1972.

== Legacy ==
Beaver survived as a town. Several other towns formed along the BM&E track, including Hough, Baker, and Straight.

The Baker Woodframe Elevator, the separate Baker Woodframe Grain Elevator, the Eva Woodframe Grain Elevator, the Hooker Woodframe Grain Elevator, the Hough Woodframe Elevator, the Mouser Grain Elevator, the separate Mouser Woodframe Grain Elevator/Collingwood Elevator, and the Tracey Woodframe Grain Elevator, were all located on the BM&E's line and are now on the National Register of Historic Places listings in Texas County, Oklahoma. Similarly, the Floris Grain Elevator, as well as the Turpin Grain Elevator, were on the BM&E's line and are now on the National Register of Historic Places listings in Beaver County, Oklahoma.

The passenger railroad station originally built by the BM&E remains in Eva.
