= List of National Historic Landmarks in Oklahoma =

The List of National Historic Landmarks in Oklahoma contains the landmarks designated by the U.S. Federal Government for the U.S. state of Oklahoma.

There are 22 National Historic Landmarks in Oklahoma. The following table is a complete list.

== Key ==
	National Historic Landmark
^{†}	National Historic Landmark District
^{#}	National Historic Site, National Historical Park, National Memorial, or National Monument
^{*}	Delisted Landmark

== List ==
	Landmark name	Image	Date designated	Location	County	Description
1^{†}	101 Ranch Historic District	101 Ranch Historic District	May 15, 1975 (#73001560)	Ponca City; 36°36′47″N 97°08′34″W	Kay	Ranch where rodeo bull-dogging was developed to an art form by Bill Pickett; home base of 101 Ranch Wild West Show.
2	Bizzell Library	Bizzell Library	January 3, 2001 (#01000071)	Norman; 35°12′28″N 97°26′44″W	Cleveland	Library of University of Oklahoma, focus of racial segregation Supreme Court case.
3^{†}	Boley Historic District	Boley Historic District	May 15, 1975 (#75001568)	Boley; 35°29′44″N 96°28′58″W	Okfuskee	All-black town founded in 1903, product of segregationist policies.
4	Boston Avenue Methodist Episcopal Church, South	Boston Avenue Methodist Episcopal Church, South	January 20, 1999 (#78002270)	Tulsa; 36°08′38″N 95°59′04″W	Tulsa	One of finest examples of ecclesiastical Art Deco architecture in the U.S.
5	Camp Nichols	Camp Nichols	May 23, 1963 (#66000628)	Wheeless; 36°45′10″N 102°55′35″W	Cimarron	Ruins of fort built by Kit Carson to protect the Cimarron Cutoff trail (Santa Fe Trail) followers from hostile Kiowa and Apache.
6	Cherokee National Capitol	Cherokee National Capitol	July 4, 1961 (#66000627)	Tahlequah; 35°54′38″N 94°58′14″W	Cherokee	Capitol of the Cherokee nation from 1869 to 1907, when Oklahoma became a state.
7	Creek National Capitol	Creek National Capitol	July 4, 1961 (#66000632)	Okmulgee; 35°37′24″N 95°58′18″W	Okmulgee	Capitol of Creek nation from 1878 to 1907, now a museum.
8	Deer Creek Site		April 16, 1964 (#66000630)	Newkirk	Kay	Archeological site, site of a fortified village of the Wichita.
9	Fort Gibson	Fort Gibson	December 12, 1960 (#66000631)	Fort Gibson; 35°48′14″N 95°15′26″W	Muskogee	Fort built in 1824 in the Indian Territory.
10	Fort Sill	Fort Sill	December 12, 1960 (#66000629)	Fort Sill; 34°42′15″N 98°30′30″W	Comanche	Only still-active fort from Indian wars on the south plains.
11	Fort Washita	Fort Washita	June 23, 1965 (#66000626)	Nida; 34°06′13″N 96°32′54″W	Bryan	Established in 1842 to protect the Choctaws and Chickasaws from the plains Indians.
12^{†}	Guthrie Historic District	Guthrie Historic District	January 20, 1999 (#74001664)	Guthrie; 35°52′48″N 97°25′31″W	Logan	Now a historic district.
13^{†}	Honey Springs Battlefield	Honey Springs Battlefield	February 27, 2013 (#13000280)	Rentiesville; 35°31′53″N 95°29′09″W	McIntosh and Muskogee	Site of the Battle of Honey Springs, a Civil War battle known for its preponderance of non-white combatants.
14	Ernest Whitworth Marland Mansion	Ernest Whitworth Marland Mansion	December 22, 1977 (#73001561)	Ponca City; 36°43′01″N 97°03′38″W	Kay	Home of Oklahoma politician Ernest Whitworth Marland.
15	McLemore Site		July 19, 1964 (#66000636)	Colony	Washita	An archeological site.
16	Murrell Home	Murrell Home	May 30, 1974 (#70000530)	Park Hill; 35°51′21″N 94°57′32″W	Cherokee	A house.
17^{†}	Platt National Park Historic District	Platt National Park Historic District	July 7, 2011 (#11000628)	Sulphur; 34°30′02″N 96°58′20″W	Murray	Square mile sold by Chickasaw Nation to federal government for park use in 1902
18	Price Tower	Price Tower	March 29, 2007 (#74001670)	Bartlesville; 36°44′51″N 95°58′34″W	Washington	A Frank Lloyd Wright designed building. His only realized skyscraper design completed in 1956, and commissioned by H.C. Price Petroleum Company.
19	Sequoyah's Cabin	Sequoyah's Cabin	December 21, 1965 (#66000634)	Akins; 35°30′51″N 94°39′07″W	Sequoyah	Log cabin home of Sequoyah, who created "talking leaves", written language for the Cherokee.
20	Stamper Site		July 19, 1964 (#66000635)	Optima	Texas	Archeological site.
21^{#}	Washita Battlefield	Washita Battlefield	January 12, 1965 (#66000633)	Cheyenne; 35°37′03″N 99°42′01″W	Roger Mills	Where George Custer led the Seventh Cavalry surprise attack on village of Cheyenne Chief Black Kettle in 1868.
22	Wheelock Academy		December 21, 1965 (#66000949)	Millerton; 33°59′38″N 94°59′18″W	McCurtain	Originally a missionary school for girls of the Choctaw nation, this became an academy and the model for other academies of the 5 civilized nations.

== See also ==
- National Register of Historic Places listings in Oklahoma
- List of National Historic Landmarks by state
- List of National Natural Landmarks in Oklahoma
