= Hough, Oklahoma =

- Unincorporated community
- Location within the state of Oklahoma Hough, Oklahoma (the United States)
- Coordinates: 36°52′15″N 101°34′38″W
- Country: United States
- State: Oklahoma
- County: Texas

Area
  - Total: 0.069 sq mi (0.18 km^{2})
  - Land: 0.069 sq mi (0.18 km^{2})
  - Water: 0 sq mi (0.00 km^{2})
- Elevation: 3,284 ft (1,001 m)

Population (2020)
  - Total: 20
  - Density: 290.2/sq mi (112.03/km^{2})
- Time zone: UTC-6 (Central (CST))
  - Summer (DST): UTC-5 (CDT)
- FIPS code: 40-36115

Hough is a small unincorporated rural community in Texas County, Oklahoma, United States, north-northwest of Guymon. The population was 20 at the time of the 2020 census.

== History ==
The townsite was officially platted on July 20, 1928. The Beaver, Meade and Englewood Railroad built through the area in the 1929-1930 timeframe, and Hough was purposely sited along its route. That trackage was abandoned in 1972, but the Hough Woodframe Elevator, which was situated along the tracks, still exists and is on the National Register of Historic Places listings in Texas County, Oklahoma.

== Demographics ==
Historical population
Census	Pop.	Note	%±
2020	20		—
U.S. Decennial Census

=== 2020 census ===
As of the 2020 census, Hough had a population of 20. The median age was 53.3 years. 30.0% of residents were under the age of 18 and 20.0% of residents were 65 years of age or older. For every 100 females there were 53.8 males, and for every 100 females age 18 and over there were 40.0 males age 18 and over.

0.0% of residents lived in urban areas, while 100.0% lived in rural areas.

There were 11 households in Hough, of which 36.4% had children under the age of 18 living in them. Of all households, 72.7% were married-couple households, 9.1% were households with a male householder and no spouse or partner present, and 18.2% were households with a female householder and no spouse or partner present. About 27.3% of all households were made up of individuals and 27.3% had someone living alone who was 65 years of age or older.

There were 11 housing units, of which 0.0% were vacant. The homeowner vacancy rate was 0.0% and the rental vacancy rate was 0.0%.

Racial composition as of the 2020 census
Race	Number	Percent
White	12	60.0%
Black or African American	0	0.0%
American Indian and Alaska Native	1	5.0%
Asian	0	0.0%
Native Hawaiian and Other Pacific Islander	0	0.0%
Some other race	1	5.0%
Two or more races	6	30.0%
Hispanic or Latino (of any race)	7	35.0%

== Education ==
It is in the Straight Public School school district, an elementary school district.
