= Tyrone, Oklahoma =

- Town
- Location in Texas County and state of Oklahoma.
- Coordinates: 36°57′16″N 101°4′3″W
- Country: United States
- State: Oklahoma
- County: Texas

Area
  - Total: 0.42 sq mi (1.09 km^{2})
  - Land: 0.42 sq mi (1.09 km^{2})
  - Water: 0 sq mi (0.00 km^{2})
- Elevation: 2,920 ft (890 m)

Population (2020)
  - Total: 729
  - Density: 1,726.4/sq mi (666.58/km^{2})
- Time zone: UTC-6 (Central (CST))
  - Summer (DST): UTC-5 (CDT)
- ZIP code: 73951
- Area code: 580
- FIPS code: 40-75750
- GNIS feature ID: 1099138

Tyrone is a town in northeastern Texas County, Oklahoma, United States. The population was 729 at the 2020 census.

== History ==
The town was reportedly named by a railway vice president when the railroad passed through the area. It was named after Tyrone, Pennsylvania, where the V.P.'s mother lived. The towns on the railway in Texas County (see below) were 10 miles apart, either for the distance between railroad worker camps, or because of needs for water by locomotives at that distance apart. Nearby Shades Well (three miles northeast) was the trailhead for many cattle drives in the late 19th century. It was larger than Dodge City for a time, and still has mounds of broken glass from beer and whisky bottles consumed by drovers. The trailhead later moved again and it was abandoned.

== Geography ==
Tyrone is located at 36°57′16″N 101°04′03″W.

According to the United States Census Bureau, the town has a total area of 0.4 square miles (1.0 km^{2}), all land.

== Demographics ==
Historical population
Census	Pop.	Note	%±
1930	482		—
1940	257		−46.7%
1950	261		1.6%
1960	456		74.7%
1970	588		28.9%
1980	928		57.8%
1990	880		−5.2%
2000	880		0.0%
2010	762		−13.4%
2020	729		−4.3%
U.S. Decennial Census

=== 2020 census ===
As of the 2020 census, Tyrone had a population of 729. The median age was 36.1 years. 26.7% of residents were under the age of 18 and 15.8% of residents were 65 years of age or older. For every 100 females there were 87.9 males, and for every 100 females age 18 and over there were 90.0 males age 18 and over.

0.0% of residents lived in urban areas, while 100.0% lived in rural areas.

There were 272 households in Tyrone, of which 37.5% had children under the age of 18 living in them. Of all households, 48.2% were married-couple households, 16.2% were households with a male householder and no spouse or partner present, and 27.9% were households with a female householder and no spouse or partner present. About 19.9% of all households were made up of individuals and 8.1% had someone living alone who was 65 years of age or older.

There were 314 housing units, of which 13.4% were vacant. The homeowner vacancy rate was 2.1% and the rental vacancy rate was 14.4%.

Racial composition as of the 2020 census
Race	Number	Percent
White	452	62.0%
Black or African American	5	0.7%
American Indian and Alaska Native	1	0.1%
Asian	3	0.4%
Native Hawaiian and Other Pacific Islander	0	0.0%
Some other race	167	22.9%
Two or more races	101	13.9%
Hispanic or Latino (of any race)	314	43.1%

=== 2000 census ===
As of the 2000 census, there were 880 people, 324 households, and 243 families residing in the town. The population density was 2,139.8 inhabitants per square mile (826.2/km^{2}). There were 374 housing units at an average density of 909.4 per square mile (351.1/km^{2}).

There were 324 households, out of which 40.7% had children under the age of 18 living with them, 60.8% were married couples living together, 10.5% had a female householder with no husband present, and 25.0% were non-families. 21.6% of all households were made up of individuals, and 5.6% had someone living alone who was 65 years of age or older. The average household size was 2.72 and the average family size was 3.18.

In the town, the population was spread out, with 31.1% under the age of 18, 9.8% from 18 to 24, 30.5% from 25 to 44, 21.4% from 45 to 64, and 7.3% who were 65 years of age or older. The median age was 31 years. For every 100 females, there were 97.8 males. For every 100 females age 18 and over, there were 98.7 males.

The median income for a household in the town was $33,550, and the median income for a family was $37,500. Males had a median income of $28,438 versus $20,156 for females. The per capita income for the town was $12,826. About 6.0% of families and 8.9% of the population were below the poverty line, including 9.1% of those under age 18 and 12.1% of those age 65 or over.

== Transportation ==
Tyrone is on U.S. Route 54, northeast of Hooker and southwest of Liberal, Kansas.

Commercial air transportation is available at Liberal Mid-America Regional Airport in Kansas, approximately 11 miles northeast.

Rail freight service is available from the Union Pacific Railroad.

== Education ==
It is in the Tyrone Public Schools school district.
