= Caroline Henderson (author) =

American woman farmer

Caroline A. Henderson
- Born: Caroline Agnes Boa; 1877; Wisconsin, US
- Died: 1966 (aged 88–89); Phoenix, Arizona, US
- Education: Mount Holyoke College, University of Kansas
- Occupations: Schoolteacher, farmer, author
- Spouse: Wilhelmine Eugene (Bill) Henderson
- Children: Eleanor Henderson

Caroline Henderson (1877–1966) was an American school teacher, farmer and author during the Dust Bowl. Born Caroline Boa in Wisconsin and raised in Iowa, she attended Mount Holyoke College, graduating in 1901. After teaching in Iowa until 1907, she relocated to Texas County in the Oklahoma Panhandle. She married local farmer Bill Henderson in 1908, the same year she bought a 160-acre farm near Eva, Oklahoma. Caroline and Bill had one daughter, Eleanor, born in 1909.

When their daughter was old enough for college, Eleanor chose to attend the University of Kansas. She earned both a Bachelor of Arts degree and an M.D. at Kansas. Meanwhile, Caroline helped pay her daughter's educational expenses by moving to Lawrence with her. The two shared an apartment, and Caroline found work teaching school. Caroline also found time to enroll in some graduate courses and earned an M. A. degree from Kansas in 1935.

== Biography ==
=== Early life ===
Caroline Henderson was born on April 7, 1877, in Wisconsin. As the eldest daughter of a prosperous Iowa farmer, she grew up on a farm in Iowa, and dreamed of having a farm of her own. She graduated from Mount Holyoke College in 1901. Striking out on her own, she moved to a small community in the Oklahoma Panhandle, bought her own farm, and began living her dream. She married a local farmer in 1908, and they raised one daughter. In 1935, she earned an M. A. from the University of Kansas.

=== Career ===
She taught English and Latin at a high school in Red Oak, Iowa, from 1901 to 1903, and then taught in Des Moines until 1907. In that year, she moved to the tiny community of Eva, Texas County, in the Oklahoma Panhandle, where she staked a claim on 160 acres (0.65 km^{2}) of farm land, and lived in a one-room 14 feet (4.3 m) by 16 feet (4.9 m) shack.

After she married a local farmer in 1908, she farmed with her husband, Will Henderson, in Eva, Oklahoma. During their years of farming, her family weathered the droughts, dust storms, and blizzards that befell the region.

Her letters about the events of the Dust Bowl period were published in The Ladies' World (regular column entitled "Our Homestead Lady"), Practical Farmer, and The Atlantic Monthly. Her letters detail both the prosperity of the period before the disaster, and the loss of crops, animals and other amenities during the Dust Bowl years.

=== Personal life ===
Caroline married Wilhelmine Eugene (Bill) Henderson in 1908. They raised one daughter, Eleanor, born in 1909. After Eleanor finished her early education in Oklahoma, she enrolled in the University of Kansas, where she earned a BA and MD degrees. Caroline moved to Lawrence, Kansas, where she shared Eleanor's apartment and got a job teaching school, in order to help put her daughter through University. Caroline also enrolled in University of Kansas, took graduate courses in English and earned a master's degree there in 1935.

=== Death ===
She died August 4, 1966, in Phoenix, Arizona. She was survived by her daughter and a grandson.

== Legacy ==
In recent years, her letters have been featured prominently in the PBS documentary The Dust Bowl.
