= Eva, Oklahoma =

- Unincorporated community
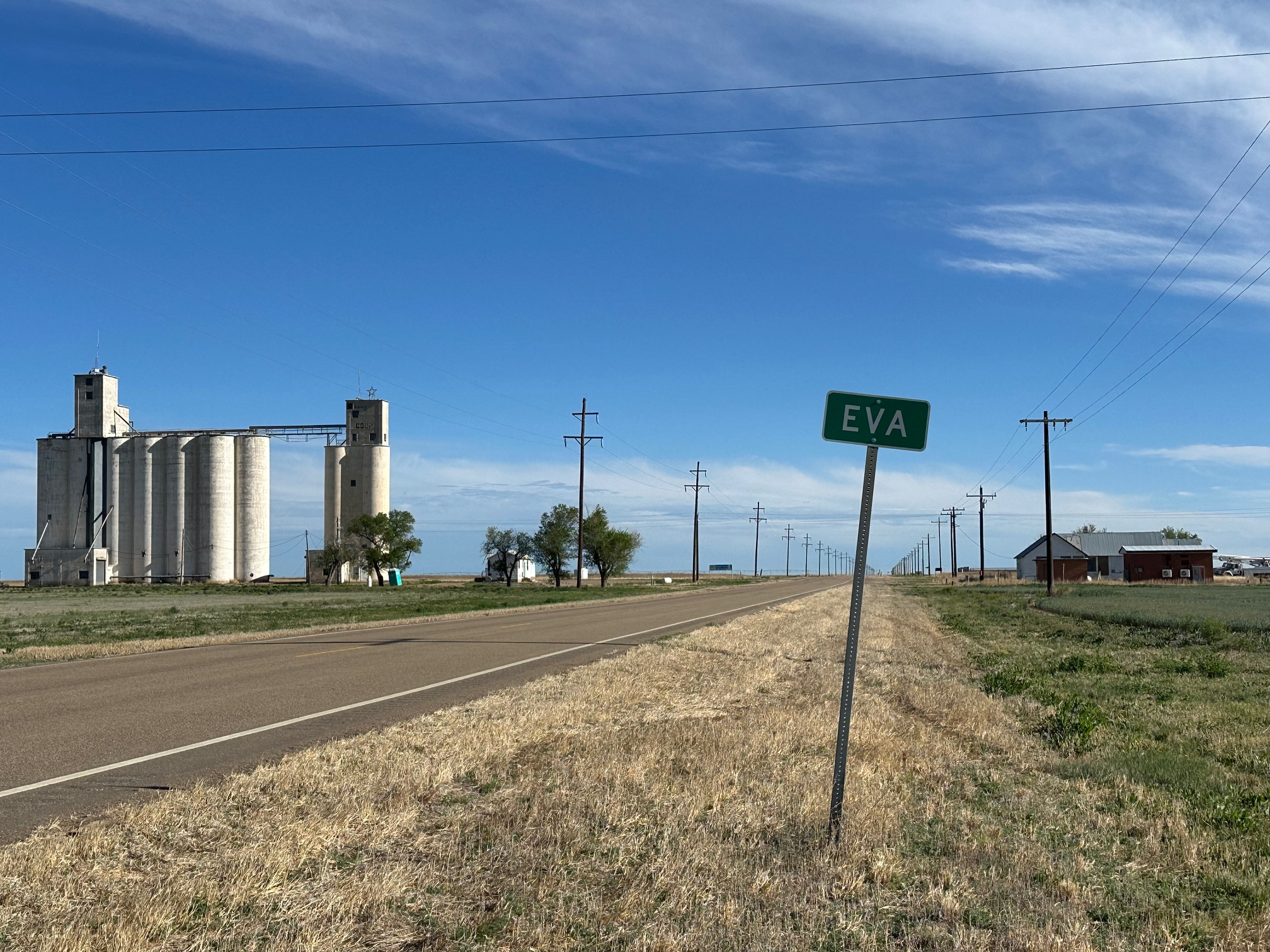
- Eva, Oklahoma in April 2024

- Location within the state of Oklahoma Eva, Oklahoma (the United States)
- Coordinates: 36°47′54″N 101°54′25″W
- Country: United States
- State: Oklahoma
- County: Texas
- Elevation: 3,573 ft (1,089 m)
- Time zone: UTC-6 (Central (CST))
  - Summer (DST): UTC-5 (CDT)
- GNIS feature ID: 1100401

Eva is an unincorporated community in Texas County, Oklahoma, United States. It is located along State Highway 95, approximately two miles north of U.S. Route 412.

== History ==
The Beaver, Meade and Englewood Railroad built through Eva by the end of 1930. That line was abandoned in 1972, but the Eva Woodframe Grain Elevator built along its tracks was added to the National Register of Historic Places listings in Texas County, Oklahoma.

== Notable people ==
- Caroline Henderson (1877–1966), school teacher, farmer, author, lived on farm east of Eva

== See also ==
- National Register of Historic Places listings in Texas County, Oklahoma
