= Gordon Grice =

American writer

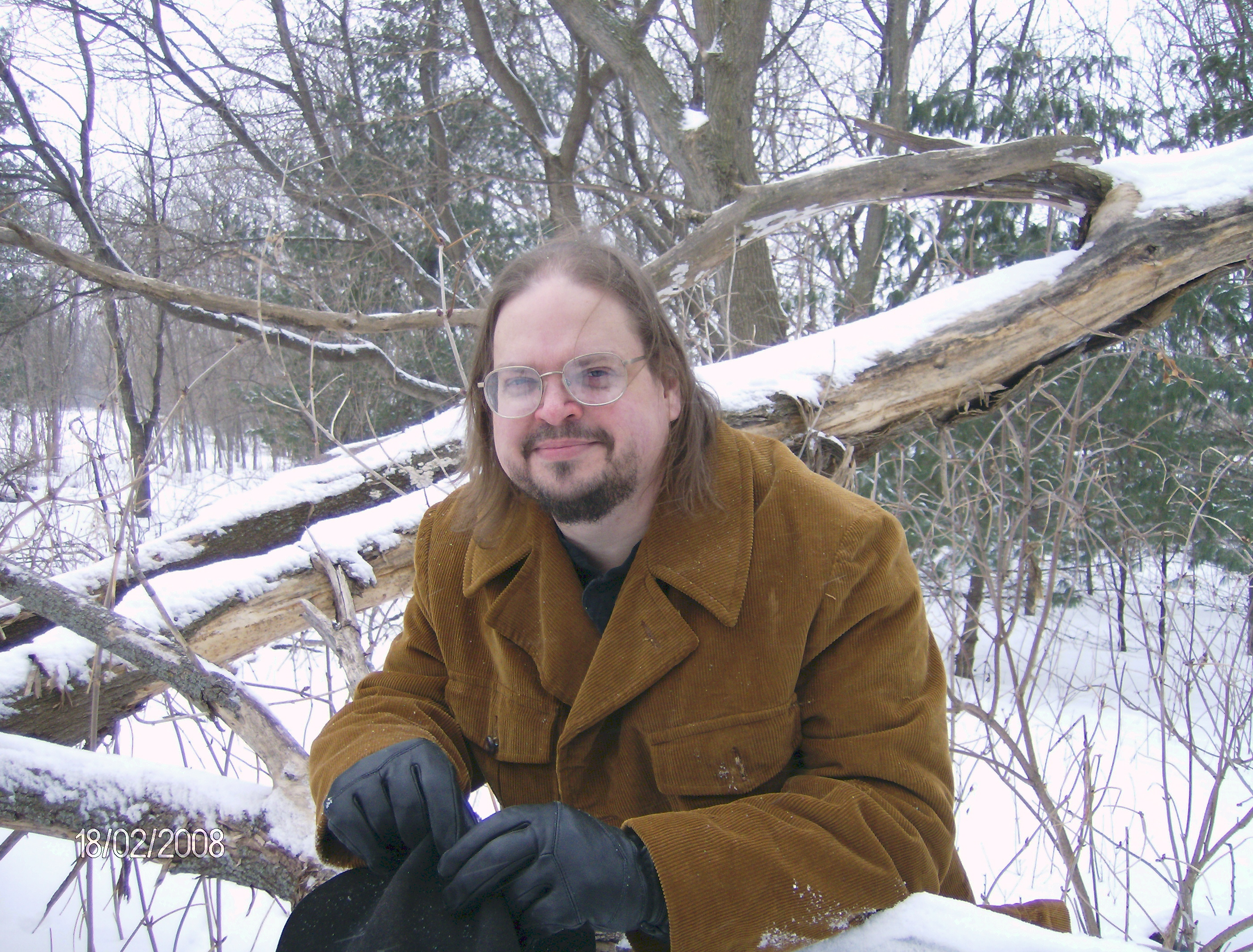
Gordon Grice in the woods of Wisconsin

Gordon Grice (born 1965, Guymon, Oklahoma) is an American science writer and horror writer.

== Life ==
Grice grew up in rural Oklahoma, a setting that has figured in much of his writing. He graduated from Oklahoma State University with a BA in English and the University of Arkansas with a Master of Fine Arts in Creative Writing. He is married and has three children. He has taught creative writing for California Institute of the Arts and the UCLA Extension Writers' Program.

His book The Red Hourglass: Lives of the Predators (1998) was listed among the Los Angeles Times Best Nonfiction Books of the Year and the New York Public Library's 25 Books to Remember for 1998. Deadly Kingdom: The Book of Dangerous Animals was published in 2010. Wall Street journal listed it among the "Five Best: Nature Books." Revised editions, retitled The Book of Deadly Animals appeared in 2011 (UK) and 2012 (US). Critic Mark Dery described his work thus: "Fascinated by the alien ways of the nonhuman world, Grice combines the sardonic deadpan of noir fiction with the best naturalists' unsentimental scrutiny of animal behavior and a rural midwesterner's applied knowledge of the predator-prey relationship. A Jean-Henri Fabre for literati who drive pickups with rifle racks."

Grice's other works include Shark Attacks: Inside the Mind of the Ocean's Most Terrifying Predator (eBook; National Geographic, 2012) and the children's book Cabinet of Curiosities: Collecting and Understanding the Wonders of the Natural World (Workman Publishing, 2015). He has also published poetry, fiction, essays, and articles. His nonfiction has appeared in Harper's, The New Yorker, Discover, Popular Science, and others. His horror stories have appeared in ChiZine, Aurealis, and other magazines and anthologies.

== Awards ==
- "Hide" Honorable Mention in The Year's Best Fantasy and Horror 2006 (Ellen Datlow, Ed.)
- "The White Cat" (short story) chosen for Best of the 'Net 2006
- 1999 Whiting Award
- Finalist for the PEN Center West Book Awards in research nonfiction for 1999

== Works ==
- The Red Hourglass: Lives of the Predators. Delacorte Press. 1998. ISBN 978-0-385-31887-7.
- Deadly Kingdom: The Book of Dangerous Animals. The Dial Press. May 18, 2010. ISBN 978-0-385-33562-1.
- Shark Attacks: Inside the Mind of the Ocean's Most Terrifying Predator. National Geographic. 2012. ASIN B0061BWNIE.
- Cabinet of Curiosities: Collecting and Understanding the Wonders of the Natural World. Workman Publishing. 2015. ISBN 978-0761169277.

=== Anthologies ===
- Geoffrey C. Ward; Robert Atwan, eds. (1996). Best American Essays 1996. Houghton Mifflin. ISBN 978-0-395-71757-8.
- George Miller, ed. (2000). "Caught in the Widow's Web". The Prentice Hall Reader. University Press of Mississippi. ISBN 978-0-13-022563-4.
- Natalie Angier; Tim Folger, eds. (2002). The Best American Science and Nature Writing 2002. Houghton Mifflin Co. ISBN 978-0-618-08297-1.
- Kelly A Harmon and Vonnie Winslow Crist, eds. (2019) Not Far from Roswell. Pole to Pole Publishing. ISBN 1941559360
- Lisa Vasquez, ed. (2017) Unleashed: Monsters vs. Zombies Vol. II. Stitched Smile Publications. ASIN B0764MDWL3.
- Anna Reith, ed. (2017) Restless: An Anthology. Frith Books. ISBN 1521888795.
