= Adams, Oklahoma =

- Unincorporated community
- Location within the state of Oklahoma Adams, Oklahoma (the United States)
- Coordinates: 36°45′23″N 101°4′38″W
- Country: United States
- State: Oklahoma
- County: Texas

Area
  - Total: 0.51 sq mi (1.31 km^{2})
  - Land: 0.51 sq mi (1.31 km^{2})
  - Water: 0 sq mi (0.00 km^{2})
- Elevation: 2,841 ft (866 m)

Population (2020)
  - Total: 148
  - Density: 293.3/sq mi (113.26/km^{2})
- Time zone: UTC-6 (Central (CST))
  - Summer (DST): UTC-5 (CDT)
- ZIP codes: 73901
- Area code: 580
- FIPS code: 40-00300

Adams is an unincorporated community in eastern Texas County, Oklahoma, United States. The population was 148 at the time of the 2020 census. It is approximately 20 miles (32 km) east-northeast of the county seat, Guymon. The community is six miles north-northeast of Optima Lake.

== History ==
The post office opened June 14, 1930. The community was named for Jesse L. Adams, an engineer for the Rock Island Railroad.

Adams was the site of the Adams Woodframe Grain Elevator, which was listed on the National Register of Historic Places (NRHP). The community and its elevator were both established in 1926. The elevator was unusable from the 1980s, and was condemned because of the danger of its collapse. It was then burned down in 2018.

== Demographics ==
Historical population
| Census | Pop. | Note | %± |
|---|---|---|---|
| 2020 | 148 | | — |
U.S. Decennial Census

=== 2020 census ===
As of the 2020 census, Adams had a population of 148. The median age was 28.7 years. 35.8% of residents were under the age of 18 and 7.4% of residents were 65 years of age or older. For every 100 females there were 94.7 males, and for every 100 females age 18 and over there were 93.9 males age 18 and over.

0% of residents lived in urban areas, while 100.0% lived in rural areas.

There were 56 households in Adams, of which 25.0% had children under the age of 18 living in them. Of all households, 62.5% were married-couple households, 16.1% were households with a male householder and no spouse or partner present, and 17.9% were households with a female householder and no spouse or partner present. About 26.8% of all households were made up of individuals and 21.4% had someone living alone who was 65 years of age or older.

There were 58 housing units, of which 3.4% were vacant. The homeowner vacancy rate was 0% and the rental vacancy rate was 0%.

Racial composition as of the 2020 census
| Race | Number | Percent |
|---|---|---|
| White | 76 | 51.4% |
| Black or African American | 0 | 0% |
| American Indian and Alaska Native | 2 | 1.4% |
| Asian | 0 | 0% |
| Native Hawaiian and Other Pacific Islander | 0 | 0% |
| Some other race | 47 | 31.8% |
| Two or more races | 23 | 15.5% |
| Hispanic or Latino (of any race) | 102 | 68.9% |

== Education ==
It is in the Hooker Public Schools school district.
