= KBIJ =

- Guymon, Oklahoma; United States
- Broadcast area: Oklahoma Panhandle and northern Texas Panhandle
- Frequency: 99.5 MHz
- Branding: El Patron

Programming
- Language: Spanish
- Format: Regional Mexican

Ownership
- Owner: Oralia Cowan; (OMI Oilfield Investments, LLC)

History
- First air date: 2008
- Former call signs: KRBG (2006–2008)

Technical information
- Licensing authority: FCC
- Facility ID: 164274
- Class: C1
- ERP: 100,000 watts
- HAAT: 82 meters (269 feet)
- Transmitter coordinates: 36°50′42″N 101°12′15″W

Links
- Public license information: Public file; LMS

KBIJ (99.5 FM) is an American radio station licensed to serve the community of Guymon, Oklahoma. The station is owned by Oralia Cowan, through licensee OMI Oilfield Investments, LLC. It airs a Regional Mexican format to the far northern Perryton, Texas.

== History ==
In December 2004, Todd Deneui applied to the Federal Communications Commission (FCC) for a construction permit for a new broadcast radio station. The FCC granted this permit on March 2, 2005, with a scheduled expiration date of March 2, 2008.

In June 2006, permit holder Todd Deneui applied to the FCC to sell the construction permit to Grace Community Church of Amarillo for $95,000. The FCC approved the move on July 31, 2006, and the transaction was formally consummated on August 16, 2006.

With new ownership in place, the new station was assigned call sign "KRBG" on October 11, 2006. After construction and testing were completed in February 2008, the station was granted its broadcast license on March 10, 2008. On October 1, 2008, the station changed to the current call sign of "KBIJ".

Grace Community Church of Amarillo sold the station to Oralia Cowan's OMI Oilfield Investments, LLC for $421,000; the sale was consummated on July 23, 2013.
