= KKBS =

Radio station in Guymon, Oklahoma

- Guymon, Oklahoma; United States
- Broadcast area: SW Kansas; Oklahoma Panhandle
- Frequency: 92.7 MHz
- Branding: The Boss

Programming
- Format: Active Rock

Ownership
- Owner: Mls Communications, Inc.

History
- First air date: 1983
- Call sign meaning: The Boss

Technical information
- Licensing authority: FCC
- Facility ID: 43279
- Class: C3
- ERP: 11,500 watts
- HAAT: 148 meters (486 ft)
- Transmitter coordinates: 36°40′13″N 101°28′48″W
- Translators: 100.5 K263AQ (Liberal, KS)

Links
- Public license information: Public file; LMS
- Webcast: Listen live
- Website: kkbs.com

KKBS (92.7 FM) is a radio station broadcasting an Active Rock format. Licensed to Guymon, Oklahoma, United States, the station serves the SW Kansas area. The station is currently owned by Mls Communications, Inc.

== Translators ==
In addition to the main station, KKBS is relayed by an additional translator to widen its broadcast area.

Broadcast translator for KKBS
Call sign	Frequency	City of license	FID	ERP (W)	Class	FCC info
K263AQ	100.5 FM	Liberal, Kansas	139620	250	D	LMS
