= Guymon Municipal Airport =

- IATA: GUY; ICAO: KGUY; FAA LID: GUY

Summary
- Airport type: Public
- Owner: City of Guymon
- Serves: Guymon, Oklahoma
- Elevation AMSL: 3,123 ft (952 m)
- Coordinates: 36°41′06″N 101°30′28″W
- Interactive map of Guymon Municipal Airport

Runways
Direction	Length		Surface
Direction	ft	m	Surface
18/36	5,900	1,798	Asphalt
6/24	1,795	547	Turf

Statistics (2009)
- Aircraft operations: 17,275
- Based aircraft: 33
- Source: Federal Aviation Administration

Guymon Municipal Airport (IATA: GUY, ICAO: KGUY, FAA LID: GUY) is in Texas County, Oklahoma, two miles west of Guymon, which owns it. The FAA's National Plan of Integrated Airport Systems for 2021-2025 classifies it as a general aviation airport.

From about 1957 until 1968 Central Airlines and successor Frontier Airlines stopped here.

== Facilities ==
Guymon Municipal Airport covers 480 acres (190 ha) at an elevation of 3,123 feet (952 m). It has two runways: 18/36 is 5,900 by 100 feet (1,798 x 30 m) asphalt and 6/24 is 1,795 by 200 feet (547 x 61 m) turf.

The airport averaged 53 operations per day for the 12-month period ending November 29, 2019, with 52% local general aviation, 42% transient general aviation, 6% air taxi, and less than 1% military. 31 aircraft were then based at the airport: 25 single-engine and 6 multi-engine.

The airport sees scheduled cargo Cessna Caravans from Martinaire operating as a UPS feeder carrier.

== See also ==
- List of airports in Oklahoma
