= Franklin Hall (Goodwell, Oklahoma) =

- U.S. National Register of Historic Places
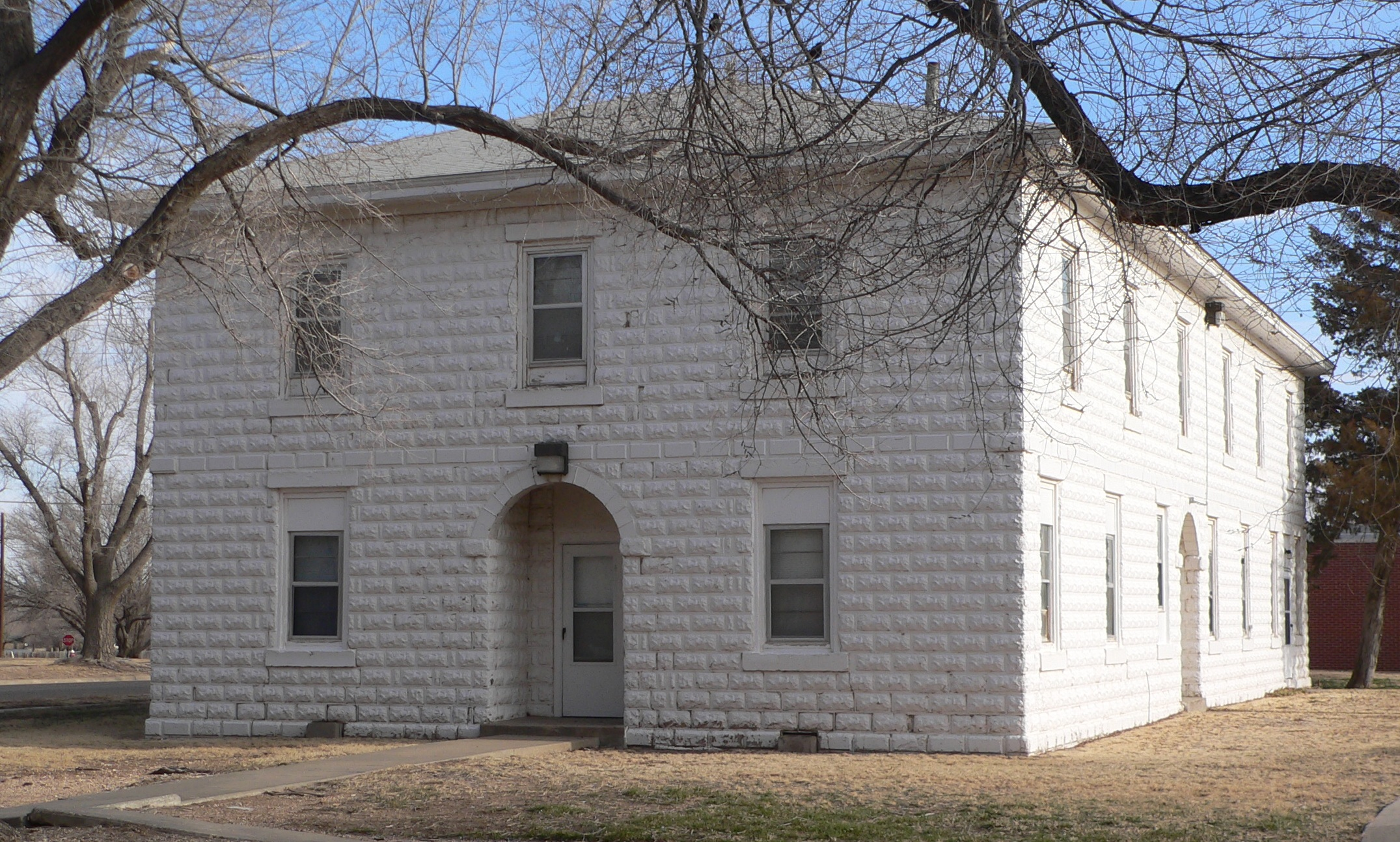
- Franklin Hall, in 2012, seen from the southwest. The building's long axis is oriented southwest-northeast.

- Location within Oklahoma Location within the United States
- Location: 201 N. College Ave., Goodwell, Oklahoma
- Coordinates: 36°35′39″N 101°38′9″W
- Built: 1909-10
- Built by: Frank Shinville
- NRHP reference No.: 07000909
- Added to NRHP: September 6, 2007

Franklin Hall in Goodwell, Oklahoma, USA, built during 1909-10 by a local contractor, has been used in various ways for housing throughout its history. It was listed on the National Register of Historic Places listings in Texas County, Oklahoma in 2007 with the alternate name Girls' Dormitory/Boys' Dormitory.

It is a 37 feet (11 m) by 80 feet (24 m) concrete building with a moderately sloped hipped asphalt roof, and has no particular architectural style. It was built, along with two church buildings, in an effort to get the state legislature's approval for an agricultural high school to be located in Goodwell. The school was approved and was named the "Panhandle Agricultural Institute", later renamed to "Panhandle Agriculture and Mechanical College" and eventually in 1974, to Oklahoma Panhandle State University.

Originally the building housed students, faculty, and the president of the school and his family. It soon became the Girls' Dormitory, with males housed in tents nearby. In 1914 a second residential building, also named the Girls' Dormitory and later named Earle Hall, was built and housed the females plus the president and family. The Franklin Hall building became the Boys' Dormitory and was renamed to Franklin Hall in the mid-1920s. After World War II, it was converted into 12 apartments for married students, and occasionally faculty. Eventually it became housing for honor students. Building code deficiencies led to the building being mostly vacant from 2004 to the time of its NRHP nomination in 2007.

The building was deemed significant for its association with higher education. It is the only building surviving from the time of the school's founding.
