= Goodwell, Oklahoma =

City in Texas County, Oklahoma, U.S.

- Town
- Location in Texas County and Oklahoma.
- Coordinates: 36°35′36″N 101°37′47″W
- Country: United States
- State: Oklahoma
- County: Texas

Area
  - Total: 2.22 sq mi (5.75 km^{2})
  - Land: 2.20 sq mi (5.69 km^{2})
  - Water: 0.023 sq mi (0.06 km^{2})
- Elevation: 3,304 ft (1,007 m)

Population (2020)
  - Total: 951
  - Density: 433/sq mi (167.1/km^{2})
- Time zone: UTC-6 (Central (CST))
  - Summer (DST): UTC-5 (CDT)
- ZIP code: 73939
- Area code: 580
- FIPS code: 40-30200
- GNIS ID: 1093259

Goodwell is a town in Texas County, Oklahoma, United States. As of the 2020 census, the town's population was 951. Goodwell is home to Oklahoma Panhandle State University.

== History ==
In 1901, Goodwell was established as a switch along the Chicago and Rock Island Railroad. The switch was named Goodwell because a "good well" was found there. In 1903, Goodwell was established and celebrated its centennial in 2003.

In 1909, the Pan-Handle Agricultural Institute was established in Goodwell. Its name was changed to Panhandle Agricultural and Mechanical College (PAMC) in 1921, then to Oklahoma Panhandle State College of Agriculture and Applied Science in 1967, then to its current name of Oklahoma Panhandle State University in 1974.

The No Man's Land Museum was established in 1932 as a project of the science department at Panhandle Agricultural and Mechanical College. In 1933, the No Man's Land Historical Society was established and took control of the museum.

On June 24, 2012, two Union Pacific trains collided head-on and caught on fire about 1 mile (1.6 km) east of Goodwell. Three Union Pacific employees on the two trains died. One survivor of the crash escaped injury by leaping from the train when he saw a crash was imminent. The Union Pacific continues to provide rail freight service to the town.

== Geography ==
Goodwell is located at 36.5933°N 101.6297°W. According to the United States Census Bureau, the town has a total area of 1.2 square miles (3.1 km^{2}), all land.

=== Climate ===
According to the Köppen Climate Classification system, Goodwell has a cold semi-arid climate, abbreviated "BSk" on climate maps. The hottest temperature recorded in Goodwell was 112 °F (44.4 °C) on June 27, 2011, while the coldest temperature recorded was −22 °F (−30.0 °C) on January 4, 1959.

Climate data for Goodwell, Oklahoma, 1991–2020 normals, extremes 1910–present
Month	Jan	Feb	Mar	Apr	May	Jun	Jul	Aug	Sep	Oct	Nov	Dec	Year
Record high °F (°C)	83 (28)	90 (32)	102 (39)	100 (38)	104 (40)	112 (44)	110 (43)	109 (43)	109 (43)	100 (38)	89 (32)	86 (30)	112 (44)
Mean maximum °F (°C)	72.2 (22.3)	76.8 (24.9)	84.4 (29.1)	89.5 (31.9)	95.5 (35.3)	102.8 (39.3)	104.3 (40.2)	102.2 (39.0)	98.7 (37.1)	92.2 (33.4)	80.1 (26.7)	71.9 (22.2)	105.9 (41.1)
Mean daily maximum °F (°C)	48.6 (9.2)	52.2 (11.2)	61.0 (16.1)	69.2 (20.7)	78.6 (25.9)	89.0 (31.7)	93.0 (33.9)	91.0 (32.8)	83.8 (28.8)	72.1 (22.3)	59.4 (15.2)	48.6 (9.2)	70.5 (21.4)
Daily mean °F (°C)	34.4 (1.3)	37.3 (2.9)	45.8 (7.7)	54.0 (12.2)	64.0 (17.8)	74.4 (23.6)	78.7 (25.9)	76.8 (24.9)	69.2 (20.7)	56.6 (13.7)	44.6 (7.0)	34.8 (1.6)	55.9 (13.3)
Mean daily minimum °F (°C)	20.1 (−6.6)	22.4 (−5.3)	30.5 (−0.8)	38.8 (3.8)	49.4 (9.7)	59.8 (15.4)	64.3 (17.9)	62.7 (17.1)	54.5 (12.5)	41.2 (5.1)	29.8 (−1.2)	21.1 (−6.1)	41.2 (5.1)
Mean minimum °F (°C)	3.9 (−15.6)	7.4 (−13.7)	13.2 (−10.4)	24.1 (−4.4)	35.4 (1.9)	48.6 (9.2)	55.9 (13.3)	54.2 (12.3)	41.1 (5.1)	25.4 (−3.7)	13.2 (−10.4)	4.3 (−15.4)	−1.4 (−18.6)
Record low °F (°C)	−22 (−30)	−19 (−28)	−9 (−23)	8 (−13)	24 (−4)	38 (3)	41 (5)	40 (4)	28 (−2)	10 (−12)	−5 (−21)	−16 (−27)	−22 (−30)
Average precipitation inches (mm)	0.38 (9.7)	0.32 (8.1)	1.10 (28)	1.45 (37)	1.92 (49)	2.39 (61)	2.58 (66)	2.59 (66)	1.34 (34)	1.69 (43)	0.37 (9.4)	0.61 (15)	16.74 (426.2)
Average snowfall inches (cm)	0.9 (2.3)	0.1 (0.25)	0.9 (2.3)	0.0 (0.0)	0.0 (0.0)	0.0 (0.0)	0.0 (0.0)	0.0 (0.0)	0.0 (0.0)	0.0 (0.0)	0.0 (0.0)	0.8 (2.0)	2.7 (6.85)
Average precipitation days (≥ 0.01 in)	2.5	2.6	4.2	4.9	5.9	6.8	6.6	7.2	4.1	3.9	2.3	2.9	53.9
Average snowy days (≥ 0.1 in)	0.2	0.2	0.2	0.0	0.0	0.0	0.0	0.0	0.0	0.0	0.0	0.3	0.9
Source 1: NOAA
Source 2: National Weather Service

== Demographics ==
Historical population
Census	Pop.	Note	%±
1930	501		—
1940	360		−28.1%
1950	714		98.3%
1960	771		8.0%
1970	1,467		90.3%
1980	1,186		−19.2%
1990	1,065		−10.2%
2000	1,192		11.9%
2010	1,293		8.5%
2020	951		−26.5%
U.S. Decennial Census

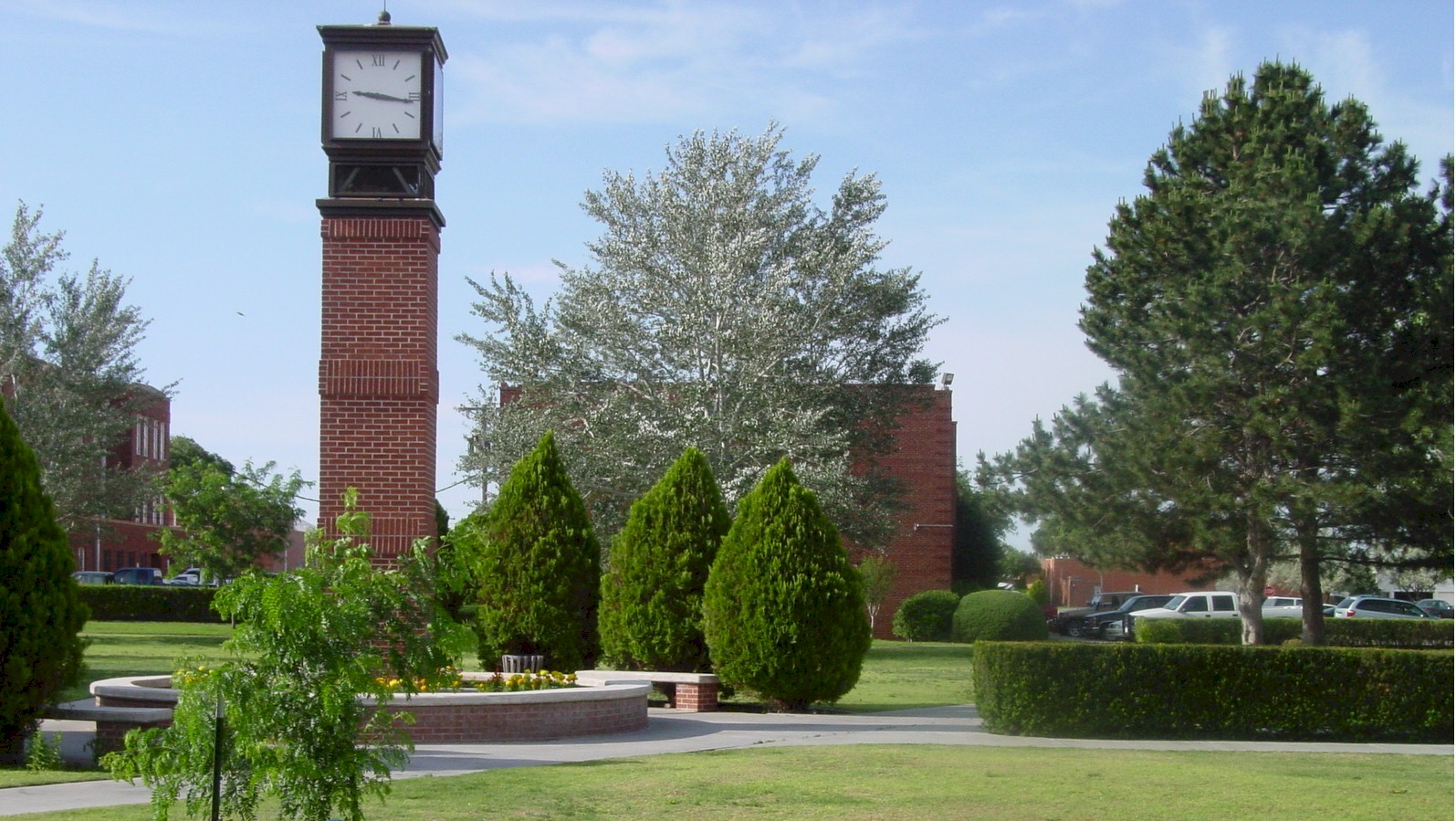
Oklahoma Panhandle State University, 2006

=== 2020 census ===
As of the 2020 census, Goodwell had a population of 951. The median age was 22.6 years. 16.9% of residents were under the age of 18 and 10.0% of residents were 65 years of age or older. For every 100 females there were 121.7 males, and for every 100 females age 18 and over there were 125.7 males age 18 and over.

0.0% of residents lived in urban areas, while 100.0% lived in rural areas.

There were 310 households in Goodwell, of which 34.8% had children under the age of 18 living in them. Of all households, 41.9% were married-couple households, 24.8% were households with a male householder and no spouse or partner present, and 26.5% were households with a female householder and no spouse or partner present. About 30.0% of all households were made up of individuals and 7.7% had someone living alone who was 65 years of age or older.

There were 429 housing units, of which 27.7% were vacant. The homeowner vacancy rate was 3.4% and the rental vacancy rate was 20.2%.

Racial composition as of the 2020 census
Race	Number	Percent
White	664	69.8%
Black or African American	88	9.3%
American Indian and Alaska Native	31	3.3%
Asian	15	1.6%
Native Hawaiian and Other Pacific Islander	0	0.0%
Some other race	68	7.2%
Two or more races	85	8.9%
Hispanic or Latino (of any race)	220	23.1%

=== 2010 census ===
As of the 2010 census Goodwell had a population of 1293. The racial and ethnic composition of the population was 70.6% non-Hispanic white, 8.2% African American, 2.2% Native American, 0.2% Asian, 0.1% Hawaiian Native, 3.1% reporting two or more races and 17.5% Hispanic or Latino.

=== 2000 census ===
As of the census of 2000, there were 1,192 people, 407 households, and 221 families residing in the town. The population density was 1,003.8 inhabitants per square mile (387.6/km^{2}). There were 478 housing units at an average density of 402.5 per square mile (155.4/km^{2}). The racial makeup of the town was 87.84% White, 3.27% African American, 2.10% Native American, 0.92% Asian, 0.08% Pacific Islander, 4.53% from other races, and 1.26% from two or more races. 8.64% of the population were Hispanic or Latino of any race.

There were 407 households, out of which 30.0% had children under the age of 18 living with them, 42.8% were married couples living together, 8.4% had a female householder with no husband present, and 45.7% were non-families. 26.8% of all households were made up of individuals, and 2.9% had someone living alone who was 65 years of age or older. The average household size was 2.32 and the average family size was 2.93.

In the town, the population was spread out, with 17.5% under the age of 18, 46.1% from 18 to 24, 21.1% from 25 to 44, 11.7% from 45 to 64, and 3.6% who were 65 years of age or older. The median age was 22 years. For every 100 females, there were 114.4 males. For every 100 females age 18 and over, there were 120.4 males.

The median income for a household in the town was $29,583, and the median income for a family was $42,708. Males had a median income of $24,000 versus $20,750 for females. The per capita income for the town was $12,531. 26.6% of the population and 18.1% of families were below the poverty line. Out of the total population, 32.2% of those under the age of 18 and 6.8% of those 65 and older were living below the poverty line.

== Education ==
It is in the Goodwell Public Schools school district.

== See also ==
- National Register of Historic Places listings in Texas County, Oklahoma
  - Franklin Hall
