= Texas County Courthouse =

- U.S. National Register of Historic Places
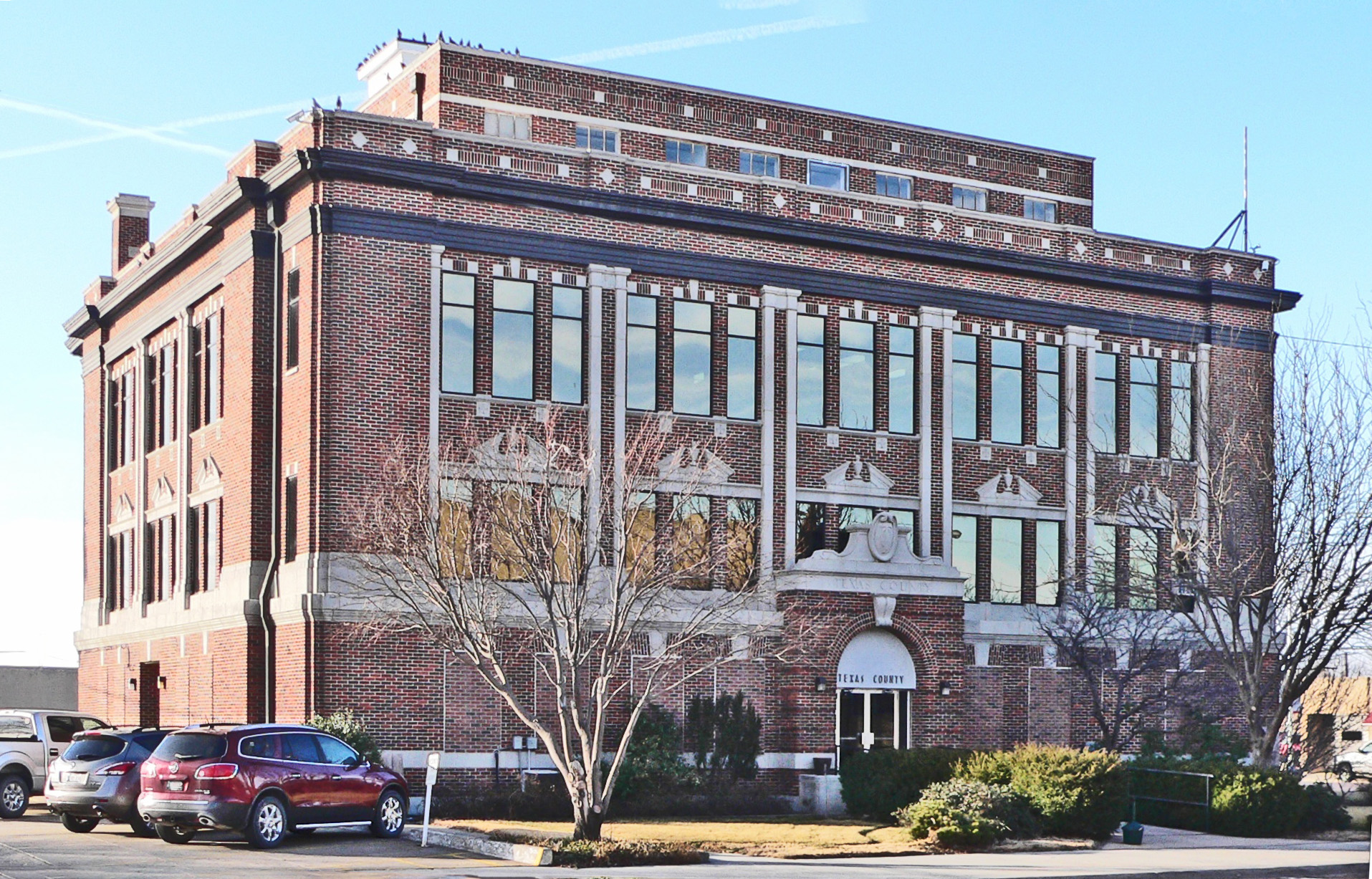
- The Texas County Courthouse from the northeast

- Location within Oklahoma Location within the United States
- Interactive map showing the location of Texas County Courthouse
- Location: 319 N. Main St., Guymon, Oklahoma
- Coordinates: 36°40′56″N 101°28′50″W
- Area: 1 acre (0.40 ha)
- Built: 1927
- Built by: Kriepke Construction Co.
- Architect: Maurice Jaynes
- Architectural style: Late 19th And 20th Century Revivals
- MPS: County Courthouses of Oklahoma TR
- NRHP reference No.: 84003439
- Added to NRHP: August 24, 1984

The Texas County Courthouse is the historic courthouse serving Texas County, Oklahoma, located in the city of Guymon. The building is a four-story, red-brick structure; its fourth floor once functioned as a jail. The courthouse was designed by Maurice Jaynes using classical styles and built by the Kriepke Construction Co., a prominent builder in Oklahoma, for $200,000. Opened in 1927, the courthouse received praise from local newspapers in its first decade and came to symbolize the success and growth of the Oklahoma Panhandle. On August 24, 1984, the courthouse was added to the National Register of Historic Places.
