= Hooker Woodframe Grain Elevator =

- U.S. National Register of Historic Places
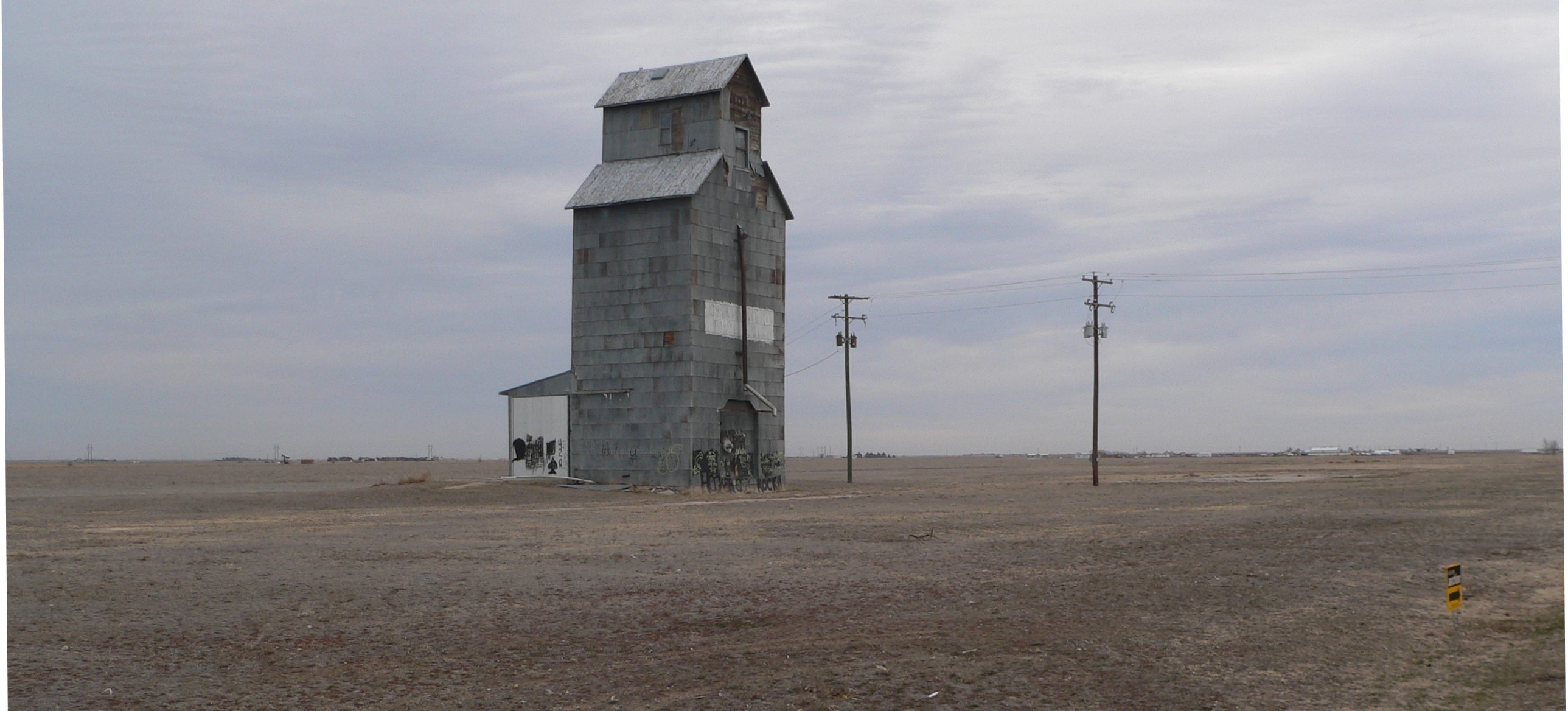
- The Hooker Woodframe Grain Elevator from the southwest

- Location within Oklahoma Location within the United States
- Location: Off Texas Ave., Hooker, Oklahoma
- Coordinates: 36°52′3″N 101°12′39″W
- Area: less than one acre
- Built: 1926
- Built by: Riffe & Gilmore Co.
- MPS: Woodframe Grain Elevators of Oklahoma Panhandle TR
- NRHP reference No.: 83002133
- Added to NRHP: May 13, 1983

The Hooker Woodframe Grain Elevator is a grain elevator in Hooker, Oklahoma. The elevator was built in 1926 by the Riffe & Gilmore Co. and operated by the Wheat Pool Elevator Company. Located along the Beaver, Meade and Englewood Railroad, which ran from the east at Beaver, Oklahoma to the west at Keyes, Oklahoma (northeast of Boise City), the elevator served the local wheat industry. It was one of several built to compete with the Chicago, Rock Island and Pacific Railroad elevators in the region. The elevator was added to the National Register of Historic Places on May 13, 1983 and is one of two National Register of Historic Places listings in Texas County, Oklahoma located around Hooker.
