= Optima, Oklahoma =

- Town
- Location in Texas County and state of Oklahoma.
- Coordinates: 36°45′30″N 101°21′23″W
- Country: United States
- State: Oklahoma
- County: Texas

Area
  - Total: 0.53 sq mi (1.38 km^{2})
  - Land: 0.53 sq mi (1.38 km^{2})
  - Water: 0 sq mi (0.00 km^{2})
- Elevation: 3,022 ft (921 m)

Population (2020)
  - Total: 338
  - Density: 634.7/sq mi (245.05/km^{2})
- Time zone: UTC-6 (Central (CST))
  - Summer (DST): UTC-5 (CDT)
- ZIP code: 73945
- Area code: 580
- FIPS code: 40-55850

Optima is a town in Texas County, Oklahoma, United States. As of the 2020 census, the town’s population was 338.

== Geography ==
Optima is located approximately nine miles northeast of Guymon on U.S. Route 54 in the Oklahoma Panhandle. The course of the Beaver River runs about two miles south of the community and enters Optima Lake about nine miles to the southeast. It is on the route of the Union Pacific Railroad.

According to the United States Census Bureau, the town has a total area of 0.4 square miles (1.0 km^{2}), all land.

== Demographics ==
Historical population
Census	Pop.	Note	%±
1930	115		—
1940	69		−40.0%
1950	97		40.6%
1960	64		−34.0%
1970	103		60.9%
1980	133		29.1%
1990	92		−30.8%
2000	266		189.1%
2010	356		33.8%
2020	338		−5.1%
U.S. Decennial Census

=== 2020 census ===
As of the 2020 census, Optima had a population of 338. The median age was 27.5 years. 31.4% of residents were under the age of 18 and 5.0% of residents were 65 years of age or older. For every 100 females there were 107.4 males, and for every 100 females age 18 and over there were 110.9 males age 18 and over.

0.0% of residents lived in urban areas, while 100.0% lived in rural areas.

There were 103 households in Optima, of which 60.2% had children under the age of 18 living in them. Of all households, 56.3% were married-couple households, 14.6% were households with a male householder and no spouse or partner present, and 16.5% were households with a female householder and no spouse or partner present. About 5.8% of all households were made up of individuals and 3.8% had someone living alone who was 65 years of age or older.

There were 119 housing units, of which 13.4% were vacant. The homeowner vacancy rate was 0.0% and the rental vacancy rate was 11.6%.

Racial composition as of the 2020 census
Race	Number	Percent
White	82	24.3%
Black or African American	0	0.0%
American Indian and Alaska Native	3	0.9%
Asian	1	0.3%
Native Hawaiian and Other Pacific Islander	0	0.0%
Some other race	197	58.3%
Two or more races	55	16.3%
Hispanic or Latino (of any race)	263	77.8%

=== 2010 ===
As of the 2010 census Optima had a population of 356. The ethnic makeup of the population was 76.1% Hispanic, 20.2% non-Hispanic white, 1.4% Native American and 4.8% reporting two or more race.

As of 2010, the Hispanic population is 76.1% - 66.3% Mexican, 0.3% Colombian, 0.3% Cuban.

=== 2000 ===
As of the census of 2000, there were 266 people, 78 households, and 64 families residing in the town. The population density was 616.6 inhabitants per square mile (238.1/km^{2}). There were 97 housing units at an average density of 224.8 per square mile (86.8/km^{2}). The racial makeup of the town was 79.32% White, 0.75% African American, 0.38% Native American, 0.75% Asian, 13.53% from other races, and 5.26% from two or more races. Hispanic or Latino of any race were 48.12% of the population.

There were 78 households, out of which 56.4% had children under the age of 18 living with them, 73.1% were married couples living together, and 17.9% were non-families. 16.7% of all households were made up of individuals, and 2.6% had someone living alone who was 65 years of age or older. The average household size was 3.41 and the average family size was 3.84.

In the town, the population was spread out, with 39.5% under the age of 18, 11.3% from 18 to 24, 32.3% from 25 to 44, 12.4% from 45 to 64, and 4.5% who were 65 years of age or older. The median age was 25 years. For every 100 females, there were 116.3 males. For every 100 females age 18 and over, there were 120.5 males.

The median income for a household in the town was $36,094, and the median income for a family was $40,833. Males had a median income of $28,750 versus $21,667 for females. The per capita income for the town was $12,388. About 11.4% of families and 11.9% of the population were below the poverty line, including 11.0% of those under the age of 18 and none of those 65 or over.

== Education ==
It is in the Optima Public School school district, an elementary school district.
