= Adams Woodframe Grain Elevator =

- U.S. National Register of Historic Places
- Location within Oklahoma Location within the United States
- Location: N of OK 3, Adams, Oklahoma
- Coordinates: 36°45′26″N 101°4′22″W
- Area: less than one acre
- Built: 1926
- Built by: Tex-Co Grain Company
- MPS: Woodframe Grain Elevators of Oklahoma Panhandle TR
- NRHP reference No.: 83002129
- Added to NRHP: May 13, 1983

The Adams Woodframe Grain Elevator is a grain elevator in Adams, Oklahoma. The elevator was built in 1926, the same year the community of Adams was established by the Tex-Co Grain Company. The Chicago, Rock Island and Pacific Railroad (Rock Island) opened a line past the grain elevator in 1929, which linked Amarillo, Texas to Liberal, Kansas. The elevator has mainly held wheat, the primary crop in the area, and operated continuously from its opening to at least 1983. The grain was shipped by railroad from Adams to markets in either Fort Worth, Texas or Galveston, Texas On May 13, 1983, the elevator was added to the National Register of Historic Places. It was burned down around August 22, 2018 because of safety issues.

== Description ==
The building is approximately 25 feet (7.6 m) square by 70 feet (21 m) high. It has a wood frame and is covered with corrugated metal siding, which is attached to horizontal wood support beams that run from grade level to the gable roof line. The roof is also covered with corrugated sheet metal. The east side faces the railroad track and has a single door entrance at grade. There is a loading spout and two windows, one above the other, in the loft. Two one-story sheds are attached to the south elevation. The smaller shed has a double sliding door and was used for storing equipment. The larger has a double, swinging door, and leads into the area where grain was unloaded from wagons and trucks. (Note: Two sets of windows on the south elevation had been boarded over by the time the NRHP application was prepared.) The west elevation looks like the east, except that it has no loading spout. The north elevation has a double, sliding exit door and four windows (two pairs, one above the other).

== Gradual destruction ==
In 2017, a news story reported that the old grain elevator has developed a noticeable lean toward the north, because of the prairie wind. Apparently this has occurred since the 1980s, when the Rock Island removed its track and a grain truck fell through the elevator floor. The structure is officially condemned as of 2017. (Note: Apparently, there are no plans to prop up the derelict structure before it falls of its own accord.) It was burned down about August 22, 2018.
