= Texas County, Oklahoma =

County in Oklahoma, United States

- County
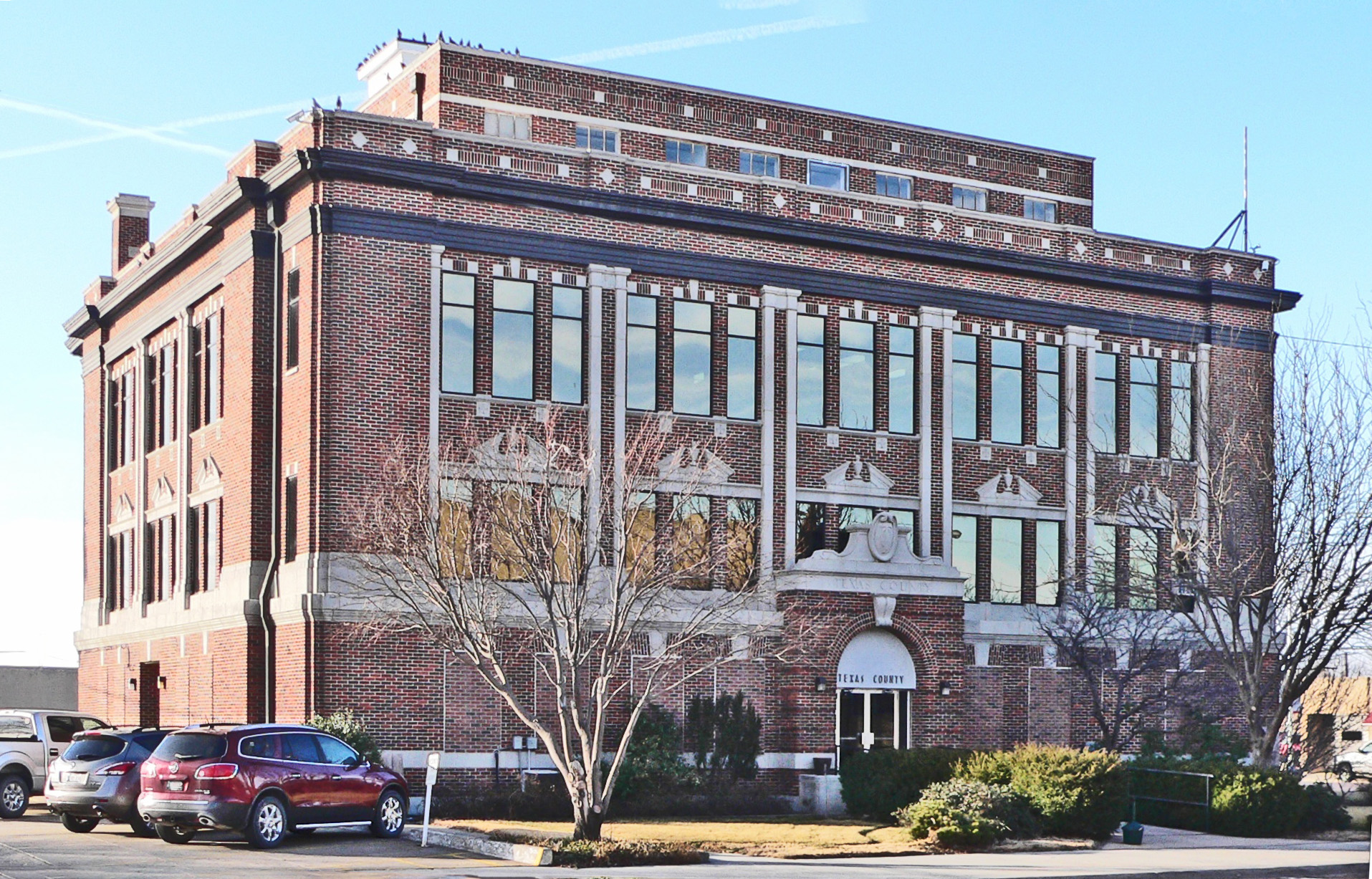
- Texas County Courthouse in Guymon (2012)

- Location within the U.S. state of Oklahoma
- Coordinates: 36°45′N 101°29′W
- Country: United States
- State: Oklahoma
- Founded: 1907
- Named for: Texas
- Seat: Guymon
- Largest city: Guymon

Area
  - Total: 2,049 sq mi (5,310 km^{2})
  - Land: 2,041 sq mi (5,290 km^{2})
  - Water: 7.4 sq mi (19 km^{2}) 0.4%

Population (2020)
  - Total: 21,384
  - Estimate (2025): 20,322 ▼
  - Density: 10.48/sq mi (4.045/km^{2})
- Time zone: UTC−6 (Central)
  - Summer (DST): UTC−5 (CDT)
- Congressional district: 3rd
- Website: texas.okcounties.org

Texas County is a county located in the panhandle of the U.S. state of Oklahoma. Its county seat is Guymon. As of the 2020 census, the population was 21,384. It is the second largest county in Oklahoma, based on land area, and is named for Texas, the state that adjoins the county to its south. Texas County comprises the Guymon, OK Micropolitan Statistical Area. The county economy is largely based on farming and cattle production. It is one of the top-producing counties in the U.S. for wheat, cattle, and hogs. It also lies within the noted Hugoton-Panhandle natural gas field.

Being 50.6% Hispanic, Texas is also Oklahoma's only Hispanic-majority county as of 2020.

== History ==
Texas County was formed at Oklahoma statehood (November 16, 1907) from the central one-third of "Old Beaver County". When the formation of the county was authorized by the Constitutional Convention of 1907, the county was so named because it was wholly included within the limits of the Texas Cession of 1850, whereby the ownership of the area was passed from the State of Texas to the United States government. From 1850 to 1890, its lands were never attached to any state or territory, never surveyed, and never divided into townships and sections like the eastern counties were. From 1890 to 1907, it was part of Beaver County.

== Geography ==
According to the U.S. Census Bureau, the county has a total area of 2,049 square miles (5,310 km^{2}), of which 2,041 square miles (5,290 km^{2}) are land and 7.4 square miles (19 km^{2}) (0.4%) is water. It is the second-largest county in Oklahoma by area. The county lies in the High Plains of the Great Plains physiographic region. It is generally flat, but has some rolling hills. It is drained by the North Canadian River, often called the Beaver River in this area. Tributaries of the river are Coldwater, Hackberry, Goff, Teepee, and Pony Creeks.

For tourism purposes, the county's location in Northwest Oklahoma puts it in the area designated by the Oklahoma Department of Tourism as Red Carpet Country.

The Optima Lake project, including Optima National Wildlife Refuge, and the Optima Wildlife Management Area being public hunting lands managed by the Oklahoma Department of Wildlife Conservation, is 2 miles (3.2 km) north of Hardesty, Oklahoma.

=== Adjacent counties ===
- Stevens County, Kansas (north)
- Seward County, Kansas (northeast)
- Beaver County (east)
- Ochiltree County, Texas (southeast)
- Hansford County, Texas (south)
- Sherman County, Texas (southwest)
- Cimarron County (west)
- Morton County, Kansas (northwest)

Texas County is one of four counties in the United States to border the state with which it shares its name (the other three are Nevada County, California, Delaware County, Pennsylvania, and Ohio County, West Virginia).

=== National protected area ===
- Optima National Wildlife Refuge

== Demographics ==
Historical population
Census	Pop.	Note	%±
1910	14,249		—
1920	13,975		−1.9%
1930	14,100		0.9%
1940	9,896		−29.8%
1950	14,235		43.8%
1960	14,162		−0.5%
1970	16,352		15.5%
1980	17,727		8.4%
1990	16,419		−7.4%
2000	20,107		22.5%
2010	20,640		2.7%
2020	21,384		3.6%
2025 (est.)	20,322	▼	−5.0%
U.S. Decennial Census; 1790–1960 1900–1990; 1990–2000 2010

=== 2020 census ===
As of the 2020 census, the county had a population of 21,384. Of the residents, 29.3% were under the age of 18 and 12.2% were 65 years of age or older; the median age was 32.4 years. For every 100 females there were 104.9 males, and for every 100 females age 18 and over there were 106.9 males.

The racial makeup of the county was 47.4% White, 4.8% Black or African American, 2.6% American Indian and Alaska Native, 2.2% Asian, 26.2% from some other race, and 16.8% from two or more races. Hispanic or Latino residents of any race comprised 50.6% of the population.

There were 7,376 households in the county, of which 40.4% had children under the age of 18 living with them and 23.0% had a female householder with no spouse or partner present. About 22.9% of all households were made up of individuals and 9.0% had someone living alone who was 65 years of age or older.

There were 8,443 housing units, of which 12.6% were vacant. Among occupied housing units, 60.9% were owner-occupied and 39.1% were renter-occupied. The homeowner vacancy rate was 1.9% and the rental vacancy rate was 9.0%.

=== 2010 census ===
As of the 2010 census, there were 20,640 people, 7,212 households, and 5,147 families residing in the county. The population density was 4/km^{2} (10/mi^{2}). There were 8,208 housing units at an average density of 2/km^{2} (5.2/mi^{2}). The racial makeup of the county was 75.7% White, 1.6% Black or African American, 1.3% Native American, 1.6% Asian, 0.2% Pacific Islander, 16.9% from other races, and 2.8% from two or more races. 42.0% of the population were Hispanic or Latino of any race (34.3% Mexican, 3.5% Guatemalan, 0.7% Cuban, 0.7% Spanish). 65.7% spoke English and 33.1% Spanish as their first language.

In 2010, there were 7,153 households, out of which 39.00% had children under the age of 18 living with them, 61.50% were married couples living together, 7.50% had a female householder with no husband present, and 26.60% were non-families. 21.20% of all households were made up of individuals, and 8.20% had someone living alone who was 65 years of age or older. The average household size was 2.75 and the average family size was 3.19. In the county, the population was spread out, with 28.80% under the age of 18, 12.70% from 18 to 24, 29.10% from 25 to 44, 19.20% from 45 to 64, and 10.20% who were 65 years of age or older. The median age was 30 years. For every 100 females there were 105.90 males. For every 100 females age 18 and over, there were 106.90 males.

The median income for a household in the county was $35,872, and the median income for a family was $42,226. Males had a median income of $26,991 versus $20,404 for females. The per capita income for the county was $15,692. About 10.20% of families and 14.10% of the population were below the poverty line, including 17.80% of those under age 18 and 7.40% of those age 65 or over.

== Politics ==
Voter Registration and Party Enrollment as of June 30, 2023
Party	Number of Voters	Percentage
Democratic	1,535	17.71%
Republican	5,423	62.57%
Others	1,709	19.72%
Total	8,667	100%

The county has been consistently Republican since 1952. No Democratic presidential candidate has received more than 20% of the vote in the 21st century.

Presidential election results

United States presidential election results for Texas County, Oklahoma
Year	Republican		Democratic		Third party(ies)	
Year	No.	%	No.	%	No.	%
1908	1,315	43.37%	1,470	48.48%	247	8.15%
1912	683	39.66%	764	44.37%	275	15.97%
1916	807	32.69%	1,349	54.64%	313	12.68%
1920	1,762	53.47%	1,398	42.43%	135	4.10%
1924	1,745	44.04%	1,812	45.73%	405	10.22%
1928	2,890	69.16%	1,240	29.67%	49	1.17%
1932	1,372	25.38%	4,033	74.62%	0	0.00%
1936	1,223	27.35%	3,229	72.22%	19	0.42%
1940	1,918	40.15%	2,831	59.26%	28	0.59%
1944	1,731	44.73%	2,119	54.75%	20	0.52%
1948	1,676	38.36%	2,693	61.64%	0	0.00%
1952	4,196	68.66%	1,915	31.34%	0	0.00%
1956	3,320	63.77%	1,886	36.23%	0	0.00%
1960	4,314	73.58%	1,549	26.42%	0	0.00%
1964	3,339	57.18%	2,500	42.82%	0	0.00%
1968	3,729	63.65%	1,176	20.07%	954	16.28%
1972	5,726	82.54%	924	13.32%	287	4.14%
1976	3,919	59.56%	2,591	39.38%	70	1.06%
1980	5,503	77.52%	1,451	20.44%	145	2.04%
1984	5,968	84.78%	1,033	14.68%	38	0.54%
1988	4,971	73.62%	1,717	25.43%	64	0.95%
1992	4,059	58.15%	1,487	21.30%	1,434	20.54%
1996	4,139	67.95%	1,408	23.12%	544	8.93%
2000	4,964	81.54%	1,084	17.81%	40	0.66%
2004	5,450	84.29%	1,016	15.71%	0	0.00%
2008	5,336	85.25%	923	14.75%	0	0.00%
2012	4,930	85.12%	862	14.88%	0	0.00%
2016	4,621	79.95%	858	14.84%	301	5.21%
2020	4,505	81.60%	894	16.19%	122	2.21%
2024	4,319	82.96%	793	15.23%	94	1.81%

== Economy ==
Area affected by 1930s Dust Bowl

Cattle raising was the most important economic activity before and after statehood. Farming rose in importance after the 1890s. Despite the occurrence of the Dust Bowl these two sectors have recovered and prospered. By 1990, Texas County led the state in producing grain sorghums, with 4.2 million bushels, or one-quarter of the state's harvest, and was the state's fourth-largest wheat-producing county, harvesting 10.3 million bushels. By 1997, it was the state's top producer of both hogs and cattle. Texas County was the fifth-ranked county in the entire nation in 2017 for the number of hogs produced (1,094,877), and pork producer Seaboard Foods is the county's primary employer.

Petroleum exploration began in 1922 and resulted in natural gas production from the Hugoton Gas Field. The county remains the nation's largest producer of natural gas. Four carbon black plants operated near Optima from the mid-1930s through the 1940s. The field extends from Hugoton, Kansas into the Texas Panhandle.

The 2000 MW Windcatcher wind farm project, consisting of 800 wind turbines from GE and a high voltage AC power line, was proposed for Texas County and adjacent Cimarron County, but ran into opposition and was finally cancelled in July 2018.

== Education ==
The Oklahoma Legislature created the Pan-Handle Agricultural Institute in 1909, offering secondary agricultural education for the Panhandle area. In 1921, the legislature changed the name to Panhandle Agricultural and Mechanical College and authorized the school to offer a two-year curriculum. In 1925, the State Board of Agriculture authorized upper division college courses; further, in 1926, junior and senior level courses were added. The school name has been changed twice since then, to Oklahoma Panhandle State College of Agriculture and Applied Science (OPSU) in 1967 and to Oklahoma Panhandle State University in 1974. The school is in Goodwell.

K-12 school districts include:

- Goodwell Public Schools
- Guymon Public Schools
- Hardesty Public Schools
- Hooker Public Schools
- Keyes Public Schools
- Texhoma Public Schools
- Turpin Public Schools
- Tyrone Public Schools
- Yarbrough Public Schools

There are two elementary school districts: Optima Public School and Straight Public School.

Residents of Texhoma Public Schools attend that district's schools and Texhoma Independent School District in Texas for different grade levels.

== Transportation ==
=== Major highways ===
- U.S. Highway 54
- U.S. Highway 56
- U.S. Highway 64
- U.S. Highway 412 / State Highway 3
- State Highway 94
- State Highway 95
- State Highway 136

=== Airports ===
Guymon Municipal Airport is a city-owned, public-use airport located two nautical miles (3.7 km) west of the central business district of City of Guymon in Texas County.

== Communities ==
=== Cities ===
- Guymon (county seat)
- Hooker

=== Towns ===
- Goodwell
- Hardesty
- Optima
- Texhoma (divided town with Texhoma, Texas)
- Tyrone

=== Census-designated places ===
- Adams
- Baker
- Hough

=== Unincorporated communities ===
- Eva
- Four Corners
- Mouser
- Muncy
- Straight
- Yarborough
- Hitchland (partially in Texas)
- Nabisco Township (no longer exists, 1910 census)

== NRHP sites ==
The following are included among the twenty-four sites in Texas County listed on the National Register of Historic Places

- Adams Woodframe Grain Elevator, Adams (since condemned and burned)
- Baker Woodframe Grain Elevator, Baker
- Eva Woodframe Grain Elevator, Eva
- Franklin Hall, Goodwell
- Easterwood Archeological Site, Guymon
- Hooker Woodframe Grain Elevator, Hooker
- Hough Woodframe Grain Elevator, Hough
- CCC Ranch Headquarters, Texhoma
- Johnson-Kline Archeological Site, Texhoma

== See also ==
- Oklahoma Panhandle
