= Hooker, Oklahoma =

- City
- Motto(s): It's a Location, not a Vocation
- Location in Texas County and Oklahoma
- Coordinates: 36°51′41″N 101°12′50″W
- Country: United States
- State: Oklahoma
- County: Texas

Government
  - Type: Mayor–Council

Area
  - Total: 1.11 sq mi (2.87 km^{2})
  - Land: 1.11 sq mi (2.87 km^{2})
  - Water: 0 sq mi (0.00 km^{2})
- Elevation: 2,990 ft (910 m)

Population (2020)
  - Total: 1,802
  - Density: 1,628.7/sq mi (628.86/km^{2})
- Time zone: UTC-6 (CST)
  - Summer (DST): UTC-5 (CDT)
- ZIP code: 73945
- Area code: 580
- FIPS code: 40-36000
- GNIS ID: 1093899
- Website: HookerOklahoma.net

Hooker is a city in Texas County, Oklahoma, United States. As of the 2020 census, the city’s population was 1,802. It is located approximately 20 miles northeast of Guymon on US Route 54 highway.

== Toponymy ==
The city name honors local cattle foreman John “Hooker” Threlkeld, who came to the area in 1873. It has frequently been noted on lists of unusual place names. The city's motto, referring to the alternative interpretation of its name, is "It's a location, not a vocation".

== History ==
In 1902, the Chicago, Rock Island and Pacific Railway laid tracks from Liberal, Kansas southwest through the Hooker area to Texhoma, Texas area. In 1904, the Chicago Townsite Company oversaw the organization and sale of town lots, and the city quickly grew. In 1927, the Beaver, Meade and Englewood Railroad (BM&E) built an east–west line to Hooker.

== Geography ==
Hooker is located at 36°51′41″N 101°12′50″W (36.861425, −101.213915). According to the United States Census Bureau, the city has a total area of 0.9 square miles (2.3 km^{2}), all land.

=== Climate ===
Climate data for Hooker, Oklahoma (1991–2020 normals, extremes 1906–1924, 1935–2014, 2018–present)
Month	Jan	Feb	Mar	Apr	May	Jun	Jul	Aug	Sep	Oct	Nov	Dec	Year
Record high °F (°C)	83 (28)	90 (32)	102 (39)	101 (38)	105 (41)	112 (44)	111 (44)	110 (43)	108 (42)	99 (37)	91 (33)	85 (29)	112 (44)
Mean daily maximum °F (°C)	48.9 (9.4)	52.9 (11.6)	61.7 (16.5)	70.7 (21.5)	80.2 (26.8)	90.2 (32.3)	94.1 (34.5)	92.1 (33.4)	85.6 (29.8)	72.3 (22.4)	59.3 (15.2)	48.6 (9.2)	71.4 (21.9)
Daily mean °F (°C)	35.1 (1.7)	38.1 (3.4)	46.6 (8.1)	55.8 (13.2)	66.0 (18.9)	76.0 (24.4)	80.3 (26.8)	78.6 (25.9)	71.2 (21.8)	58.0 (14.4)	45.2 (7.3)	35.4 (1.9)	57.2 (14.0)
Mean daily minimum °F (°C)	21.2 (−6.0)	23.2 (−4.9)	31.5 (−0.3)	40.9 (4.9)	51.7 (10.9)	61.8 (16.6)	66.5 (19.2)	65.1 (18.4)	56.9 (13.8)	43.6 (6.4)	31.1 (−0.5)	22.2 (−5.4)	43.0 (6.1)
Record low °F (°C)	−22 (−30)	−16 (−27)	−18 (−28)	7 (−14)	19 (−7)	35 (2)	48 (9)	39 (4)	29 (−2)	9 (−13)	−6 (−21)	−15 (−26)	−22 (−30)
Average precipitation inches (mm)	0.55 (14)	0.43 (11)	1.26 (32)	1.40 (36)	2.46 (62)	2.91 (74)	2.86 (73)	2.35 (60)	1.27 (32)	1.98 (50)	0.59 (15)	1.05 (27)	19.11 (485)
Average snowfall inches (cm)	3.9 (9.9)	3.1 (7.9)	4.3 (11)	0.3 (0.76)	0.0 (0.0)	0.0 (0.0)	0.0 (0.0)	0.0 (0.0)	0.0 (0.0)	0.4 (1.0)	1.0 (2.5)	4.0 (10)	17.0 (43)
Average precipitation days (≥ 0.01 in)	2.6	2.7	4.2	5.1	5.5	7.0	6.8	6.7	4.8	4.3	3.3	3.6	56.6
Average snowy days (≥ 0.1 in)	2.4	1.9	1.4	0.2	0.0	0.0	0.0	0.0	0.0	0.1	0.6	2.0	8.6
Source: NOAA

== Demographics ==
Historical population
Census	Pop.	Note	%±
1910	525		—
1920	946		80.2%
1930	1,682		77.8%
1940	1,146		−31.9%
1950	1,842		60.7%
1960	1,684		−8.6%
1970	1,615		−4.1%
1980	1,788		10.7%
1990	1,551		−13.3%
2000	1,788		15.3%
2010	1,918		7.3%
2020	1,802		−6.0%
U.S. Decennial Census

=== 2020 census ===
As of the 2020 census, Hooker had a population of 1,802, and the median age was 32.9 years; 32.2% of residents were under the age of 18 and 12.4% of residents were 65 years of age or older. For every 100 females there were 99.1 males, and for every 100 females age 18 and over there were 95.0 males age 18 and over.

0% of residents lived in urban areas, while 100.0% lived in rural areas.

There were 636 households in Hooker, of which 42.8% had children under the age of 18 living in them. Of all households, 56.0% were married-couple households, 15.6% were households with a male householder and no spouse or partner present, and 25.2% were households with a female householder and no spouse or partner present. About 22.8% of all households were made up of individuals and 10.6% had someone living alone who was 65 years of age or older.

There were 730 housing units, of which 12.9% were vacant. Among occupied housing units, 76.1% were owner-occupied and 23.9% were renter-occupied. The homeowner vacancy rate was 0.6% and the rental vacancy rate was 7.8%.

Racial composition as of the 2020 census
Race	Percent
White	58.4%
Black or African American	0.1%
American Indian and Alaska Native	1.1%
Asian	0.3%
Native Hawaiian and Other Pacific Islander	0%
Some other race	23.4%
Two or more races	16.6%
Hispanic or Latino (of any race)	44.6%

=== 2000 census ===
As of the 2000 census, there were 1,788 people, 702 households, and 511 families residing in the city. The population density was 1,960.4 inhabitants per square mile (756.9/km^{2}). There were 812 housing units at an average density of 890.3 per square mile (343.7/km^{2}). The racial makeup of the city was 96.13% White, 0.11% African American, 1.73% Native American, 0.11% Asian, 0.01% from other races, and 1.90% from two or more races. Hispanic or Latino of any race were 14.60% of the population.

There were 702 households, out of which 35.6% had children under the age of 18 living with them, 58.8% were married couples living together, 9.5% had a female householder with no husband present, and 27.1% were non-families. 24.8% of all households were made up of individuals, and 13.0% had someone living alone who was 65 years of age or older. The average household size was 2.54 and the average family size was 3.02.

In the city, the population was spread out, with 28.0% under the age of 18, 8.6% from 18 to 24, 27.2% from 25 to 44, 21.9% from 45 to 64, and 14.3% who were 65 years of age or older. The median age was 36 years. For every 100 females, there were 96.3 males. For every 100 females age 18 and over, there were 92.7 males.

The median income for a household in the city was $34,688, and the median income for a family was $39,113. Males had a median income of $30,694 versus $20,217 for females. The per capita income for the city was $18,086. About 9.1% of families and 10.4% of the population were below the poverty line, including 15.0% of those under age 18 and 5.9% of those age 65 or over.

== Government ==
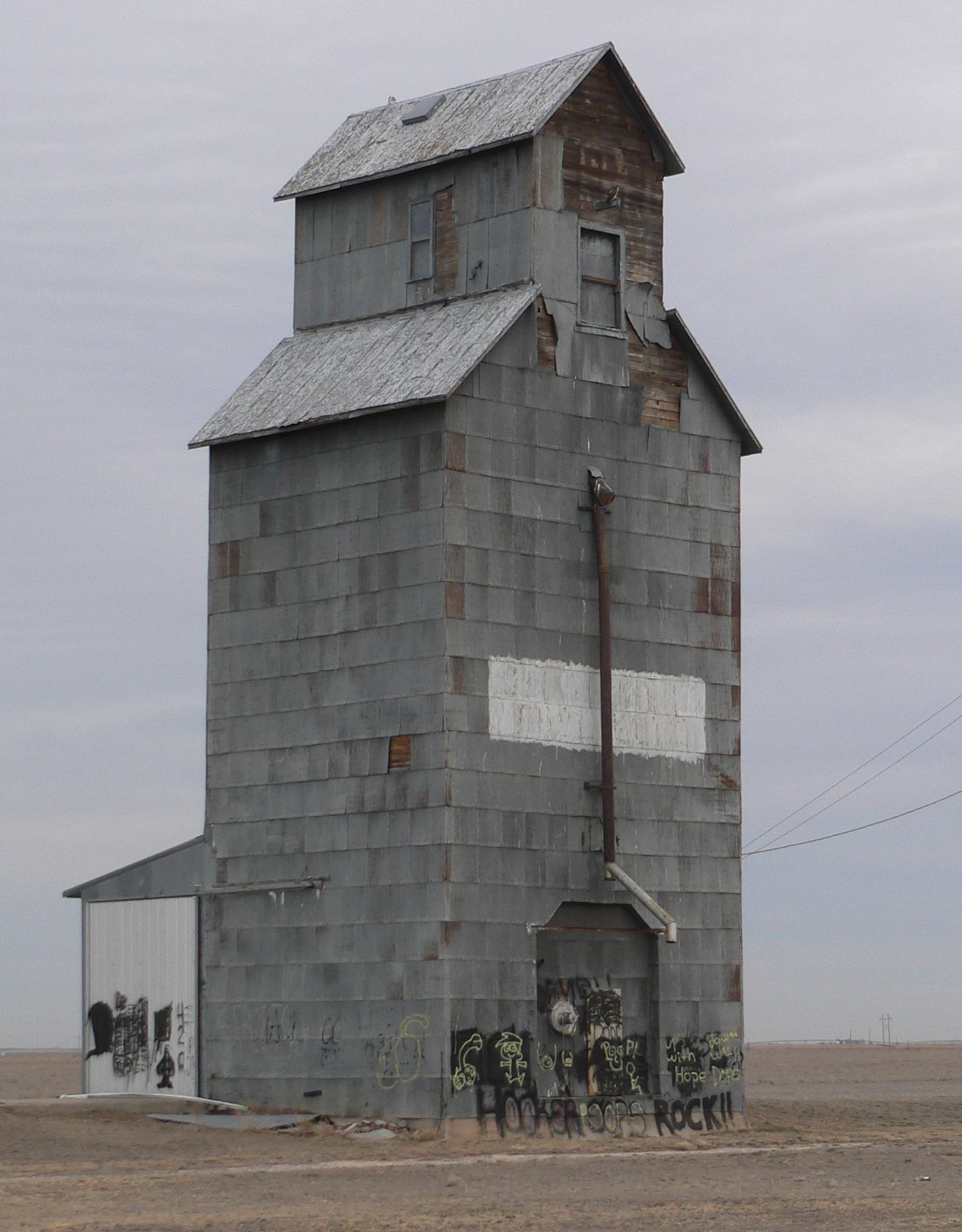
Wood-frame grain elevator at the northern edge of Hooker

The Hooker government consists of a mayor and four council members.

- City Hall, 111 S Broadway.

== Transportation ==
US Route 54 and US Route 64 intersect at Hooker.

Hooker Municipal Airport (FAA ID: O45), about 1 mile west, has a 3312’ x 60’ paved runway.

Commercial air transportation is available out of Liberal Mid-America Regional Airport in Kansas, about 21 miles to the northeast.

Rail freight service is available from the Union Pacific Railroad.

== NRHP Sites ==
The Hooker Woodframe Grain Elevator off Texas Avenue, as well as the Elmer Baker Barn off Mile 47 Road, are NRHP-listed.

== Education ==
It is in the Hooker Public Schools school district.

== Notable people ==
- Sandra Giles (1932–2016), actress, raised in Hooker
- John "Hooker" Threlkeld (1864-1938), founder of town, how Hooker got its name.
