= Guymon, Oklahoma =

- City
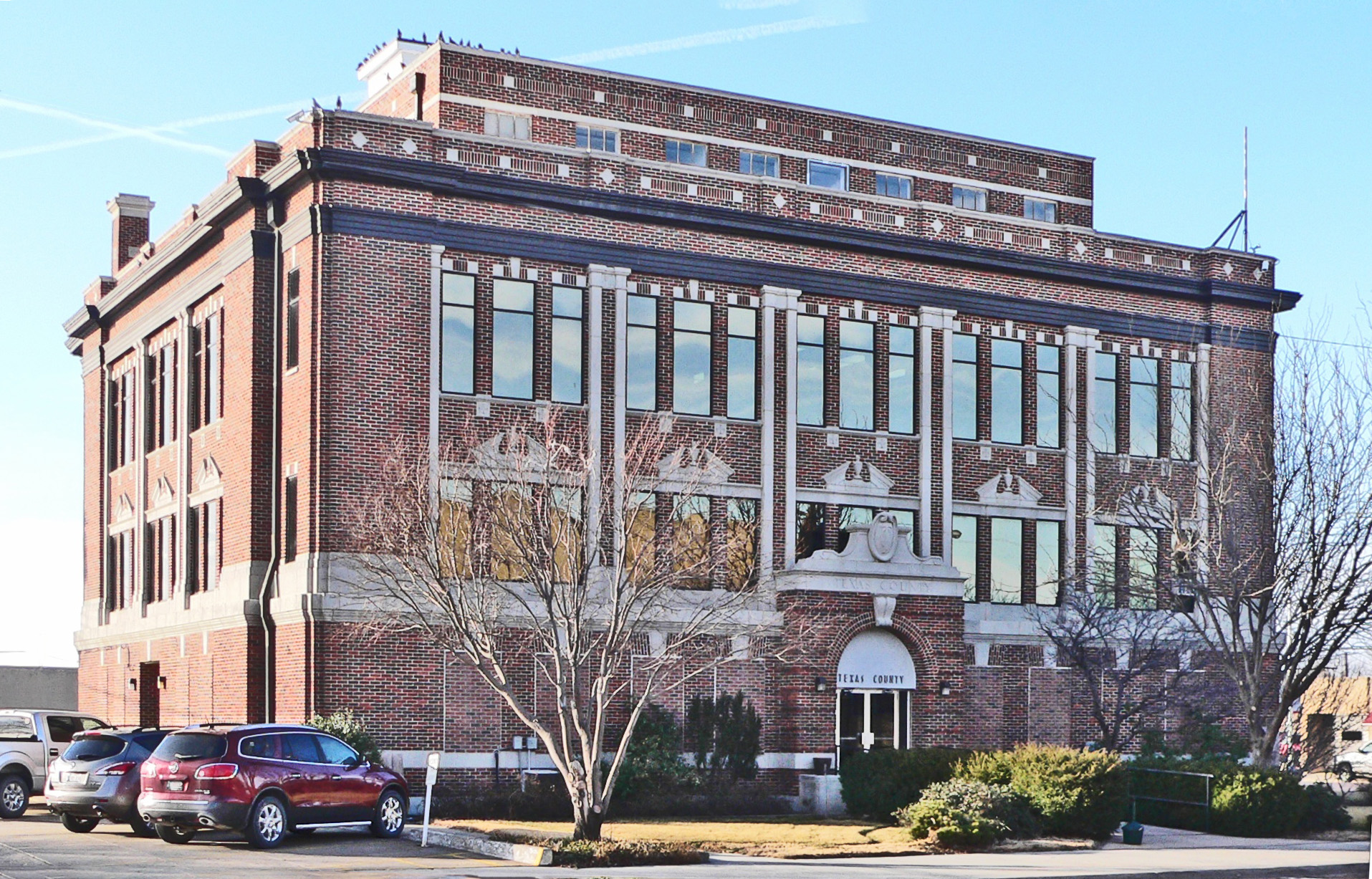
- Texas County Courthouse (2012)

- Location within Texas County and Oklahoma

- Location in the United States Location in Oklahoma
- Coordinates: 36.6828041°N 101.4815493°W
- Country: United States
- State: Oklahoma
- County: Texas
- Incorporated: 1901

Government
  - Type: Council–Manager
  - Mayor: Sean Livengood
  - City Manager: Michael Shannon (interim)

Area
  - Total: 7.76 sq mi (20.09 km^{2})
  - Land: 7.73 sq mi (20.03 km^{2})
  - Water: 0.023 sq mi (0.06 km^{2})
- Elevation: 3,124 ft (952 m)

Population (2020)
  - Total: 12,965
  - Density: 1,676/sq mi (647.2/km^{2})
- Time zone: UTC−6 (CST)
  - Summer (DST): UTC−5 (CDT)
- ZIP code: 73942
- Area code: 580
- FIPS code: 40-31750
- GNIS ID: 1093452
- Website: GuymonOK.org

Guymon (/ˈɡaɪmən/ GHY-mən) is a city in and the county seat of Texas County, in the panhandle of Oklahoma, United States. As of the 2020 census, the city population was 12,965, an increase of 13.3% from 11,442 in 2010, and represents more than half of the population of the county, along with being the largest city in the Oklahoma Panhandle. Cattle feedlots, corporate pork farms, and natural gas production dominate its economy, with wind energy production and transmission recently diversifying landowners' farms. Guymon was the only municipality in the state of Oklahoma in which the majority of the population was Hispanic as recorded in the 2010 and 2020 United States Census reports.

== History ==
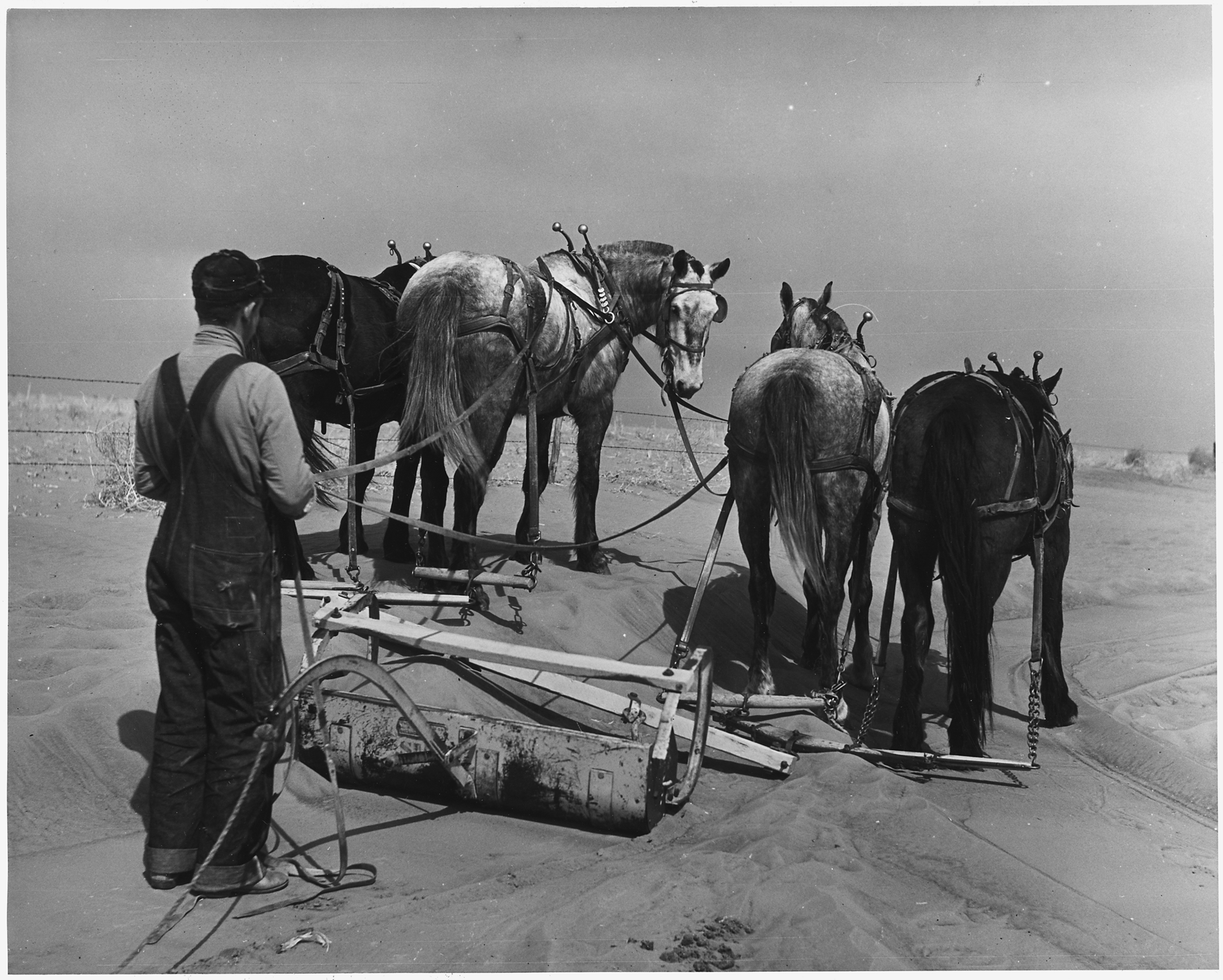
Removing drifts of soil which block highways near Guymon during the Dustbowl.

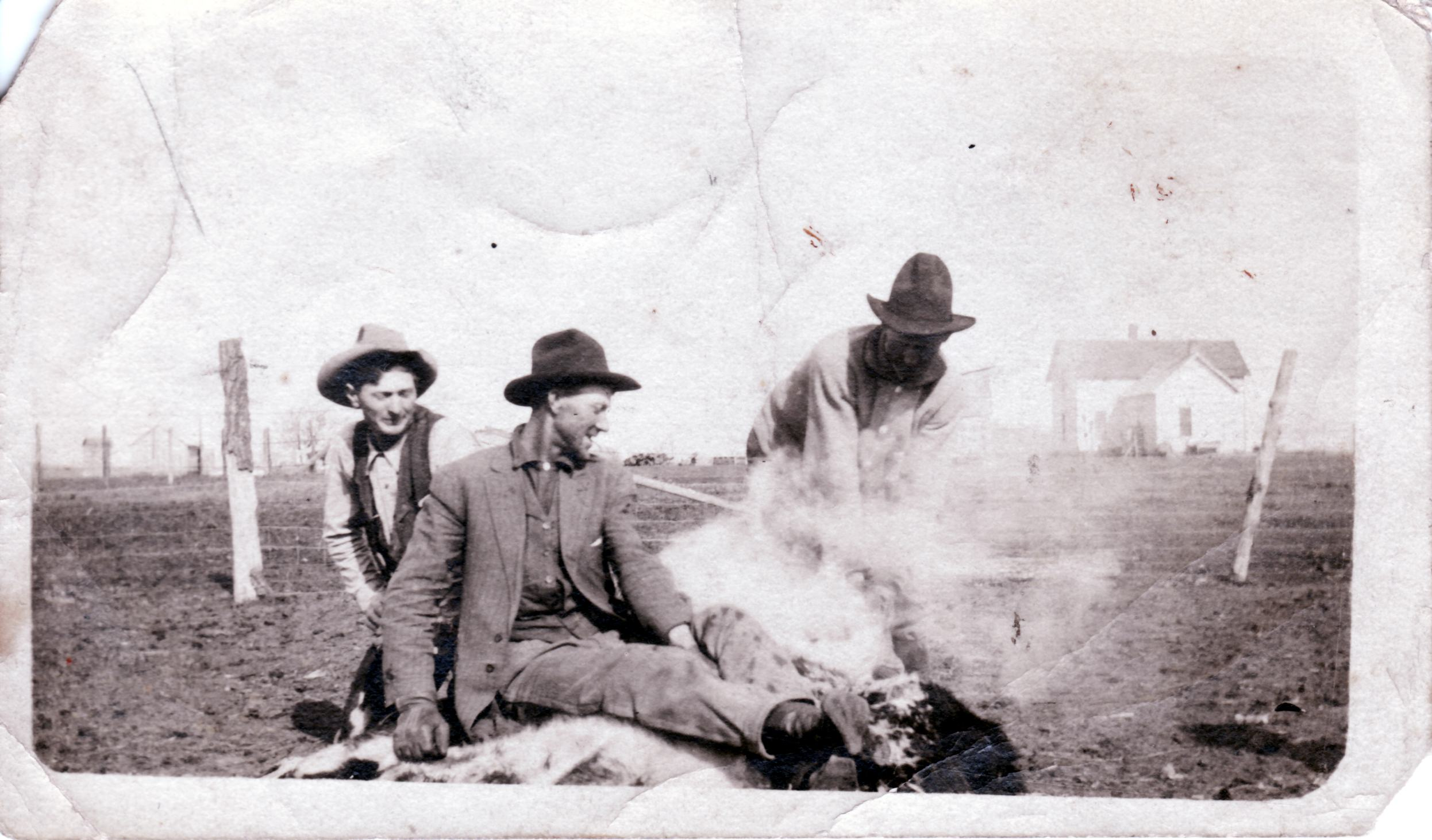
Cowboys at Anchor D ranch in Guymon in 1917.

In the 1890s, Edward T. "E.T." Guymon, president of the Inter-State Land and Town Company, purchased a section of land west of the Beaver River, also known as the North Canadian River. The site grew very rapidly after the Chicago, Rock Island and Pacific Railway (Rock Island) built a line from Liberal, Kansas, to Texhoma, Texas, in 1901. A community, first named Sanford by the U.S. Post Office Department, was situated along the line. It was renamed Guymon a month later by postal officials to avoid confusion with the town of Stratford, Texas, which was further down the line. Guymon incorporated in 1901. The town plat was filed in Beaver County, Oklahoma Territory, in 1904.

Guymon's growth was helped when most of the businesses moved there from the nearby town of Hardesty. One of these was the newspaper, Hardesty Herald, which owner Richard B. Quinn quickly renamed as the Guymon Herald. When Oklahoma became a state in 1907, Guymon claimed 839 residents, and was named county seat of the newly created Texas County. By the 1910 U.S. census, the town had 1,342 residents. It also had three banks, three hotels, four doctors, a flour mill, a grain company, and several retail establishments. A second newspaper, the Guymon Democrat, was in business. Agriculture became the basis of Guymon's economy. The 1920 census recorded 1,507 residents, which grew to 2,181 in 1930. By 1932, the town had two cream stations and five grain elevators.

The Great Depression and the Dust Bowl of the 1930s had a negative effect on Guymon. Some old-time residents remember "Black Sunday", April 14, 1935, as the day of the worst dust storm in the area's history. However, discovery of the nearby Hugoton-Panhandle gas field created many new jobs, and brought Guymon's population to 2,290 in 1940.

The Guymon Pioneer Days Rodeo has been held every May since 1933. In 2014, the rodeo was inducted into the ProRodeo Hall of Fame of the Professional Rodeo Cowboys Association. In 2006, the rodeo had over 900 contestants with over $385,000 in prize money.

== Geography ==
Located on the High Plains of the central Oklahoma Panhandle, Guymon sits 122 miles (196 km) north of Amarillo, Texas, and 120 miles (193 km) west-northwest of Woodward. Optima National Wildlife Refuge, Optima Lake, and the state-run Optima Wildlife Management Area lie roughly 16 miles (26 km) to the east along the North Canadian River. Guymon sits at an elevation of 3,124 feet (952 m). According to the United States Census Bureau, the city has a total area of 7.3 square miles (18.9 km^{2}), of which 7.3 square miles (18.9 km^{2}) are land and 0.04 square miles (0.1 km^{2}) (0.27%) is covered by water.

=== Climate ===
Guymon has a cool semi-arid climate (Köppen BSk) with hot summers (July mean maximum temperature of 93 °F or 34 °C) and cold though extremely variable winters (January mean minimum of 21 °F or −6 °C). Precipitation ranges from 0.5 inches or 13 millimeters in January to 3.5 inches or 89 millimeters in July. Snowfall peaks at 3.9 inches or 0.099 meters in February.

Climate data for Guymon, Oklahoma
Month	Jan	Feb	Mar	Apr	May	Jun	Jul	Aug	Sep	Oct	Nov	Dec	Year
Record high °F (°C)	83 (28)	84 (29)	93 (34)	96 (36)	108 (42)	108 (42)	107 (42)	108 (42)	106 (41)	98 (37)	86 (30)	86 (30)	108 (42)
Mean daily maximum °F (°C)	48 (9)	52 (11)	58 (14)	69 (21)	78 (26)	89 (32)	93 (34)	92 (33)	85 (29)	74 (23)	59 (15)	51 (11)	71 (22)
Mean daily minimum °F (°C)	21 (−6)	25 (−4)	29 (−2)	41 (5)	50 (10)	61 (16)	65 (18)	65 (18)	56 (13)	44 (7)	30 (−1)	24 (−4)	43 (6)
Record low °F (°C)	−19 (−28)	−11 (−24)	−7 (−22)	17 (−8)	28 (−2)	41 (5)	48 (9)	46 (8)	31 (−1)	24 (−4)	4 (−16)	0 (−18)	−19 (−28)
Average precipitation inches (mm)	0.5 (13)	0.9 (23)	0.8 (20)	1.7 (43)	3.1 (79)	2.5 (64)	3.5 (89)	2.8 (71)	1.9 (48)	1.8 (46)	0.8 (20)	0.6 (15)	20.9 (530)
Average snowfall inches (cm)	3.2 (8.1)	3.9 (9.9)	3.3 (8.4)	1 (2.5)	0.1 (0.25)	0 (0)	0 (0)	0 (0)	0 (0)	0.2 (0.51)	1.3 (3.3)	3.5 (8.9)	16.5 (42)
Average rainy days	1.6	2.6	2.2	4.3	6.2	4.9	6.2	5.4	3.6	3.4	2	2	44.4
Average relative humidity (%)	75	71	62	67	59	58	58	54	55	61	58	73	63
Source 1: weather.com
Source 2: Weatherbase.com

== Demographics ==
Guymon, Oklahoma – Racial and ethnic composition Note: the US Census treats Hispanic/Latino as an ethnic category. This table excludes Latinos from the racial categories and assigns them to a separate category. Hispanics/Latinos may be of any race.
Race / Ethnicity (NH = Non-Hispanic)	Pop 2000	Pop 2010	Pop 2020	% 2000	% 2010	% 2020
White alone (NH)	6,071	4,858	3,633	57.97%	42.46%	28.02%
Black or African American alone (NH)	65	147	863	0.62%	1.28%	6.66%
Native American or Alaska Native alone (NH)	89	94	67	0.85%	0.82%	0.52%
Asian alone (NH)	87	304	416	0.83%	2.66%	3.21%
Native Hawaiian or Pacific Islander alone (NH)	18	5	0	0.17%	0.04%	0.00%
Other race alone (NH)	4	16	64	0.04%	0.14%	0.49%
Mixed race or Multiracial (NH)	120	122	341	1.15%	1.07%	2.63%
Hispanic or Latino (any race)	4,018	5,896	7,581	38.37%	51.53%	58.47%
Total	10,472	11,442	12,965	100.00%	100.00%	100.00%

Historical population
Census	Pop.	Note	%±
1910	1,342		—
1920	1,507		12.3%
1930	2,181		44.7%
1940	2,290		5.0%
1950	4,718		106.0%
1960	5,768		22.3%
1970	7,674		33.0%
1980	8,492		10.7%
1990	7,803		−8.1%
2000	10,472		34.2%
2010	11,442		9.3%
2020	12,965		13.3%
U.S. Decennial Census

=== 2020 census ===
As of the 2020 census, Guymon had a population of 12,965. The median age was 30.6 years. 31.4% of residents were under the age of 18 and 9.9% of residents were 65 years of age or older. For every 100 females there were 105.2 males, and for every 100 females age 18 and over there were 108.1 males age 18 and over.

The population density was 1,662 inhabitants per square mile (642/km^{2}). 96.5% of residents lived in urban areas, while 3.5% lived in rural areas.

There were 4,325 households in Guymon, of which 43.0% had children under the age of 18 living in them. Of all households, 47.8% were married-couple households, 21.8% were households with a male householder and no spouse or partner present, and 24.7% were households with a female householder and no spouse or partner present. The average household size was 3.28 persons. About 23.8% of all households were made up of individuals and 8.4% had someone living alone who was 65 years of age or older.

There were 4,805 housing units, of which 10.0% were vacant. Among occupied housing units, 53.0% were owner-occupied and 47.0% were renter-occupied. The homeowner vacancy rate was 2.4% and the rental vacancy rate was 7.4%.

Racial composition as of the 2020 census
Race	Percent
White	37.4%
Black or African American	6.9%
American Indian and Alaska Native	3.4%
Asian	3.4%
Native Hawaiian and Other Pacific Islander	0%
Some other race	30.8%
Two or more races	18.2%
Hispanic or Latino (of any race)	58.5%

The median income for a household in the city was $53,164. The per capita income for the city was $19,455. About 24.6% of the population was below the poverty line.

=== 2010 census ===
As of 2010, 39.8% of households had children under the age of 18 living with them, 59.0% were married couples living together, 8.7% had a female householder with no husband present, and 27.9% were non-families. 21.5% of all households were made up of individuals, and 8.5% had someone living alone who was 65 years of age or older.

In the 2010 census, the population was spread out, with 31.3% under the age of 18 and 7.6% who were 65 years of age or older. 45.2% of the city's population was female.

In the 2010 census, Guymon had the fourth largest Hispanic population among cities in the state, trailing only Oklahoma City, Tulsa and Lawton. In terms of percentages, the Hispanic population of Guymon comprised 52 percent of the population, the highest percentage of Hispanic residents of any city or town in Oklahoma.

=== Recent developments ===
In 2022 the Hispanic population had increased to 57 percent of the population of Guymon. Guymon has been cited as an example of how immigration can save rural communities, most of which in Oklahoma and many other states have been losing population for decades.

== Economy ==
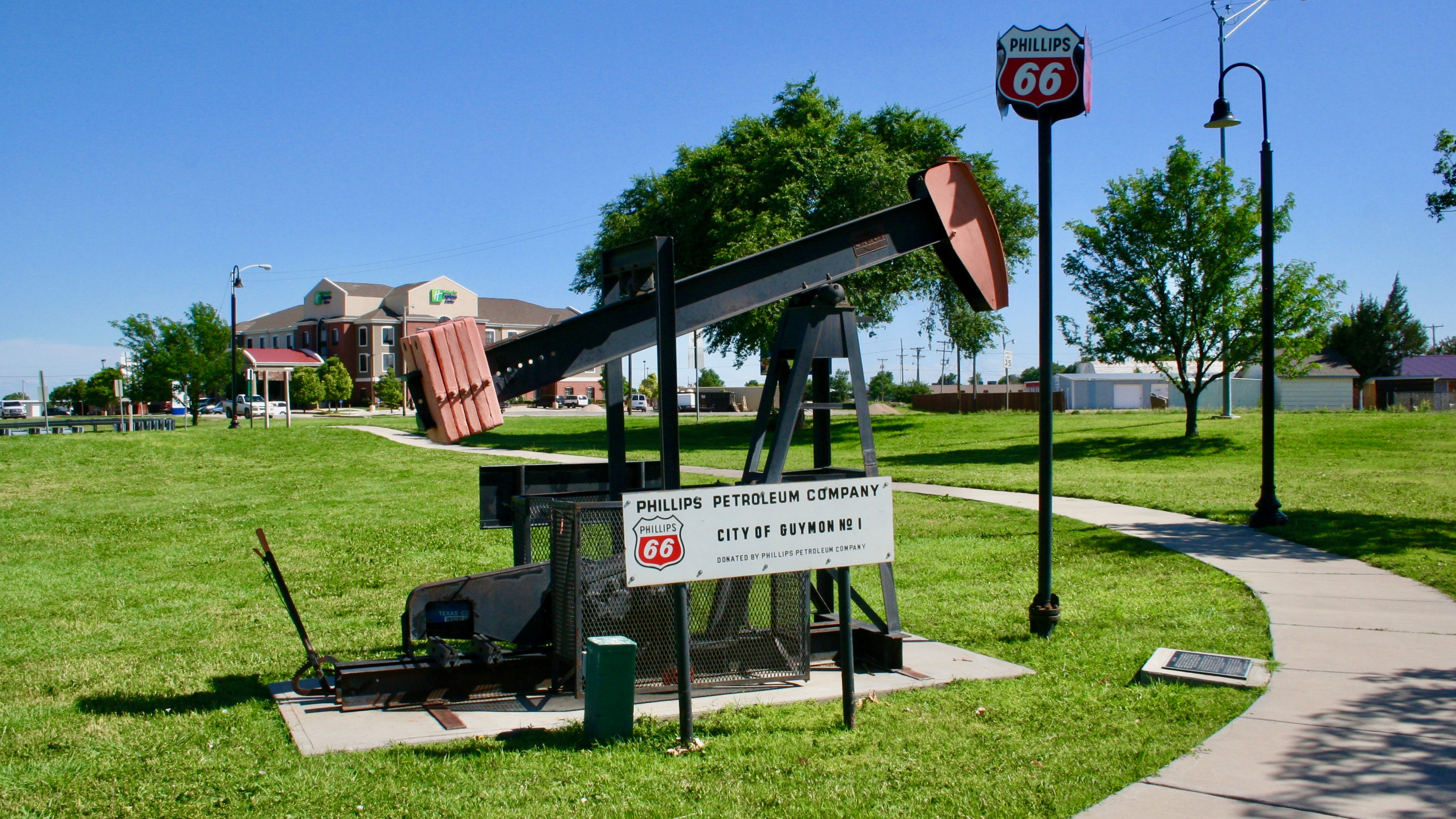
Phillips 66 Well No.1 in Centennial Park in Guymon

Guymon is a hub for the local economy, which includes wheat farming, livestock, hog and dairy farming, manufacturing, and oil and natural gas production. A United States soil conservation station is located nearby. Local manufacturers produce agricultural tillage tools, pressure tanks, and formula feeds. The town of Goodwell, Oklahoma, home of Oklahoma Panhandle State University, lies 11 miles (18 km) to the southwest of Guymon.

Opening of the Hugoton-Panhandle Gas Field led to the establishment of two carbon black plants, the Dandee Manufacturing Company (makers of farming equipment), an ice plant, the OK Welding Manufacturing Company, a feed mill, the Phillips Petroleum cracking plant, and the Southwestern Public Service Company generating plant. The Guymon Municipal Hospital (later renamed Memorial Hospital of Texas County) opened in 1949.

The city's largest employer, Seaboard pork processing plant, operates at double shift capacity and processes about 18,000 hogs each day, and its 2,300 employees make up about 20% of the entire city's population. Hitch Ranch, which began opening cattle feedlots during the 1960s, is the city's second-largest employer. A Swift and Company packing plant is located near Hitch Ranch. The City of Guymon, the Panhandle Telephone Cooperative, and the hospital round out the list of top employers. The employment opportunities created by these industries, especially of the Seaboard company, has led to an influx of Hispanics and recent immigrants to the U.S. which accounts for the population growth of Guymon and the surrounding area while most of Oklahoma's small cities and rural communities are losing population.

A movement to harness wind power for electricity generation began a large-scale boom in the Guymon area in 2011. The DeWind Company had two 40-megawatt projects online (near Goodwell) in 2012, joined by a 200-megawatt project in 2015.

== Government ==
Guymon has a council-manager form of government. Micheal Shannon was the city manager as of May 17, 2026.

== Education ==
Guymon residents are served by the Guymon School District. The school system began in the 1902–3 school year. The first high school building was built in 1917. Guymon schools were closed for one year during the Great Depression because funds were insufficient to keep them operating. The school district opened a new high school in 1954. This was replaced with a new facility in 1974.

The city has eight elementary schools, one junior high school, and one high school, whose team mascot is the Tiger.

High school

- Guymon High School - Grades: 9-12

Middle school

- Guymon Junior High School - Grades: 7-8

Elementary schools

- North Park - Grades: 5-6
- Academy - Grades: 3-4
- Prairie - Grades: 1-2
- Academy "C" - Grade: kindergarten
- Homer Long - Grade: kindergarten
- Carrier - Grade: Pre-Kindergarten

More than 80% of high school students qualify for a reduced-price school lunch, a common proxy for poverty.

About 30% of residents lack a high school diploma.

== Media ==
Guymon has one newspaper and four radio stations, although one is a translator.

- Guymon Herald, printed since 1891, is the only daily newspaper for the entire Oklahoma Panhandle.
- KKBS 92.7 FM - Rock
- KBIJ 99.5 FM - Regional Mexican
- KGYN 1210 AM - News and Sports Talk
- K215CV 90.9 FM - Christian Contemporary (Air1)

== Recreation ==
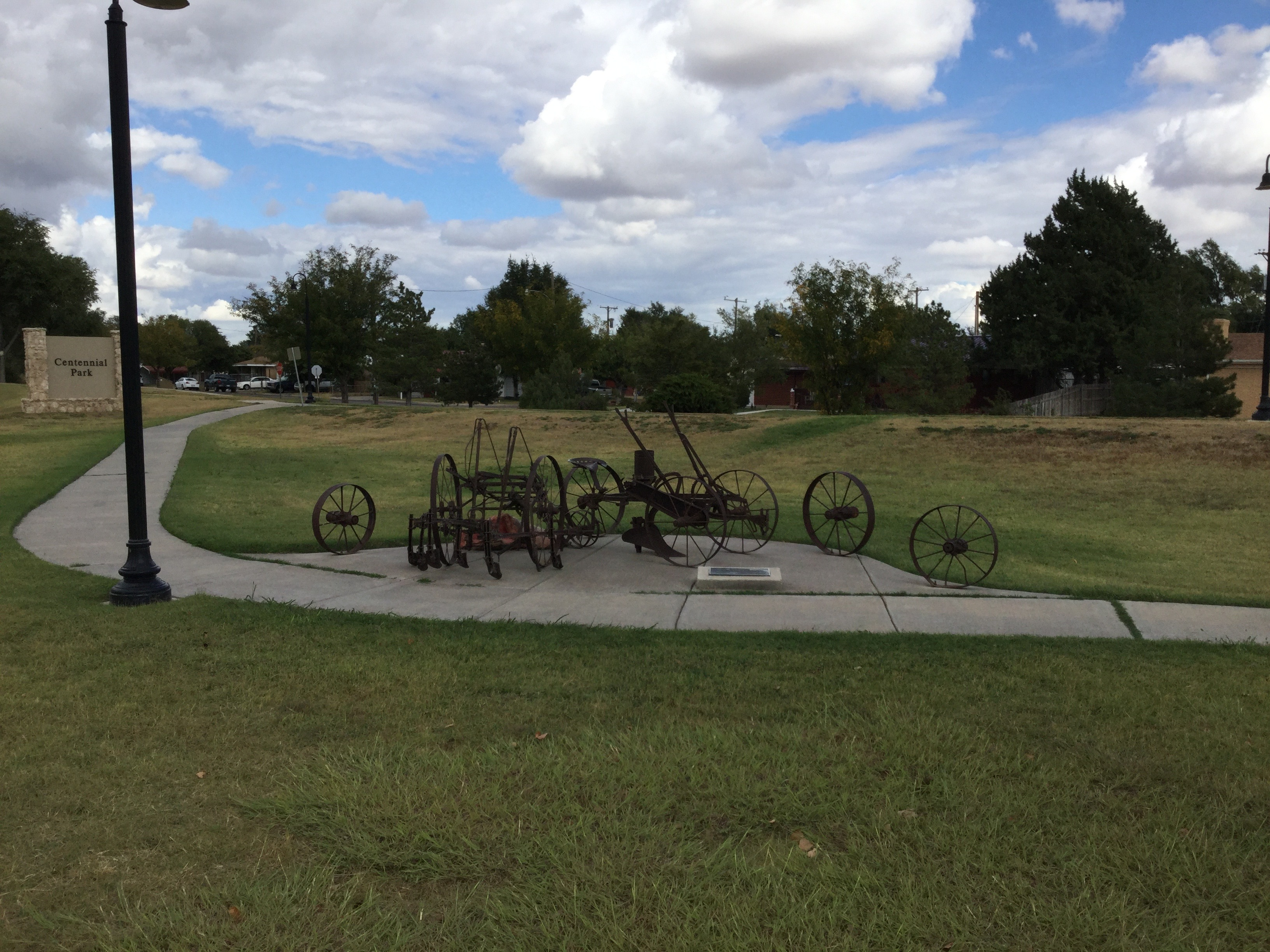
Centennial Park in Guymon (2021)

- Golden Mesa Casino is 2 1/2 mi west on US Hwy 54.
- Sunset Hills golf course – an 18-hole par-71 municipal course - is open to members and guests in Guymon.
- Sunset Lake and Thompson Park – a 32-acre stocked municipal lake - is open to fishing year-round, with paddle boats, an operating miniature train, ducks to be fed, playground equipment for children, picnic tables, and covered pavilions.
- No Mans Land Rifle and Pistol Club – a 50-station handgun and rimfire rifle range - is open to members of the club, located near Sunset Lake and Thompson Park, and open for use during daylight hours.
- Nearby Optima National Wildlife Refuge offers bird and wildlife viewing opportunities, and the Optima Wildlife Management Area, run by the Oklahoma Department of Wildlife Conservation, offers hunting opportunities.

== Infrastructure ==
=== Transportation ===
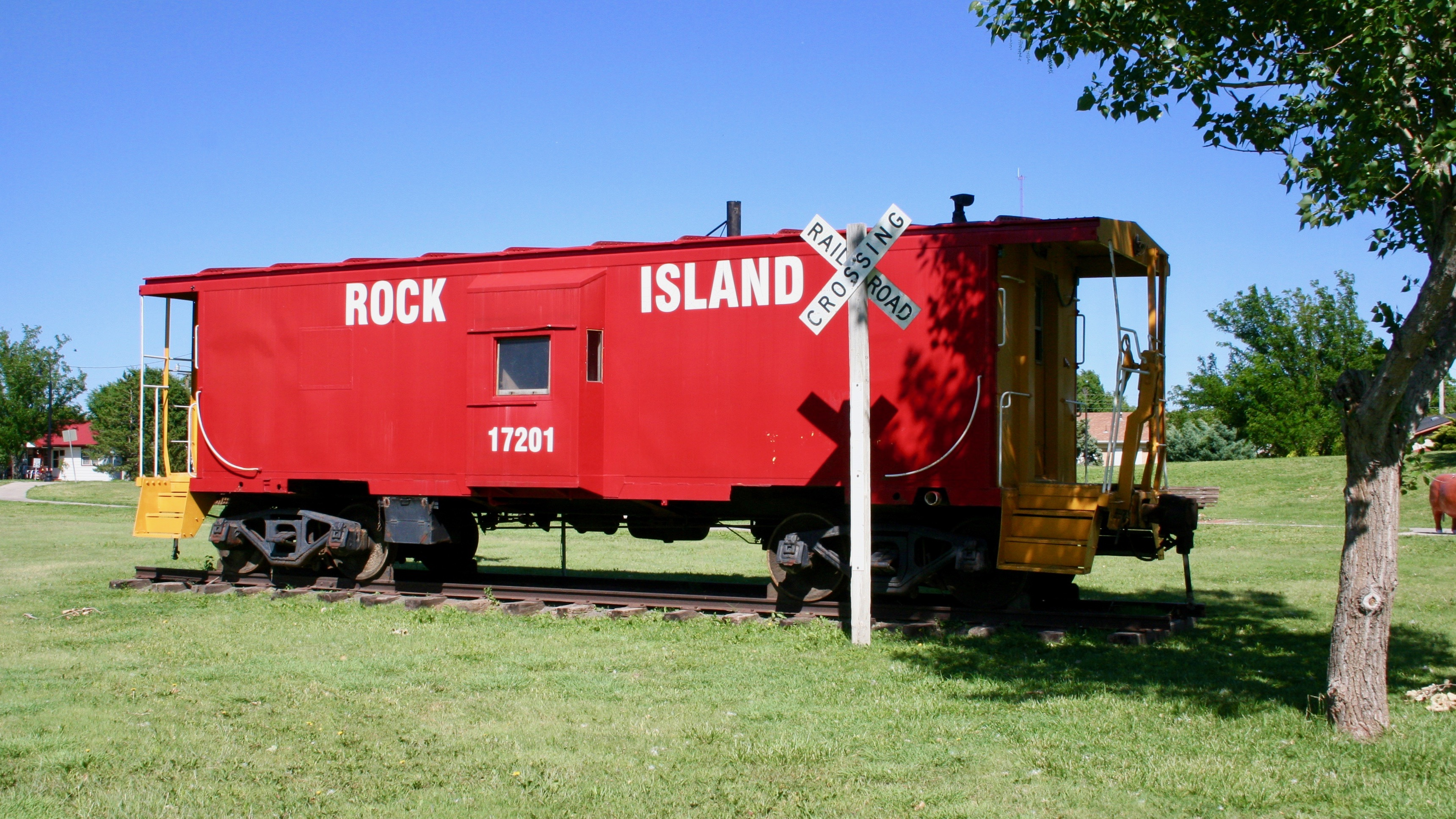
Rock Island Caboose in Centennial Park in Guymon (2019)

Guymon is served by US-54, US-64, US-412, SH-3, and SH-136, some of said roads being partially concurrent or completely concurrent with others through Guymon.

Guymon Municipal Airport is a city-owned, public-use airport located two nautical miles (3.7 km) west of the central business district of Guymon.

Commercial air transport is available out of Liberal Mid-America Regional Airport in Kansas, about 41 miles northeast of town.

Rail freight service is available from the Union Pacific Railroad.

== Notable people ==
- Jeremy Sochan (b. 2003) - Basketball player for the San Antonio Spurs, was born in Guymon but relocated to Southampton as an infant.
- Michael D. Brown (b. 1954) – former FEMA director was born in Guymon in 1955.
- Claudia Bryar (1918–2011) - film and television actress, was born in Guymon.
- F. Hiner Dale (1881–1968) – Judge and founder of Guymon law firm of Wright, Dale, and Jett
- Gordon Grice (b. 1965) – award-winning nature writer, was born in Guymon.
- Ross Rizley (1892–1969) - former U.S. Representative, is buried in Guymon.
- Sammi Smith (1943–2005) - country music star - born Jewel Faye Smith

== See also ==
- National Register of Historic Places listings in Texas County, Oklahoma
