= K-23 (Kansas highway) =

State highway in Kansas, U.S.

K-23
- K-23 in red, K-23 Alternate in blue, K-23 Spur in green

Route information
- Maintained by KDOT and the cities of Cimarron, and Hoxie
- Length: 199.117 mi (320.448 km)
- History: Designated K-20 in 1926; renumbered to K-23 in 1927

Major junctions
- South end: SH-23 near Forgan, OK
- US-54 / US-160 in Meade; US-56 near Montezuma; US-50 / US-400 in Cimarron; K-156 in rural Finney County; K-96 in Dighton; K-4 near Healy; I-70 / US-40 near Grainfield; US-24 in Hoxie
- North end: US-83 / K-383 near Selden

Location
- Country: United States
- State: Kansas
- Counties: Meade, Gray, Finney, Lane, Gove, Sheridan

Highway system
- Kansas State Highway System; Interstate; US; State; Spurs
← K-22	→ US-24
← K-20	→ K-21
← K-98	→ K-99

K-23 is a 199.117-mile-long (320.448 km) south–north state highway in the U.S. State of Kansas. It starts as a continuation of Oklahoma State Highway 23 (SH-23) and it runs northward to U.S. Route 83 (US-83) and K-383 near Selden. Along the way it intersects several major east–west highways, including US-54 and US-160 in Meade, US-50 and US-400 in Cimarron, US-56 near Montezuma, K-4 near Healy, and Interstate 70 (I-70) and US-40 south of Grainfield. All but about 1.5 miles (2.4 km) of K-23's alignment is maintained by the Kansas Department of Transportation. The entire section within Cimarron is maintained by the city and a section in Hoxie from Utah Street to Queen Street is maintained by the city.

Before state highways were numbered in Kansas there were auto trails. In Meade K-23 crosses the former Atlantic and Pacific Highway. Then in Cimarron it crosses the former National Old Trails Road, Old Santa Fe Trail, New Santa Fe Trail and Albert Pike Highway. Further north in Dighton it crosses the former Kansas-Colorado Boulevard. Then the overlap with K-4 follows the former Bee Line. By Grainfield, the section that follows old US-40 is the former Golden Belt. A section from Hoxie southward along K-23 follows the former Roosevelt National Highway. Farther north in Hoxie, it crosses the former Kansas White Way and former Blue Line. The northern terminus connects to the former Pikes Peak Ocean to Ocean Highway.

The section of K-23 from Dighton north to Hoxie was first designated as a state highway in 1926, as K-20. By 1927, it was renumbered as K-23 and extended north to the Nebraska state line. By 1931, US-36 in Dresden had become US-83, and US-183 was created and overlapped K-23 from US-83 to Nebraska. By 1932, K-23 was extended from Dighton southward to Meade. Between July 1938 and 1940, US-183 was realigned to go east from Oberlin, at this time K-23 was realigned to follow K-9 west to US-83, then north to Oberlin. This lasted until 1945, when K-23 was truncated to US-83, and US-83 replaced K-23 from here north to Oberlin. In 1961, K-23's southern end was realigned to follow the former K-98 to Meade State Lake then south over a previously unnumbered road to the Oklahoma border.

== Route description ==
The Kansas Department of Transportation (KDOT) tracks the traffic levels on its highways, and in 2018, they determined that on average the traffic varied from 390 vehicles per day just south of K-156 to 1760 vehicles per day just south of Cimarron. K-23 is not included in the National Highway System, a system of highways important to the nation's defense, economy, and mobility. However, it does connect to the National Highway System at its junction with US-54 and US-160 in Meade, US-50 and US-400 in Cimarron, I-70 and US-40 by Grainfield, and its northern terminus at US-83 and K-383. All but 1.557 miles (3 km) of K-23's alignment is maintained by KDOT. The entire section of K-23 within Cimarron is maintained by the city. A 0.291-mile-long (0.468 km) section of K-23 in Hoxie from slightly south of Utah Street northward to slightly north of Queen Street is maintained by the city.

=== Meade and Gray counties ===
K-23 begins its northerly journey at the Kansas-Oklahoma state line northwest of Forgan, Oklahoma, picking up northbound traffic from Oklahoma State Highway 23. It soon crosses the Cimarron River, then passes through a series of s-curves through flat land with a few hills. The highway then curves to the east, and passes along the south side of Meade State Park, the location of Lake Meade. After about four miles (6.4 km) the roadway curves north at an intersection with V Road and 18 Road. K-23 travels north for 7.5 miles (12.1 km), crossing Crooked Creek along the way, and enters Meade becoming Fowler Street. In the city it intersects US-54 and US-160, known as Carthage Street, downtown. As the highway exits Meade, it crosses a Union Pacific Railroad track and begins to traverse rolling hills. After about 6.5 miles (10.5 km), K-23 reaches a junction with K-98 at the 6th Standard Parallel South. The road begins to level out, and after about 4.2 miles (6.8 km) north it crosses a different Crooked Creek, then crosses into Gray County 1.8 miles (2.9 km) later.

K-23 advances north into the county and intersects Jumbo Road after about two miles (3.2 km). About 8.5 miles (13.7 km) later the highway intersects US-56 and crosses a Cimarron Valley Railroad track, southwest of Haggard. The road passes a KBSD-DT transmitter station then intersects Ford-Ensign Road. From Ford-Ensign Road, the highway continues north for six miles (9.7 km) and intersects Beeson Road. K-23 continues north for 4.6 miles (7.4 km) then enters Cimarron and becomes Main Street. The road continues a few blocks through the city and intersects US-50 and US-400, known as Avenue A, which is a part of the America Discovery Trail. As K-23 exits Cimarron, it crosses the 5th Standard Parallel South as the route begins to alternate between flat and hilly land through farmland. About 7.8 miles (12.6 km) north of Cimarron, the highway crosses Buckner Creek and then enters into Finney County.

=== Finney and Lane counties ===
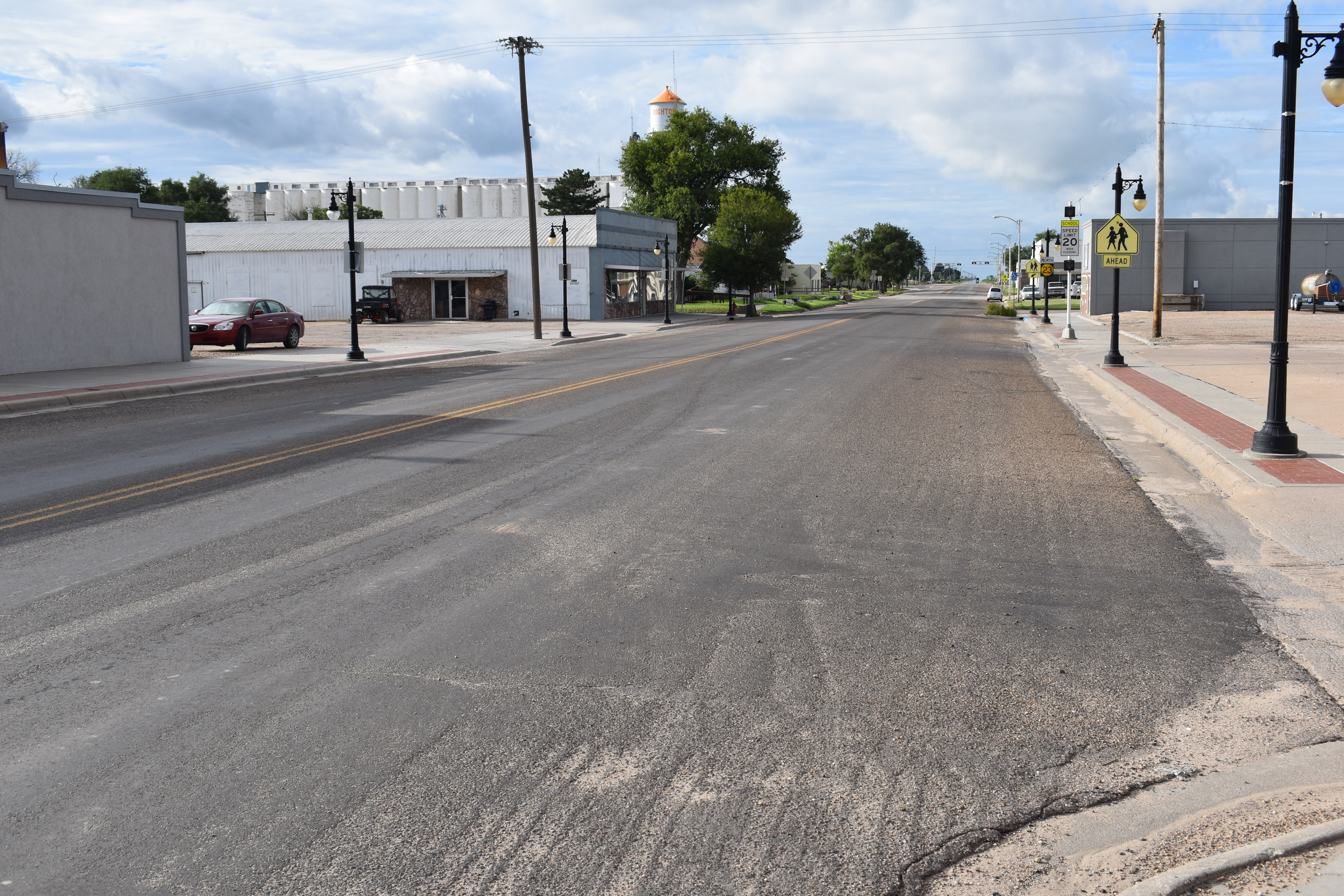
K-23 northbound in Dighton

K-23 continues north into the county for four miles (6.4 km), then intersects K-156 just west of Kalvesta. Here, the highway turns west and overlaps K-156 for six miles (9.7 km) then turns north again and leaves K-156. K-23 begins to level out, and after about 6.5 miles (10.5 km) crosses the Pawnee River then intersects Lake Road. Another five miles (8.0 km) north the highway intersects Potter Road, then crosses into Lane County about two miles (3.2 km) later, at the Fourth Standard Parallel South. K-23 continues northward into the county through rural farmlands and after about 3.9 miles (6.3 km) crosses Hackberry Creek, then Buffalo Creek about 4.5 miles (7.2 km) later. About 6.1 miles (9.8 km) later the roadway crosses South Fork Walnut Creek.

K-23 then enters Dighton, the only city in Lane County, becoming Main Street. A few blocks into the city, is an intersection with K-96, known as Long Street, at a four-way intersection. K-96 here is codesignated as U.S. Bicycle Route 76 (Trans America Trail). As K-23 exits Dighton, it crosses the Kansas and Oklahoma Railway, and after roughly 2.3 miles (3.7 km) crosses Middle Fork Walnut Creek. The highway continues for 3.7 miles (6.0 km) and crosses North Fork Walnut Creek. The roadway continues for about 2.5 miles (4.0 km) and intersects K-4, southwest of Shields. Here K-23 curves west and overlaps K-4 for two miles (3.2 km) then turns north again and leaves K-4. After roughly 6.1 miles (9.8 km) the highway crosses into Gove County, at the Third Standard Parallel South.

=== Gove and Sheridan counties ===
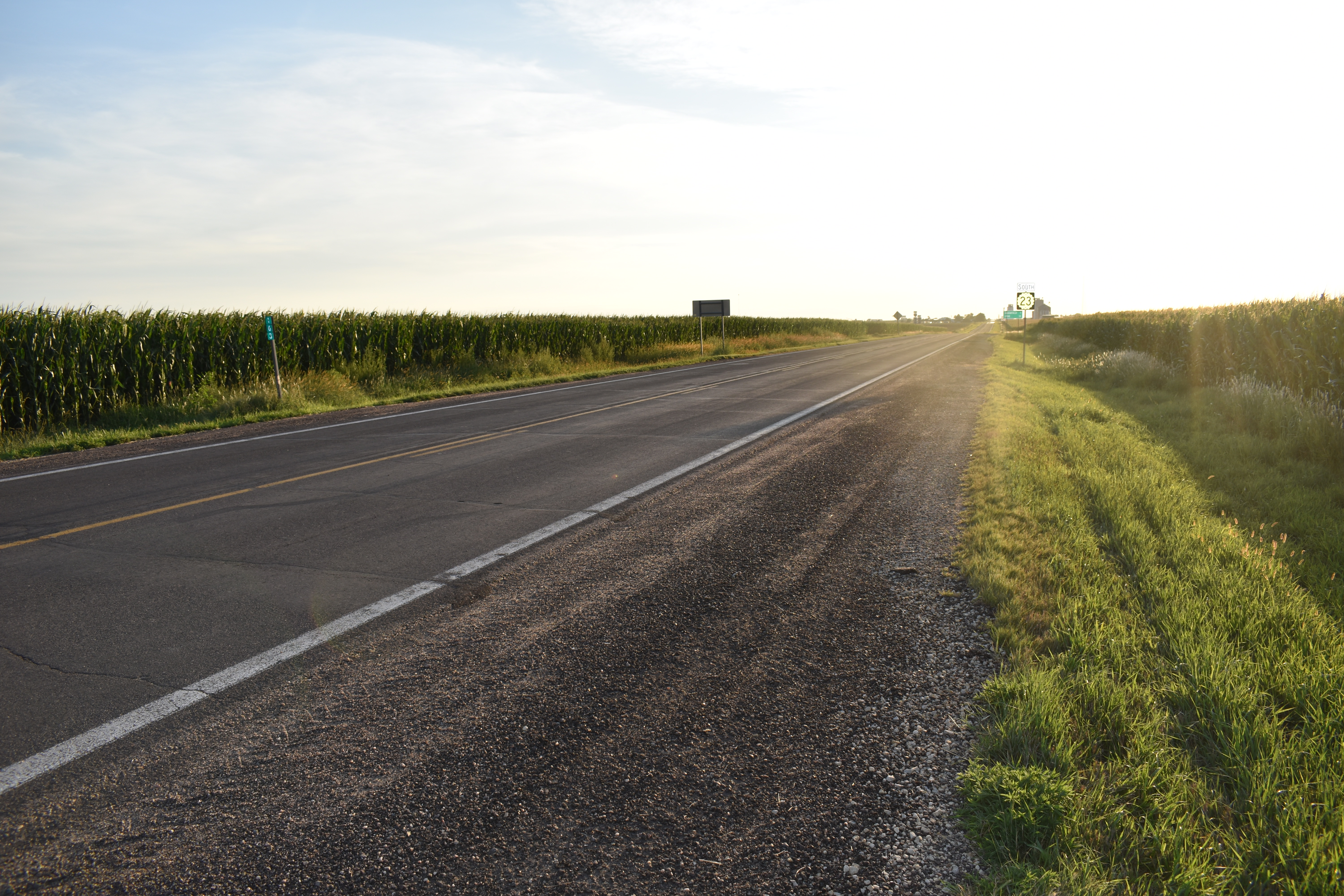
K-23 southbound from K-23 Spur

About 3.2 miles (5.1 km) into Gove County K-23 crosses the Smoky Hill River, then Plum Creek about 1.3 miles (2.1 km) later. The highway continues northward for about 13 miles (21 km) then enters the city of Gove, becoming Broad Street. The highway exits the city, and after roughly 3.8 miles (6.1 km) crosses Spring Creek. K-23 continues north for 2.8 miles (4.5 km), crosses Big Creek, then North Fork Big Creek 2.3 miles (3.7 km) later. The road soon reaches a diamond interchange with I-70 and US-40 at exit 93. Just north of the interchange K-23 turns east and begins to follow the old US-40 along the south edge of Grainfield. The highway soon intersects K-23 Alternate, also known as Main Street, which turns north and serves the city of Grainfield. K-23 continues east and soon reaches a junction with K-23 Spur, which travels south to I-70 and US-40. Here, K-23 turns north off of old US-40 and has an at-grade crossing with a Union Pacific Railroad track.

K-23 then continues north through rural farmlands and intersects the northern terminus of K-23 Alternate, about 0.8 miles (1.3 km) later. After about one mile (1.6 km) the highway crosses into Sheridan County, as the rolling hills begin to alternate with the flatter land. About two miles (3.2 km) into the county, the highway crosses Saline River. Roughly 4.9 miles (7.9 km) later the roadway crosses Midway Draw, then South Fork Solomon River about 4.6 miles (7.4 km) later. K-23 continues north for about 3.4 miles (5.5 km) then enters the city of Hoxie becoming Main Street. A few blocks into the city, is an intersection with US-24, also known as Oak Avenue. As K-23 exits the city it passes by Hoxie Cemetery and soon crosses South Bow Creek. After about 6.5 miles (10.5 km) further north the highway crosses North Fork Solomon River. K-23 continues for 2.3 miles (3.7 km) then intersects K-123, which travels north toward K-9's western terminus. Here, K-23 turns west and intersects K-223 roughly one mile (1.6 km) later. The highway continues for about four miles (6.4 km) then curves north and reaches its northern terminus at US-83 and K-383.

== History ==
=== Early roads ===
Before state highways were numbered in Kansas there were auto trails, which were an informal network of marked routes that existed in the United States and Canada in the early part of the 20th century. In Meade K-23 crosses the former Atlantic and Pacific Highway, which connected New York City on the Atlantic Ocean with Los Angeles on the Pacific Ocean. Then in Cimarron the highway crosses the former National Old Trails Road, Old Santa Fe Trail, New Santa Fe Trail and Albert Pike Highway. Further north in Dighton K-23 crosses the former Kansas-Colorado Boulevard. The overlap with K-4 follows the former Bee Line, which began in Scott City and went east to Herington. By Grainfield, the section that follows old US-40 is the former Golden Belt, which began in Denver and went east to Kansas City. A section from Hoxie southward along K-23 follows the former Roosevelt National Highway. Farther north in Hoxie, K-23 crosses the former Kansas White Way, which began in Colorado Springs and went east to St. Joseph, and former Blue Line, which began in Limon and went east to Junction City. The northern terminus connects to the former Pikes Peak Ocean to Ocean Highway, which was formed in 1912, and went from New York City to Los Angeles.

=== Establishment ===
K-20
- Location: Dighton–Hoxie
- Existed: 1926–1927

In a June 4, 1923 meeting of the Lane County commissioners, it was approved to add the road from Dighton to Shields to the state highway system, to receive state aid funding. The section of K-23 from Dighton north to Hoxie was first designated as K-20 in 1926. By 1927, it was renumbered as K-23 and extended north through Dresden and Oberlin, to the Nebraska state line. By 1930, US-36 was realigned to go west into Colorado, and the old portion of US-36 through Dresden became US-83. By 1931, K-23 was truncated to US-83 in Dresden. At this time US-183 was created, which followed the former K-23, from US-83 in Dresden to Nebraska. In February 1929, representatives from Meade, Gray, Finney, and Lane counties requested that the state extend K-23 southward to the Oklahoma border. Then on February 27, 1930, a delegation from Lane County, requested Finney County to build a section of roadway to complete the link between Garden City and Dighton. They believed that this route would be most logical route to be accepted into the state highway system to complete the link. By 1932, the southern terminus was extended from Dighton southward to US-50N west of Kalvesta (modern K-156). K-23 then continued south to US-50S in Cimarron (modern US-50/US-400), then to K-45 west of Ensign (modern US-56). From here it continued south and ended at US-54 and US-160 in Meade. Then by 1937, the southern terminus was extended to just south of Crooked Creek, where it ended and continued as a locally maintained road to the Oklahoma border.

=== Realignments ===
By January 1938, the southern terminus of US-183 was moved southwest of Dresden, and K-23's northern terminus became solely US-83. Between July 1938 and 1939, US-183 was realigned to go east from Oberlin along US-36. At this time K-23 was realigned to follow K-9 west to US-83, then followed the former US-183 north to Oberlin. By 1940, K-123 was created to replace the former K-23 from K-9 north to Dresden. In November 1939, a group of Highway 83 Association members from Oberlin, Garden City and Liberal began to discuss with the State Highway Commission about the proposed rerouting of US-83 in northern Kansas. Between 1941 and 1944, the alignments of US-183 and US-83 were swapped within Nebraska. At this time, K-23 was truncated to its current northern terminus, with US-83 replacing it from there north to US-36 in Oberlin. Also the old alignment of US-83 from here to Nebraska became US-383, now K-383. Between 1944 and 1945, K-9 was realigned to end at US-83 in Dresden, which eliminated the overlap with K-23.

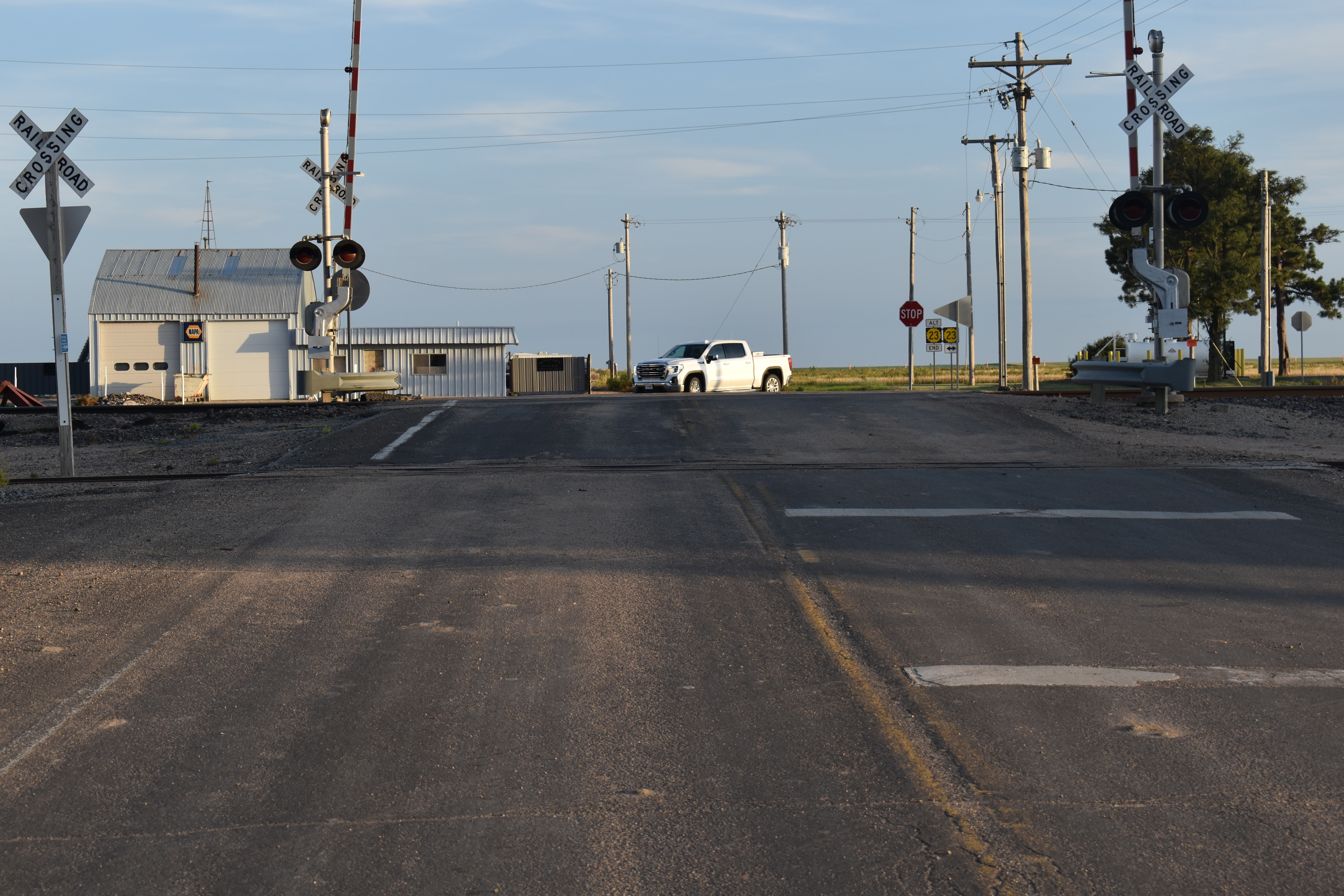
K-23 Alternate at its southern terminus

In late June 1928, the State Highway Commission accepted a bid of $9811.86 (equivalent to $183,972 in 2025) to build a 227.5-foot-long (69.3 m) concrete bridge over the Smoky Hill River. This bridge was rehabilitated in 1936, then replaced in 1994. In an October 11, 1935 resolution, K-23 was slightly realigned near Gove. In a January 11, 1938 resolution, it was approved to realign K-23 by Shields to be part of the proposed relocation of K-4. K-23 previously had turned west at modern County Route 230, then north at modern Jagger Road. The realignment of K-23 was completed between 1939 and 1940, and the relocation of K-4 was completed between 1945 and 1948. In an August 7, 1941 resolution, it was approved to realign a roughly three miles (4.8 km) segment of K-23 about one mile (1.6 km) to the east between the North Fork Solomon River and K-9 to straighten the alignment. The realignment was completed between 1944 and 1945. In a May 8, 1957 resolution, it was realigned slightly on the north side of Gove to eliminate two sharp curves. In a June 25, 1958 resolution, K-23 Alternate was designated as an alternate route through the city of Grainfield.

In a December 9, 1959 resolution, it was approved to extend I-70 west from Collyer to K-23, along with US-40 being realigned onto it. Also K-23 Spur was to be built from the new I-70 and US-40 north to K-23. Then on April 21, 1960, bids were opened for the new section of I-70 and for K-23 Spur. The section of I-70 from K-23 east to the Trego County line was supposed to open in mid December 1961, but was cancelled due to heavy snowfall. It was not until June 15, 1962, that the new section was able to open. I-70 was extended west from K-23 to Colby by 1965.

=== Extension and improvements ===
K-98
- Location: Meade State Park–K-23
- Existed: August 25, 1939–March 8, 1961

In a February 25, 1959 meeting, it was approved to extend K-23 south into Oklahoma. On December 11, 1959, the Kansas and Oklahoma highway commissions held a joint meeting in Wichita. At that meeting, the Kansas Highway Commission resolved to connect K-23 with SH-23 to establish a "route number common to both states". By February 6, 1961, the roadway had been brought up to state highway standards and in a March 8, 1961 resolution, K-23 was realigned to follow the former K-98 to Meade State Lake then south over a previously unnumbered roadway to the Oklahoma border. On August 31, 1961, bids were accepted for a project to improve this new 8.9-mile (14.3 km) section of K-23, including the building of two new bridges. In June 1961, it was announced that K-23 would be upgraded in the city of Dighton, including widening in certain areas and repaving. Before 1990, K-23 continued directly west to US-83 at its northern terminus. Then in a March 12, 1990 resolution, US-83 was realigned and at that time K-23 was realigned to curve north then intersect US-83 northeast of Selden.

== Major intersections ==
County	Location	mi	km	Destinations	Notes
Meade	Cimarron Township	0.000	0.000	SH-23 south	Continuation into Oklahoma
Meade	Meade	26.474	42.606	US-54 / US-160 (Carthage Street) – Liberal, Ashland, Greensburg	
Meade	Crooked Creek Township	33.557	54.005	K-98 east (G Road) – Fowler	Western terminus of K-98
Gray	Montezuma Township	50.130	80.676	US-56 – Dodge City, Sublette	
Gray	Cimarron	62.622	100.780	US-50 / US-400 (Avenue A)	
Finney	Garfield Township	80.207	129.081	K-156 east – Jetmore	Southern end of concurrency with K-156
Finney	Garfield Township	86.187	138.705	K-156 west – Garden City	Northern end of concurrency with K-156
Lane	Dighton	115.372	185.673	K-96 (Long Street)	
Lane	Shields	124.336	200.099	K-4 east	Southern end of concurrency with K-4
Lane	Wilson Township	126.352	203.344	K-4 west	Northern end of concurrency with K-4
Gove	Grainfield Township	160.927	258.987	I-70 / US-40 – Oakley, Wakeeney	I-70 exit 93; diamond interchange
Gove	Grainfield	161.814	260.414	K-23 Alt. north (Main Street)	Southern terminus of K-23 Alt.
Gove	Grainfield Township	163.059	262.418	K-23 Spur to I-70 / US-40	Northern terminus of K-23 Spur; I-70 exit 95
Gove	Grainfield Township	163.829	263.657	K-23 Alt. south	Northern terminus of K-23 Alt.
Sheridan	Hoxie	180.300	290.165	US-24 (Oak Avenue) – Colby, Hill City	
Sheridan	Union–Sheridan township line	193.774	311.849	K-123 north to K-9 east	Southern terminus of K-123
Sheridan	Sheridan Township	194.815	313.524	K-223 north – Leoville	Southern terminus of K-223
Sheridan	Sheridan Township	199.117	320.448	US-83 / K-383 north – Oberlin, Oakley, Norton	Northern terminus; southern terminus of K-383; highway continues as US-83 north
1.000 mi = 1.609 km; 1.000 km = 0.621 mi: Concurrency terminus

== Related routes ==
=== K-23 Alternate ===
K-23 Alternate
- Location: Grainfield
- Length: 1.828 mi (2.942 km)
- Existed: June 25, 1958–present

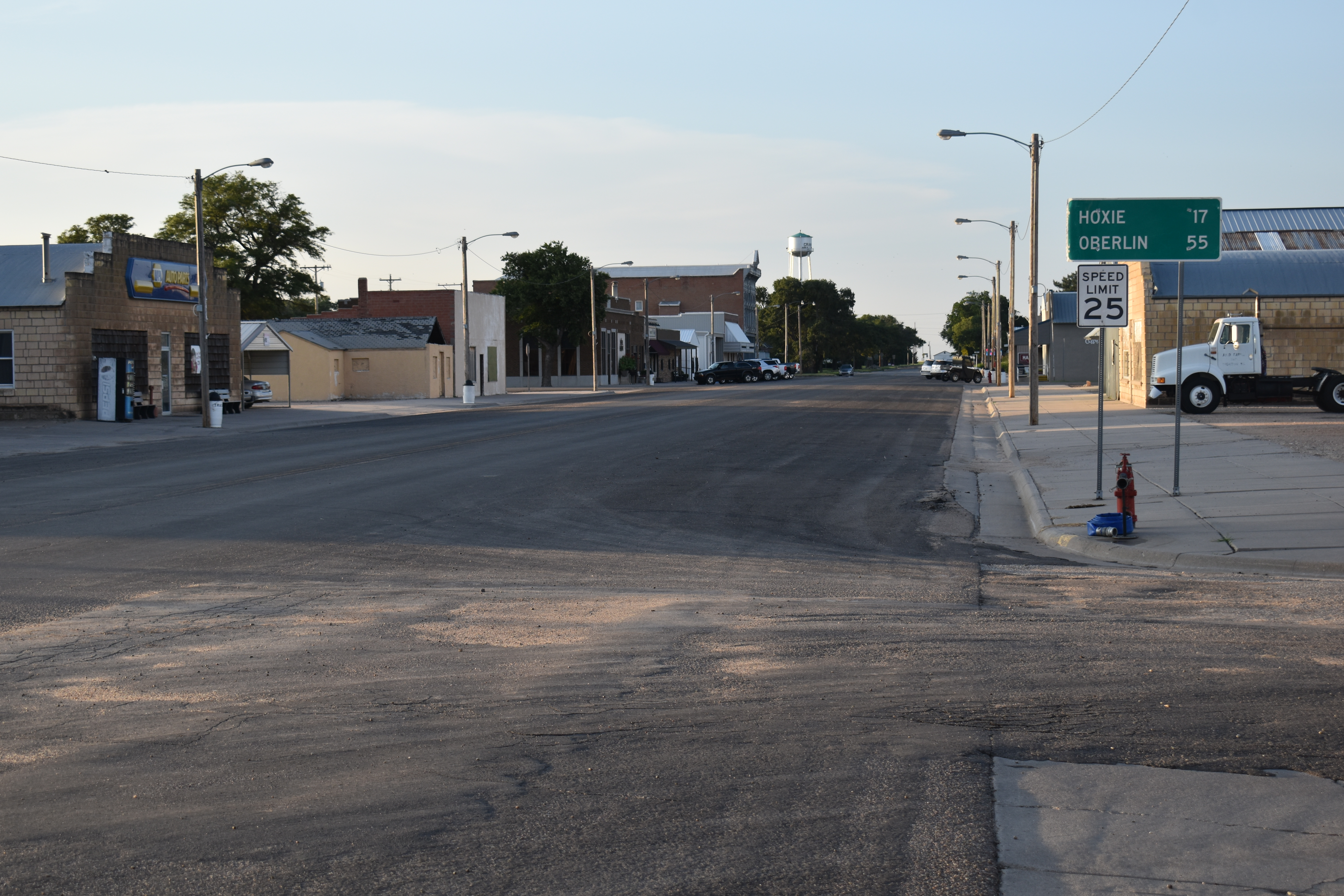
K-23 Alt. northbound entering Grainfield

K-23 Alternate starts at the intersection of K-23 on the southern edge of Grainfield. It heads north and crosses a Union Pacific Railroad track as it enters the city. The highway continues through the city along Main Street. Just north of the city limits, the route turns to the east and ends at the mainline K-23. K-23 Alternate was designated in a June 25, 1958 resolution, and ran from K-23 west, along the north side of the city to Main Street.

Major junctions
The entire route is in Gove County.

Location	mi	km	Destinations	Notes
Grainfield	0.000	0.000	K-23	Southern terminus
Grainfield Township	1.828	2.942	K-23	Northern terminus
1.000 mi = 1.609 km; 1.000 km = 0.621 mi

=== K-23 Spur ===
K-23 Spur
- Location: Near Grainfield
- Length: 0.30 mi (480 m)
- Existed: December 9, 1959–present

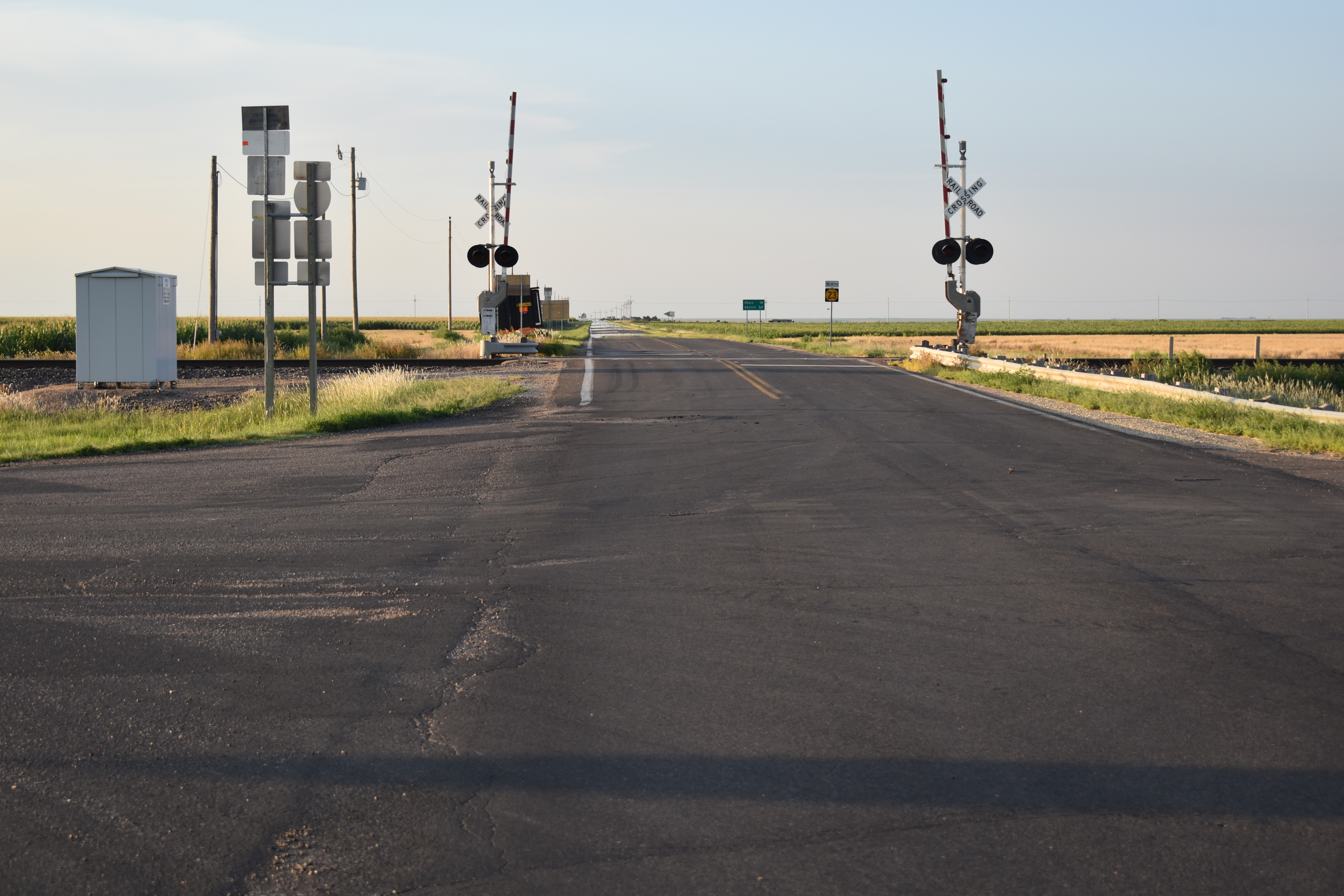
K-23 northbound from K-23 Spur

K-23 Spur is a 0.3-mile-long (0.5 km) connection between K-23 and I-70 / US 40 near Grainfield. In a December 9, 1959 resolution, the future I-70 was to be built along with US-40 being realigned onto it, at this time K-23 Spur was designated from I-70 and US-40 north to K-23. I-70 was extended from Collyer west to K-23 on June 15, 1962, and then farther west to Colby by 1965.

Major junctions
The entire route is in Gove Township, Gove County.

mi	km	Destinations	Notes
0.000	0.000	I-70 / US-40 – WaKeeney, Oakley	Southern terminus; I-70 exit 95; diamond interchange
0.300	0.483	K-23 – Grainfield, Hoxie	Northern terminus
1.000 mi = 1.609 km; 1.000 km = 0.621 mi

== See also ==
- List of state highways in Kansas
- List of state highway spurs in Kansas
