= K98 =

K98 or K-98 may refer to:

- K-98 (Kansas highway), a state highway in Kansas
- K-98 (1939–1961 Kansas highway), a former state highway in Kansas
- Karabiner 98k, a rifle
