= K-98 (Kansas highway) =

State highway in Kansas, U.S.

K-98
- K-98 highlighted in red

Route information
- Maintained by KDOT and the city of Fowler
- Length: 9.048 mi (14.561 km)
- History: Established as K-56 on July 1, 1937; renumbered to K-98 c. 1956

Major junctions
- West end: K-23 north of Meade
- East end: US-54 south of Fowler

Location
- Country: United States
- State: Kansas
- Counties: Meade

Highway system
- Kansas State Highway System; Interstate; US; State; Spurs
← K-97	→ K-98

K-98 is a 9.048-mile-long (14.561 km) state highway in the U.S. state of Kansas. Entirely within Meade County, K-98's western terminus is at K-23 north of Meade, and its eastern terminus is at U.S. Route 54 (US-54) south of Fowler. With the exception of the eastern end, the highway travels through flat farmland and is a two-lane road for its entire length.

The highway that is now K-98 was designated as K-56 on July 1, 1937. In 1953, the highway was extended south to a new alignment of US-54. K-56 was redesignated as K-98 between 1956 and 1957 to avoid confusion with US-56. The highway was paved by 1957. The original K-98 was designated on July 1, 1937, and went from K-23 west to Meade State Park. On March 8, 1961, K-23 was realigned to follow the former K-98 to Meade State Lake then south over a previously unnumbered roadway to the Oklahoma border, which eliminated that K-98.

== Route description ==
K-98's western terminus is at K-23 north of Meade. The highway begins travelling east along G Road through flat farmland, characteristic of the Great Plains. The roadway crosses an unnamed creek then begins to enter the Artesian Valley as it proceeds east. K-98 continues through farmland before reaching a crossing over Crooked Creek. Soon after, the roadway enters the city of Fowler as Tenth Avenue. Approximately 0.25 miles (0.40 km) into the city the highway turns south onto Main Street. K-98 continues south as it passes by two schools, city hall and post office. The highway exits the city and reaches an at-grade crossing with a Union Pacific Railway track. K-98 then reaches its eastern terminus at US-54 roughly 0.25 miles (0.40 km) later.

The Kansas Department of Transportation (KDOT) tracks the traffic levels on its highways. On K-98 in 2020, they determined that on average the traffic varied from 285 vehicles per day west of Fowler to 875 vehicles per day between Fowler and US-54. K-98 connects to the National Highway System at its eastern terminus. All but 0.608 miles (1 km) of K-98's alignment is maintained by KDOT. The entire section within Fowler is maintained by the city.

== History ==
The highway that is now K-98 was designated as K-56 on July 1, 1937. In a resolution passed on August 26, 1953, it was approved to build a new alignment of US-54 south of Fowler, and to extend K-56 to it. On October 20, 1953, the SHC approved bids of $24,550 (equivalent to $229,206 in 2024 dollars) for grading, $12,100 (equivalent to $112,969 in 2024 dollars) for two box bridges, $1,320 (equivalent to $12,324 in 2024 dollars) for seeding on the project. K-56 was redesignated as K-98 between 1956 and 1957 to avoid confusion with US-56. The highway was paved by 1957. On August 21, 1957, the SHC approved a bid of $42,460 (equivalent to $361,457 in 2024 dollars) for subgrade modification and an asphalt surface on K-98 from Fowler west to K-23.

The original K-98 was designated on July 1, 1937, and went from K-23 west to Meade State Park. On December 11, 1959, the Kansas and Oklahoma highway commissions held a joint meeting in Wichita. At that meeting, the Kansas Highway Commission resolved to connect K-23 with SH-23 to establish a "route number common to both states". By February 6, 1961, the roadway had been brought up to state highway standards and in a March 8, 1961 resolution, K-23 was realigned to follow the former K-98 to Meade State Lake then south over a previously unnumbered roadway to the Oklahoma border.

== Major intersections ==
The entire route is in Meade County.

Location	mi	km	Destinations	Notes
Crookfield Creek Township	0.000	0.000	K-23 (18 Road) – Cimarron, Meade	Western terminus
Fowler Township	9.048	14.561	US-54 – Minneola, Meade	Eastern terminus
1.000 mi = 1.609 km; 1.000 km = 0.621 mi
