= Elmwood, Oklahoma =

Unincorporated community in Oklahoma, US

- Unincorporated community
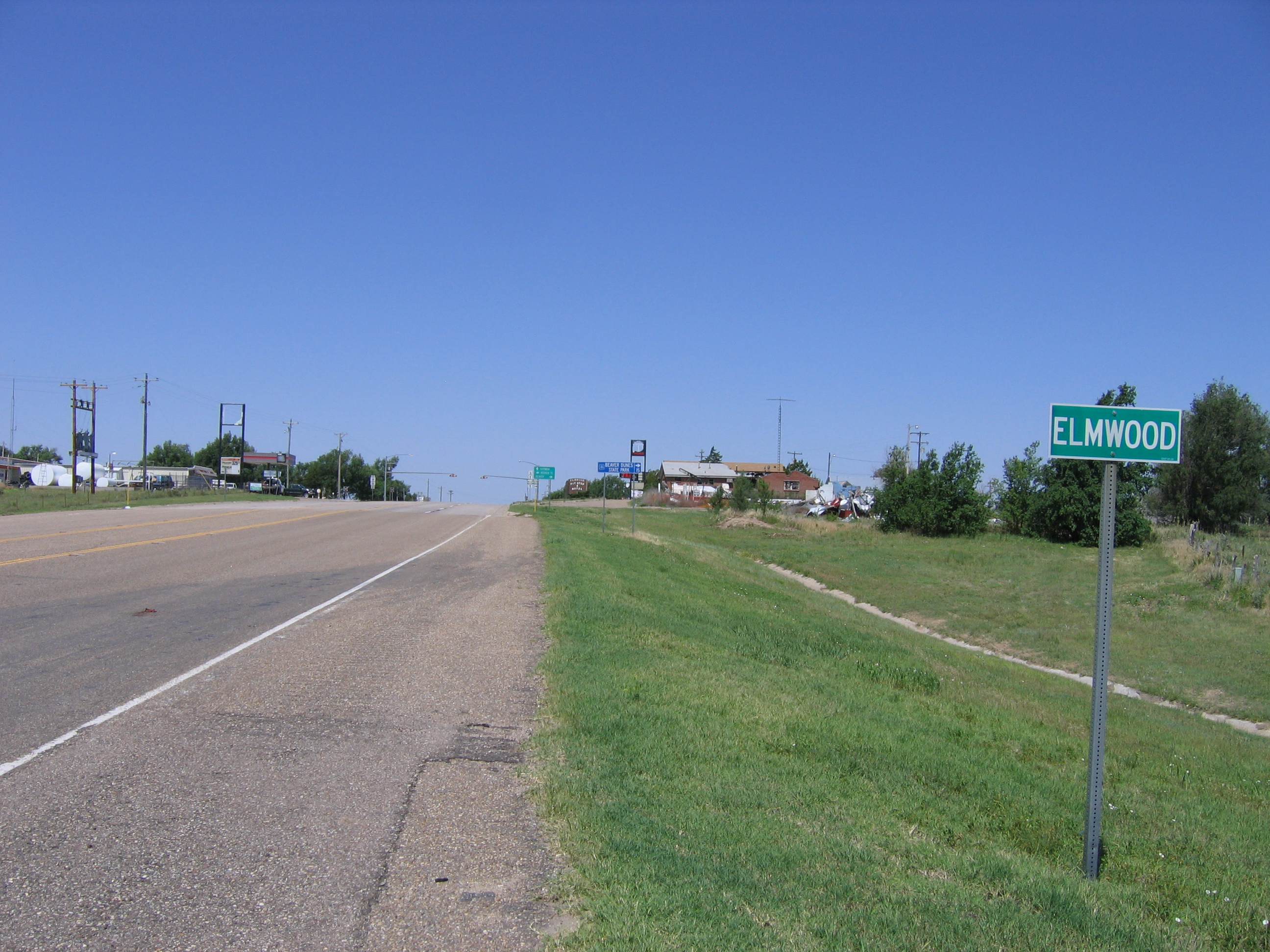
- Elmwood in June 2007

- Location within the state of Oklahoma Elmwood, Oklahoma (the United States)
- Coordinates: 36°36′59″N 100°31′23″W
- Country: United States
- State: Oklahoma
- County: Beaver
- Time zone: UTC-6 (Central (CST))
  - Summer (DST): UTC-5 (CDT)

Elmwood is an unincorporated community in Beaver County, Oklahoma, United States. It is located at the junction of U.S. 412 and U.S 270 (Oklahoma State Highway 23 south of 412).

== History ==
Elmwood's post office was opened on January 26, 1888.

The Thomas Site Historical Marker, related to the Jones and Plummer Trail, is just west of town.
