= Eddie Tucker =

American baseball player (born 1966)

- Catcher
- Born: November 18, 1966 (age 59); Greenville, Mississippi, U.S.
- Batted: Right Threw: Right

MLB debut
- June 14, 1992, for the Houston Astros

Last MLB appearance
- June 24, 1995, for the Cleveland Indians

MLB statistics
- Batting average: .126
- Home runs: 1
- Runs batted in: 7
- Stats at Baseball Reference

Teams
- Houston Astros (1992–1993, 1995); Cleveland Indians (1995)

Eddie Jack "Scooter" Tucker (born November 18, 1966) is an American former Major League Baseball catcher. Originally drafted by the San Francisco Giants in 1988, Tucker broke into the big leagues with the Houston Astros in 1992 and also played parts of the 1993 and 1995 seasons with the Astros. In 1995 the Astros traded him to the Cleveland Indians for pitcher Matt Williams. He played college baseball for Delta State University.

== Early life ==
Eddie Jack Turner was born in Greenville, Mississippi, on November 18, 1966, to Nolan and Jacqueline Tucker (née Pope). Nolan served as a terminal manager for Chevron Corporation and U.S. Gypsum while Jacqueline worked as a bookkeeper for an Otasco store. Nolan and Jacqueline also had a younger daughter named Stephanie.

Tucker began playing baseball at six years old, largely due to his father's avid fandom. By ten years old, he regularly played at the catcher position. He attended the private Washington School in Greenville. There, he was a standout at football and baseball. As an end, he was a three-year letterman in football, winning All-Conference honors in two seasons and All-State honors in his senior season. In baseball, he was a four-year letterman, won All-Conference honors three times and also won All-State honors as a senior. His jersey number was retired by Washington's baseball team. He graduated in 1985.

== College and draft ==
Following his graduation, Tucker chose to play for the Division II Delta State Statesmen of Delta State University in Cleveland, Mississippi, as they offered him a full scholarship to play baseball. He was named as the team's most outstanding freshman following a 1986 season in which he posted a .344 batting average, which he improved upon with a .381 average in his sophomore season and a .356 in his junior year. In his collegiate career, he was a three-time All-Gulf South Conference honoree from 1986 to 1988. He attributed much of his success to the coaching of Dave Ferriss.

Tucker was selected by the San Francisco Giants in the fifth round of the 1988 Major League Baseball draft.

== Professional career ==
=== San Francisco Giants ===
Tucker was first assigned to the Class-A Short Season Everett Giants in the Northwest League for the 1988 season. He posted a .261 batting average with 40 hits and three home runs and was named to the post-season league all-star team. The following season, Tucker was promoted to the Class-A Clinton Giants of the Midwest League. In May, The Quad-City Times described Tucker as one of the "bright spots at the plate" for a Giants team that struggled with hitting. He finished with a team-leading .246 average with three home runs and 43 runs batted in. In 1990, Tucker was assigned to the Class-A Advanced San Jose Giants of the California League. He was named to that year's league All-Star Game in June and posted a .280 average with five home runs and 71 runs batted in for the season. He also threw out over half of potential base stealers, successfully nabbing 59 out of 117 runners. Following the season, Tucker was placed on the Giants' 40-man roster in November.

In March 1991, Tucker was assigned to the Double-A Shreveport Captains in the Texas League. Prior to the season, Captains manager Bill Evans noted that Tucker "does a good job of taking charge on the field" and that "catching will definitely be a strength" for the Captains. He helped lead his team to a finals appearance with a season in which he posted a .284 average with 49 runs batted in and 29 doubles. He led the league with a .995 fielding average and 70 assists en route to a Texas League All-Star Game selection. On September 12, Tucker's Captains won the Texas League championship for the second year in a row, defeating the El Paso Diablos in the finals. One week later, Tucker was dropped from the Giants' 40-man roster to make room for shortstop Royce Clayton.

=== Houston Astros ===
The Houston Astros claimed Tucker off waivers in September 1991, following his season with the Captains. Following the move, Tucker said that "I think I will definitely get a better opportunity to move up with Houston" and added that manager Bill Wood had scouted him over the past year. Tucker started the 1992 season with the Triple-A Tucson Toros, where he posted a .329 average with 29 runs batted in before called up to the major leagues on June 12, with catcher Eddie Taubensee sent down in a corresponding move. Four days later, Tucker recorded his first major league hit against the San Diego Padres as part of a three-hit performance. On July 21, Tucker was optioned back down to Tucson, before being called up again on September 7.

Prior to a March 15, 1993 spring training game in Kissimmee, Florida, Tucker caught a first pitch ball from president George W. Bush. After the fact, Tucker called it "the most delightful surprise" of his baseball career. Tucker spent much of the 1993 season in Tucson, helping the team win the Pacific Coast League. Following the championship win, Tucker was called up to the major league squad on September 14, alongside pitcher Jeff Juden, first baseman Jim Lindeman, and utility player Mike Brumley.

=== Cleveland Indians ===
On May 15, 1995, the Astros traded Tucker to the Cleveland Indians in exchange for pitcher Matt Williams. He appeared in 17 games for the Indians in the 1995 season, recording zero hits in twenty at-bats.

=== Atlanta Braves ===
The Atlanta Braves claimed Tucker off waivers from the Indians on June 29, 1995.

Tucker played in 744 minor league games across nine seasons, posting a .276 average with 32 home runs and 342 RBIs. He played in 51 major league games, posting a .126 average with one home run and seven RBI.

== Post-playing career ==
After his playing career, Tucker served as a representative for Fleetwood Enterprises, a recreational vehicle manufacturer. He was named to Delta State Athletics' Hall of Fame in 2002.

Tucker missed baseball, saying in an interview with The News-Herald that his "itch to get back into baseball turned into a rash." In 2007, Tucker began a two-year stint as a bench coach for the Pensacola Pelicans of the independent American Association. He served as a scout for the New York Mets in 2010 and 2011. In 2012, Tucker became the hitting instructor for the Class-A Advanced Carolina Mudcats, thanks in part to his friendship with former Indians player Travis Fryman, who at the time served as a minor league special assistant for the Indians organization. The following year, he was named the manager of the Indians Class-A affiliate, the Lake County Captains of the Midwest League. In 2014, he moved back to the Carolina Mudcats to serve as the team's manager. Tucker served as the Indians' minor league catching coordinator during the 2015 and 2016 seasons. In that role, he worked with minor league prospects across the Indians' minor league system, including Martin Červenka and current major leaguer Francisco Mejía.

== Personal life ==
The nickname "Scooter" came from Tucker's grandfather, who upon his birth started calling him by the moniker. "I'm not sure why he did," Tucker said in an interview with the Society for American Baseball Research, "he must have thought I was going to be faster than I am." He added that "I was in the second grade before I knew my name was Eddie." In a 1993 interview with The Orlando Sentinel, he further stated that "my best friends don't know that Eddie is my name and I've been Scooter so long I wouldn't know to answer to Eddie."

Tucker married Teresa Coghlan, whom he met at Delta State, in 1991. Together, they have had four daughters.
