= Beaver County Courthouse =

Beaver County Courthouse may refer to:

- Beaver County Courthouse (Oklahoma), Beaver City, Oklahoma
- Beaver County Courthouse (Utah), Beaver, Utah
