= Beaver Independent School District =

School district in Oklahoma

Coordinates: 36.810035°N 100.523571°W

Address
- 807 Avenue G Beaver, Oklahoma, 73932; United States

District information
- Type: Public
- Grades: PreK-12
- Established: 1886; 140 years ago
- NCES District ID: 4003750

Other information
- Website: www.beaver.k12.ok.us

Beaver High School

Location
- 807 Avenue G Beaver, (Beaver County), Oklahoma 73932; United States

Information
- Type: Public high school
- Principal: McKenzie Leisher
- Staff: 6.90 (FTE)
- Enrollment: 71 (2023-24)
- Student to teacher ratio: 10.29
- Colors: Black and gold
- Nickname: Dusters
- Website: Beaver High School

The Beaver Independent School District is a school district based in Beaver, Oklahoma, United States. It contains an elementary school and a combined middle/high school.

== See also ==
List of school districts in Oklahoma
