= Presbyterian Church (Beaver, Oklahoma) =

Historic church in Oklahoma, United States

- U.S. National Register of Historic Places
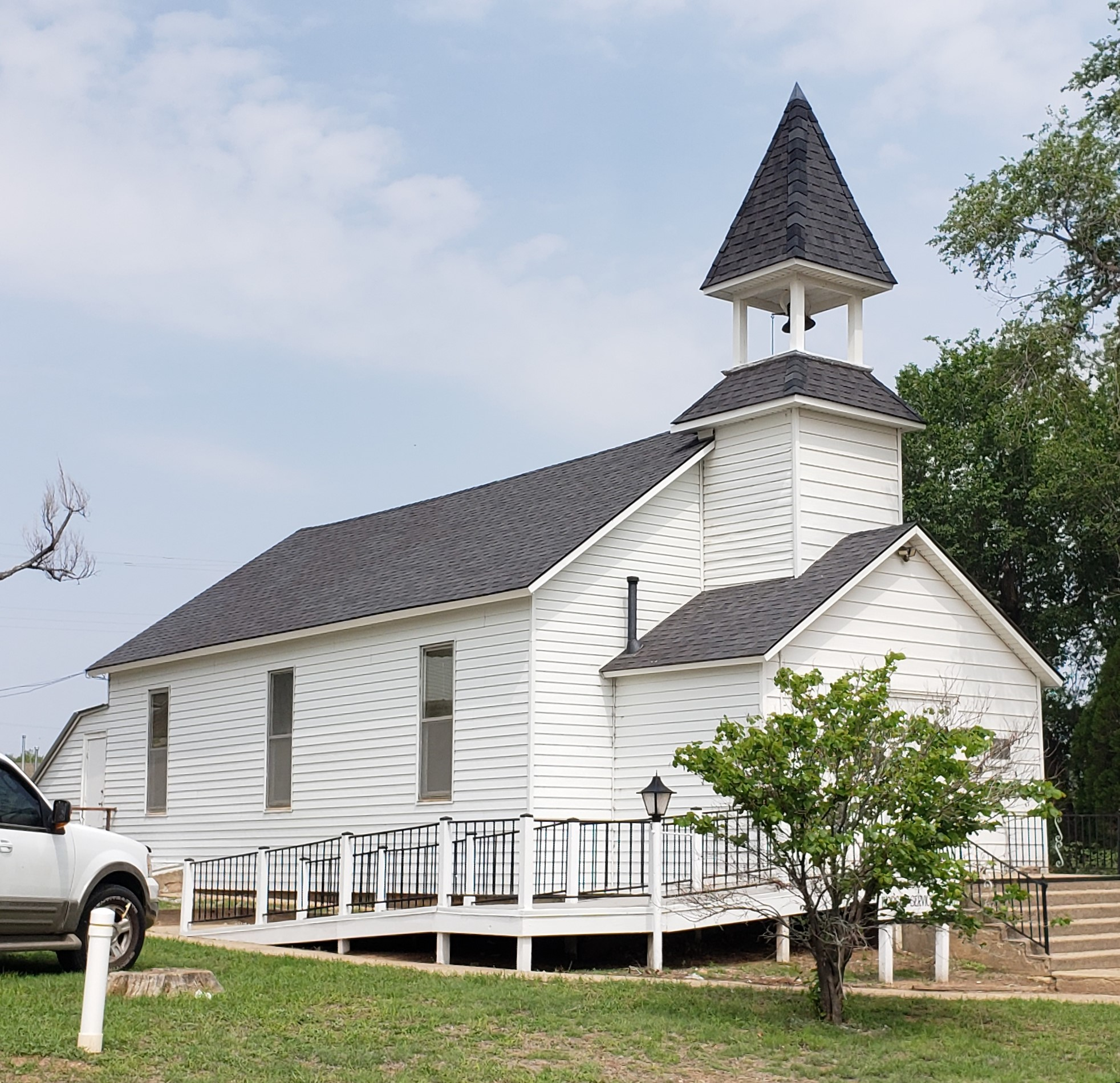

- Location within Oklahoma Location within the United States
- Location: 3rd St. and Ave. E, Beaver City, Oklahoma
- Coordinates: 36°48′50.98″N 100°31′13.01″W
- Built: 1887
- NRHP reference No.: 74001655
- Added to NRHP: May 16, 1974

The Presbyterian Church building in Beaver, Oklahoma, is a historic church building built in 1887. It was one of the earliest permanent religious buildings built in the Oklahoma Panhandle. The church is a wood-frame structure with a front gable roof and small bell tower over the front entrance. It was listed on the National Register of Historic Places on May 16, 1974, for architectural significance and association with settlement of the area.

It is located at 3rd St. and Ave. E in Beaver.
