= Oklahoma State Highway 23 =

State highway in Oklahoma, United States

State Highway 23

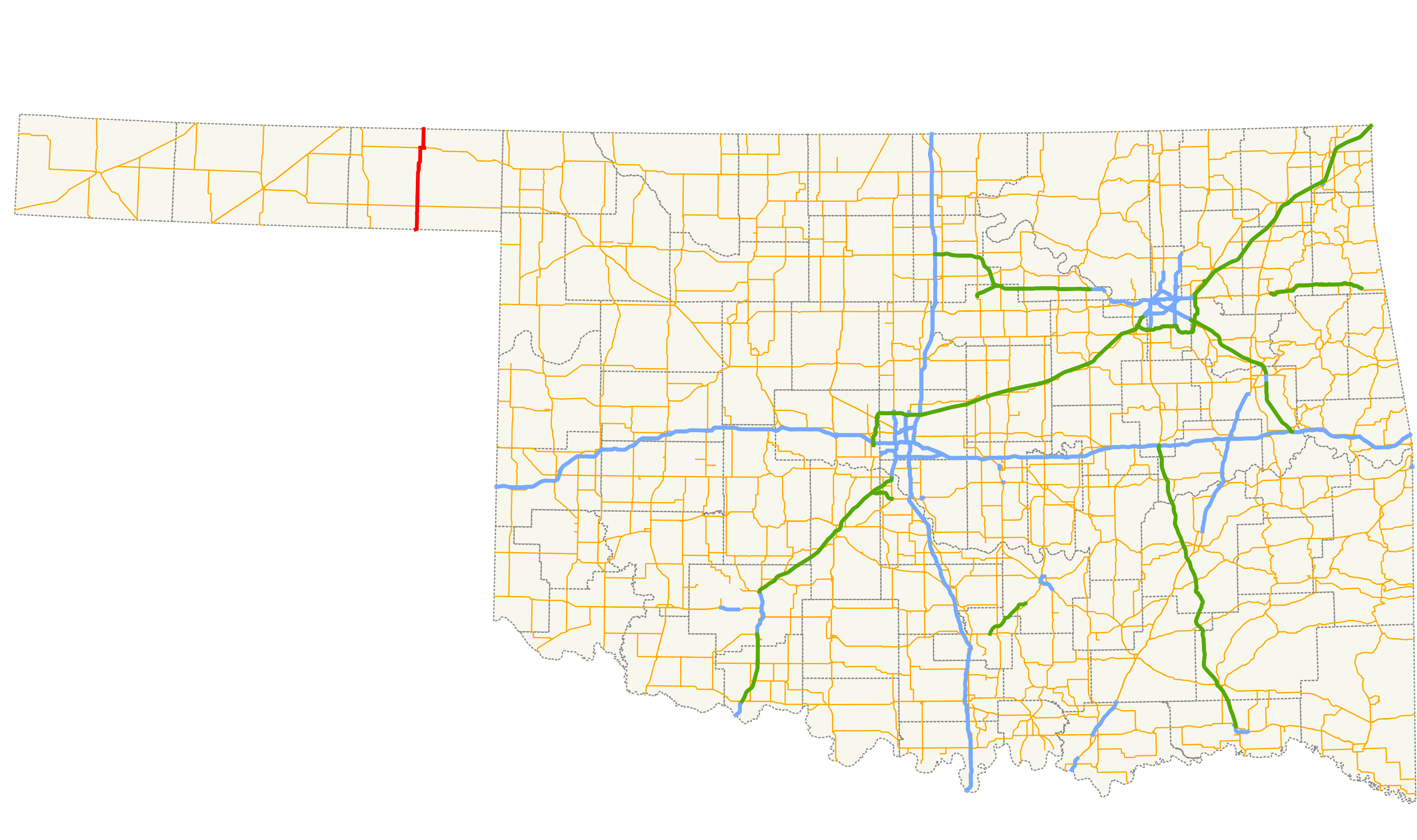

Route information
- Maintained by ODOT
- Length: 36.2 mi (58.3 km)

Major junctions
- South end: SH 23 at the Texas state line near Booker, TX
- US 270 / US 412 / SH-3 at Elmwood; US 64 near Forgan
- North end: K-23 at the Kansas state line near Forgan

Location
- Country: United States
- State: Oklahoma

Highway system
- Oklahoma State Highway System; Interstate; US; State; Turnpikes
← SH-22	→ SH-24

State Highway 23 (SH-23 or OK-23) is a state highway in Oklahoma. It runs 36.2 miles south-to-north through the center of Beaver County, in the Panhandle, running from the Texas state line to the Kansas state line.

There are no letter-suffixed spur highways branching from SH-23.

== Route description ==
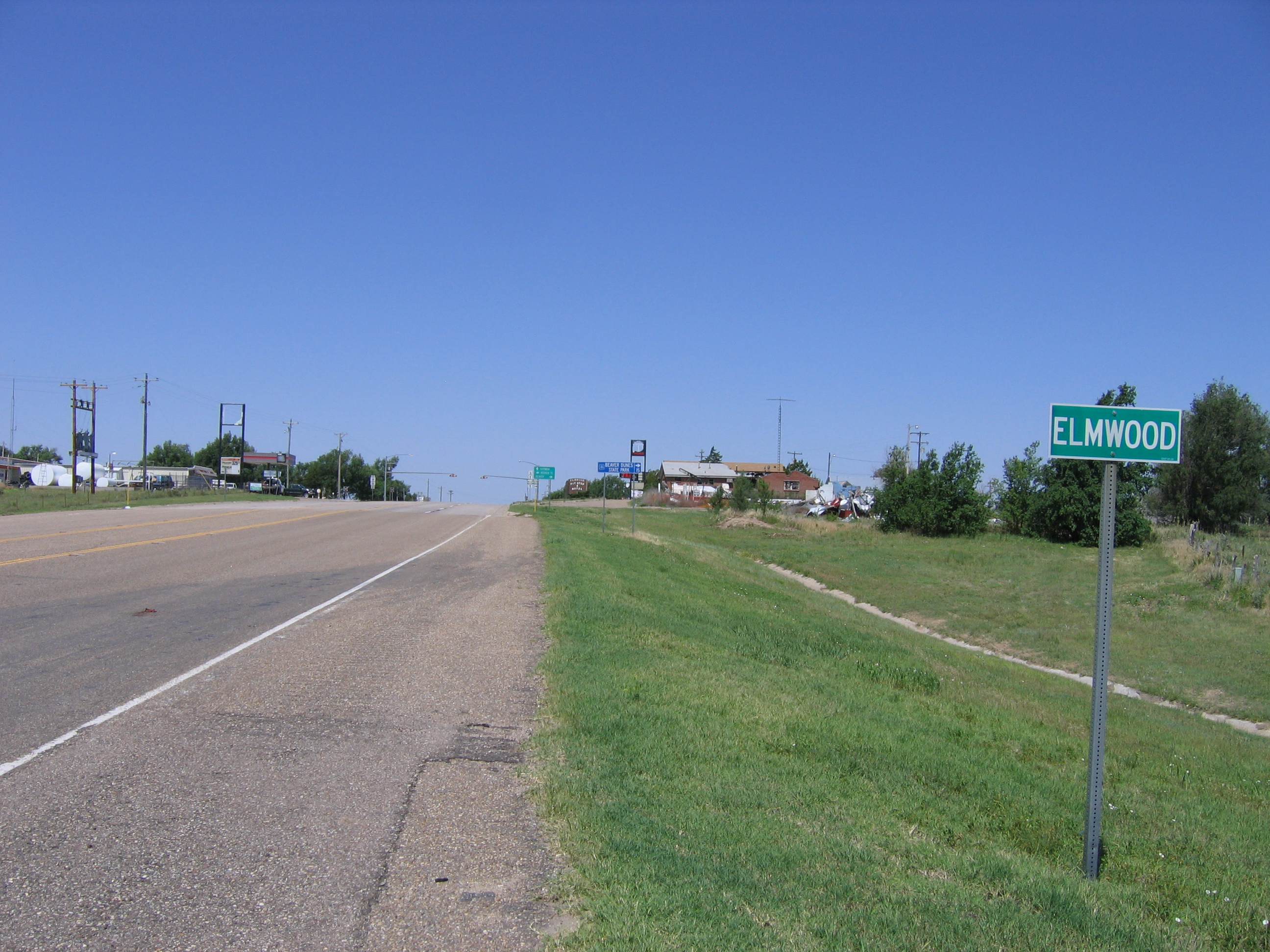
US-270/412/SH-3 meet SH-23 at Elmwood.

SH-23 begins at the Texas state line 3 miles (4.8 km) north of Booker, Texas. Upon entering Oklahoma, the highway makes a ninety degree turn to parallel the state line for approximately 1/2 mile (0.80 km), running just north of the line. It then turns back to the north and travels eight miles (13 km) due north to the intersection with US-270/US-412/SH-3, at the crossroads settlement of Elmwood. US-270 splits away from the other two highways at Elmwood, turning north to join SH-23.

A little over one mile (1.6 km) north of Elmwood. US-270/SH-23 cross over Clear Creek, a tributary of the North Canadian River. The two highways enter Beaver, the county seat of Beaver County, about 13 miles (21 km) north of Elmwood. Just north of Beaver, the highway crosses the Beaver River (another name for this portion of the North Canadian River). After crossing the river, US-270 and SH-23 pass through Beaver Dunes State Park.

Approximately six miles (9.7 km) north of Beaver, US-270 and SH-23 intersect US-64 and split up; US-270 turns west along US-64 towards Forgan, while SH-23 follows US-64 for about a mile eastbound. After splitting up, SH-23 turns due north, continuing to its terminus seven miles (11 km) later at the Kansas state line. North of the line it becomes K-23, which continues on to Meade, Kansas.

== History ==
Prior to SH-23's establishment, the highway carried two designations—US-270 followed the same portion of the route that it does today, and a segment of SH-15 connected Elmwood to the Texas state line. (A connection with the current western terminus of SH-15 was made with what was then Farm to Market Road 1265 to Booker and TX-117 back to Oklahoma.) The connection to Kansas north of US-64 did not exist as a state highway prior to 1957; it first appears on the 1958 state highway map, also signed as SH-15. The highway is not shown as overlapping US-64 and US-270 to Elmwood.

SH-23 is first shown replacing SH-15 on the 1959 map, implying the change took place in 1958. Again, SH-23 is not shown as overlapping US-270; it would not be shown as doing such until the 1975 edition.

K-23 was in existence as early as April 1940, shown with a spur ending north of the state line on Oklahoma's state map. On December 11, 1959, the Kansas and Oklahoma highway commissions held a joint meeting in Wichita, Kansas. At that meeting, the Kansas Highway Commission resolved to connect K-23 with OK-23 to establish a "route number...common to both states." K-23 was already shown on the Oklahoma highway map connecting to Oklahoma's SH-23 as early as the 1957 edition.

Similarly, the Texas Highway Commission ordered its State Highway 23 signed on January 25, 1959, alongside existing FM 1265. The highway, however, officially remained part of FM 1265 until December 18, 1990, when TX-23 was officially established and FM 1265 cancelled.

== Junction list ==
County	Location	mi	km	Destinations	Notes
Texas–Oklahoma state line		0.0	0.0	SH 23 continues south into Texas	
Beaver	Elmwood	8.4	13.5	US 270 / US 412 / SH-3	Southern end of US-270 concurrency
Beaver		28.7	46.2	US 64 / US 270	Northern end of US-270 concurrency, southern end of US-64 concurrency
Beaver		29.7	47.8	US 64	Northern end of US-64 concurrency
Oklahoma–Kansas state line		36.2	58.3	K-23 continues north into Kansas	
1.000 mi = 1.609 km; 1.000 km = 0.621 mi: Concurrency terminus
