= Harold Ensley =

American TV personality, outdoorsman (1912–2005)

Harold Edward Ensley
- Publicity Photo of Harold Ensley
- Born: November 20, 1912; Healy, Kansas, US
- Died: August 24, 2005 (aged 92)
- Resting place: Longview Memorial Gardens, Kansas City, Missouri
- Occupations: Radio and television personality, outdoor sports television pioneer, professional fisherman and outdoorsman, noted fishing lure designer
- Known for: Host of the fishing and outdoor sports television show The Sportsman's Friend
- Spouse: Bonnie Ruth Ensley
- Children: 4

Harold Edward Ensley (November 20, 1912 – August 24, 2005) was an American radio and television personality best known for his television program The Sportsman's Friend. His innovative, nationally syndicated program was one of the first to feature fishing and hunting, and ran nonstop for 48 years. Harold Ensley earned the title: "World Champion of Freshwater Sport Fishing" by winning "The World Series of Freshwater Sport Fishing", the first major fishing tournament by Sports Illustrated, in 1960. He has been inducted into the National Fresh Water Fishing Hall of Fame, the Kansas Association of Broadcaster's Hall Of Fame, Legends of the Outdoors Hall of Fame, the Kansas Sports Hall of Fame, and the Missouri Sports Hall of Fame in 1994. He has won numerous awards for hunting, fishing, and broadcasting. As a noted lure designer, he contributed to the development of modern sport fishing lures. He also marketed his own line of fishing rods, reels and various fishing accessories, and wrote two books, Winds of Chance and Wings of Chance, which recount some of his life's adventures outdoors.

== Early life and radio show ==
Harold Ensley grew up on a cattle ranch near the town of Healy, Kansas. He was an avid history student, and at the age of eighteen graduated valedictorian of his one-room schoolhouse—despite his habit of skipping class to go fishing. After completing school, he moved to Joplin, Missouri, where he was a Church of Christ minister, and had his own Christian radio show. Once while attempting to sell advertisement slots during his radio program, a friend commented that he would buy an ad if Harold had a fishing show. Ensley started that show by donating his time for free. He chose the Smiley Burnette song, "It's My Lazy Day," which contains the line, "Well, I might have gone fishin'..." for the show's theme song. Many years later, Smiley sang the song live on Harold's TV show. Ensley moved to the Kansas City metropolitan area in 1949. There he wrote a syndicated newspaper column, while working for another radio station selling advertising. He convinced the radio station to air The Fisherman's Friend, in 1951 by working for free. The radio show began with a new theme song, "Gone Fishin'" written by Nick and Charles Kenny and sung by The Three Suns with Texas Jim Robertson (You can hear the song on YouTube). This became Ensley's theme song throughout his career.

== The Sportsman's Friend ==
In 1953, Ensley decided to try something relatively new: a prime-time television show on fishing. The weekly half-hour program, called The Sportsman's Friend, aired on KCMO-TV in Kansas City, and included segments on fishing, hunting and other outdoor adventures. With sponsorship from the Ford Motor Company, the show was an immediate success.

"When we first tried this live show, I wondered if anyone would even tune in," Mr. Ensley said. "But after that first show, the switchboard at the station was filled up. There must be more fishermen out there than I thought."

Ensley said it was the second televised outdoors show at that time. Initially in black-and-white, it would be among the first television shows in the Midwest to air in color. When Ensley started his show, fishing was prime-time material. He did live shows weekly for 21 years, opposite such popular series as Peter Gunn and Ben Casey. Yet, The Sportsman's Friend jumped to the top of the ratings and fared very well throughout the years. He chose to continue using his radio show theme song, "Gone Fishin'" for his television program. At the end of each show, Harold Ensley would give his closing thoughts leading into "his fishing fever getting up", and then transitioning into his slightly varying tagline: "....and you know when Ensley's fishin' fever is high, if anybody asks where Ensley is, you tell 'em that the last you saw him, he had gone fishin'." He would then hang his "Gone Fishin'" sign over the mantle of his "hunting lodge set" fireplace and exit as his theme song started to play. His tagline/song combination was so effective that The Sportsman's Friend also became known as "Gone Fishin' " by many viewers.

"I think the fact that we did it live really made the show what it was," Ensley said in 1997. "We'd show film of me fishing someplace, then we'd have live guests. People from everywhere would call us to see if they could be on to show the fish they had caught. One time a guy from Hiawatha, Kansas came in with a 72-pound flathead catfish. We had it in a horse tank in the back of a pickup, and he drove it right onto the set. When he pulled that big catfish out of the tank, water went flying everywhere."

Every week for 21 years, 1,104 live telecasts, with no reruns, Harold and his son Dusty filmed their adventures. They shot over two million feet of film. Episodes covered topics from snow and water skiing, waterfowl and upland game bird hunting, hang gliding to horseback riding in the high country. And of course, the predominant element of the program remained fishing. Extras on his show included his two dogs, Ben, an English Setter, and a pointer named after his red Country Squire, Ford station wagon.

As the show grew more popular, Ensley branched out and began spanning the globe. He traveled internationally to televise shows on four continents and from four oceans. By 1973 his show went into national syndication and was shown in seventy markets across the nation for the next 27 years. All together, The Sportsman's Friend was on air 48 straight years. It became the longest-running show of its kind.

== Fishing lure design and Harold Ensley merchandise ==
Ensley is also known for designing fishing lures. In the 1950s he invented the "Reaper" lure, which played a seminal role in the growth of jig and soft-plastic fishing baits. It was manufactured by Ted Green of Mar-Lynn Lure Company in Blue Springs, Missouri. Ensley designed it for catching lake trout in Canada, but as Green made them in various sizes, it became a popular multispecies lure. The Reaper was a precursor to modern soft-plastic lure forms commonly used world-wide today. Harold Ensley's "Tiny Tots" jigs helped introduce and popularize ultralight spinning tackle for crappie and panfish.

Throughout his career he endorsed and marketed his own line of fishing rods, reels and various fishing merchandise manufactured though different companies. These items included lures such as the soft plastic "puddle jumper" designed by Chuck Woods and Ted Green, fillet knives, tackle, and even fish fry coating mix, which bear his signature and often his image.

== Television appearances and celebrity status ==
As Harold Ensley's success grew he became a national celebrity. He was asked to make guest appearances on prime-time TV series. He guided Jed Clampett on a fishing trip during an episode of The Beverly Hillbillies. The cast of Gunsmoke appeared on his show, and in 1965 he returned the favor, appearing as a waiter in the episode “Deputy Festus” (S10E17). Harold Ensley instructed Jimmy Stewart how to cast a fishing rod at a motel swimming pool. He taught Henry Fonda how to catch trout in Wyoming during the 1962 filming of Spencer's Mountain. He fished with Tennessee Ernie Ford, Karl Malden, Rex Allen, William Holden, Denver Pyle, Mel Tillis, Kirk Douglas, Clint Walker, Clint Eastwood, Barbara Rhoades, Robert Fuller and many other notables. He hunted quail with Roy Rogers and the Apollo 17 astronauts and fished with various governors, senators, and a president's son. He loved major league baseball, and fished with Ted Williams, Joe DiMaggio, Enos Slaughter, Stan Musial, Bobby Richardson, Tony Kubek, Roger Maris, and George Brett. Mickey Mantle autographed a photo to him which read, "To Harold, the second best fisherman I know. (signed) Number One; Mickey Mantle."

== Final years and death ==
Harold's wife, Bonnie R. Ensley died January 12, 1992, at age 70. Harold Ensley himself had suffered many years with heart problems but refused to let them slow him down. At age 80, when he had a heart attack, he didn't even consider retiring. Just a month after being hospitalized, he was back fishing in front of the cameras.

"I had a tarpon-fishing trip to Costa Rica planned, and I didn't want to miss it," Ensley told the Kansas City Star in 1997. At 88, Ensley was forced to quit the show after a boating accident in Costa Rica, when he severely injured his spine. After the show ended, he wrote two books on his life experiences and was a popular speaker at banquets and sports shows. Ensley also loved gardening at home and continued fishing when his health allowed. He never stopped promoting sport fishing. In the last year of his life, he was teaching his caregiver to catch and clean crappie. She escorted Ensley, who was in a wheelchair, on a fishing trip days before the start of his last hospital stay.

Reflecting on his earlier lifetime in a 2003 interview with the Wichita Eagle, Ensley said: "Back then, fishing and hunting were largely seen as a waste of time when you could be working." "Who'd have ever thought I'd find a way to get paid for hunting and fishing for all those years?"

During their last conversation, Ensley claimed, to his son, to have been dreaming about fishing. "He said he'd been dreaming about bass fishing at Table Rock Lake using a buzzbait," Dusty Ensley said. "He went out thinking about hunting and fishing." Harold Ensley died at his home in Overland Park, Kansas, at the age of 92.
