= Healy, Kansas =

Unincorporated community in Lane County, Kansas

- Unincorporated community and CDP
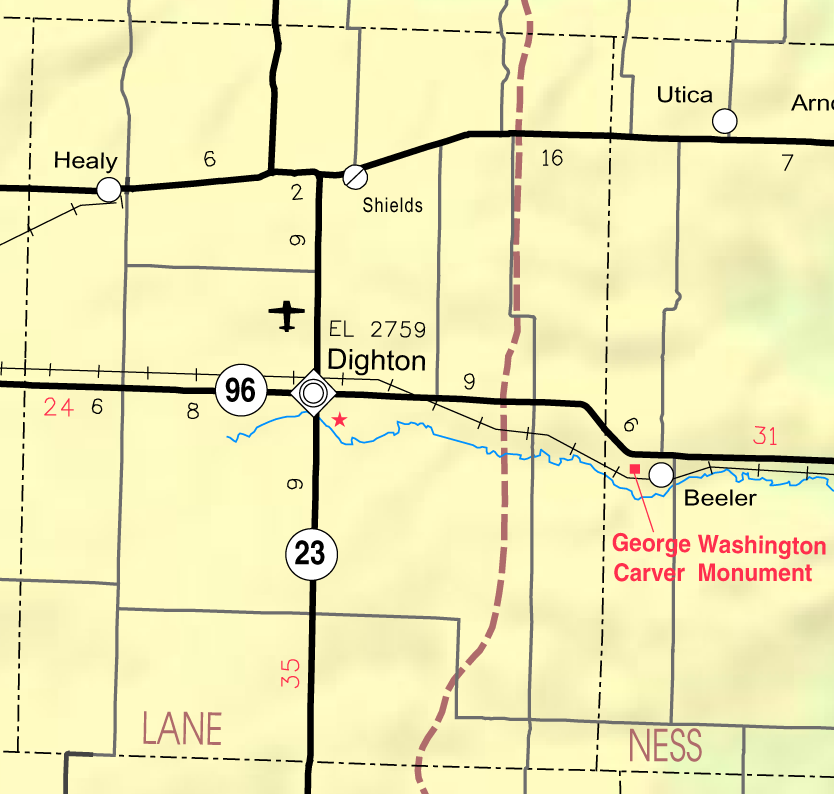
- KDOT map of Lane County (legend)

- Location within Kansas Location within the United States
- Coordinates: 38°36′10″N 100°37′03″W
- Country: United States
- State: Kansas
- County: Lane
- Founded: 1880s

Area
  - Total: 3.46 sq mi (8.96 km^{2})
  - Land: 3.46 sq mi (8.96 km^{2})
  - Water: 0 sq mi (0.0 km^{2})
- Elevation: 2,858 ft (871 m)

Population (2020)
  - Total: 195
  - Density: 56.4/sq mi (21.8/km^{2})
- Time zone: UTC-6 (CST)
  - Summer (DST): UTC-5 (CDT)
- ZIP Code: 67850
- Area code: 620
- FIPS code: 20-31200
- GNIS ID: 2629160

Healy is an unincorporated community and census-designated place (CDP) in Lane County, Kansas, United States. As of the 2020 census, the population was 195.

== History ==
Healy originated as a station and shipping point on the Missouri Pacific Railroad. The first post office in Healy was established in 1887.

== Geography ==
Healy is located in Cheyenne Township on K-4, 16 miles (26 km) east of the highway's western end at U.S. Route 83 and 9 miles (14 km) west of Shields. Via K-4 and K-23, Healy is 17 miles (27 km) northwest of Dighton, the Lane county seat.

According to the U.S. Census Bureau, the Healy census-designated place (CDP) has an area of 3.5 square miles (9.0 km^{2}), all land.

=== Climate ===
According to the Köppen Climate Classification system, Healy has a semi-arid climate, abbreviated "BSk" on climate maps.

Climate data for Healy, Kansas (1991–2020)
Month	Jan	Feb	Mar	Apr	May	Jun	Jul	Aug	Sep	Oct	Nov	Dec	Year
Mean daily maximum °F (°C)	44.5 (6.9)	48.1 (8.9)	58.4 (14.7)	67.2 (19.6)	76.7 (24.8)	87.9 (31.1)	93.0 (33.9)	90.5 (32.5)	83.3 (28.5)	70.4 (21.3)	56.4 (13.6)	45.8 (7.7)	68.5 (20.3)
Daily mean °F (°C)	30.5 (−0.8)	33.7 (0.9)	43.2 (6.2)	51.9 (11.1)	62.6 (17.0)	73.6 (23.1)	78.7 (25.9)	76.4 (24.7)	68.2 (20.1)	54.8 (12.7)	41.7 (5.4)	32.1 (0.1)	54.0 (12.2)
Mean daily minimum °F (°C)	16.5 (−8.6)	19.3 (−7.1)	27.9 (−2.3)	36.6 (2.6)	48.5 (9.2)	59.3 (15.2)	64.3 (17.9)	62.3 (16.8)	53.1 (11.7)	39.2 (4.0)	27.0 (−2.8)	18.4 (−7.6)	39.4 (4.1)
Average precipitation inches (mm)	0.44 (11)	0.67 (17)	1.29 (33)	2.07 (53)	3.25 (83)	3.03 (77)	3.20 (81)	3.21 (82)	2.04 (52)	1.66 (42)	0.76 (19)	0.76 (19)	22.38 (569)
Average snowfall inches (cm)	3.8 (9.7)	5.5 (14)	3.9 (9.9)	1.3 (3.3)	0.5 (1.3)	0.0 (0.0)	0.0 (0.0)	0.0 (0.0)	0.0 (0.0)	1.1 (2.8)	2.3 (5.8)	4.0 (10)	22.4 (56.8)
Source: NOAA

== Demographics ==
Historical population
Census	Pop.	Note	%±
2010	234		—
2020	195		−16.7%
U.S. Decennial Census

=== 2020 census ===
The 2020 United States census counted 195 people, 93 households, and 67 families in Healy. The population density was 56.4 per square mile (21.8/km^{2}). There were 102 housing units at an average density of 29.5 per square mile (11.4/km^{2}). The racial makeup was 81.03% (158) white or European American (80.0% non-Hispanic white), 0.0% (0) black or African-American, 2.05% (4) Native American or Alaska Native, 0.0% (0) Asian, 0.0% (0) Pacific Islander or Native Hawaiian, 4.1% (8) from other races, and 12.82% (25) from two or more races. Hispanic or Latino of any race was 13.33% (26) of the population.

Of the 93 households, 38.7% had children under the age of 18; 51.6% were married couples living together; 20.4% had a female householder with no spouse or partner present. 24.7% of households consisted of individuals and 8.6% had someone living alone who was 65 years of age or older. The average household size was 2.3 and the average family size was 2.8. The percent of those with a bachelor's degree or higher was estimated to be 17.9% of the population.

26.2% of the population was under the age of 18, 8.2% from 18 to 24, 24.6% from 25 to 44, 21.5% from 45 to 64, and 19.5% who were 65 years of age or older. The median age was 39.1 years. For every 100 females, there were 89.3 males. For every 100 females ages 18 and older, there were 92.0 males.

The 2016–2020 5-year American Community Survey estimates show that the median household income was $56,875 (with a margin of error of +/- $28,320) and the median family income was $65,714 (+/- $40,979). Males had a median income of $38,750 (+/- $14,518) versus $26,071 (+/- $14,106) for females. The median income for those above 16 years old was $35,250 (+/- $7,532). Approximately, 1.1% of families and 3.1% of the population were below the poverty line, including 0.0% of those under the age of 18 and 0.0% of those ages 65 or over.

== Economy ==
Sharp Brothers Seed Company is a family-owned seed company that has been in business in Healy since 1958. It currently has about 60 employees in Healy.

== Education ==
The community is served by "Healy USD 468" public school district. Their mascot is "The Eagles", and offer volleyball, basketball and track, collaborating with Ransom, KS.

As of the 2023–2024 school year, Healy is the smallest public school in the state of Kansas, and one of the smallest in the entire country, with an enrollment of 20 K-12 students, and only five high school students.

On November 5, 2024, a public vote decided to the disorganization of "Healy USD 468" and merge into "Scott County USD 466" starting in fall 2025, 96 in favor, 43 against.

== Notable people ==
- Harold Ensley, radio and television personality best known for his television program The Sportsman's Friend
