= Matt Williams (left-handed pitcher) =

American baseball player (born 1971)

- Pitcher
- Born: April 12, 1971 (age 55); Virginia Beach, Virginia
- Batted: Switch Threw: Left

MLB debut
- April 5, 2000, for the Milwaukee Brewers

Last MLB appearance
- April 29, 2000, for the Milwaukee Brewers

MLB statistics
- Win–loss record: 0–0
- Earned run average: 7.00
- Strikeouts: 7
- Stats at Baseball Reference

Teams
- Milwaukee Brewers (2000)

Matthew Taylor Williams (born April 12, 1971) is a former Major League Baseball pitcher. Williams pitched in 2000 for the Milwaukee Brewers, throwing 9 innings over 11 games.

== Education ==
A native of Virginia Beach, Virginia, Williams attended Floyd E. Kellam High School and Virginia Commonwealth University. In 1991, he played collegiate summer baseball with the Chatham A's of the Cape Cod Baseball League.

== Career ==
Williams was originally drafted in the 4th round of the 1992 Major League Baseball draft by the Cleveland Indians. In May of 1995, he was traded to the Houston Astros for catcher Eddie Tucker, and from there he made his way through the farm systems of the Pittsburgh Pirates, Tampa Bay Devil Rays, and New York Yankees, as well as playing for the independent High Desert Mavericks and Bakersfield Blaze. He was chosen in the 1999 Rule 5 draft by the Brewers, and the next April he made his major league debut. After a month and an ERA of 7.00, however, the Brewers returned him to the Yankees, and he never played in the majors again.

== Sources ==
- Career statistics from Baseball Reference · Baseball Reference (Minors) · Retrosheet · Baseball Almanac
