= Beaver, Oklahoma =

Town in Oklahoma, US

- Town
- Nickname: "Cowchip Throwing Capital of The World"
- Motto: "No Man's Land – Every Man's Town"
- Location within Beaver County and Oklahoma
- Coordinates: 36°48′54″N 100°31′25″W
- Country: United States
- State: Oklahoma
- County: Beaver

Government
  - Mayor: Kirk Fisher
  - Administrator: Marc Davis

Area
  - Total: 1.15 sq mi (2.97 km^{2})
  - Land: 1.15 sq mi (2.97 km^{2})
  - Water: 0 sq mi (0.00 km^{2})
- Elevation: 2,428 ft (740 m)

Population (2020)
  - Total: 1,280
  - Density: 1,114.6/sq mi (430.34/km^{2})
- Time zone: UTC-6 (Central (CST))
  - Summer (DST): UTC-5 (CDT)
- ZIP code: 73932
- Area code: 580
- FIPS code: 40-04750
- GNIS ID: 2411674
- Website: Town website

Beaver is a town in and the county seat of Beaver County, Oklahoma, United States, in the Oklahoma Panhandle. As of the 2020 census, its population was 1,280. Beaver hosts the annual World Cow Chip Throwing Championship.

Originally known as Beaver City, the town began as the site of a fur trading post in 1879 and was planned to be the capital of the proposed Cimarron Territory. The Federal government never recognized the proposed territory, but Beaver remained a center of business and law enforcement in the area. In 1890 it became the seat of Seventh County, encompassing the entire Oklahoma Panhandle, and later the county seat of Beaver County.

== History ==
Beaver is located by Beaver River, also known as North Canadian River, and began as the location of a fur-trading post in 1879. Its original name was Beaver City, and was planned to be the capital of the short-lived Cimarron Territory. The Federal government never recognized the proposed Territory, but Beaver City remained the center of business and law enforcement for the area. In 1890, the territory was assigned to Oklahoma Territory; Beaver City became the seat for the entire Oklahoma Panhandle, then known as Seventh County.

Beaver began as a stop on the Jones and Plummer Trail. In 1880, Jim Lane built a house on the south side of Beaver Creek, that also served as a general store, saloon, hotel, and restaurant. (Note: The Lane House a/k/a the Lane Cabin still stands, and is on the National Register of Historic Places.) Beaver slowly sprouted along the banks of Beaver Creek. The first post office had been established on the north side of the river in 1883. In 1884, Lane moved the post office to his store and became the postmaster. He also added a corral and livery stable to accommodate freighters and cattle drivers. The Presbyterian Church was built in 1887. It is listed on the National Register of Historic Places as ""the oldest church in Oklahoma Territory". The Groves Hotel (later renamed the Thompson Hotel) was said to be the first business in town, when it was built in 1885. In 1891, Carter Tracy opened a general hardware and implement store. The first newspaper, the Territorial Advocate, began printing in 1887. (Note: Although the paper's name was later changed to the Herald Democrat, It has continued doing business for over 100 years, into the 21st century.)

Although the Oklahoma Panhandle is noted for its lack of rainfall, it is occasionally subjected to flash floods. One such event occurred early in Beaver's history, and flooded Main Street, where many of the businesses had been built. Another street, Douglas, had already been built, running south up a hill from the river, where the businesses relocated to prevent a recurrence.

The population grew to 112 in 1900. Further, the main reason for its existence was to support cattle ranches located in the Panhandle area. In 1901–02, the Homestead Act encouraged farmers to move in to the area. (Note: The ranchers derisively called the farmers "pumpkin rollers.") Growth continued after the turn of 1900. A telephone exchange was built in 1905, and the Bank of Beaver City and the First National Bank, were established. The Beaver, Meade and Englewood Railroad (BME) was built to connect to the Missouri, Kansas and Texas Railway, a.k.a. M-K-T or "Katy", in Forgan, Oklahoma, 7 miles (11 km) to the north. The BME track to Forgan was not completed until 1915. Later, the BME was extended into Texas and Cimarron Counties. Soon after, the M-K-T bought the BME system for $2 million.

During the Dust Bowl and the Great Depression most of the Panhandle and its communities suffered great economic hardships and lost population. The city of Beaver actually gained population. In 1920, it had 920 residents, which grew to 1028 in 1930 and 1146 in 1940.

Between Beaver and Guymon along Beaver Creek there are several plains Indians ruins. They are on private property and not accessible to the public. These ruins are associated with the Buried City Plains Indian Ruins near Perryton, Texas.

== Geography ==
According to the United States Census Bureau, the city had a total area of 1.1 square miles (2.8 km^{2}), all land.

A mile north of the town is Beaver Dunes Park, now owned by the City of Beaver, featuring sand dunes left by ancient seas that once covered the area.

=== Climate ===
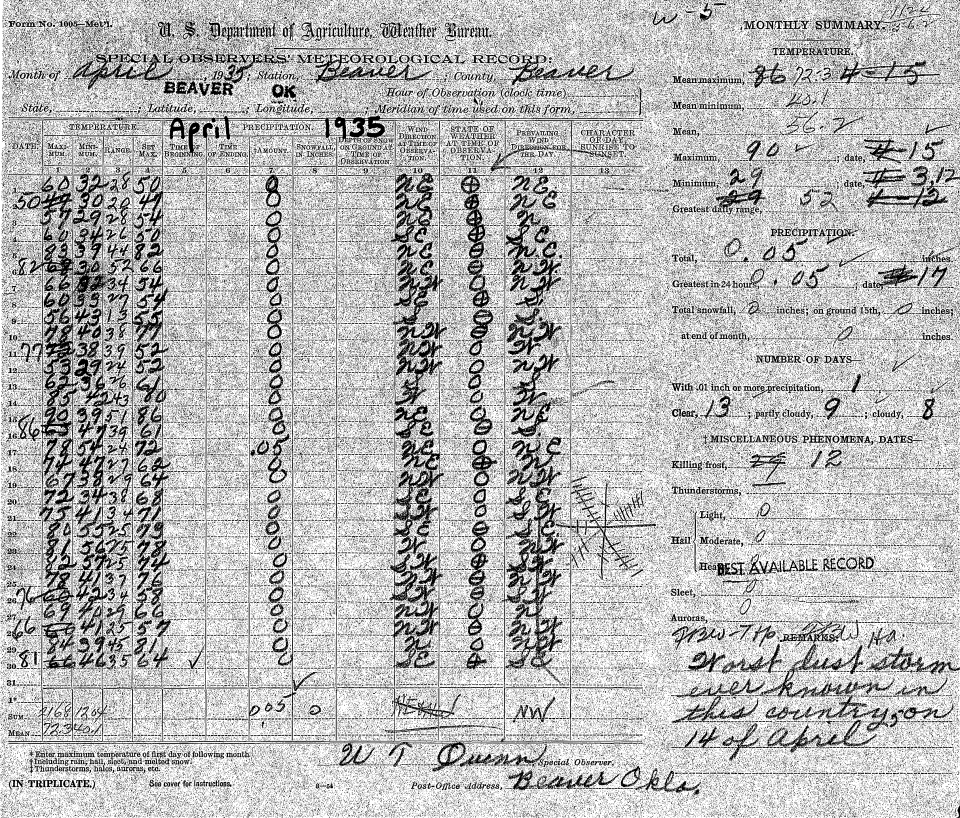
US meteorological record, Beaver, OK, April 1935. This is significant as report of dust storms.

Beaver experiences a cool semi-arid climate (Köppen BSk), bordering upon a humid subtropical climate (Cfa). It features cold, highly variable, and dry winters alongside hot, much wetter summers.

While not the snowiest location in Oklahoma ranked by annual average snowfall, Beaver has the distinction of holding the State snowfall record for a season, 87.3 inches or 2.2 meters during 1911–1912.

Climate data for Beaver, OK
Month	Jan	Feb	Mar	Apr	May	Jun	Jul	Aug	Sep	Oct	Nov	Dec	Year
Record high °F (°C)	82 (28)	89 (32)	94 (34)	102 (39)	108 (42)	113 (45)	110 (43)	110 (43)	108 (42)	99 (37)	89 (32)	87 (31)	113 (45)
Mean daily maximum °F (°C)	46.0 (7.8)	52.3 (11.3)	60.7 (15.9)	70.8 (21.6)	78.9 (26.1)	89.1 (31.7)	95.1 (35.1)	93.2 (34.0)	84.8 (29.3)	73.8 (23.2)	58.7 (14.8)	48.3 (9.1)	71.0 (21.7)
Daily mean °F (°C)	31.8 (−0.1)	37.2 (2.9)	45.5 (7.5)	55.3 (12.9)	64.8 (18.2)	75.0 (23.9)	80.7 (27.1)	79.0 (26.1)	70.1 (21.2)	57.8 (14.3)	43.6 (6.4)	34.0 (1.1)	56.2 (13.5)
Mean daily minimum °F (°C)	17.5 (−8.1)	22.0 (−5.6)	30.3 (−0.9)	39.7 (4.3)	50.7 (10.4)	60.8 (16.0)	66.2 (19.0)	64.7 (18.2)	55.4 (13.0)	41.8 (5.4)	28.4 (−2.0)	19.7 (−6.8)	41.4 (5.2)
Record low °F (°C)	−23 (−31)	−19 (−28)	−10 (−23)	15 (−9)	26 (−3)	41 (5)	46 (8)	45 (7)	27 (−3)	13 (−11)	−6 (−21)	−13 (−25)	−23 (−31)
Average precipitation inches (mm)	0.53 (13)	0.73 (19)	1.75 (44)	1.82 (46)	3.04 (77)	3.24 (82)	2.75 (70)	2.39 (61)	1.78 (45)	1.32 (34)	1.11 (28)	0.78 (20)	21.24 (539)
Source 1: NOAA (normals, 1971–2000)
Source 2: The Weather Channel (Records)

== Demographics ==
Historical population
Census	Pop.	Note	%±
1900	112		—
1910	326		191.1%
1920	920		182.2%
1930	1,028		11.7%
1940	1,166		13.4%
1950	1,495		28.2%
1960	2,087		39.6%
1970	1,853		−11.2%
1980	1,939		4.6%
1990	1,584		−18.3%
2000	1,570		−0.9%
2010	1,515		−3.5%
2020	1,280		−15.5%
U.S. Decennial Census

=== 2020 census ===
As of the 2020 census, Beaver had a population of 1,280. The median age was 41.3 years. 23.7% of residents were under the age of 18 and 23.4% of residents were 65 years of age or older. For every 100 females there were 94.5 males, and for every 100 females age 18 and over there were 94.8 males age 18 and over.

0.0% of residents lived in urban areas, while 100.0% lived in rural areas.

There were 506 households in Beaver, of which 29.8% had children under the age of 18 living in them. Of all households, 49.4% were married-couple households, 21.9% were households with a male householder and no spouse or partner present, and 25.5% were households with a female householder and no spouse or partner present. About 31.0% of all households were made up of individuals and 15.2% had someone living alone who was 65 years of age or older.

There were 699 housing units, of which 27.6% were vacant. The homeowner vacancy rate was 3.3% and the rental vacancy rate was 34.3%.

Racial composition as of the 2020 census
Race	Number	Percent
White	944	73.8%
Black or African American	4	0.3%
American Indian and Alaska Native	16	1.2%
Asian	5	0.4%
Native Hawaiian and Other Pacific Islander	3	0.2%
Some other race	191	14.9%
Two or more races	117	9.1%
Hispanic or Latino (of any race)	362	28.3%

=== 2010 census ===
As of the census of 2010, there were 1,515 people living in the city. The population density was 1,300 inhabitants per square mile (500/km^{2}). The racial makeup of the city was 92.48% White, 0.57% African American, 1.53% Native American, 0.06% Asian, 0.13% Pacific Islander, 3.69% from other races, and 1.53% from two or more races. Hispanic or Latino people of any race were 9.68% of the population.

There were 606 households, out of which 32.2% had children under the age of 18 living with them, 61.1% were married couples living together, 8.3% had a female householder with no husband present, and 28.1% were non-families. 26.2% of all households were made up of individuals, and 16.3% had someone living alone who was 65 years of age or older. The average household size was 2.43 and the average family size was 2.91.

In the city the population was spread out, with 25.4% under the age of 18, 6.1% from 18 to 24, 26.3% from 25 to 44, 20.8% from 45 to 64, and 21.5% who were 65 years of age or older. The median age was 39 years. For every 100 females, there were 95.0 males. For every 100 females age 18 and over, there were 92.8 males.

The median income for a household in the city was $37,560, and the median income for a family was $44,107. Males had a median income of $34,167 versus $19,511 for females. The per capita income for the city was $19,897. About 6.8% of families and 10.2% of the population were below the poverty line, including 12.9% of those under age 18 and 7.6% of those age 65 or over.

== Economy ==
At the start of the 21st century, Beaver's economy was primarily based on cattle ranching, hog farms, wheat and milo farming and oil and gas production. Supporting these industries were such businesses as two banks, oil field suppliers, a hospital, a nursing home and two medical clinics.

== Education ==
Beaver Independent School District is the school district.

== Transportation ==
=== Highways ===
U.S. Route 270 runs concurrently with State 23 north/south through the town.

=== Airport ===
The Beaver Municipal Airport is located at the southern end of town, at coordinates 036° 47' 52.44"N 100° 31' 36.84"W. The FAA Identifier is K44, and it has two runways used primarily for general aviation. Runway 17/35 is 4050' x 60' with an asphalt surface, while 04/22 is a grass/turf field that is 2000' x 130'. Commercial air service is available at Liberal Mid-America Regional Airport in Liberal, Kansas, about 38 miles west-northwest.

== Historical sites ==
The Jones & Plummer Trail Museum offers a glimpse into the early days in and around the town through displays of historical artifacts and prototype rooms.

NRHP-listed sites include the Beaver County Courthouse, the Presbyterian Church, and the Lane Cabin at Main Street and Avenue C.

== Notable people ==
- Nick Bobeck (1980–), football player and coach
- George Dobson (1851–1919), lawyer and politician
- Timothy Leonard (1940–2026), United States federal judge for the Western District of Oklahoma (since 1992; senior status since 2006)
- Robert Loofbourrow (1873–1926), pioneer settler, attorney and Associate Justice of the Oklahoma Supreme Court (1913–1915)
- Ross Rizley (1892–1969), politician and U.S. Representative from Oklahoma

== See also ==
- Otasco
- Jones Plummer Trail
- Black Sunday, one of the worst dust storms during Dust Bowl
- Presbyterian Church (Beaver, Oklahoma)
- National Register of Historic Places listings in Beaver County, Oklahoma
