= Grainfield Township, Kansas =

Grainfield Township
- Township
- Location in Gove County
- Coordinates: 39°04′10″N 100°29′01″W
- Country: United States
- State: Kansas
- County: Gove

Area
  - Total: 71.16 sq mi (184.31 km^{2})
  - Land: 71.2 sq mi (184.3 km^{2})
  - Water: 0.0039 sq mi (0.01 km^{2}) 0.01%
- Elevation: 2,799 ft (853 m)

Population (2020)
  - Total: 406
  - Density: 6.0/sq mi (2.3/km^{2})
- GNIS feature ID: 0471315

Grainfield Township is a township in Gove County, Kansas, United States. As of the 2020 census, its population was 406.

== Geography ==
Grainfield Township covers an area of 71.16 square miles (184.3 km^{2}) and contains one incorporated settlement, Grainfield. According to the USGS, it contains one cemetery, Grainfield.
