= Beaver County Courthouse (Oklahoma) =

- U.S. National Register of Historic Places
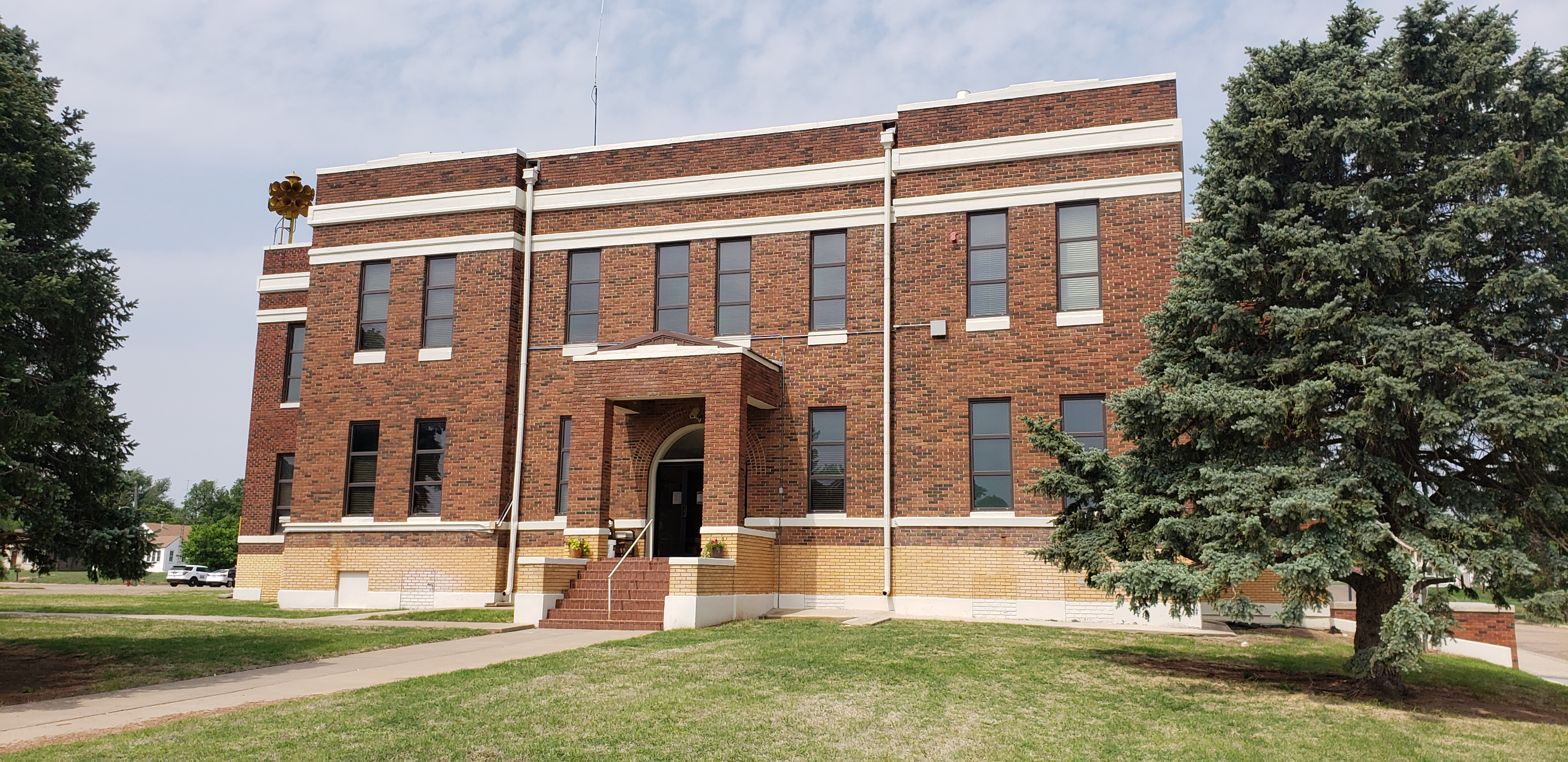

- Location within Oklahoma Location within the United States
- Location: Off US 270, Beaver City, Oklahoma
- Coordinates: 36°48′57″N 100°31′16″W
- Area: less than one acre
- Built: 1926
- Built by: Butler Co.; Strong, S.S.
- MPS: County Courthouses of Oklahoma TR
- NRHP reference No.: 84002964
- Added to NRHP: August 23, 1984

The Beaver County Courthouse in Beaver in Beaver County, Oklahoma was built in 1926. Located off U.S. Route 270, it is a red brick 75 by 75 feet (23 m × 23 m) two-story courthouse built around old 1907 stone courthouse.

It was listed on the National Register of Historic Places in 1984.
