= Jones Plummer Trail =

Cattle-droving trail in Kansas, United States

The Jones Plummer Trail, also known as the Jones and Plummer Trail, began in Dodge City, Kansas and went southwest through the Oklahoma Panhandle into Texas. Ed Jones and Joe Plummer originally used the path for bringing buffalo meat and hides to Dodge City. Later, the trail saw more use as a freight route. At one point, this trail saw over 150,000 lb (68,000 kg) of freight a week. The trail also created the city of Beaver, Oklahoma, which originated in 1880 when an enterprising man named Jim Lane built a house along the trail on the south side of the Beaver River to serve as a general store, saloon, hotel, and restaurant for travelers.

The trail served its purpose for about 20 years through the 1870s and 1880s, but was abandoned with the arrival of the railroads.
