= Meade State Park =

State park in Kansas, United States

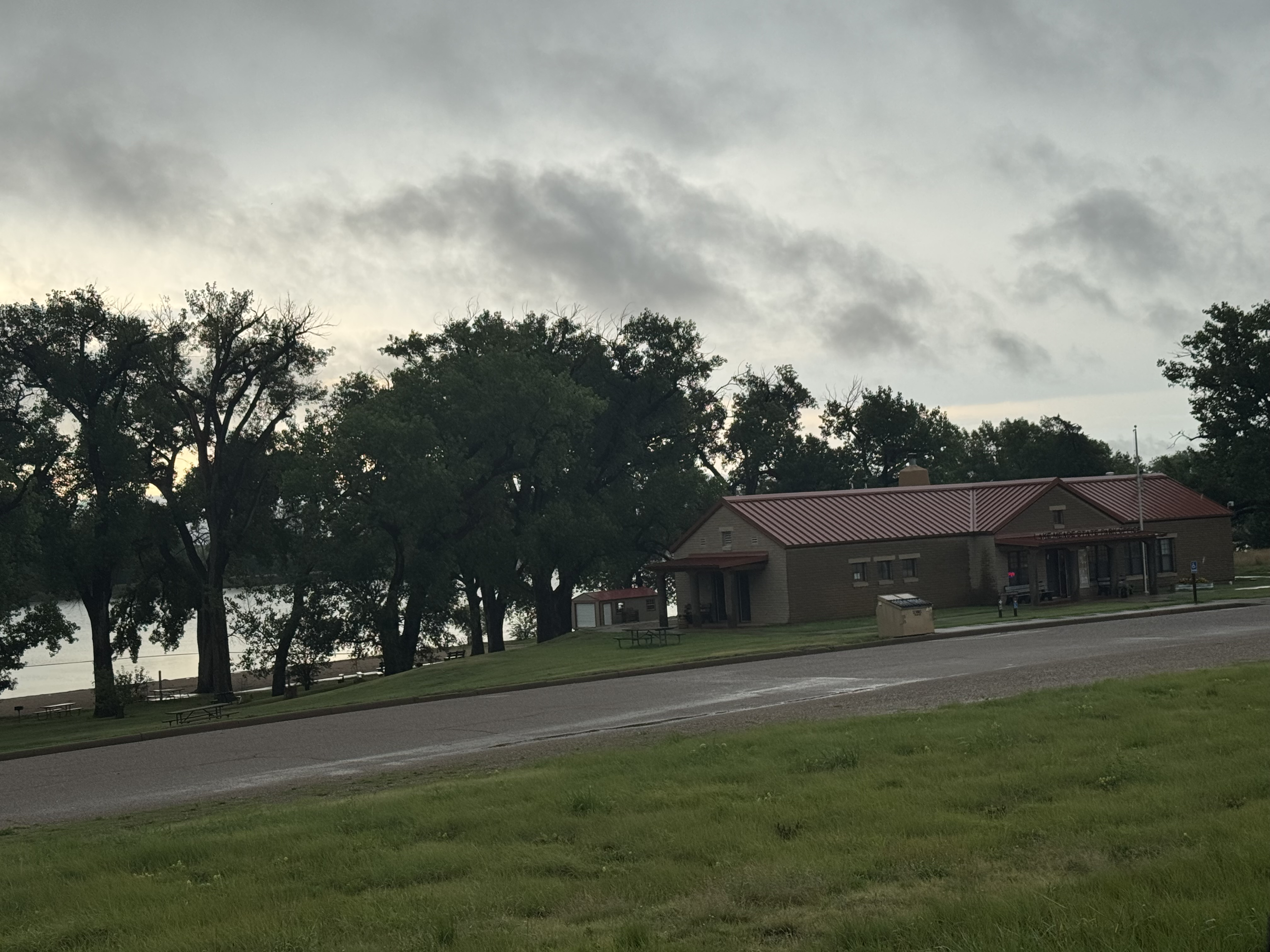
- Park office

- Location within Kansas Location within the United States
- Interactive map of Meade State Park
- Location: Meade County, Kansas, United States
- Coordinates: 37°10′20″N 100°27′02″W
- Area: 803 acres (325 ha) (park and wildlife area)
- Elevation: 2,438 ft (743 m)
- Established: 1927 (authorized 1962)
- Administrator: Kansas Department of Wildlife and Parks
- Visitors: 82,680 (in 2022)
- Website: Official website
- Kansas State Parks

Meade State Park is a state park southwest of the city of Meade in Meade County, Kansas, United States. The park features an 80-acre (32 ha) lake that contains bluegill, channel cat, and largemouth bass. Fishing is allowed in the lake year-round with motorized boating restricted to fishing only and no wake speed. In addition the park encompasses a 440-acre (180 ha) campsite and wildlife area with hiking trails.

== See also ==
- List of lakes, reservoirs, and dams in Kansas
- List of rivers of Kansas
