= Otasco =

American retail chain

- Final logo, used from 1987 to 1989
- Type: Employee-owned Corporation
- Industry: Automotive Parts
- Founded: 1918; 108 years ago
- Founder: Herman Sanditen; Maurice Sanditen; Sam Sanditen
- Defunct: June 3, 1989; 37 years ago
- Fate: Bankruptcy
- Headquarters: Tulsa, Oklahoma, United States
- Key people: Tim Finley (President & CEO, 1989)

Otasco (Oklahoma Tire and Supply Company) was a retail chain specializing in auto parts and appliances based in Tulsa, Oklahoma.

It was first established in 1918 by three Jewish Lithuanian immigrant brothers, Sam (1898–1939), Maurice (1891–1970), and Herman (1889–1971) Sanditen, who opened the first Otasco store in Okmulgee. The company moved its headquarters to Tulsa in 1925. The company based its business on offering its products on credit.

In 1960, the McCrory Corporation bought the company, while retaining the Sanditen brothers. In 1968, the chain had 455 units in 12 states. In 1984, the firm's employees bought the company from McCrory, creating one of the largest employee-owned companies in America. As Otasco's sales struggled in the 1980s, advertising firm The Richards Group was hired to create a new logo and advertising campaign, which garnered little attention. In 1988, the retail chain filed for Chapter 11 bankruptcy which resulted in the closing of 171 stores across 11 states and the loss of 1,600 jobs. On March 30, 1989, Otasco president and CEO Tim Finley arranged the reopening of 43 stores as most of the others were presently liquidating, as an attempt to funnel money from the closing locations into the now-reopened profitable locations to keep them afloat. After this attempt to revitalize the chain failed, all Otasco outlets were ordered to close permanently at the end of the business day on June 3, 1989.

According to a source, franchisees were given a 99-year license to use the Otasco name after the chain went out of business. As of 2014, two Otasco stores remain in operation in Oklahoma, in Beaver and in Marlow. Borger, Texas still had a store operating under the Otasco name in 2012. Many, Louisiana has a locally owned Otasco Associate store still in business as of 2014.
