= Grainfield, Kansas =

City in Gove County, Kansas, United States

- City
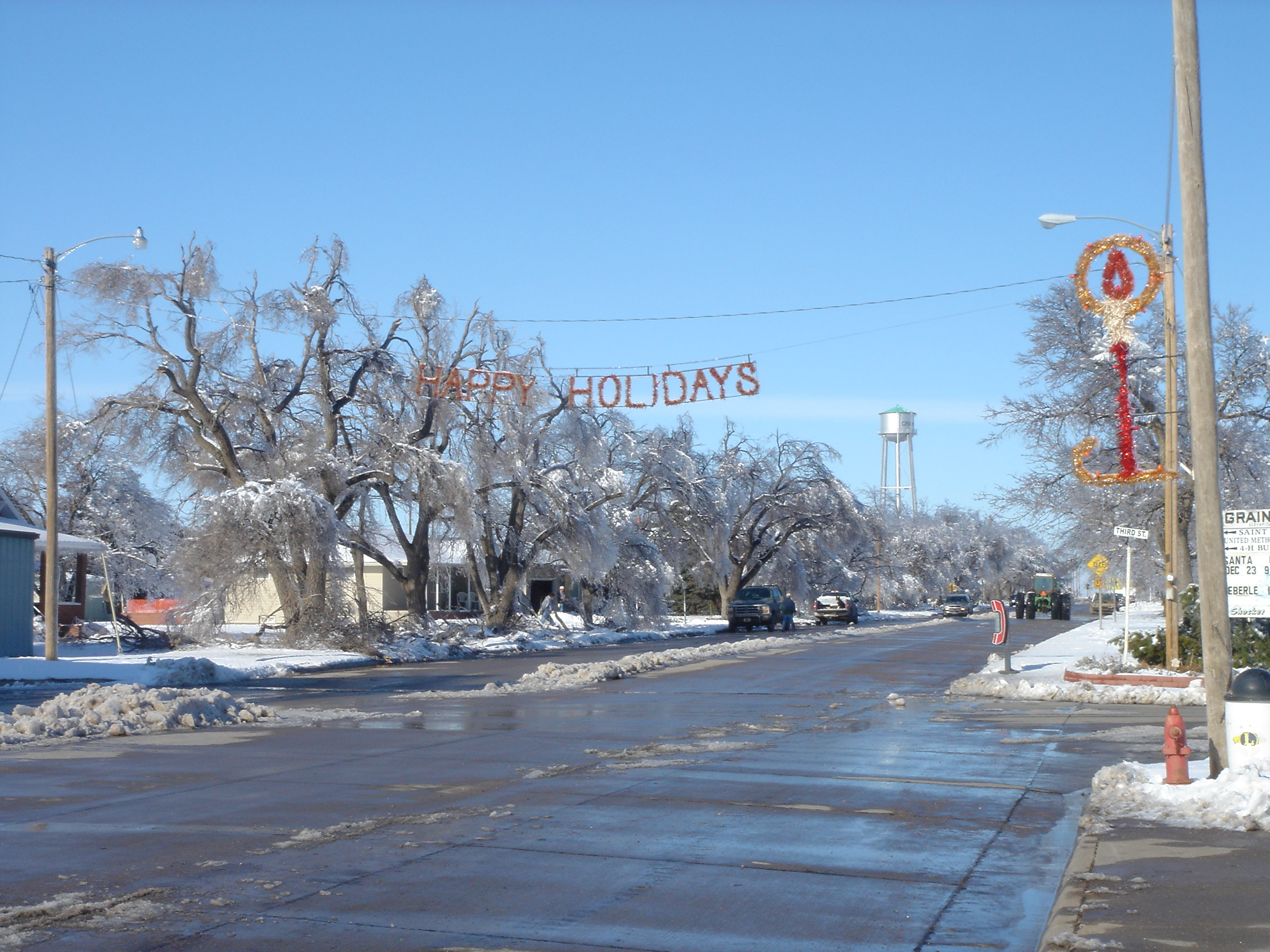
- Grainfield during Christmas season (2006)

- Location within Gove County and Kansas

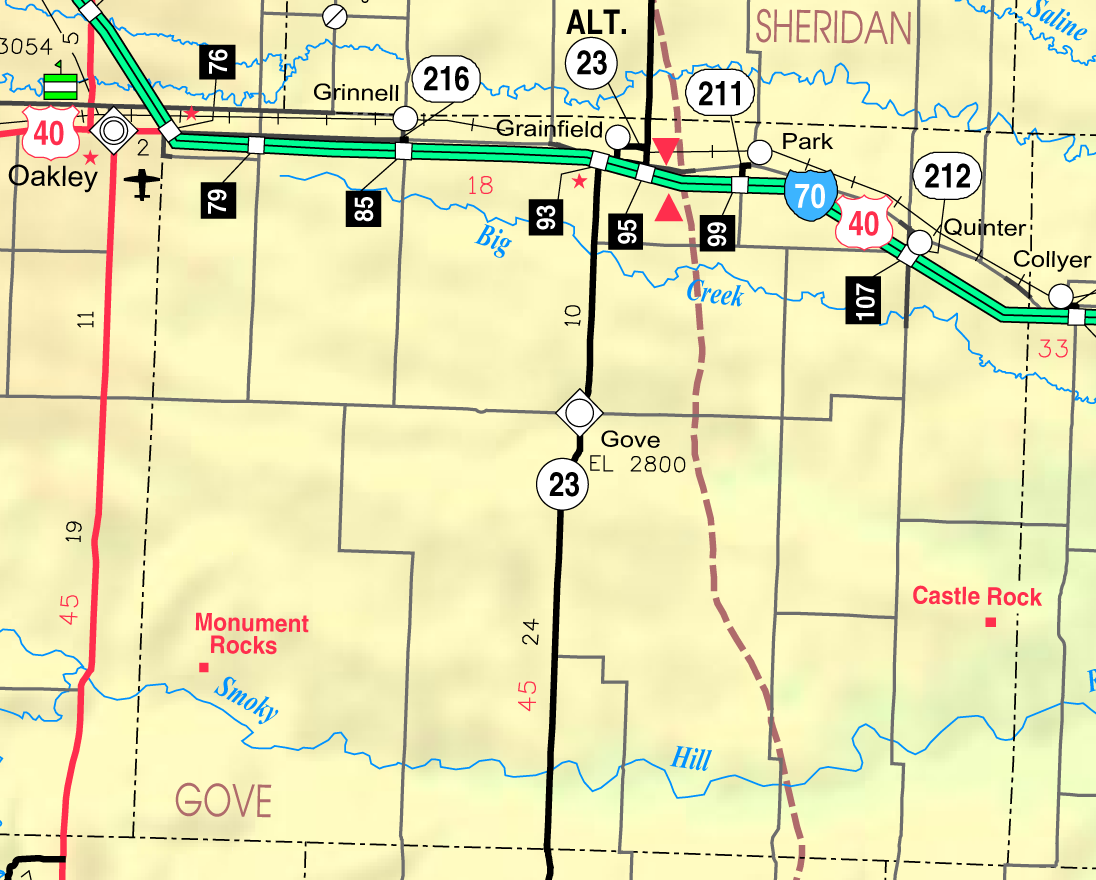
- KDOT map of Gove County (legend)
- Coordinates: 39°06′52″N 100°28′06″W
- Country: United States
- State: Kansas
- County: Gove
- Founded: 1879
- Incorporated: 1887
- Named for: Wheat fields

Area
  - Total: 0.46 sq mi (1.20 km^{2})
  - Land: 0.46 sq mi (1.20 km^{2})
  - Water: 0 sq mi (0.00 km^{2})
- Elevation: 2,812 ft (857 m)

Population (2020)
  - Total: 322
  - Density: 695/sq mi (268/km^{2})
- Time zone: UTC-6 (CST)
  - Summer (DST): UTC-5 (CDT)
- ZIP Code: 67737
- Area code: 785
- FIPS code: 20-27200
- GNIS ID: 2394946
- Website: grainfieldks.com

Grainfield is a city in northern Gove County, Kansas, United States. As of the 2020 census, the population of the city was 322.

== History ==
Grainfield got its start in the year 1879 following construction of the railroad through that territory. It was named for the wheat fields in the vicinity.

The first post office in Grainfield was established in May 1879.

The Grainfield Opera House is listed on the National Register of Historic Places.

== Geography ==
According to the United States Census Bureau, the city has a total area of 0.48 square miles (1.24 km^{2}), all land.

== Demographics ==
Historical population
Census	Pop.	Note	%±
1880	77		—
1890	99		28.6%
1900	115		16.2%
1910	309		168.7%
1920	290		−6.1%
1930	343		18.3%
1940	341		−0.6%
1950	371		8.8%
1960	389		4.9%
1970	374		−3.9%
1980	417		11.5%
1990	357		−14.4%
2000	327		−8.4%
2010	277		−15.3%
2020	322		16.2%
U.S. Decennial Census

=== 2020 census ===
The 2020 United States census counted 322 people, 132 households, and 79 families in Grainfield. The population density was 697.0 per square mile (269.1/km^{2}). There were 158 housing units at an average density of 342.0 per square mile (132.0/km^{2}). The racial makeup was 90.06% (290) white or European American (89.13% non-Hispanic white), 0.0% (0) black or African-American, 0.0% (0) Native American or Alaska Native, 0.0% (0) Asian, 0.0% (0) Pacific Islander or Native Hawaiian, 0.93% (3) from other races, and 9.01% (29) from two or more races. Hispanic or Latino of any race was 3.11% (10) of the population.

Of the 132 households, 25.8% had children under the age of 18; 52.3% were married couples living together; 22.0% had a female householder with no spouse or partner present. 36.4% of households consisted of individuals and 19.7% had someone living alone who was 65 years of age or older. The average household size was 2.0 and the average family size was 2.5. The percent of those with a bachelor's degree or higher was estimated to be 11.8% of the population.

25.5% of the population was under the age of 18, 5.0% from 18 to 24, 22.0% from 25 to 44, 27.6% from 45 to 64, and 19.9% who were 65 years of age or older. The median age was 43.5 years. For every 100 females, there were 91.7 males. For every 100 females ages 18 and older, there were 106.9 males.

The 2016–2020 5-year American Community Survey estimates show that the median household income was $43,500 (with a margin of error of +/- $12,874) and the median family income was $68,125 (+/- $15,079). Males had a median income of $27,411 (+/- $14,275) versus $23,906 (+/- $9,567) for females. The median income for those above 16 years old was $26,786 (+/- $8,324). Approximately, 5.5% of families and 6.5% of the population were below the poverty line, including 0.0% of those under the age of 18 and 17.6% of those ages 65 or over.

=== 2010 census ===
As of the census of 2010, there were 277 people, 127 households, and 84 families residing in the city. The population density was 577.1 inhabitants per square mile (222.8/km^{2}). There were 162 housing units at an average density of 337.5 per square mile (130.3/km^{2}). The racial makeup of the city was 100.0% White.

There were 127 households, of which 23.6% had children under the age of 18 living with them, 55.9% were married couples living together, 6.3% had a female householder with no husband present, 3.9% had a male householder with no wife present, and 33.9% were non-families. 33.1% of all households were made up of individuals, and 15.8% had someone living alone who was 65 years of age or older. The average household size was 2.18 and the average family size was 2.71.

The median age in the city was 46.2 years. 20.9% of residents were under the age of 18; 7.2% were between the ages of 18 and 24; 20.9% were from 25 to 44; 28.9% were from 45 to 64; and 22% were 65 years of age or older. The gender makeup of the city was 47.3% male and 52.7% female.

== Education ==
Grainfield is served by Wheatland USD 292 public school district. The Wheatland High School mascot is Thunderhawks.

The Wheatland Shockers and Grinnell Warriors last sports season was in 2005–2006. In the fall of 2006, Wheatland/Grinnell Thunderhawks began.

The Wheatland/Grinnell Thunderhawks won the following Kansas State High school championships:

- 2015 Volleyball - 1ADII

The Wheatland Shockers won the following Kansas high school championships:

- 1974 Volleyball - Class 2A
- 1978 Volleyball - Class 2A
- 1980 Boys Cross Country - Class 2A
- 1981 Boys Cross Country - Class 1A
- 1982 Boys Cross Country - Class 2A
- 1982 Volleyball - Class 2A
- 1983 Boys Cross Country - Class 1A
- 1983 Volleyball - Class 1A
- 1983 Girls Cross Country - Class 1A
- 1984 Boys Cross Country - Class 1A
- 1984 Volleyball - Class 1A
- 1984 Boys Track & Field - Class 1A
- 1985 Boys Cross Country - Class 1A
- 1985 Volleyball - Class 1A
- 1986 Boys Cross Country - Class 1A
- 1987 Boys Cross Country - Class 2-1A
- 1987 Boys Basketball - Class 1A
- 1989 Volleyball - Class 1A
- 1990 Volleyball - Class 1A
- 1991 Volleyball - Class 1A

== Gallery ==
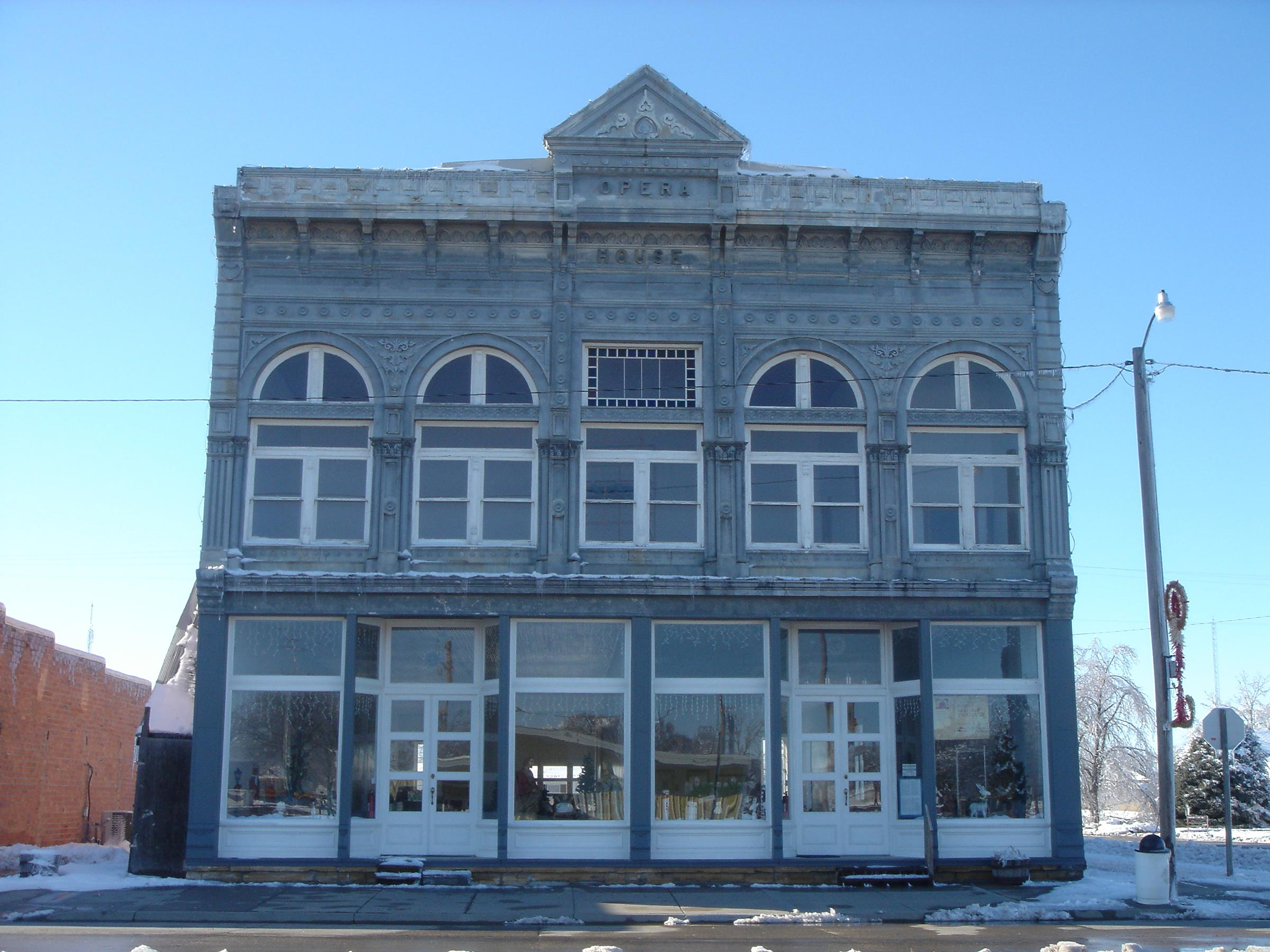
Grainfield Opera house

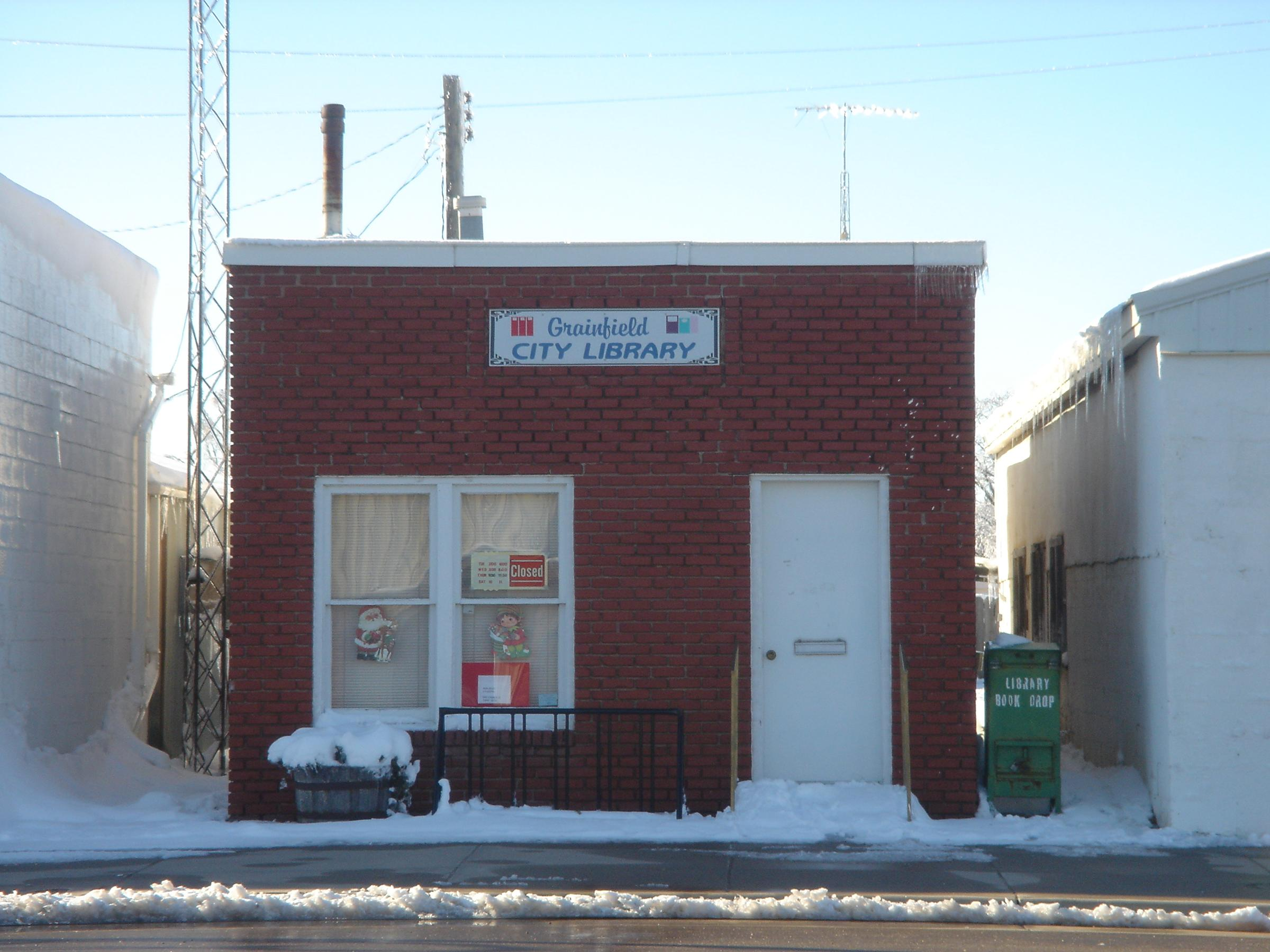
Grainfield city library
