= Meade, Kansas =

City in Meade County, Kansas

- City and County seat
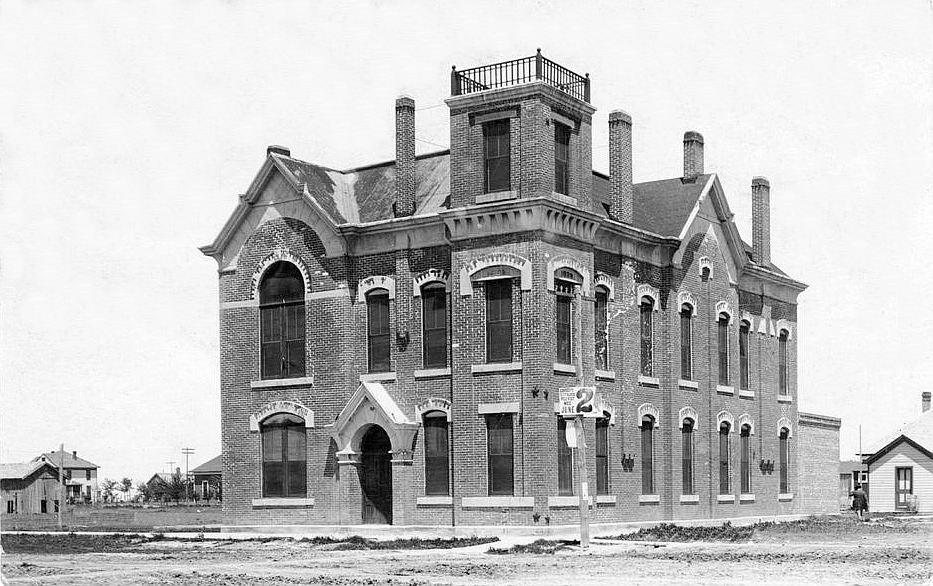
- Courthouse in Meade (1910)

- Location within Meade County and Kansas

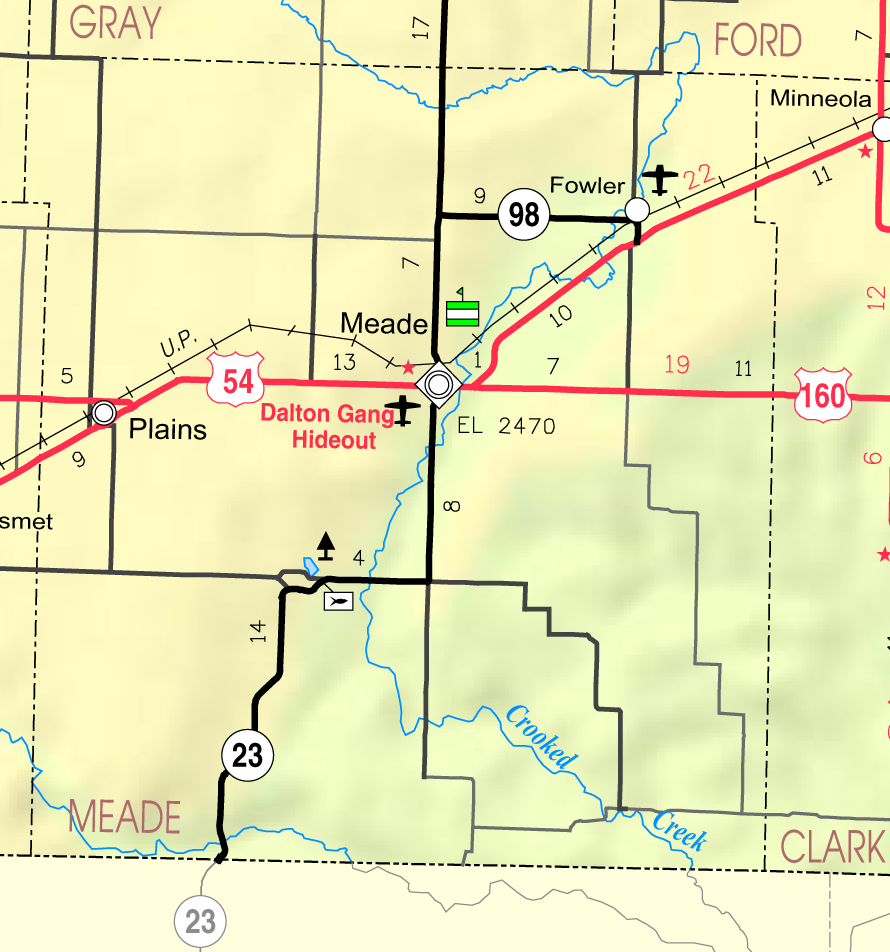
- KDOT map of Meade County (legend)
- Coordinates: 37°17′01″N 100°20′35″W
- Country: United States
- State: Kansas
- County: Meade
- Founded: 1880s
- Platted: 1885
- Incorporated: 1885
- Named for: Gen. George Meade

Area
  - Total: 1.46 sq mi (3.79 km^{2})
  - Land: 1.46 sq mi (3.79 km^{2})
  - Water: 0 sq mi (0.00 km^{2})
- Elevation: 2,500 ft (760 m)

Population (2020)
  - Total: 1,505
  - Density: 1,030/sq mi (397/km^{2})
- Time zone: UTC-6 (CST)
  - Summer (DST): UTC-5 (CDT)
- ZIP Code: 67864
- Area code: 620
- FIPS code: 20-45325
- GNIS ID: 2395076
- Website: cityofmeade.org

Meade is a city in and the county seat of Meade County, Kansas, United States. As of the 2020 census, the population of the city was 1,505.

== History ==
Meade was both laid out and incorporated in 1885. It was named for Gen. George Meade.

In August 2006, the town received national media attention due to the reaction after a rainbow flag was flown above The Lakeway Hotel. The hotel was vandalized repeatedly; bricks with slurs written on them were thrown through the hotel's window and the rainbow flag was cut down (and later replaced) by the hotel owner. Members of the hate group Westboro Baptist Church protested the flag being flown alongside the support of locals in the town.

== Geography ==
According to the United States Census Bureau, the city has a total area of 0.99 square miles (2.56 km^{2}), all land.

=== Climate ===
According to the Köppen Climate Classification system, Meade has a semi-arid climate, abbreviated "BSk" on climate maps.

Climate data for Meade, Kansas, 1991–2020 normals, extremes 1895–present
Month	Jan	Feb	Mar	Apr	May	Jun	Jul	Aug	Sep	Oct	Nov	Dec	Year
Record high °F (°C)	83 (28)	89 (32)	94 (34)	101 (38)	106 (41)	114 (46)	110 (43)	110 (43)	108 (42)	101 (38)	91 (33)	88 (31)	114 (46)
Mean maximum °F (°C)	67.0 (19.4)	71.9 (22.2)	82.1 (27.8)	87.9 (31.1)	94.7 (34.8)	101.0 (38.3)	104.4 (40.2)	102.1 (38.9)	99.3 (37.4)	91.7 (33.2)	76.9 (24.9)	66.4 (19.1)	105.4 (40.8)
Mean daily maximum °F (°C)	46.0 (7.8)	48.9 (9.4)	59.4 (15.2)	67.7 (19.8)	78.9 (26.1)	88.5 (31.4)	94.4 (34.7)	91.9 (33.3)	84.4 (29.1)	71.5 (21.9)	57.7 (14.3)	47.6 (8.7)	69.7 (21.0)
Daily mean °F (°C)	32.3 (0.2)	35.4 (1.9)	44.6 (7.0)	53.0 (11.7)	64.4 (18.0)	74.4 (23.6)	79.9 (26.6)	78.1 (25.6)	69.7 (20.9)	56.3 (13.5)	43.3 (6.3)	33.9 (1.1)	55.4 (13.0)
Mean daily minimum °F (°C)	18.6 (−7.4)	21.9 (−5.6)	29.8 (−1.2)	38.3 (3.5)	49.8 (9.9)	60.3 (15.7)	65.3 (18.5)	64.3 (17.9)	55.1 (12.8)	41.1 (5.1)	28.8 (−1.8)	20.2 (−6.6)	41.1 (5.1)
Mean minimum °F (°C)	5.2 (−14.9)	8.1 (−13.3)	14.6 (−9.7)	26.8 (−2.9)	38.0 (3.3)	50.1 (10.1)	57.2 (14.0)	58.1 (14.5)	42.5 (5.8)	26.9 (−2.8)	14.2 (−9.9)	5.3 (−14.8)	−0.8 (−18.2)
Record low °F (°C)	−20 (−29)	−23 (−31)	−6 (−21)	15 (−9)	27 (−3)	41 (5)	47 (8)	45 (7)	30 (−1)	8 (−13)	−1 (−18)	−17 (−27)	−23 (−31)
Average precipitation inches (mm)	0.85 (22)	0.70 (18)	1.67 (42)	1.94 (49)	2.78 (71)	3.67 (93)	3.37 (86)	2.71 (69)	1.56 (40)	2.22 (56)	0.61 (15)	0.96 (24)	23.04 (585)
Average snowfall inches (cm)	4.6 (12)	2.0 (5.1)	3.5 (8.9)	0.4 (1.0)	0.0 (0.0)	0.0 (0.0)	0.0 (0.0)	0.0 (0.0)	0.0 (0.0)	0.2 (0.51)	1.5 (3.8)	4.7 (12)	16.9 (43.31)
Average precipitation days (≥ 0.01 in)	3.1	3.5	4.4	5.7	7.0	7.9	7.5	7.1	4.9	4.7	3.2	3.3	62.3
Average snowy days (≥ 0.1 in)	2.0	1.4	1.1	0.2	0.0	0.0	0.0	0.0	0.0	0.2	0.7	1.8	7.4
Source 1: NOAA
Source 2: National Weather Service

== Demographics ==
Historical population
Census	Pop.	Note	%±
1890	457		—
1900	326		−28.7%
1910	664		103.7%
1920	838		26.2%
1930	1,552		85.2%
1940	1,400		−9.8%
1950	1,763		25.9%
1960	2,019		14.5%
1970	1,899		−5.9%
1980	1,777		−6.4%
1990	1,526		−14.1%
2000	1,672		9.6%
2010	1,721		2.9%
2020	1,505		−12.6%
U.S. Decennial Census

=== 2020 census ===
As of the 2020 census, Meade had a population of 1,505, with 611 households and 382 families. The population density was 1,028.0 per square mile (396.9/km^{2}). There were 735 housing units at an average density of 502.0 per square mile (193.8/km^{2}).

The median age was 42.4 years. 23.4% of residents were under the age of 18 and 22.9% were 65 years of age or older. For every 100 females, there were 100.1 males, and for every 100 females age 18 and over there were 94.4 males age 18 and over. 0.0% of residents lived in urban areas, while 100.0% lived in rural areas.

Of the 611 households, 28.3% had children under the age of 18 living in them. Of all households, 52.4% were married-couple households, 17.5% were households with a male householder and no spouse or partner present, and 26.5% were households with a female householder and no spouse or partner present. About 34.2% of all households were made up of individuals, and 19.3% had someone living alone who was 65 years of age or older. The average household size was 2.0 and the average family size was 2.7.

Of the 735 housing units, 16.9% were vacant. The homeowner vacancy rate was 2.9% and the rental vacancy rate was 17.0%.

Racial composition as of the 2020 census
Race	Number	Percent
White	1,297	86.2%
Black or African American	18	1.2%
American Indian and Alaska Native	5	0.3%
Asian	13	0.9%
Native Hawaiian and Other Pacific Islander	0	0.0%
Some other race	41	2.7%
Two or more races	131	8.7%
Hispanic or Latino (of any race)	138	9.2%

The percent of those with a bachelor's degree or higher was estimated to be 15.4% of the population.

The 2016–2020 5-year American Community Survey estimates show that the median household income was $56,121 (with a margin of error of +/- $5,715) and the median family income was $63,800 (+/- $7,923). Males had a median income of $40,441 (+/- $7,627) versus $25,000 (+/- $5,949) for females. The median income for those above 16 years old was $33,103 (+/- $5,082). Approximately, 3.3% of families and 5.0% of the population were below the poverty line, including 1.3% of those under the age of 18 and 4.3% of those ages 65 or over.

=== 2010 census ===
As of the census of 2010, there were 1,721 people, 670 households, and 454 families living in the city. The population density was 1,738.4 inhabitants per square mile (671.2/km^{2}). There were 766 housing units at an average density of 773.7 per square mile (298.7/km^{2}). The racial makeup of the city was 95.4% White, 1.0% African American, 0.6% Native American, 0.5% Asian, 1.1% from other races, and 1.3% from two or more races. Hispanic or Latino of any race were 6.1% of the population.

There were 670 households, of which 32.7% had children under the age of 18 living with them, 55.5% were married couples living together, 8.2% had a female householder with no husband present, 4.0% had a male householder with no wife present, and 32.2% were non-families. 29.1% of all households were made up of individuals, and 17.1% had someone living alone who was 65 years of age or older. The average household size was 2.42 and the average family size was 2.98.

The median age in the city was 41.3 years. 26.7% of residents were under the age of 18; 6.4% were between the ages of 18 and 24; 21.2% were from 25 to 44; 24.6% were from 45 to 64; and 21.2% were 65 years of age or older. The gender makeup of the city was 50.6% male and 49.4% female.

== Arts and culture ==
Located in Meade is the Dalton Gang Hideout and Museum, the outlaws who robbed banks and trains in the nineteenth century.

== Education ==
The community is served by Meade USD 226 public school district.
