= Sid Blanks =

American football player (1941–2021)

No. 42, 22
- Position: Running back

Personal information
- Born: April 29, 1941; Del Rio, Texas, U.S.
- Died: December 12, 2021 (aged 80); Webster, Texas, U.S.
- Listed height: 6 ft 1 in (1.85 m)
- Listed weight: 200 lb (91 kg)

Career information
- High school: San Felipe (Del Rio)
- College: Texas A&I
- NFL draft: 1964: 3rd round, 42nd overall pick
- AFL draft: 1964: 5th round, 38th overall pick

Career history
- Houston Oilers (1964–1968); Boston Patriots (1969–1970); Houston Texans-Shreveport Steamer (1974)

Awards and highlights
- AFL All-Star (1964); First-team Little All-American (1963); Second-team Little All-American (1961)

Career NFL/AFL statistics
- Rushing yards: 1,440
- Rushing average: 3.9
- Receptions: 106
- Receiving yards: 1,073
- Total touchdowns: 11
- Stats at Pro Football Reference

Sidney Blanks (April 29, 1941 – December 12, 2021) was an American professional football player who was a running back in the American Football League (AFL) and National Football League (NFL). He played college football for Texas A&I and was the first-ever black football player in the Lone Star Conference and the first African American player recruited and signed in the state of Texas. While Abner Haynes and Leon King played at North Texas two years earlier, neither were recruited. They were both walk-ons.

== College career ==
A halfback, Blanks played college football at Texas A&I University. Blanks was an All-American member of the Texas A&I Javelinas from 1960 to 1963. He was inducted into the Texas A&I Hall of Fame in 1981. In 2002 he was inducted into the Lone Star Conference Hall of Fame.

Recruited by College Football Hall of Fame coach Gil Steinke in 1960, Blanks was the first African American to play in the Lone Star Conference. He was also the first African American to receive a football scholarship at an integrated school in the state of Texas.

== Professional career ==
Blanks played professionally in the American Football League for the Houston Oilers from 1964 through 1968. He also played for the Boston Patriots of the AFL in 1969, and the Patriots of the NFL in 1970.

Blanks was an AFL All-Star in 1964.

== Personal life and death ==
To honor a “hero, legend and trailblazer,” the city of Del Rio named a park after Blanks near San Felipe Creek in 2015.

Blanks' son, Lance, was an analyst for ESPN, former NBA Executive and retired American professional basketball player who was selected by the Detroit Pistons in the first round of the 1990 NBA draft. His granddaughter Riley Blanks was a four-star recruit for the University of Virginia tennis team and is the founder of Woke Beauty.

Blanks died in Webster, Texas, on December 12, 2021, at the age of 80.

== See also ==
- List of American Football League players
