= James Holder =

James Holder may refer to:

- James Holder (businessman) (born 1971), British businessman
- James Holder (speedway rider) (born 1986), Australian speedway rider
- James Edward "Jim" Holder (1940–1966), American football player

== See also ==
- Cale James Holder (1912–1983), United States district judge
