= Wayne Rasmussen =

American football player (born 1942)

No. 47
- Position: Safety

Personal information
- Born: June 7, 1942 (age 84); Chicago, Illinois, U.S.
- Listed height: 6 ft 2 in (1.88 m)
- Listed weight: 175 lb (79 kg)

Career information
- High school: Howard (Howard, South Dakota)
- College: South Dakota State
- NFL draft: 1964: 9th round, 117th overall pick

Career history
- Detroit Lions (1964–1972)

Awards and highlights
- Second-team Little All-American (1963)

Career NFL statistics
- Interceptions: 16
- Fumble recoveries: 5
- Total touchdowns: 2
- Sacks: 1
- Stats at Pro Football Reference

Wayne Rasmussen (born June 7, 1942) is an American former professional football player who was a safety for the Detroit Lions of the National Football League (NFL). After his football career, he spent many years as an executive for Citibank at their Sioux Falls, South Dakota location, and is now retired in the Sioux Falls area.

Rasmussen graduated from Howard High School, located in Howard, South Dakota. Rasmussen played football, basketball and baseball at South Dakota State University. As point guard, he led South Dakota State to the NCAA Division II National Championship in 1963 and was named the tournament's Most Outstanding Player. Also, as a football player in college, he played wide receiver as well as defensive back.

He played as a defensive back for the Detroit Lions from 1964 to 1972.

He is an inductee of the South Dakota Hall of Fame and the South Dakota Sports Hall of Fame.
