= Neal Petties =

American football player (1940–2023)

- Petties in 1967

No. 84, 80
- Position: End

Personal information
- Born: September 16, 1940; San Diego, California, U.S.
- Died: June 9, 2023 (aged 82); National City, California, U.S.
- Listed height: 6 ft 2 in (1.88 m)
- Listed weight: 198 lb (90 kg)

Career information
- High school: San Diego
- College: San Diego State
- NFL draft: 1963: 14th round, 187th overall pick
- AFL draft: 1963: 21st round, 161st overall pick

Career history
- Baltimore Colts (1964–1966); Green Bay Packers (1968)*; Las Vegas Cowboys (1968); Hamilton Tiger-Cats (1969)*
- * Offseason or practice squad member only

Awards and highlights
- Second-team Little All-American (1963)

Career NFL statistics
- Receptions: 2
- Receiving yards: 20
- Touchdowns: 1
- Stats at Pro Football Reference

Cornelius "Neal" Petties (September 16, 1940 – June 6, 2023) was an American professional football end. He played for the Baltimore Colts from 1964 to 1966.

== College career ==
Petties played wide receiver for the Don Coryell's San Diego State Aztecs from 1961 to 1963. He led the team in receptions and receiving yards all three seasons and amassing 63 catches for 1,274 yards and 13 touchdowns. Pettis was a three-time all-California Collegiate Athletic Association honoree and as senior was a third-team little college Associated Press All-American. Petties played defense for the Aztecs, as well, recording seven interceptions. In 2006, Petties was inducted into the San Diego State Athletics Hall of Fame.

== Professional career ==
Petties was selected in the 14th round (187th overall) by the Baltimore Colts in the 1963 NFL draft and in the 21st round (161st overall) by the Oakland Raiders in 1963 AFL draft. He played three seasons with the Colts from 1964 to 1966, mainly on special teams. As a rookie, in 1964, he caught his only two NFL passes, including a touchdown reception from Tom Matte in the fourth quarter of the Colts 45-17 victory over the Washington Redskins.

Petties was selected in the 1966 NFL expansion draft by the Atlanta Falcons, but an injury led to Atlanta letting his go and he rejoined the Colts for the 1966 season.

In 1968, Petties played a season in Continental Football League for the Las Vegas Cowboys.

== After football ==
Following his football career worked for the city of San Diego for 25 years in the Park and Recreation Department as Director of Mountain View Park and part-time security for the Palisade Skating Rink. After retiring from the city, Neal went on to work for the San Diego Port District, and later as a job coach for the mentally challenged.

Petties died on June 6, 2023, at the age of 82. In July 2023, the city of San Diego renamed Mountain View Park as Neal Petties Mountain View Community Park.
