= History of the New England Patriots =

American football team history

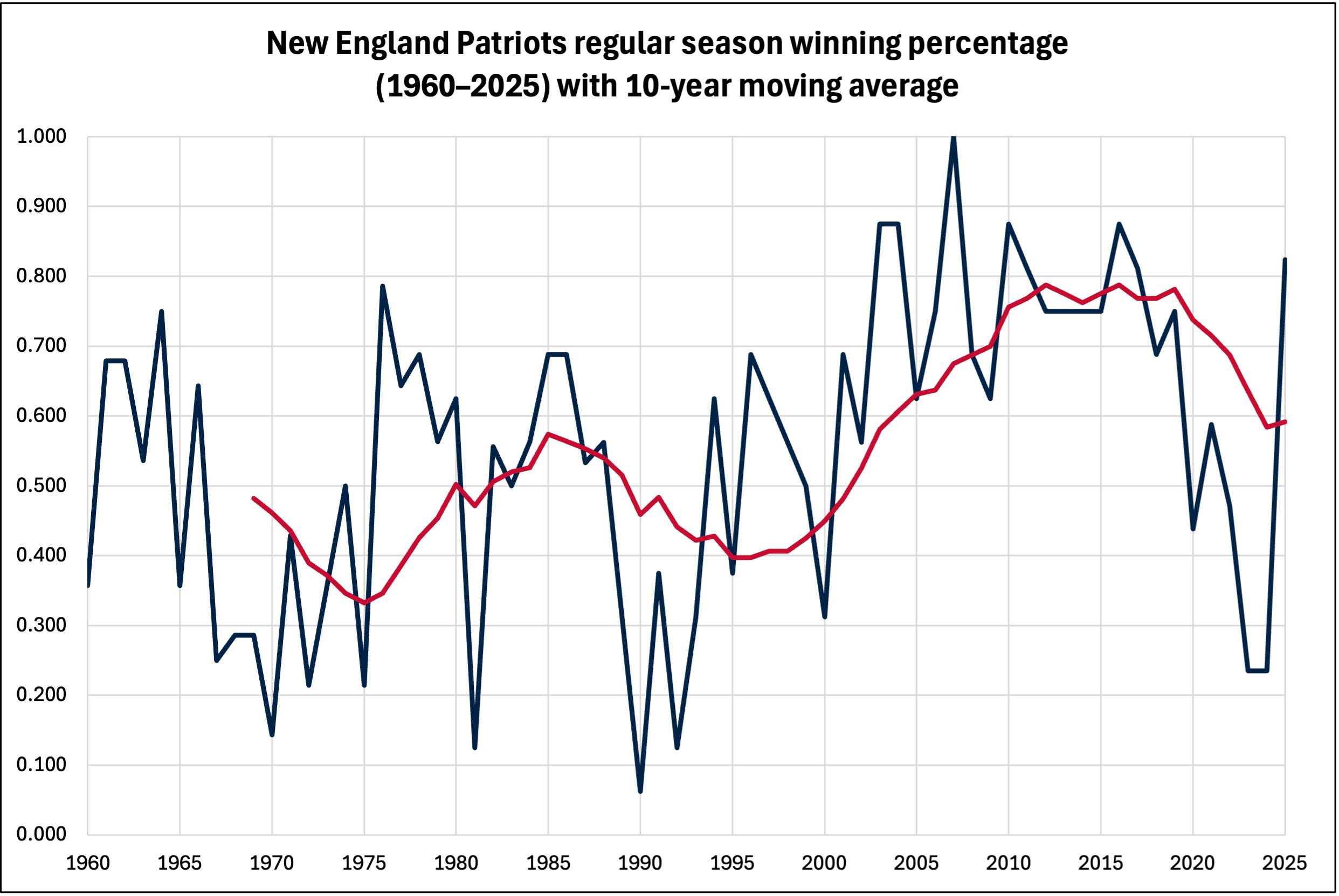
Regular season winning percentage, 1960–2025

This article contains an in-depth explanation of the history of the New England Patriots, a professional American football team that competes in the National Football League (NFL).

== Earlier NFL experience ==
Boston had previously been home to several NFL teams. The first was the Boston Bulldogs, which lasted only one season (1929). They were followed by the Boston Braves/Redskins, from 1932 to 1936. They played first at Braves Field and then at Fenway Park. The team moved to Washington following the 1936 season. The Boston Yanks played from 1944 to 1948 before moving to New York to become the New York Yanks.

== 1960–1969: AFL beginnings ==
On November 16, 1959, Boston business executive Billy Sullivan was awarded the eighth and final franchise of the developing American Football League (AFL). In addition to Billy and his brother Joe Sullivan, other initial investors in the team were John Ames, a lawyer, Dean Boylan, president of Boston Sand & Gravel, George Sargent, an insurance executive, Dom DiMaggio, former Boston Red Sox center fielder, Dan Marr, president of Marr Scaffolding Co, Ed McMann, president of the Northeast Packing Co, Paul Sonnabend, vice president of Hotel Corporation of America, and Edgar Turner, president of the 7-Up Distributors Corp. Each of the founders invested $25,000 to capitalize the team.

The following winter, locals were allowed to submit ideas for the Boston football team's official name. The most common one, and the one that Sullivan selected, was the "Boston Patriots," with "Patriots" referring to those colonists of the Thirteen Colonies who rebelled against British control during the American Revolution and in July 1776 declared the United States of America an independent nation. Immediately thereafter, artist Phil Bissell of The Boston Globe developed the "Pat Patriot" logo.

On July 30, 1960, the Boston Patriots defeated the Buffalo Bills in the first AFL pre-season game. The Boston Patriots played in the first-ever game in the American Football League, against the Denver Broncos on September 9, 1960, which they lost by a score of 10–13. The Boston Patriots defeated the Buffalo Bills in an AFL Eastern Division playoff game in 1963 and made it to the AFL Championship for the first time, but lost to the San Diego Chargers 51–10. During the 1963 season, nine Patriots made the AFL All-star team, including Gino Cappelletti, Nick Buoniconti, and Babe Parilli. In 1964, Linebacker Tom Addison, an original Patriot, founded and was selected President of the AFL Players Association. In the late 1960s, fullback Jim Nance became a top offensive player for the Patriots, gaining 1,458 yards during the 1966 season and 1,216 during the 1967 season. He was named the AFL MVP in 1966.

== 1970–1973: Post AFL–NFL merger ==
After the AFL–NFL merger in 1970, the league required that all teams reside in stadiums with at least 50,000 seats. Prior to 1970, The Patriots did not have a regular home stadium. Nickerson Field, Harvard Stadium, Fenway Park, and Alumni Stadium, served as home fields during their time in the American Football League. None of the four stadiums the Patriots had used up to that point qualified, and there was little room in Boston for a new stadium. Due to this, discussions about a possible relocation to Tampa, Florida occurred. Indeed, past attempts at pro football in Boston had been stymied by the lack of an adequate stadium.

In 1971, the Patriots moved into a new stadium in suburban Foxborough, Massachusetts, built on land granted by the Bay State Raceway. The team was renamed the New England Patriots on March 22, 1971, to reflect its new location. The original choice, Bay State Patriots was rejected by the NFL. The stadium, to be known as Schaefer Stadium, was built at a cost of about $6.2 million in only 327 days. The stadium was one of the first stadiums in the country to be named after a corporate sponsor, as the Schaefer Brewing Company paid $1 million for naming rights.

The first event held at the new Schaefer Stadium was a preseason game against the New York Giants on August 15, 1971. A massive traffic jam on Route 1 prevented many fans from getting in until halftime.

In 1971, the Patriots had a new quarterback, Heisman Trophy winner Jim Plunkett. Plunkett, from Stanford University, was the first overall selection in the 1971 NFL draft. The Patriots also signed free agent Randy Vataha, a wide receiver.

== 1973–1978: Fairbanks era ==
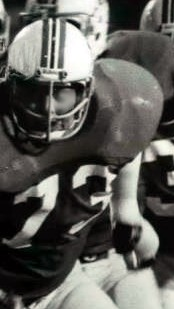
Hall of Fame offensive guard John Hannah, who played with the Patriots from 1973 to 1985, has been regarded among the best all-time offensive linemen.

The Patriots added three players to the team from the 1973 NFL draft; offensive guard John Hannah, who became the first career Patriot to make the Pro Football Hall of Fame; running back Sam Cunningham, the team's all-time leading rusher; and wide receiver Darryl Stingley.

In 1973, the team hired Chuck Fairbanks, who had been head coach at the University of Oklahoma, as head coach. The Patriots improved in Fairbanks's second season, 1974, finishing 7–7. During the 1975 season, QB Plunkett was injured and the team ended the season 3–11. Following the 1975 season, Plunkett was traded to the San Francisco 49ers, and eventually would win two Super Bowls with the Oakland Raiders.

The draft picks acquired in the Plunkett trade were used to select defensive backs Mike Haynes and Tim Fox. The Patriots finished the 1976 season 11–3, their best record in team history to that point, and advanced to the playoffs for the first time since 1963 as a wild card-berth.

=== 1976 playoffs ===
The Patriots played the Oakland Raiders in the first round of the playoffs. Late in the game, the Patriots were leading the Raiders, 21–17. On a 3rd-down play late in the 4th quarter, Patriots defensive tackle Ray "Sugar Bear" Hamilton sacked Oakland quarterback Ken Stabler, which would have forced the Raiders into a 4th-down situation. However, referee Ben Dreith called a roughing the passer penalty on Hamilton, nullifying the sack and giving the Raiders an automatic 1st down. The penalty was debated later, but gave the Raiders the opportunity to score. Stabler scored on a short touchdown run with less than a minute left, and the Raiders held on for a 24–21 win.

=== 1977–1978 ===
The 1977 season was a disappointing one for the Patriots, due in part to contract holdouts by offensive linemen John Hannah and Leon Gray. The Patriots finished 9–5, one game out of first place in the AFC East, and out of the playoffs.

In a 1978 preseason game against the Raiders, wide receiver Darryl Stingley was paralyzed from the neck down from a tackle by Oakland's Jack Tatum. The Patriots finished 11–5 for their first post-merger AFC East championship. However, hours before the final game of the regular season, coach Chuck Fairbanks announced he would be leaving the team to become head coach at the University of Colorado. Owner Billy Sullivan immediately suspended Fairbanks, and offensive coordinator Ron Erhardt and defensive coordinator Hank Bullough were left to coach the final game without a head coach. Fairbanks was reinstated for the playoffs, but the team lost its divisional playoff game 31–14 to the Houston Oilers, which also was the first Patriots post-season game at Schaefer Stadium.

== 1979–1984: Coaching changes ==
For the next two years, the Patriots would suffer late-season losses that denied them return trips to the playoffs. In 1979, after starting 7–3, the team lost five out of their last eight games, to finish 9–7 and out of the playoffs. In 1980, with running back Sam Cunningham holding out all season, the Patriots started 6–1 but finished 10–6, again out of the playoffs. The Patriots continued to slide in 1981, finishing 2–14.

Following the 1981 season, Erhardt was fired and replaced by Ron Meyer, who had been the head coach at Southern Methodist University. The Patriots had the top draft pick overall in the 1982 NFL draft and selected Kenneth Sims, a defensive end from the University of Texas at Austin.

In the strike-shortened 1982 season, the highlight of the Patriots' campaign was the "Snowplow Game", a controversial 3–0 late-season win over the Miami Dolphins. The controversy came in the 4th quarter when the Patriots were preparing for a field goal attempt. Mark Henderson, a convict on work release, used a tractor to clear a swath of field to aid the Patriots. Kicker John Smith's 33-yard attempt was good, and they were the only points scored by either team that afternoon. The win helped put the Patriots in the playoffs, but the first-round rematch in Miami was won by the Dolphins.

In 1983, the naming-rights deal for the stadium with Schaefer expired, and the stadium was renamed Sullivan Stadium. Also in 1983, quarterback Tony Eason was drafted in the first round. Eason played sparingly in 1983, but became the Patriots' starting quarterback in 1984. The team ended the season 8-8.

The Patriots, with the top pick in the 1984 NFL draft, selected Irving Fryar, a wide receiver from the University of Nebraska. With Tony Eason starting at quarterback, the Patriots got off to a 5–2 start. However, after a few losses, the Patriots fired head coach Ron Meyer and replaced him with former Baltimore Colts wide receiver Raymond Berry. The team won three of their first four games under Berry. The team lost several games late in the 1984 season, and finished out of the playoffs at 9–7.

== 1985: First Super Bowl appearance ==
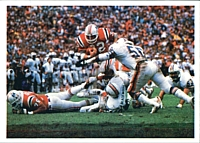
Craig James rushes the ball against the Dolphins in the 1985–86 AFC Championship Game.

After struggling to start the 1985 season, and Eason suffering a shoulder injury in October, coach Raymond Berry replaced Eason with Grogan. Grogan broke his leg during the 12th game of the season and Eason took over as starting quarterback. New England won six straight games and finished 11–5. They then beat the New York Jets 26–14, earning a wild card berth to the playoffs.

In the divisional playoff against the Los Angeles Raiders, the Patriots forced six turnovers and won 27–20. Dawson started the game with a touchdown, then when the Patriots were kicking off in the 4th quarter, a fumble by the Raiders resulted in a touchdown for Jim Bowman. After beating the Raiders, the Patriots were set to play the Miami Dolphins in the AFC Championship. Days before the championship game, Irving Fryar was injured in a domestic incident and had to have his hand cast. The Patriots defeated the Dolphins 31–14. Eason threw touchdowns to running back Tony Collins and tight end Derrick Ramsey early in the game. Later, a touchdown by Mosi Tatupu won the Patriots the AFC Championship of 1985. They went on to the Super Bowl XX, where they faced the Chicago Bears.

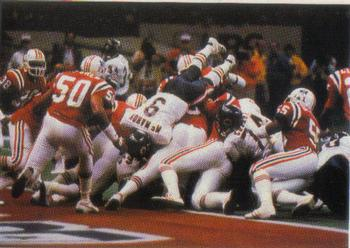
The Patriots' defense attempting to stop a Bears' end zone rushing play during Super Bowl XX.

In the Super Bowl, the Patriots took an early 3–0 lead after Walter Payton fumbled in the 1st quarter, resulting a field goal by Tony Franklin. The Bears would scored 44 points, including a touchdown by rookie defensive lineman William "The Refrigerator" Perry. The Patriots made one touchdown, at the end to make the final score 46–10.

== 1986–1992: Ownership changes and struggles ==
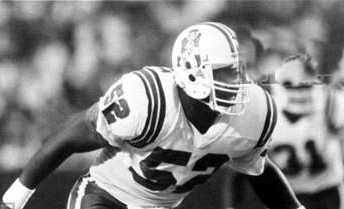
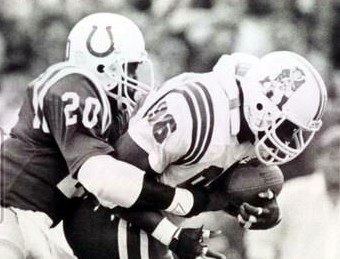
Defensive players Johnny Rembert (left) and Brent Williams (right) are members of the Patriots' All-1980s and All-1990s Team, respectively.

Soon after the 1985 Super Bowl, Boston Globe sportswriter Ron Borges wrote a story alleging that six Patriots players, including Fryar, cornerback Raymond Clayborn, safety Roland James, and running back Tony Collins were marijuana users. In May 1986, allegations surfaced that Fryar was involved in gambling of NFL games. In July 1986, offensive lineman John Hannah retired.

In 1986, the Patriots' strength was their passing game, led by Eason and receiver Stanley Morgan, who gained nearly 1,500 yards receiving. The Patriots led the AFC East with an 11–5 record and traveled to Denver to take on the Broncos in the divisional playoffs. A 4th-quarter touchdown pass from John Elway to Vance Johnson won the game for Denver.

In 1987, the Patriots acquired Doug Flutie from Natick, Massachusetts, who won the Heisman Trophy for Boston College in 1984. He was acquired by the Patriots during the 1987 players' strike and crossed the picket line to play his first game for the Patriots. However, late-season injuries put the Patriots out of playoff contention at 8–7. In 1988, the Patriots finished the season 9–7, narrowly missed the playoffs.

During this time, the Sullivan family lost millions of dollars on poor investments, most notably from producing The Jackson 5 1984 Victory Tour. The Sullivans' losses from the Victory Tour impacted the operation of the Patriots. The Sullivans had never been among the wealthier NFL owners, and had been forced to pledge Sullivan Stadium as collateral to finance the Victory Tour in 1984. The losses from the Victory Tour were reportedly equivalent to the family's net worth, and the revenue from the Patriots was not enough to service the debt even after the team made it to the Super Bowl. The losses from the Victory Tour forced the Sullivans to put the Patriots and Sullivan Stadium on the market in 1985.

In August 1985, The Boston Globe reported that the Sullivans were looking to sell the Patriots, Sullivan Stadium, and their lease on Foxboro Raceway due to the family's financial and legal problems. On April 10, 1986, a group of six Pennsylvania businessmen led by Fran Murray and Drew Lewis purchased a three-year option to acquire the team, stadium, and racetrack lease. They later sold the option to Jeffrey Chodorow, however Chodorow and the Sullivans were unable to come to terms on a sale. Buddy LeRoux began negotiations to purchase the team in December 1986, however, due to a lack of progress on the deal, he withdraw his offer on March 17, 1987. The following year, the Sullivans entered negotiations to sell the team and stadium to Donald Trump, however, because Trump was funding a lawsuit against the league at that time, it was unlikely he would be approved by the league's owners and the deal was abandoned. Robert Tisch, Robert Kraft, Peter de Savary, and Joe O'Donnell also made offers for the team.

By the start of 1988, the Sullivans were heading for bankruptcy and at one point had to get a $4 million advance from the league to make payroll. Sullivan sought to sell 50% of the team's shares to the public. The NFL turned down this request out of hand. Instead, it appointed a four-man committee vested with what amounted to "wartime powers" to resolve the Patriots' finances by any means necessary–up to and including selling the team. However, NFL Commissioner Pete Rozelle made clear that it would be untenable for the Patriots to remain under the Sullivans' control. For all intents and purposes, the Sullivan era was over.

After an attempt to sell a stake in the team to Reebok CEO Paul Fireman fell through, the Sullivans sold the team to Remington Products magnate Victor Kiam in 1988 for $90 million, though Billy Sullivan remained team president. However, the stadium lapsed into bankruptcy, and Kiam was outbid for it by Boston paper magnate Robert Kraft.

In 1988, the Patriots missed the playoffs by one game. The 1989 season was bad for the team. Three of the team's defense players, Andre Tippett, Garin Veris and Ronnie Lippett, were injured in the same preseason game. The team rotated the quarterback job throughout the season. The Patriots waived Eason during the season and he was picked up by the Jets. The Patriots finished the season 5–11.

Following the season, Flutie left for the Canadian Football League, and general manager Dick Steinberg left to take a job with the New York Jets. Berry was fired and replaced by Pittsburgh Steelers defensive coordinator Rod Rust for 1990. The Patriots finished with the worst season in franchise history in 1990 – a 1–15 record.

The day after the team's only win that year, Boston Herald reporter Lisa Olson accused several Patriots players of sexually and verbally assaulting her in the team's locker room. Kiam called Olson a "classic bitch" after the report. Following an investigation into the accusations, NFL Commissioner Paul Tagliabue fined the team $50,000, and players Zeke Mowatt, Michael Timpson and Robert Perryman $12,500, $5,000, and $5,000 respectively. Their season finale against the New York Giants was a sellout; however, most of the fans at the game were Giants fans. The team lost that game, missing a game-tying field goal in the closing seconds.

After the 1990 season, the Patriots changed their front office. Rust was fired and replaced by Dick MacPherson, who had been the coach at Syracuse University. Additionally, Sam Jankovich, who had been athletic director at the University of Miami and oversaw the improvement of their athletic program, was brought on as CEO of the Patriots.

The Patriots improved in 1991. Hugh Millen took over as quarterback partway through the season. The Patriots ended the season at 6–10 with several upsets over playoff teams, including wins against the Minnesota Vikings and future AFC Champion Buffalo Bills.

In May 1992, St. Louis businessman and Anheuser-Busch heir James Orthwein purchased Kiam's majority stake in the Patriots. Kiam was in severe financial straits and owed Orthwein millions. With most of his money tied up in either Remington or the Patriots, Kiam was forced to sell the team in order to repay Orthwein. Rumors began swirling of a possible move of the Patriots to St. Louis, given Orthwein's desire to return an NFL team to his hometown. The Patriots finished the 1992 season, 2–14, leading to the departures of MacPherson and Jankovich.

== 1993–1996: Drew Bledsoe and Bill Parcells era ==
=== 1993 ===
In 1993, the Patriots hired Bill Parcells, a two-time Super Bowl winner, as head coach. Also in 1993, the uniforms and logo were changed. The old "Pat Patriot" logo was retired and replaced with a Patriot head, designed in tandem with NFL Properties that many fans would eventually call "Flying Elvis". The team's primary color changed from red to blue, and the helmets from white to silver.

The Patriots had the first pick in the 1993 NFL draft, and selected quarterback Drew Bledsoe from Washington State. They also drafted linebacker Chris Slade. Bledsoe started the season as the starting quarterback, but was injured and replaced with former Dolphins backup Scott Secules.

The 1993 season began with a 1–11 record, but ended the season by winning their last four games in a row, over Cincinnati, Cleveland, Indianapolis, and over Miami in overtime in the finale, eliminating the Dolphins from the playoffs.

=== 1993–1994 offseason: Bob Kraft buys the team ===
Throughout the 1993 season, rumors continued that the team was going to move to St. Louis. In the 1993 off-season, the issue reached its climax. Orthwein offered Robert Kraft, the team's landlord since 1988, $75 million to break the lease on Foxboro Stadium, which bound the team to continue playing there until at least 2002. However, Kraft refused. Orthwein was not willing to continue operating the team in New England, and put it up for sale. Kraft knew that the terms of the operating covenant required any potential buyer to deal with him. With this in mind, he staged what amounted to a hostile takeover of the Patriots, offering to buy the team himself for a then-NFL record $160 million in 1994. Although future St. Louis/Los Angeles Rams owner Stan Kroenke offered more money than Kraft, Orthwein would have been saddled with as much as $20 million in relocation costs, as well as any legal expenses resulting from breaking the lease. With Kraft making it clear that he would seek an injunction that would have forced Kroenke or any other potential buyer to keep the Patriots in Foxborough, Orthwein was all but forced to accept Kraft's bid.

On February 26, 1994, Kraft's first full day as owner of the Patriots, the team sold a record number of season tickets. In September, the Patriots sold out the entire 1994 season. Every Patriots home game-preseason, regular season, and playoffs-has been sold out since.

=== 1994 ===
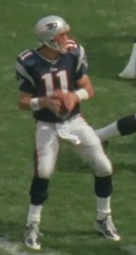
Quarterback Drew Bledsoe

Halfway through the 1994 season, the Patriots were 3–6 and had lost 4 straight games when they faced the Minnesota Vikings for Week 10. Drew Bledsoe started a second-half comeback by switching to a no-huddle offense. Bledsoe set single-game records for pass attempts and completions, and the Patriots won the game 26–20 in overtime. The Patriots won their last seven games of the regular season, finishing 10–6 and making the playoffs as a wild card. In the first round of the playoffs, the Patriots were beaten by the Cleveland Browns 20–13.

=== 1995 ===
The Patriots drafted Curtis Martin in the third round of the 1995 NFL draft. The Patriots won their opening day match against the Browns. Martin had a good season as a rookie, winning the conference rushing title and was named Rookie of the Year. Bledsoe struggled with injuries, the team struggled with inconsistency, and the Patriots finished 6–10.

During the 1995, the Patriots had their first home appearance on Monday Night Football since 1981. During the Patriots' last appearance on the program, a number of fans in attendance proved to be rowdy and uncontrollable, and there were over 60 arrests at the game. As a result of this behavior, the Town of Foxborough and the NFL refused to schedule Monday night home games in New England. During 1995, Robert Kraft lobbied for the Town of Foxborough and the NFL to schedule the Patriots on a Monday night. The NFL granted Kraft's request, scheduling the Patriots on Monday, October 23, in a game against the Buffalo Bills. The Patriots won the game, 27–14, and the crowd was peaceful and orderly, with only a handful of isolated disturbances and arrests.

Also during 1995, the primary home station for most Patriots regular season games changed. Since 1965, the games had aired on WBZ-TV, Boston's NBC affiliate. After owner Westinghouse Broadcasting switched the station's affiliation to CBS, WHDH-TV took on airing the NFL on NBC package locally.

=== 1996: Second Super Bowl appearance ===
In the 1996 NFL draft, the Patriots selected wide receiver Terry Glenn with their first round draft pick. The Patriots started out lackluster in 1996. After an early-season loss to the Redskins at home dropped the Patriots to 3–3, the Patriots won their next four games, and finished the season 11–5. The Patriots won the AFC East and earned a first-round bye in the playoffs as the #2 seed. The Patriots defeated the Pittsburgh Steelers 28–3 in a divisional playoff game. They then beat the Jacksonville Jaguars 20–6 in the first AFC Championship game played in Foxboro. The team advanced to Super Bowl XXXI against the Green Bay Packers.

In the months and years after Kraft's purchase of the Patriots, relations between Kraft and Parcells were increasingly strained. This was primarily due to a struggle over Parcells' authority over football operations as Kraft wanted Parcells to yield some of his authority over personnel moves to a separate general manager. The conflict climaxed in the days leading up to the Super Bowl, with rumors that Parcells would leave the Patriots after the season to take the vacant head coaching job with the New York Jets. During the game the Patriots were close to the Packers for much of the game, and took the lead briefly in the 2nd quarter. However, two long Brett Favre touchdown passes and a Super Bowl record 99-yard kickoff return for a touchdown by MVP Desmond Howard gave the Packers their 12th title. The final score was 35–21.

== 1997–1999: Pete Carroll years ==
=== 1997 ===
After the Super Bowl, Parcells resigned from the Patriots. Kraft believed that Jets were trying to hire Parcells in time for him to have say in the Jets' selections in the 1997 NFL draft. Since The Jets couldn't hire Parcells as their head coach in 1997 because of an earlier contract renegotiation, they hired Parcells as a consultant and Bill Belichick as head coach. Kraft requested a 1st-round draft pick in return for allowing Parcells to coach elsewhere. He also called the Jets' agreement "a transparent farce" that "demonstrated it was the Jets' intention all along for Bill Parcells to become head coach of the Jets for the '97 season." Parcells claimed the Jets had been given league permission for the consulting agreement, the NFL denied any permission was given, and had commissioner Paul Tagliabue arrange an agreement between the two sides. The Patriots received two picks in the 1997 NFL draft, a second round pick in the 1998 draft, and a first round pick in the 1999 draft in return for allowing Parcells to become the Jets' head coach.

After former San Francisco 49ers head coach George Seifert turned down the job, Kraft hired Pete Carroll as the new head coach of the Patriots. In 1997, the Patriots won the AFC East with a 10–6 record, but some key losses meant the team had to play in the wild card round in the playoffs. After beating the Miami Dolphins 17–3 in Foxboro, the Patriots played the Pittsburgh Steelers in Pittsburgh. A late fumble won the game for Pittsburgh, 7–6.

=== 1998 ===
During the 1998 offseason, the Patriots offered restricted free agent running back Curtis Martin a $1.153 million contract. However, the Jets signed Martin, and per restricted free agency rules, ceded their 1st- and 3rd-round picks in the 1998 NFL draft to the Patriots. With the 1st-round pick, the Patriots selected running back, Robert Edwards.

Their game against the Buffalo Bills on November 29, 1998 was controversial due to a series of questionable calls. With under a minute to go and down by four points, the Patriots played a long drive. However, the Buffalo defense appeared to stop the Patriots on 4th down with a juggled catch out of bounds. The referees needed to determine whether receiver Shawn Jefferson was inbounds, caught the ball, and achieved first down yardage. The referee on the sideline signaled first down after a conference with other officials. Several Bills claimed one said "just give it to them" in the huddle. Television instant replays showed that Jefferson was short of first down yardage, but the NFL had discontinued use of instant replay after the 1991 season. This call was followed by a questionable pass interference decision made in the end zone on what would have been the game's final play. Bledsoe hit tight end Ben Coates for a touchdown on the final untimed play of the game. In protest, the Bills left the field.

Drew Bledsoe and Terry Glenn were both injured later the season, and the Patriots got the last playoff spot with a 9–7 record. The Patriots lost 25–10 against the Jacksonville Jaguars in the first playoff game.

Although Robert Edwards had a promising rookie season, his career was derailed after he suffered a dislocated knee in Hawaii while playing a game of flag football on the beach.

Also during 1998, most Patriots games moved back to WBZ-TV after a three-year absence.

=== 1999 ===
Taking Edwards' place in 1999 were veteran Terry Allen and rookie Kevin Faulk. The Patriots opened with a 30–28 victory over the New York Jets, followed by hosting the Indianapolis Colts and second-year quarterback Peyton Manning. Manning raced the Colts to a 28–7 halftime lead, but was limited to just 13 second-half passing yards as Drew Bledsoe threw three touchdowns. After an Edgerrin James fumble, Adam Vinatieri kicked the winning field goal in a 31–28 final. After a 27–3 win over the Arizona Cardinals, Coates went to the media to protest that he was not being thrown to enough. After this, the team stumbled and finished 8–8 and out of the playoffs. Following the season, Carroll was fired, while Vice President of Player Personnel Bobby Grier was retained only until the 2000 NFL draft.

== 2000–2019: Brady/Belichick dynasty ==
=== 2000: Belichick hired and Brady drafted ===
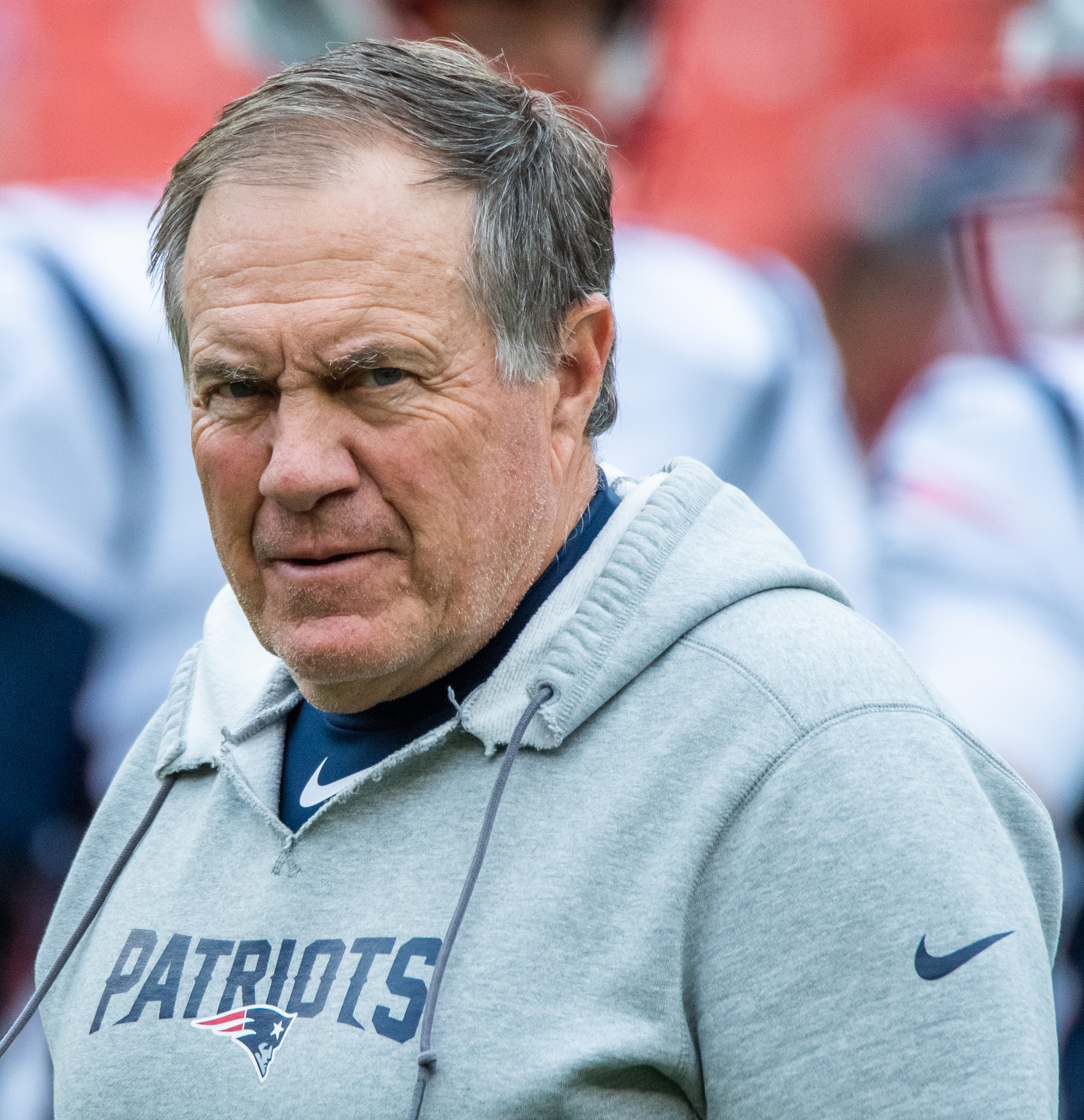
Longtime head coach Bill Belichick transformed the Patriots into a perennial Super Bowl contender.

Pete Carroll was fired as head coach in January 2000 and owner Robert Kraft attempted to hire Jets assistant head coach Bill Belichick for the Patriots' head coaching position. Belichick had been an assistant coach under Parcells with the Patriots in 1996, but followed Parcells to the Jets. After the 1999 season, Parcells resigned as head coach of the Jets and retired from NFL coaching. Belichick succeeded him as head coach, but resigned at a press conference the following day, citing the uncertainty over the Jets' ownership after the death of Leon Hess as his reason. The Jets denied Belichick permission to speak with other teams and the NFL upheld Belichick's contractual obligations to the Jets. Belichick filed an antitrust lawsuit against the NFL. After negotiations, the Patriots and Jets agreed to a compensation package that allowed Belichick to become the Patriots' head coach. The deal had the Patriots send their first round pick in the 2000 NFL draft and fourth and seventh round picks in the 2001 draft to the Jets, while receiving the Jets' fifth round selection in 2001 and seventh round pick in 2002.

Belichick restructured the team's personnel department in the offseason. The Patriots finished the 2000 season 5–11 and missing the playoffs. Also in 2000, the Patriots updated their uniforms.

=== 2001: First Super Bowl Championship ===
In 2001, Drew Bledsoe signed a 10-year contract extension and offensive tackle Bruce Armstrong retired. Wide receiver Terry Glenn didn't show up to training camp in August and was suspended by the NFL for the first four games of the season due to violating substance abuse policies. During the training camp, quarterbacks coach Dick Rehbein died of cardiac arrest on August 6 at the age of 45.

The Patriots lost their opener to the Cincinnati Bengals, and in the first post-9/11 game, against the Jets, Bledsoe was injured, shearing a blood vessel in his chest after being tackled by Jets linebacker Mo Lewis. Tom Brady, a sixth round pick in the 2000 NFL draft, took over for Bledsoe. He remained the team's starting quarterback after Bledsoe was cleared to play two months later. During the season, first-round draft pick Richard Seymour anchored the defensive line and Antowain Smith, a free agent signed from Buffalo, ran over 1,000 yards. The Patriots won their final six games to capture the AFC East with an 11–5 record. The Patriots won a first-round bye as the #2 seed in the playoffs.

In the final game played at Foxboro Stadium, the Patriots hosted the Oakland Raiders in a snowstorm. This game became known as the "Tuck Rule Game", when a play originally ruled to be a Brady fumble was reversed by referee Walt Coleman as an incomplete pass based upon the obscure "tuck rule." After review, Coleman ruled that, because Brady's arm was moving forward when he lost the ball, he was deemed to have been in the act of throwing when he lost control of the ball. Had the original ruling stood, the Raiders would have clinched the win. Instead, the Patriots kicker Adam Vinatieri tied the game with a 45-yard field goal in the final 30 seconds. The Raiders did not attempt to run a play at the end of regulation and, after losing the coin toss to start overtime, didn't get the ball again. The Patriots drove downfield on their opening possession and won the game, 16–13.

The Patriots faced the Steelers in the AFC Championship Game. After Brady injured his ankle in the second quarter, Bledsoe came off the sideline and led the team to their only offensive touchdown of the game. In the second half, with two special teams touchdowns and two fourth-quarter interceptions of passes thrown by Pittsburgh's Kordell Stewart, the Patriots upset the Steelers 24–17 to advance to Super Bowl XXXVI.

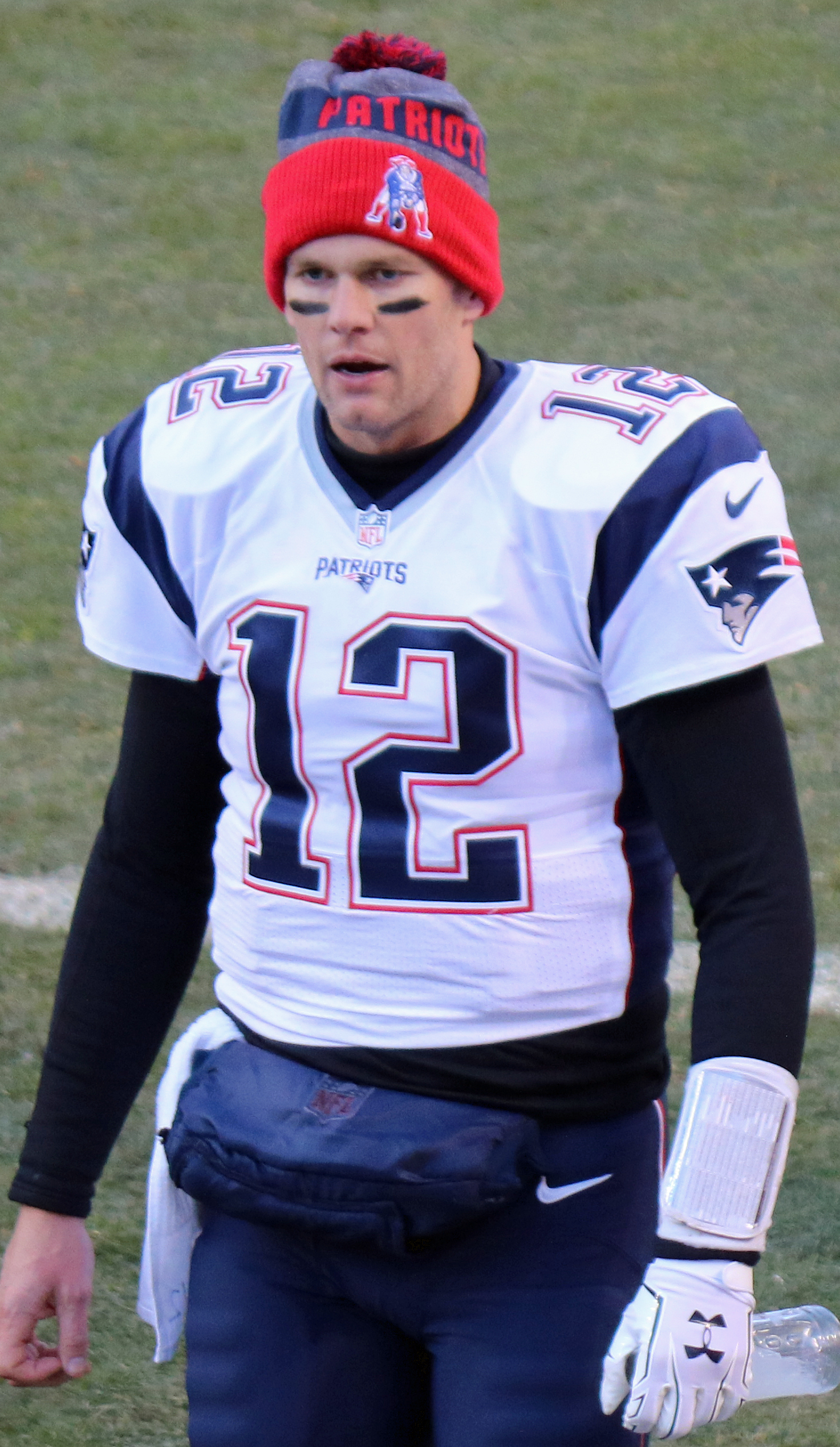
Quarterback Tom Brady led the Patriots to six Super Bowl wins and nine Super Bowl appearances.

In the Super Bowl, the Patriots faced the St. Louis Rams, led by league MVP Kurt Warner. During the game, Bill Belichick used a defensive game plan that used the blitz sparingly, but chipped the Rams receivers and running back Marshall Faulk as they went into their patterns. This plan forced three turnovers.

Belichick's defense held the Rams off until the 4th quarter, but after trailing 17–3 early in the quarter, St. Louis scored two touchdowns to tie the game at 17–17. With 1:30 to go and no time-outs, Brady led New England's offense downfield to the Rams' 30-yard line, setting up Adam Vinatieri, who won the game with a 48-yard field goal as time expired, giving the Patriots their first Super Bowl win. Brady was selected Super Bowl MVP.

The Patriots' victory parade in Boston was attended by approximately 1.2 million fans. During the offseason, Brady signed a long-term contract with the team and Bledsoe was traded to the Buffalo Bills for a 1st-round pick in the 2003 NFL draft.

=== Gillette Stadium ===
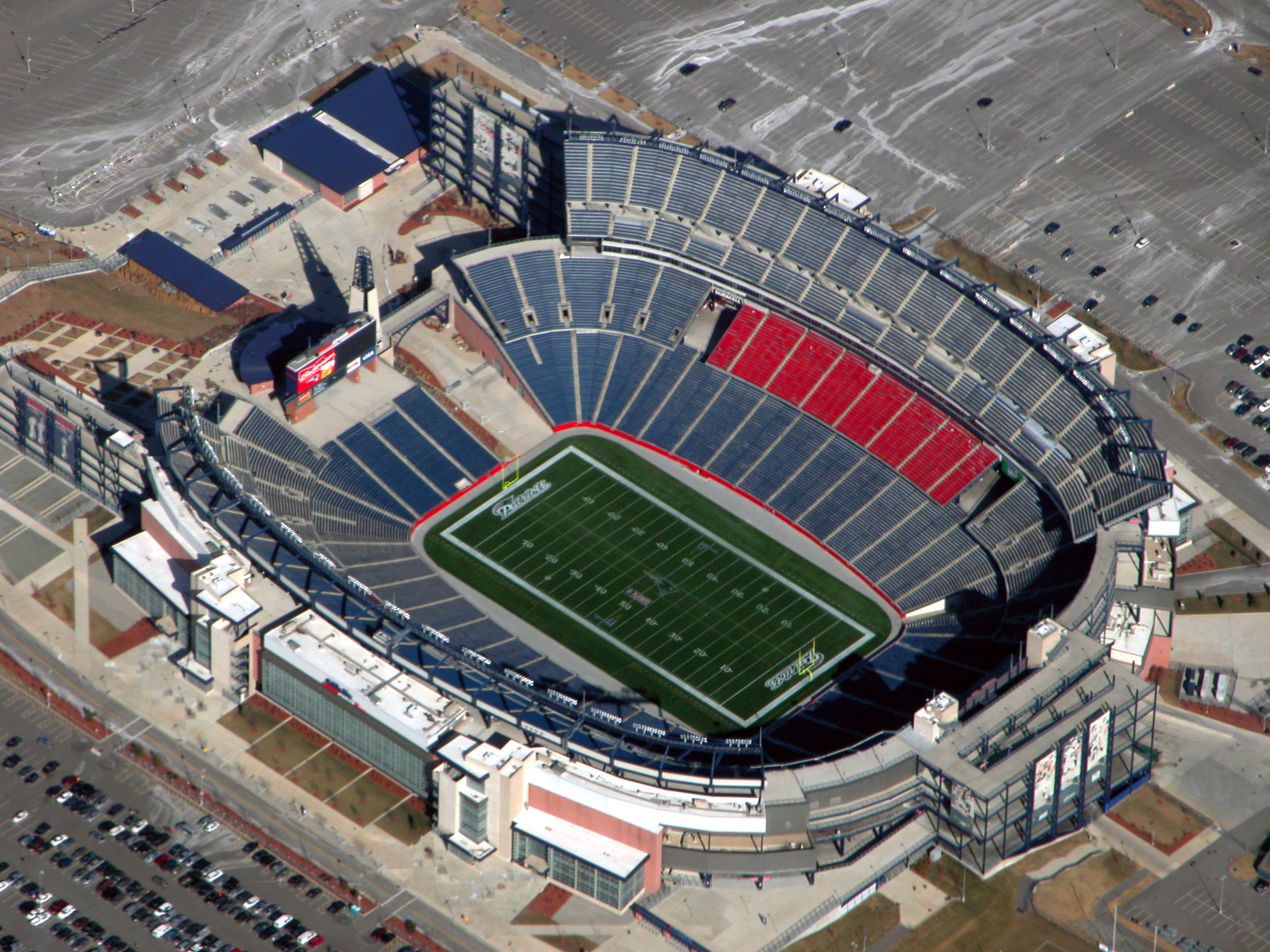
Gillette Stadium

While owning the Patriots, Robert Kraft attempted to build a new stadium. In 1998, Kraft came close to a deal with the Massachusetts Legislature to build a new stadium adjacent to the old stadium, with the state providing $75 million for infrastructure improvements. However, Massachusetts House Speaker Tom Finneran refused to support the bill and the deal failed. Afterwards, Kraft reached a deal with Connecticut Governor John G. Rowland to build a new stadium in Hartford, Connecticut. However, after the stadium plan was approved by the Connecticut General Assembly, problems were discovered with the proposed site that would delay construction. At this time, the NFL announced loan incentives where teams could borrow money from the league to build new stadiums.

In 1999, Kraft announced that he was abandoning the Hartford stadium project. Kraft reached a deal with the Massachusetts legislature for infrastructure improvements around the stadium. The stadium received approval from the citizens of Foxborough for the new stadium. The naming rights to the stadium were originally purchased by CMGi, an e-commerce company based in nearby Waltham, Massachusetts. CMGi Corporation sold the naming rights to Boston-based Gillette.

=== 2002: Narrowly missing the playoffs ===
Following their victory in Super Bowl XXXVI, the Patriots won their first game in the new Gillette Stadium in the NFL's prime-time Monday Night Football opener against the Pittsburgh Steelers. After three wins to begin the season, including a 44–7 road win against the division rival New York Jets, the team lost five of its next seven games. In the final week of the season, the Patriots defeated the Miami Dolphins on an overtime Adam Vinatieri field goal to give both teams a 9–7 record. The Jets also finished with a 9–7 record after a win over the Green Bay Packers. Due to their record, the Jets won the tiebreaker for the division title, which eliminated the Patriots and Dolphins from the playoffs.

=== 2003–2004: Back-to-back Super Bowl titles ===
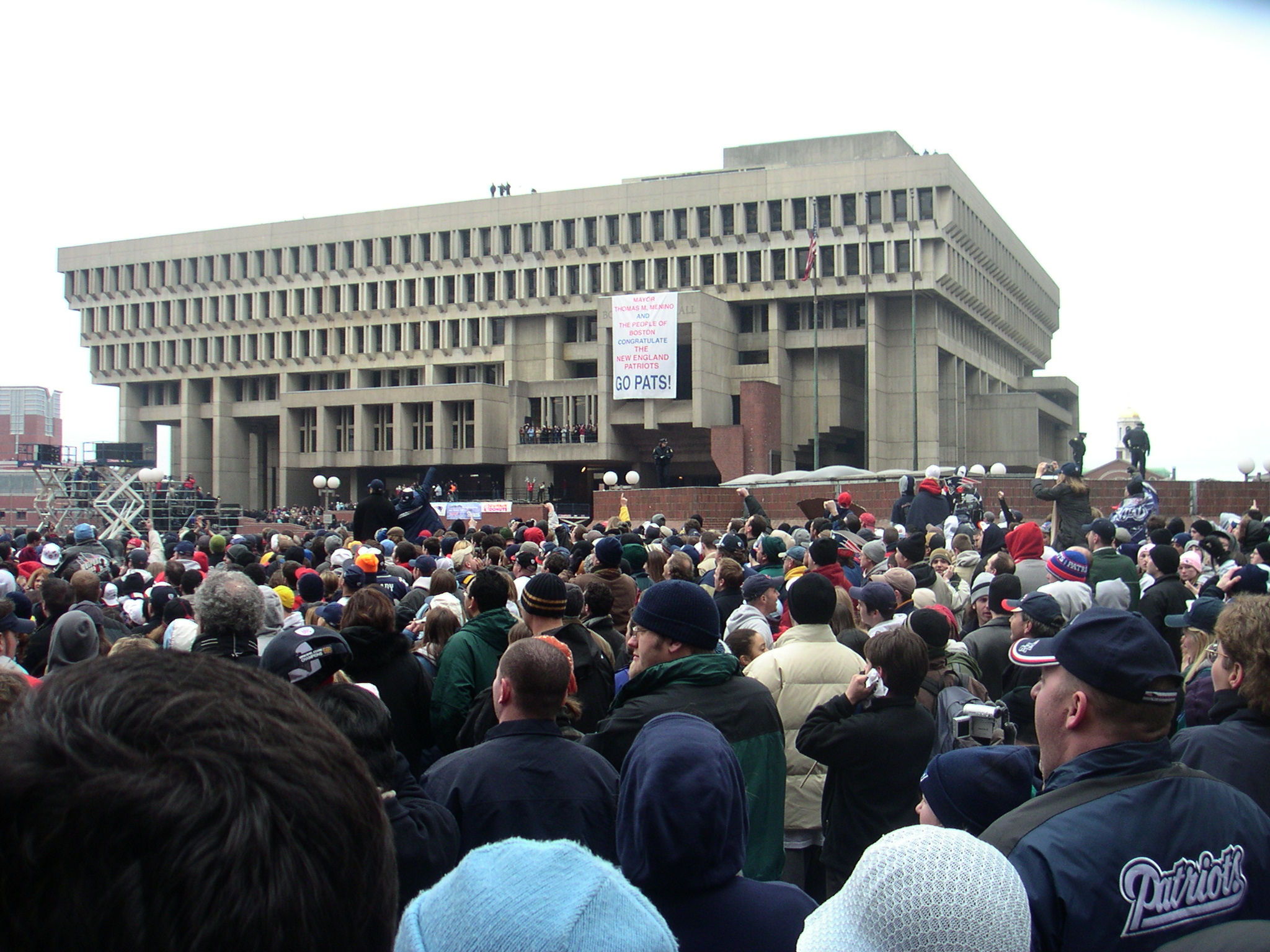
Patriot fans rally in front of Boston City Hall following the Super Bowl XXXVIII championship

Days before the start of the season, safety Lawyer Milloy was released, prompting second-guessing of head coach Bill Belichick by fans. A report by ESPN analyst Tom Jackson stated that Patriots players "hated their coach". The accusation was later denied by players. Milloy signed with the Buffalo Bills, who defeated the Patriots 31–0 in the season opener. After starting with a 2–2 record, the Patriots didn't lose another game.

The Patriots had the NFL's best record at 14–2 and earned the top seed in the AFC 2003–04 playoffs, earning home-field advantage. Their opponent in the divisional playoffs was the Tennessee Titans. Played in a temperature of 8 °F (−13 °C), the Patriots and Titans played close until Adam Vinatieri kicked the go-ahead field goal with 4 minutes left. An incomplete Steve McNair pass on 4th down with 1:40 left won the game 17–14 for New England. The Patriots faced the Indianapolis Colts for the AFC Championship and won 24–14. The Patriots returned to the Super Bowl, facing the Carolina Panthers.

The first half of Super Bowl XXXVIII was a defensive battle between the teams. The teams traded touchdowns late in the 2nd quarter, then more quick strikes by both teams made the score 14–10 Patriots at halftime. The 3rd quarter was scoreless, but running back Antowain Smith scored on the first play of the 4th quarter to make it 21–10. Carolina scored two more touchdowns, but failed to convert on both to take a 22–21 lead. The Patriots played a trick pass to linebacker Mike Vrabel, followed by Kevin Faulk's run for a two-point conversion that put the Patriots up 29–22 with 2:51 left to play. The Panthers drove downfield and Ricky Proehl's late touchdown catch tied the game, 29–29 with 1:08 to play. Brady led the Patriots on a drive and Vinatieri kicked a 41-yard field goal with four seconds left. The Patriots won their second Super Bowl, 32–29, and Brady was once again named MVP.

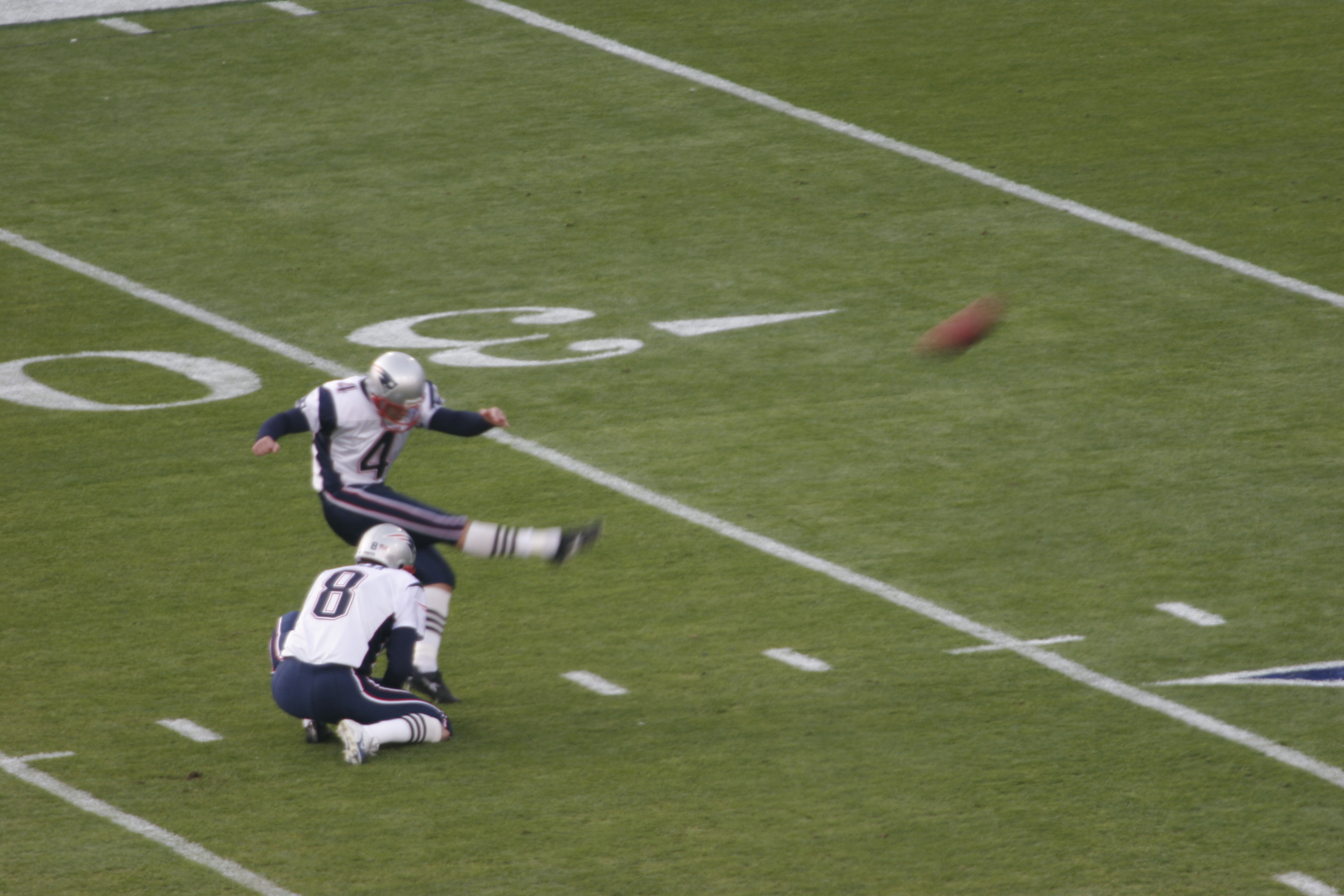
Adam Vinatieri warms up prior to Super Bowl XXXIX.

Following their Super Bowl win, the Patriots traded a second-round draft pick for Cincinnati Bengals' running back Corey Dillon, who replaced Antowain Smith. The Patriots set the NFL record for consecutive regular season victories after winning their first six games of the season. During a loss to the Pittsburgh Steelers on October 31, cornerback Ty Law was injured. Combined with the loss of other starting cornerback Tyrone Poole two weeks earlier, the Patriots completed the regular season and playoffs with second-year cornerback Asante Samuel, undrafted free agent Randall Gay, and wide receiver Troy Brown at cornerback.

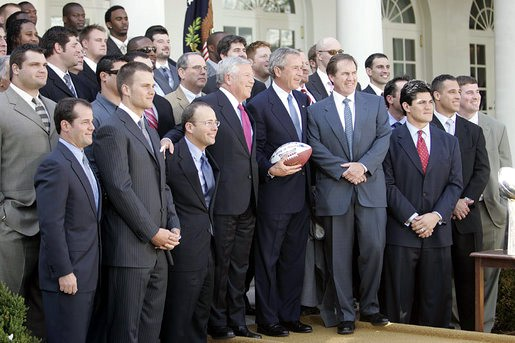
President George W. Bush poses with the New England Patriots during a ceremony honoring the Super Bowl XXXIX champions in the Rose Garden.

With a 14–2 record and the second seed in the AFC playoffs, the Patriots defeated the Colts at home in the playoffs. The Patriots then defeated the top-seeded Steelers on the road, 41–27, in the AFC Championship Game. The Patriots' defeated the Philadelphia Eagles in Super Bowl XXXIX 24–21 in their second straight Super Bowl victory. As of 2024, the 2003–2004 New England Patriots were the most recent back-to-back NFL champions until the 2023-2024 Kansas City Chiefs.

=== 2005–2006: Playoff losses ===
Two weeks after winning Super Bowl XXXIX, linebacker Tedy Bruschi suffered a stroke. Also during the off-season cornerback Ty Law was released. During Week 3, Rodney Harrison was injured and didn't play for the rest of the season. Beginning the season with a 4–4 record, the Patriots lost their first game at home since 2002 against the San Diego Chargers in Week 4. Bruschi returned to the field against the Buffalo Bills on October 31. The team ended the season on a 5–1 run to finish 10–6, earning their third straight AFC East title. With the #4 seed in the AFC playoffs, the Patriots defeated the Jacksonville Jaguars 28–3 in the wild-card round. The Patriots fell to the Denver Broncos 27–13 on the road in the Divisional Playoffs, committing five turnovers in the game.

The Patriots entered the 2006 season without their two starting wide receivers from 2005; David Givens left in free agency and Deion Branch was traded to Seattle after a contract hold out. They were replaced by Reche Caldwell and Jabar Gaffney. Losses in November ended the team's streak of 57 games without consecutive losses, three games shy of the NFL record. With a 12–4 record and their fourth straight division title, the Patriots entered the playoffs as the #4 seed, defeating the New York Jets 37–16 in the Wild Card game of the playoffs. A 24–21 win over the top-seeded San Diego Chargers on the road set the Patriots up to face the Indianapolis Colts in the AFC Championship. Despite a 21–3 lead in the 2nd quarter, the Patriots stumbled down the stretch and the Colts emerged with a 38–34 victory.

=== 2007: 18–1 season ===
In 2007, the Patriots added Donte' Stallworth, a free agent, and traded for Wes Welker and Randy Moss. Welker led the NFL in receptions in 2007, and Moss set an NFL record with 23 touchdown catches. In September, head coach Bill Belichick and the Patriots were penalized by the NFL for videotaping opponents' defensive signals from an unauthorized location during their Week 1 game against the New York Jets. The press called this situation Spygate. Belichick was fined $500,000, the maximum allowed under league rules, and the Patriots were fined $250,000 and required to forfeit their first round pick in the 2008 draft.

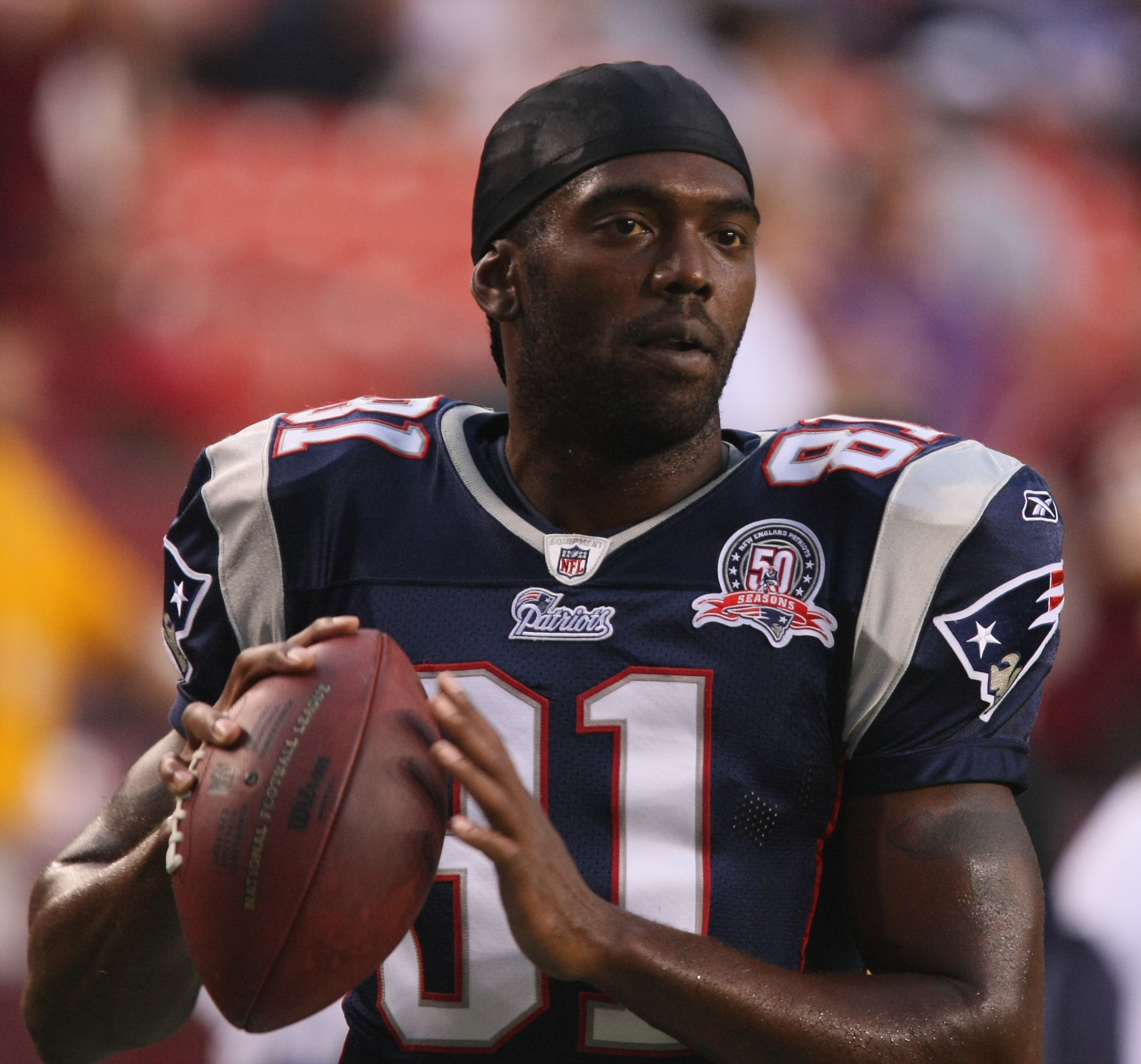
Randy Moss caught a league-record 23 touchdowns in 2007, which greatly helped Tom Brady pass for 50, also a record.

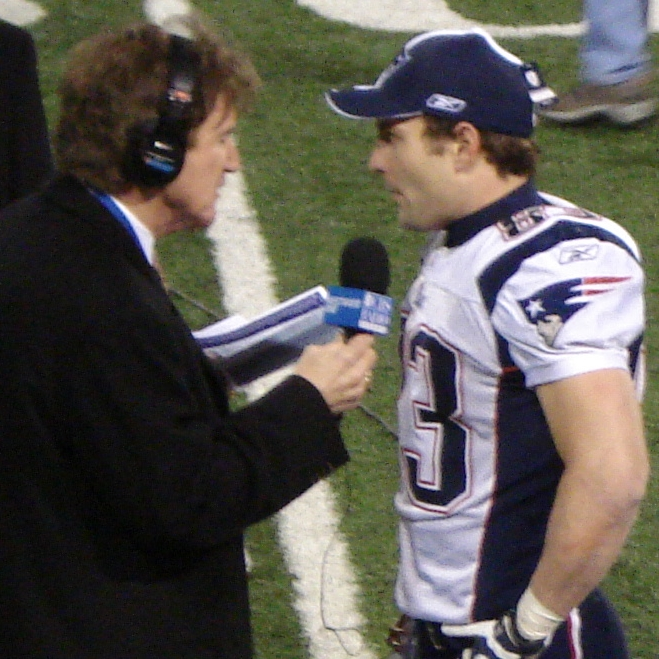
Wes Welker (right) was known by few before becoming a Patriot.

The Patriots won the AFC East before their eleventh game, the fourth time since the NFL introduced the 16-game schedule in 1978 that a team won a division title by its eleventh game. The Patriots finished the regular season with the first 16–0 record in NFL history. During the game, Brady and Moss connected on two touchdown passes, with Moss setting his 23-touchdown record and Brady setting a then-NFL record with 50 touchdown passes on the season. It was the first undefeated regular season in the NFL since the 1972 Miami Dolphins finished 14–0. Tom Brady earned his first NFL MVP award, while the Patriots' offense broke multiple records, including those for points scored and total touchdowns.

With the #1 seed in the AFC playoffs, the Patriots defeated both the Jacksonville Jaguars 31–20 and San Diego Chargers 21–12 before advancing to Super Bowl XLII. The Patriots had the chance for a perfect 19–0 season with a victory over the New York Giants and analysts saw the 2007 Patriots as being the greatest team in NFL history.

Despite being Super Bowl favorites, the Patriots faltered against a Giants drive late in the fourth quarter. A dramatic pass from Eli Manning to David Tyree put the Giants deep in Patriots territory, and a Manning touchdown pass to Plaxico Buress gave the Giants a 17–14 lead with 35 seconds left.

=== 2008: The Cassel year ===
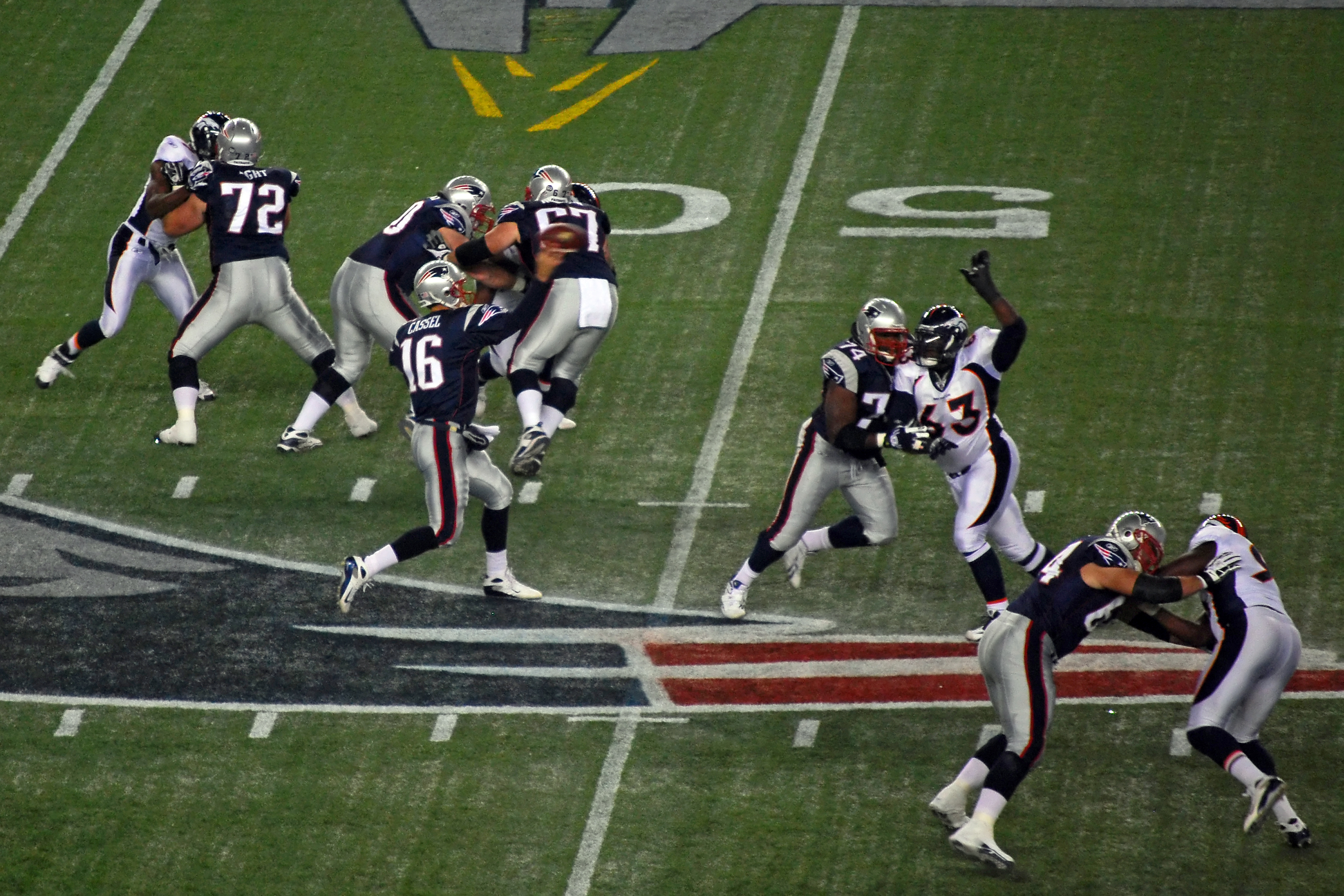
Matt Cassel throws a pass in place of injured Tom Brady in 2008.

In the 2008 season opener, quarterback Tom Brady suffered a serious knee injury and missed the remainder of the season. Backup quarterback Matt Cassel replaced Brady. During Cassel's first start in Week 2 he led the Patriots to a win, which extended the team's regular-season winning streak record to 21 games.

The Dolphins, Ravens and Patriots all finished the season with identical 11–5 records. Miami qualified for the playoffs by winning the AFC East division over the Patriots on the fourth divisional tiebreaker. Baltimore qualified for the playoffs as a wild card team, defeating the Patriots on the second wild card tiebreaker.

=== 2008–2009 offseason: Changes ===
During the offseason, the Patriots' offseason made a number of front office, coaching, and personnel changes. Vice President of Player Personnel Scott Pioli departed to become the general manager of the Kansas City Chiefs. Offensive coordinator Josh McDaniels was hired as the head coach of the Denver Broncos. Quarterback Matt Cassel, was traded to the Chiefs along with veteran linebacker Mike Vrabel in March. Defensive starters Tedy Bruschi and Rodney Harrison both retired, while All-Pro defensive end Richard Seymour was traded to the Oakland Raiders for a 1st-round pick in the 2011 NFL draft.

=== 2009–2010: Early playoff exits ===
In the 2009 season opener on Monday Night Football, the Patriots celebrated their 50th season with an American Football League "legacy game" against the Buffalo Bills. Down 11 points late in the 4th quarter, the Patriots scored two touchdowns, winning the game. It was also Brady's first game back after his injury in the 2008 opener. In November, the 6–2 Patriots traveled to face the undefeated Indianapolis Colts; with a six-point lead late in the 4th quarter, the Patriots tried to convert a 4th and 2 situation inside their own 30-yard line but failed, setting up a Colts touchdown and the Patriots' third loss of the season. After losing two of their next three games, the Patriots went on to win three in a row to secure a division title. With the #3 seed in the AFC playoffs, the Patriots faced the Baltimore Ravens at home in the Wild Card Playoffs. The Ravens opened up a 24–0 lead in the 1st quarter, and the Patriots ended their season with a 33–14 loss.

The Patriots went into 2010 without either a named offensive or defensive coordinator following the departure of defensive coordinator Dean Pees. After beating Cincinnati in the season opener, they lost 28–14 to the Jets. They finished the season 14–2. By defeating the Bills in Week 16, New England swept that team for the sixth consecutive season, along with earning another AFC East title and the #1 seed. Tom Brady finished the regular season with an NFL-record 335 consecutive pass attempts without an interception, while the Patriots committed an NFL-record low 10 turnovers on the season.

The Patriots were favored to go to Super Bowl XLV, but lost to the Jets team in the divisional playoffs.

=== 2011: Return to the Super Bowl ===
During the 2010 off-season, the Patriots drafted Arkansas quarterback Ryan Mallett. The team also made two trades for defensive lineman Albert Haynesworth and wide receiver Chad Ochocinco.

In the first game of the 2011 season, the Patriots played the Miami Dolphins on Monday Night Football, and New England won 38–24. Brady set a personal single-game record with 517 passing yards, highlighted by an NFL record-tying 99-yard touchdown reception by Wes Welker. They beat the San Diego Chargers in Week 2 in their home opener, but their 15-game win streak against the Buffalo Bills ended when Tom Brady threw four interceptions, and the Patriots lost 34–31 on a last-second field goal. The team then won three games in a row. During the Patriots' bye in Week 7, an incident occurred where tight end Rob Gronkowski was seen in a photo with an adult film actress wearing his game shirt. Following a 25–17 loss to the Pittsburgh Steelers, wide receiver Julian Edelman was arrested for indecent assault following an incident in a Back Bay nightclub on Halloween. The Patriots won their last eight games to take the top seed in the AFC playoffs.

After defeating the Denver Broncos 45–10 in the Divisional Game, the Patriots won the AFC Championship Game over the Baltimore Ravens 23–20, after Ravens receiver Lee Evans dropped a potential touchdown and kicker Billy Cundiff missed a game-tying 31-yard field goal attempt in the closing seconds. The Patriots lost to the NFC champion New York Giants 21–17 in Super Bowl XLVI.

=== 2012–2013: Playoff losses in AFC Championship ===
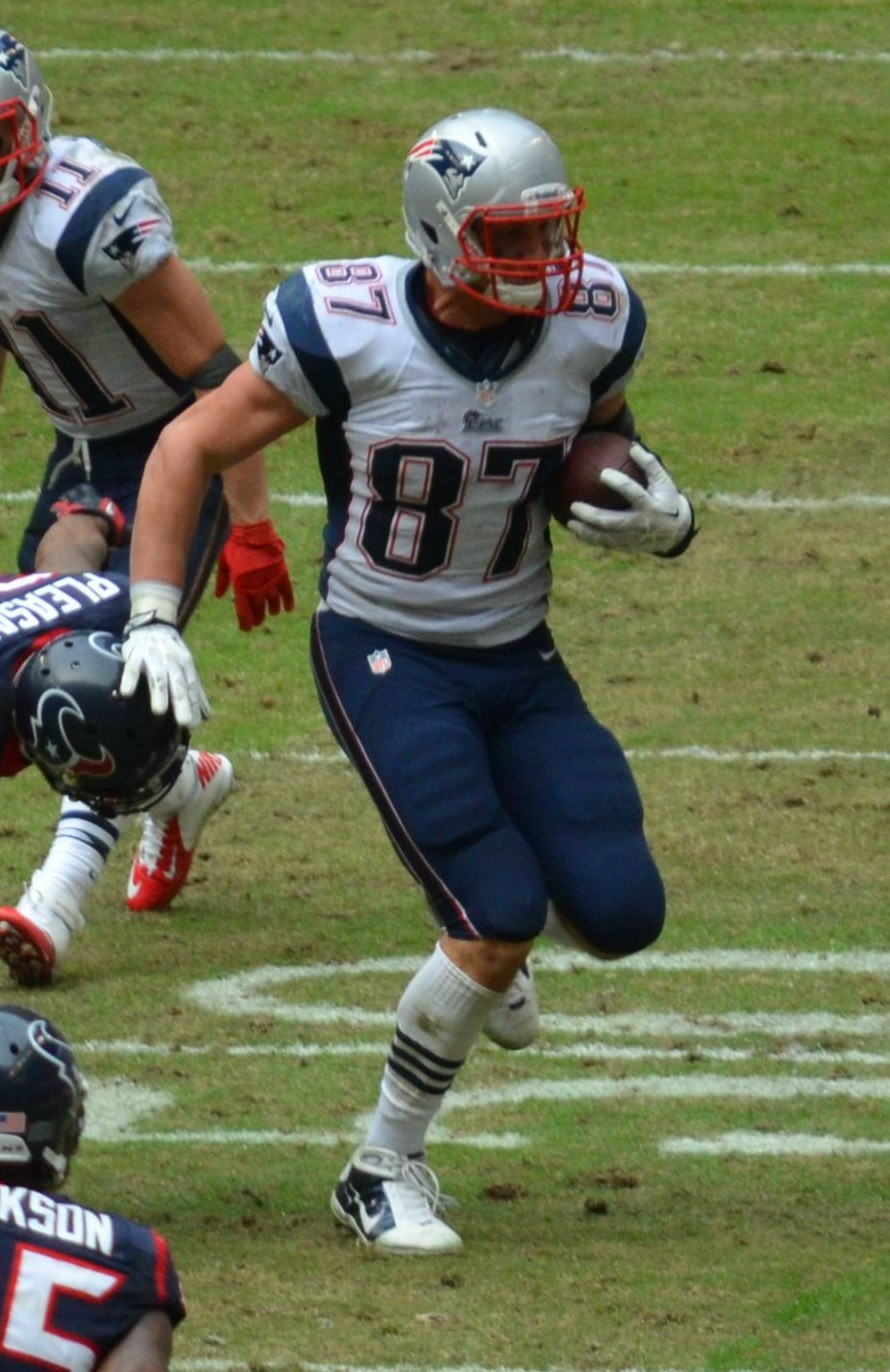
Rob Gronkowski in 2013.

In their 2012 season opener, the Patriots defeated the Tennessee Titans before losing at home to the Arizona Cardinals. In Week 3, New England lost to the Baltimore Ravens 30–28 on a last-second field goal. The first three games of the season were officiated by replacement referees, as the regular referees were locked out during a contract dispute. The replacement referees were criticized, and at the end of the Ravens game, Bill Belichick made contact with a referee as he was leaving the field to argue a call, which the league fined him for. In Week 4, the Patriots defeated the Buffalo Bills 52–28. After that, the Patriots went on the defeat the Denver Broncos 31–21, but lost to the Seattle Seahawks 24–23 the following week. The Patriots then defeated the New York Jets in overtime, 29–26, and continued on a seven-game win streak. The Patriots ended the season as the #2 seed in the AFC. The Patriots were given a bye week before they had to face the Houston Texans, who they defeated 41–28. They then had faced the Baltimore Ravens and lost 28–13.

The 2013 season saw turnover on the offensive side, as Wes Welker signed a contract with the Denver Broncos, and tight end Aaron Hernandez was released from the team due to legal issues. The Patriots opened the season 4–0 before losing to the Cincinnati Bengals 13–6 in Week 5. After a home win against the New Orleans Saints in Week 6, the Patriots fell to the rival New York Jets 30–27 on a converted Nick Folk field goal following an unsportsmanlike penalty to rookie Chris Jones. The team then had a pair of wins against the Miami Dolphins and the Pittsburgh Steelers, but lost 24–20 on Monday Night Football to the Carolina Panthers following the bye week on a controversial end-game interception by Luke Kuechly. New England finished as the AFC East champions, earning the No. 2 seed and a first round bye.

=== 2014: Fourth Super Bowl Championship ===
In 2014, the Patriots finished 12–4 and won their sixth straight AFC East title. They were the top seed, had a first round bye and had home field advantage for the AFC playoffs.

The Patriots defeated the Baltimore Ravens 35–31 in the divisional round of the playoffs. They then defeated the Indianapolis Colts 45–7 to advance to Super Bowl XLIX against the defending Super Bowl champions Seattle Seahawks. After a scoreless first quarter, both teams exchanged two touchdowns to make it 14–14 at halftime. Seattle then scored a field goal and a touchdown to take a 10-point lead going into the final quarter. The Patriots rallied, scoring two touchdowns to take a 28–24 lead with 2:02 remaining. After the Seahawks drove all the way to the 1 yard line with under a minute to go, rookie cornerback Malcolm Butler caught an interception on Seattle's final offensive play, winning the game for the Patriots. Brady won his third Super Bowl MVP award.

=== 2015: AFC Championship loss ===
The Patriots started the year 10–0, before losing on Sunday Night Football to the Denver Broncos, 30–24 in overtime. During the season, multiple players were injured; at one point nineteen players were placed on injured reserve. At the end of the season, they earned a first round bye, with the second seed in the AFC.

In the divisional round of the playoffs, the Patriots defeated the Kansas City Chiefs, 27–20. Advancing to the AFC Championship game, the Patriots were matched up against the top-seeded Broncos. The final game in the Tom Brady–Peyton Manning rivalry was a defensive struggle. The Broncos beat the Patriots 20–18 and advanced to Super Bowl 50.

=== 2016: Fifth Super Bowl Championship ===
Due to sanctions on the team stemming from Deflategate, Tom Brady didn't play in the first four games of the 2016 season. The Patriots used quarterback Jimmy Garoppolo, who helped the Patriots win their opening night game against the Arizona Cardinals. After a shoulder injury to Garoppolo in the second game of the season against the Miami Dolphins, rookie quarterback Jacoby Brissett entered the game and helped the Patriots win. On Thursday Night Football, Brissett helped the Patriots secure a 27–0 shutout victory against the Houston Texans. The Patriots lost their fourth game at home in a shutout to the Buffalo Bills. Brady returned the following week and helped the Patriots win four games. The Patriots closed the regular season winning seven straight games, along with their eighth consecutive division title and the #1 seed overall in the AFC.

In the playoffs, the Patriots hosted the Texans in the divisional round. The first half was tight, but the Patriots pulled away from Houston, winning 34–16. In the AFC Championship game, the Patriots beat the Pittsburgh Steelers 36–17 and advanced to the Super Bowl.

On February 5, 2017, the Patriots faced the Atlanta Falcons, which included NFL MVP Matt Ryan, in Super Bowl LI. Three bad quarters resulted in the Patriots being down 28–3. The Patriots made a comeback with Tom Brady going 43-for-62 with 466 yards, two touchdowns and one interception to help the Patriots tie the score 28–28 in the closing minutes of the game. In the first overtime in Super Bowl history, the Patriots won the coin toss and elected to receive the ball. Brady led the Patriots down the field, to the 1-yard line of the Falcons. Running back James White ran a toss into the end zone, giving the Patriots a 34–28 comeback victory and their second league title in three seasons. Brady was named Super Bowl MVP for a record fourth time and surpassed Joe Montana and Terry Bradshaw with his fifth Super Bowl victory as a quarterback, the most all-time.

=== 2017: Fifth Super Bowl loss ===
The Patriots lost several players during the offseason, including halfback LeGarrette Blount and cornerback Logan Ryan. To fill these vacancies, the Patriots signed cornerback Stephon Gilmore and running backs Mike Gillislee and Rex Burkhead. They also traded a second round draft pick to the Carolina Panthers for defensive end Kony Ealy.

During their first game versus the Kansas City Chiefs, the Chiefs beat them at home 42–27. During the game, the Patriots' defense allowed 537 total yards. The Patriots then beat the Saints and Texans. After their loss at home to the Carolina Panthers, the Patriots went 11–1 for the rest of the season, finishing 13–3. In Week 15 at Pittsburgh, the Patriots came back in the fourth quarter to take the lead, 27–24. On the ensuing drive by the Steelers, a short pass from Ben Roethlisberger to wide receiver JuJu Smith-Schuster turned into a gain, leading the Steelers to the 10-yard line with 34 seconds left. On Roethelisberger's next throw, tight end Jesse James caught a potential game-winning touchdown, but it was overturned after a review where officials ruled that James lost control as the ball hit the ground. The Patriots won 27–24, winning another AFC East title and #1 seed.

After beating the Tennessee Titans in the divisional round, the Patriots faced the Jacksonville Jaguars. In the fourth quarter, Brady led the team back from a ten-point deficit to take the lead, 24–20. The Patriots won and earned a trip to their eighth Super Bowl. In Super Bowl LII, Brady set a Super Bowl record with 505 yards passing. Brady tried to lead a comeback to win the game in the fourth quarter, but defensive end Brandon Graham strip-sacked Brady, and the ball was recovered by the Eagles. This, along with a failed last-second Hail Mary pass, resulted in the Patriots losing 41–33.

=== 2018: Sixth Super Bowl Championship ===
During the offseason, the Patriots lost left tackle Nate Solder, right tackle Cameron Fleming, wide receiver Brandin Cooks, starting running back Dion Lewis, and cornerback Malcolm Butler. Also during the offseason, they added left tackle Trent Brown, Bengals running back Jeremy Hill, and wide receiver Cordarrelle Patterson. The Patriots also drafted left tackle Isaiah Wynn and running back Sony Michel in the first round.

In September, the Patriots signed Josh Gordon. During the Patriots week 5 game against the Indianapolis Colts Brady became the third Quarterback to throw 500 touchdowns in his career. The Patriots had a six-game winning streak until losing at the Tennessee Titans in Week 10. In weeks 14 and 15, the team had back-to-back losses against the Dolphins and Steelers, both on the road. In late December, the Patriots lost Gordon, who left for health reasons. They finished the season with an 11–5 record and a first-round bye.

The Patriots beat the Los Angeles Chargers in the divisional round, routing them 41–28, with rookie Sony Michel scoring 3 times on rushing touchdowns. In the AFC Championship, they faced the Chiefs on the road. The Patriots had a 14–0 lead at halftime. Mahomes was able to rally back the Chiefs to a 21–17 lead in the 4th. The score went back and forth until the Chiefs kicked a field goal, sending the game to overtime at 31–31. The Patriots won the coin toss and Brady drove the Patriots down the field to score a Rex Burkhead rushing touchdown resulting in a 37–31 victory.

In Super Bowl LIII in Atlanta, the Patriots faced off against the Los Angeles Rams. The game remained tied 3–3 until the 4th quarter, when Brady and Gronkowski completed two long passes to put the Patriots inside the Rams 5 yard line, where Sony Michel would score the game's only touchdown, winning the game 13–3. Wide receiver Julian Edelman was named Super Bowl MVP, with 10 catches for 141 yards. The sixth Super Bowl victory tied the Patriots with the Steelers for most all time.

=== 2019: The end of an era ===
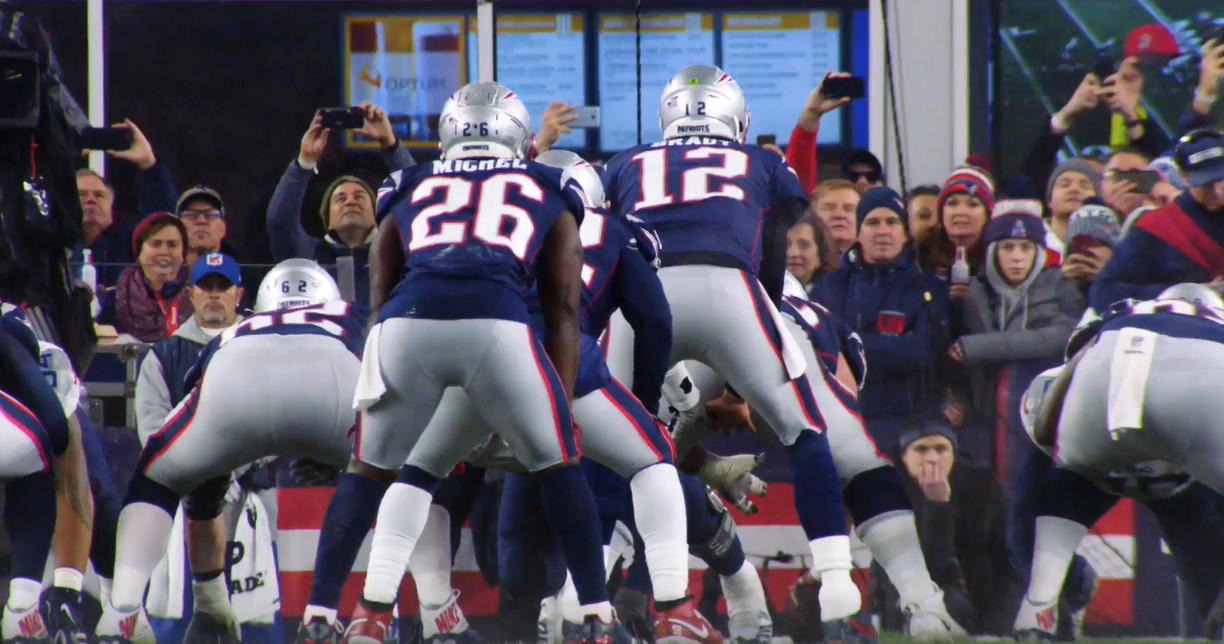
Brady and running back Sony Michel during the 2019 Wild Card game against Tennessee. This would become Brady's final game in a Patriots uniform.

Prior to the season, Tom Brady signed a two-year extension worth $70 million, but also allowed him to become a free agent after the 2019 season. On September 9, 2019, the Patriots signed Pro Bowl wide receiver Antonio Brown, whom was released by the Oakland Raiders following several off-the-field controversies, and a signing which some compared to the Randy Moss trade in 2007. Brown would last only one game with New England, getting released on September 22, 2019 due to more off-the-field issues. New England started the season with an 8–0 record. The streak ended with a loss to the Baltimore Ravens. The team won its 11th consecutive AFC East division title after a 24–17 win against the Buffalo Bills in Week 16, but New England didn't get a first-round bye for the playoffs.

The Patriots were the #3 seed in the AFC playoffs, but lost to the Titans at home during the wild card round 20–13. This was Brady's last game with the Patriots. On March 17, 2020, Brady announced that he would not re-sign with the Patriots. On March 20, 2020, Brady signed a two-year, $50-million deal with the Tampa Bay Buccaneers. On April 21, 2020, the Patriots traded the rights to retired tight end Rob Gronkowski to the Buccaneers along with a seventh-round pick in exchange for a fourth-round pick in the 2020 NFL draft.

== 2020–2023: Post-Brady struggles, Belichick's final seasons ==
=== 2020: Cam Newton and COVID ===
Prior to the season, the Patriots announced a uniform change, opting to go with their former NFL Color Rush jerseys as their new home uniforms with a corresponding white uniform with blue pants as their road outfits. Both uniforms featured truncated shoulder striping as a nod to the "Pat Patriot" uniforms. Former Carolina Panthers quarterback, 2011 NFL draft first overall pick, and 2015 NFL season MVP Cam Newton was announced as New England's new starting quarterback prior to the season. In addition, several veteran players such as Patrick Chung, Brandon Bolden, Marcus Cannon, and Dont'a Hightower opted out of the season due to the COVID-19 pandemic. Later in the Season, 3 other major players as Gunner, Burkhead, & Edelman, were injured who were instrumental in winning earlier, games.

After the Buffalo Bills beat the Pittsburgh Steelers in week 14, the Patriots were out of contention for the AFC East championship. They were also eliminated from playoff contention with the loss to the Dolphins in week 15. This was only the 4th time since 2000 the Patriots had missed the playoffs and failed to win the division. Cam Newton and Brian Hoyer ended their Season going 7–9. In addition, their streak of 10+ win seasons that dated back to their 2003 Super Bowl-winning season, which was an NFL record, was also snapped.

=== 2021: Mild success with Mac Jones ===
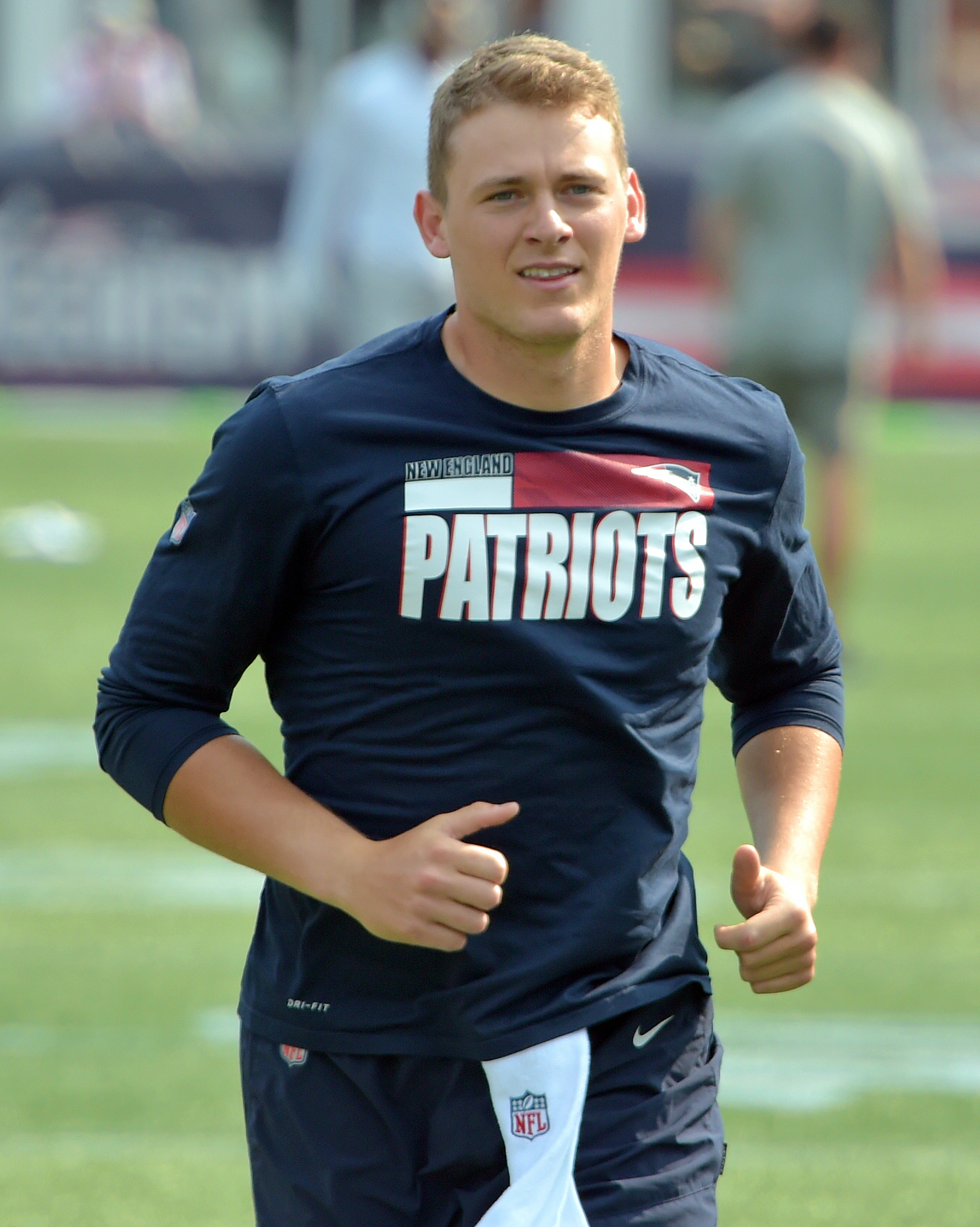
Quarterback Mac Jones was selected in the first round of the 2021 draft. Despite a successful rookie year, he struggled in the next two seasons before being traded.

The 2021 season started with the Patriots signing eleven free agents from other teams on the same day, including Hunter Henry, Nelson Agholor, Jonnu Smith, and Matthew Judon.

On August 31, 2021, the Patriots released Newton during final preseason roster cuts. As a result, rookie Mac Jones became the starting quarterback for the team. The Patriots started the season 2–4, but went on to win seven consecutive games, battling Buffalo for the division crown throughout the season. New England finished the season 10–7 in the first NFL season with 17 games, clinching the #6 seed in the playoffs, their first without Brady since 1998. They would lose to the Bills 47–17 in the wild-card round, their worst playoff loss under Belichick. Despite the playoff loss, Jones broke several rookie quarterback records for the team.

=== 2022–2023: Regression ===
Following a mildly successful 2021 season, Jones and the Patriots failed to repeat their success in the following two years. The Patriots wound up missing the playoffs in 2022 due to several close losses, including a walk-off loss to the Las Vegas Raiders due to a failed lateral pass play now known as the Lunatic Lateral. In 2023, Jones struggled noticeably and was replaced by Bailey Zappe by the end of the year, while the Patriots as a whole stumbled to a 4–13 record, their worst under Belichick. Shortly after the final game of 2023, Belichick and the Patriots mutually parted ways on January 11, 2024, after a series of poor decisions in his final years as general manager regarding offensive personnel, which culminated in a sharp decline of offensive production following the 2021 season.

== 2024–present: Jerod Mayo, Drake Maye and Mike Vrabel ==
=== 2024 ===
One day after Belichick stepped down, the Patriots promoted the pair of Jerod Mayo, then-current linebackers coach and former player, and Eliot Wolf, director of scouting and son of Pro Football Hall of Fame general manager Ron Wolf, as first-time head coach and first-time de facto general manager to each succeed Belichick's duties. Belichick and Kraft had designated Mayo as head coach in waiting before the season, intending for Mayo to succeed him upon Belichick's retirement in 2024. However, the Patriots' disastrous 2023 season led Kraft to have Mayo take over a year early.

Mac Jones, after three seasons as the incumbent starter, was traded in the 2024 offseason due to his insufficient play. The post-Belichick era was kickstarted during the 2024 NFL draft, with the franchise selecting Drake Maye third overall, the highest draft pick held by the Patriots in 31 years up to that point. On the day of the final game of the 2024 season, the Patriots fired Jerod Mayo after repeating the prior year's 4–13 record in his debut campaign as a head coach, due to multiple factors, including limited experience, which was eventually described by Robert Kraft as being put in an "untenable situation".

=== 2025: Sixth Super Bowl loss ===
The 2025 Patriots offseason which saw a major overhaul of the team's coaching staff which saw 14 new coaches including former Titans coach Mike Vrabel being hired as head coach, Josh McDaniels returning as offensive coordinator for a third stint with the team, and Lions defensive line coach/run game coordinator Terrell Williams being installed as defensive coordinator (though during the season Inside linebackers coach Zak Kuhr would call defensive plays due to Williams undergoing treatment for prostate cancer), and a number of assistant coaching changes. During the first 8 weeks of the 2025 season, the Patriots had a 6–2 start, which is their best since 2019. The Patriots finished the season with a 14–3 record, winning the AFC East for the first time since the 2019 season, and earning the AFC's #2 seed. In the NFL playoffs, the Patriots defeated the Los Angeles Chargers, the Houston Texans, and the Denver Broncos to reach Super Bowl LX. There, the Patriots lost to the Seattle Seahawks in a rematch of Super Bowl XLIX. Thus, the Patriots became the first team to lose six Super Bowls.
