= 1963 Little All-America college football team =

American college football all-star team

The 1963 Little All-America college football team is composed of college football players from small colleges and universities who were selected by the Associated Press (AP) as the best players at each position. For 1963, the AP selected three teams of 11 players each, with no separate defensive platoons.

Quarterback George Bork of Northern Illinois was the only repeater from 1962. Bork set 14 national passing records during his time at Northern Illinois, including single-season records of 3,077 passing yards, 374 completions, 32 touchdowns, and 341.9 passing yards per game. He was later inducted into the College Football Hall of Fame.

End Robert Cherry of Wittenberg had 45 receptions for 886 yards and 13 touchdowns. Back Mike Brown of Delaware averaged 104.8 rushing yards per game and averaged 6.3 yards per carry.

== First team ==
Position	Player	Team
B	George Bork	Northern Illinois
B	Mike Brown	Delaware
B	Sid Blanks	Texas A&I
B	Martin Agnew	Sewanee
E	Robert Cherry	Wittenberg
E	Jerry Cole	Southwest Texas State
T	Paul Graham	UMass
T	Neil Reuter	North Dakota
G	Ralph Bauman	Puget Sound
G	Greg Van Orden	Appalachian State
C	Richard Dean	DePauw

== Second team ==
Position	Player	Team
B	Jimmy Baker	East Tennessee State
B	Mickey Hergert	Lewis & Clark
B	Wayne Rasmussen	South Dakota State
B	Jerry Wonders	Luther
E	Neal Petties	San Diego State
E	John Mutchler	Western Kentucky
T	Jack Peters	Omaha
T	John McDowell	St. John's (MN)
G	William Crowell	Juniata
G	Bob Griffin	San Francisco State
C	Orville Hudson	East Texas

== Third-team ==
Position	Player	Team
B	Jack Ankerson	Ripon (WI)
B	Jim Switzer	College of Emporia
B	Jim Holder	Panhandle A&M
B	Charles Reed	Whitworth
E	Jim Hollingsworth	Portland
E	Wayne Howell	Missouri Valley
T	Dale Weishahn	UC Davis
T	Joe Davis	Northeastern
G	Wayne Farmer	Chattanooga
G	Lee Grimm	Butler
C	Frank Galloway	East Carolina

== See also ==
- 1963 College Football All-America Team
