= M. C. Leist =

American politician (1942–2022)

Marvin Clyde Leist Jr. (October 17, 1942 – February 13, 2022) was an American politician.

Leist was born in Liberal, Kansas and graduated from Lookeba Sickles High School in Lookeba, Oklahoma. He graduated from Oklahoma Panhandle State University. He taught high school and raised cattle. He lived in Morris, Oklahoma, with his wife and family. He served in the Oklahoma House of Representatives from 1987 to 2007 and was a Democrat. Leist died at the Muskogee Creek Nation Center in Okmulgee, Oklahoma, on February 13, 2022, at the age of 79.
