= Oklahoma Panhandle State University =

Public university in Goodwell, Oklahoma, U.S.

- Former names: Pan-Handle Agricultural Institute (1909–1921); Panhandle Agricultural and Mechanical College (1921–1967); Oklahoma Panhandle State College of Agriculture and Applied Science (1967–1974)
- Motto: Progress Through Knowledge
- Type: Public university
- Established: 1909
- Parent institution: Oklahoma Agricultural and Mechanical Colleges
- Accreditation: HLC
- President: Julie Dinger
- Students: 1,720
- Location: Goodwell, Oklahoma, U.S. 36°35′35″N 101°38′14″W
- Colors: Crimson & Blue
- Nickname: Aggies
- Sporting affiliations: NAIA – Sooner
- Website: opsu.edu
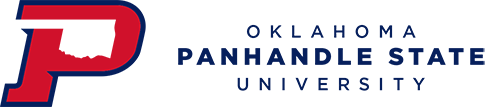

Oklahoma Panhandle State University (OPSU, informally Panhandle State or simply Panhandle) is a public college in Goodwell, Oklahoma, United States. OPSU is a baccalaureate degree-granting institution. General governance of the institution is provided by the Board of Regents of the Oklahoma Agricultural and Mechanical Colleges. Academic programs and financial support are authorized and coordinated through the Oklahoma State Regents for Higher Education.

== History ==
In 1908, the Oklahoma Legislature passed legislation stating that, "...each of the Supreme Court judicial districts [shall have] a district agricultural school of secondary grade for instruction in agriculture and mechanics and allied branches, and domestic science, and economics, with courses of instruction leading to the Agricultural and Mechanical College, and the state normal schools".

Oklahoma Panhandle State University was created in response to this act. The campus opened in 1909 as Pan-Handle Agricultural Institute, (PAI) and offered secondary agricultural education for the Panhandle area. PAI began offering courses to prepare public school teachers in 1915. In 1921, the legislature authorized the school to offer a two-year college curriculum, and the name was changed to Panhandle Agricultural and Mechanical College (PAMC). The college began offering four-year degree programs in 1925. In 1967, the school was designated as Oklahoma Panhandle State College of Agriculture and Applied Science. In 1974, the university assumed its present name.

Franklin Hall, the school's oldest building, is listed on the U.S. National Register of Historic Places.

== Academics ==
Undergraduate demographics as of Fall 2023
Race and ethnicity	Total
White	49%
Hispanic	22%
Black	13%
American Indian/Alaska Native	6%
International student	6%
Two or more races	3%
Asian	1%
Unknown	1%
Economic diversity
Low-income (Note: The percentage of students who received an income-based federal Pell grant intended for low-income students.)	47%
Affluent (Note: The percentage of students who are a part of the American middle class at the bare minimum.)	53%

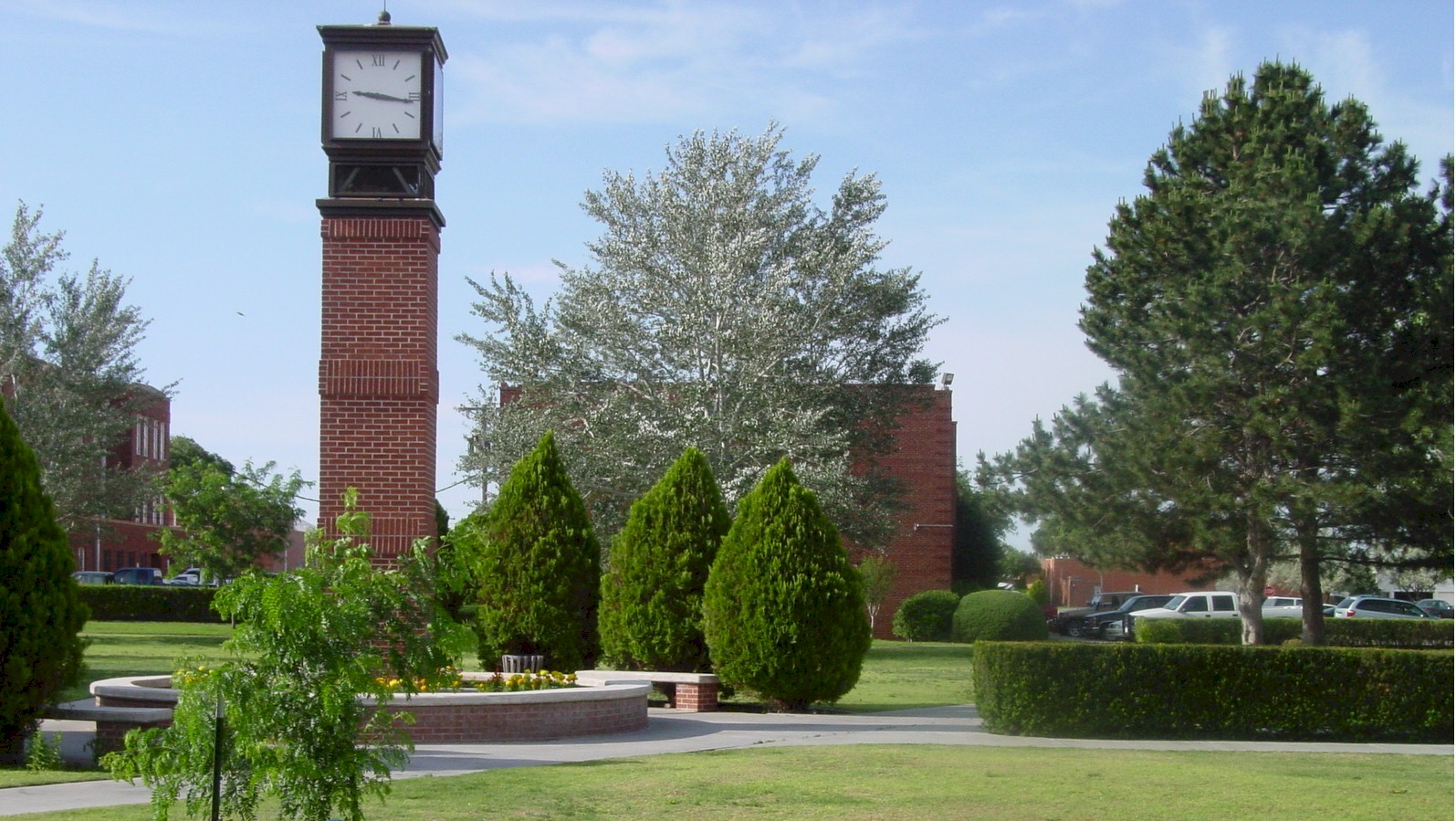
Primary quad and clock tower at OPSU

The university is organized into three colleges that offer associate degrees and bachelor's degrees in such areas as history, education, business, and nursing. OPSU's agriculture-related degree programs seek to produce graduates who are qualified to work in the region's many bovine, equine, swine, and farming-related industries.

OPSU is regionally accredited by the Commission on Institutions of Higher Education of the North Central Association of Colleges and Schools to grant associate and bachelor's degrees. It is also approved by the Oklahoma State Board of Education for the preparation of elementary and secondary teachers, The National Council for Accreditation of Teacher Education (NCATE), and by the Accreditation Commission for Education in Nursing Inc.(ACEN).

The constituent colleges are:

- College of Agriculture, Science, and Nursing
- College of Business and Technology
- College of Arts and Education

There are nationally competitive teams in Computer Programming (OPSU AITP), Business (OPSU PBL), Crops Judging, and Livestock Judging.

== Athletics ==
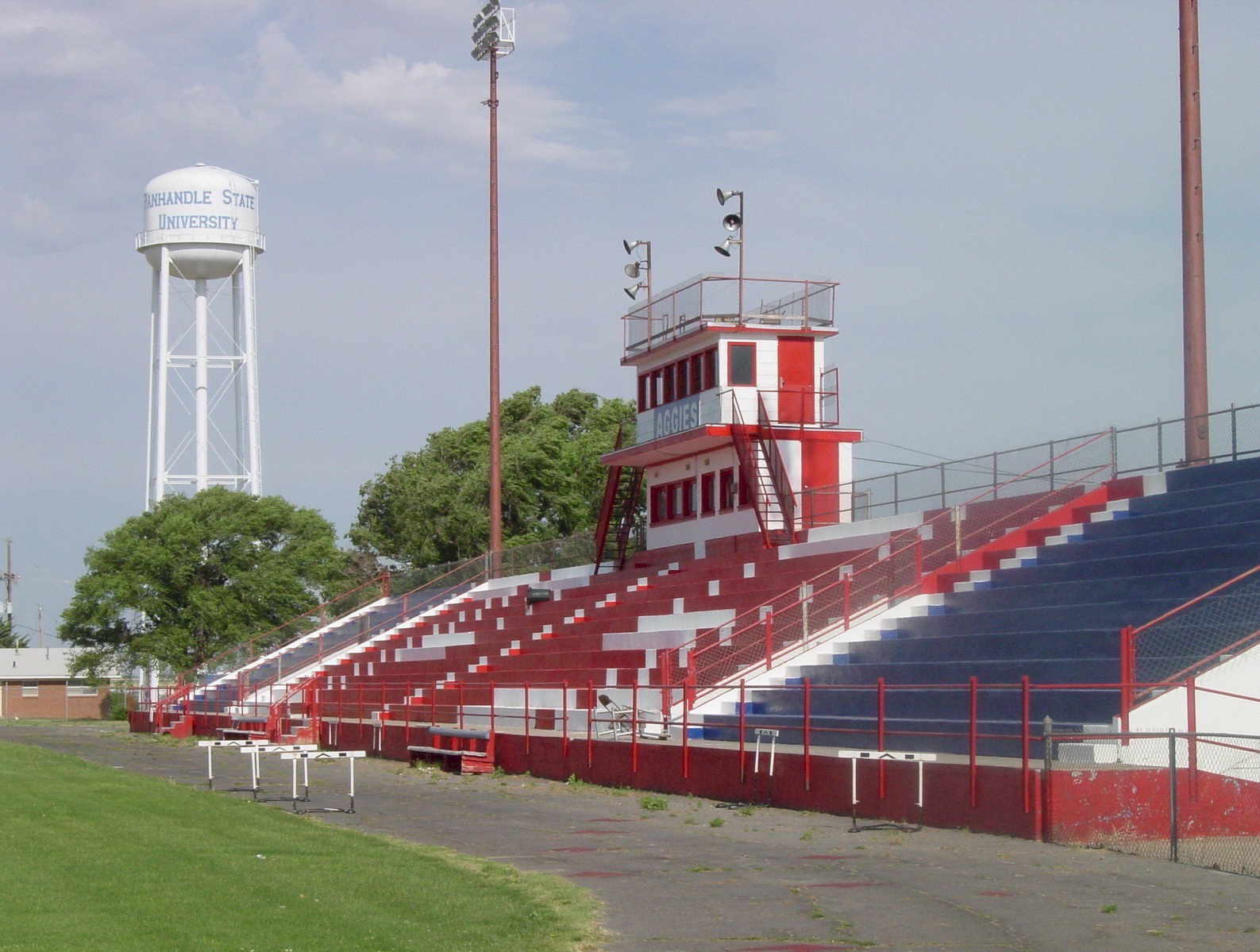
Carl Wooten Field

The Oklahoma Panhandle State (OPSU) athletic teams are called the Aggies. The university is a member of the National Association of Intercollegiate Athletics (NAIA), primarily competing in the Sooner Athletic Conference (SAC) for most of its sports since the 2017–18 academic year. The Aggies previously competed in the Heartland Conference of the NCAA Division II ranks from 2002–03 to 2016–17.

OPSU competes in 18 intercollegiate varsity sports. Men's sports include baseball, basketball, cross country, football, golf, soccer and track & field; while women's sports include basketball, cheerleading, cross country, golf, soccer, softball, track & field and volleyball; and co-ed sports include equestrian, rodeo and shooting sports.

=== Football ===
The football team plays at Carl Wooten Field and at one point competed in the Central States Football League (CSFL) until after the 2017 fall season. Previously, the Aggies competed in the NCAA Division II Lone Star Conference during the 2016 fall season. In the early nineties, OPSU Aggies football was known as a football powerhouse in the NAIA. The program has recently had some success thanks to the late Mike Wyatt (2007–2010). The 2010 team produced the Aggie football program's first winning season since 2004, going 6–5. The current coach, Russell Gaskamp, has set new records in player involvement in community service activities.

=== Rodeo ===
A point of pride for OPSU is its men's and women's rodeo teams. The school is a member of the Central Plains Region of the National Intercollegiate Rodeo Association (NIRA) and has won several regional and national team championships as well as numerous individual championships in the sport. The OPSU men's rodeo team won national titles in 1997, 1998, 2000, 2004. 2013, 2017, and 2018. As part of their scholarship package, rodeo team members may receive lodging in special housing and stalls for their animals.

== Notable alumni ==
- Frank Beede, a former offensive lineman for the Seattle Seahawks. Beede played offensive line for the OPSU football team from 1995 to 1996.
- Jim Holder, an All American running back from Wichita Falls. Holder set NAIA rushing records in 1963 and is the only Aggie inductee of the College Football Hall of Fame.
- Joshua Johnson, a world champion sprinter.
- Wright Langham, a biochemist and internationally renowned expert in numerous fields, especially plutonium.
- Jon Lantz, a former college football coach.
- M. C. Leist, a former Democratic member of the Oklahoma House of Representatives.
- Casey Murdock, a Republican member of the Oklahoma House of Representatives, representing the 27th district since 2018.
- Seton Sobolewski, college basketball coach at Idaho State
- Leo Winters, a former Oklahoma State Treasurer and Lieutenant Governor.
