= New Hampshire Northcoast Corporation =

New Hampshire Northcoast

Overview
- Headquarters: Ossipee, New Hampshire
- Reporting mark: NHN
- Locale: Massachusetts, New Hampshire
- Dates of operation: 1986–present

Technical
- Track gauge: 4 ft 8 1/2 in (1,435 mm) standard gauge

Other
- Website: www.nhnorthcoast.com

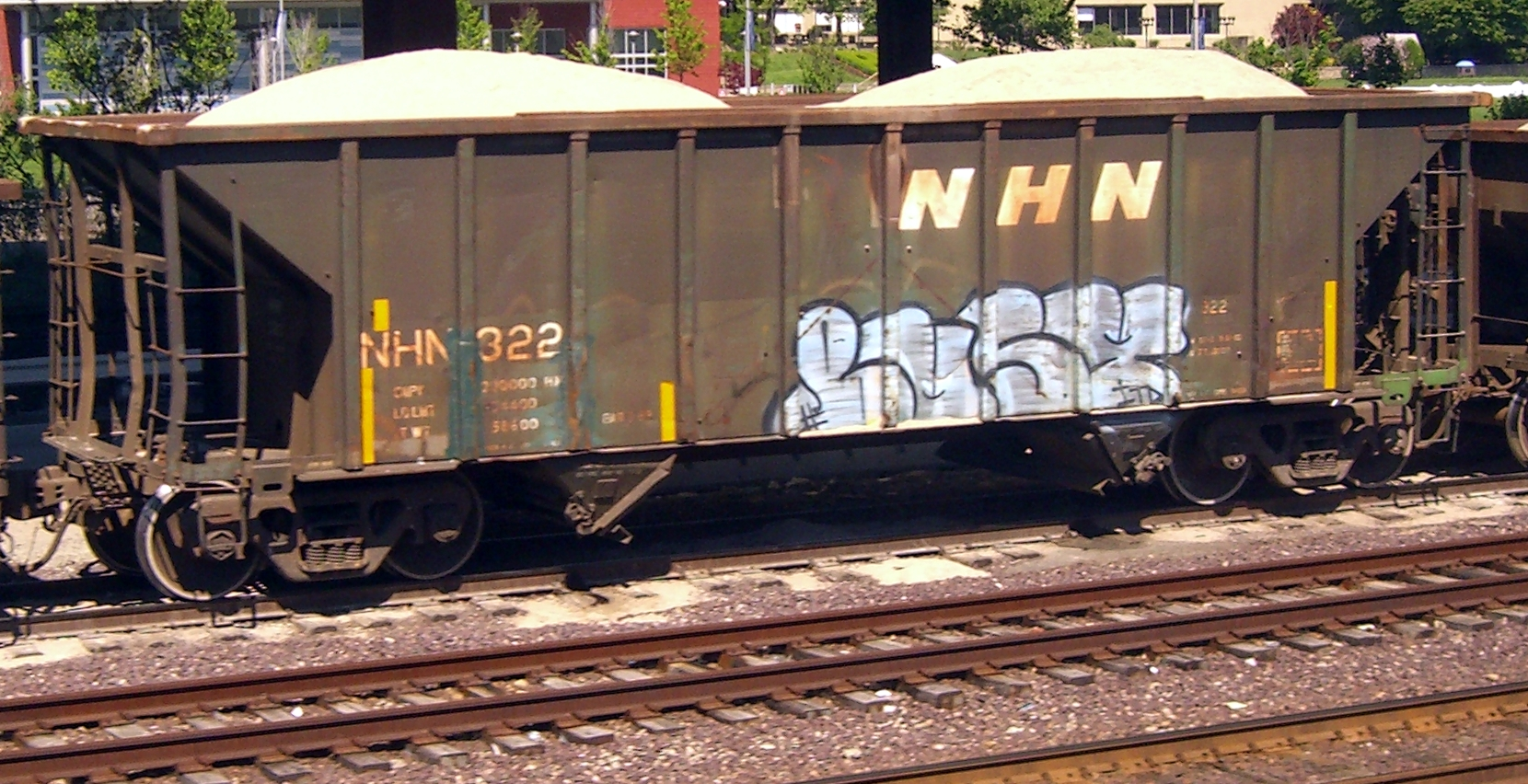
NHN hopper car

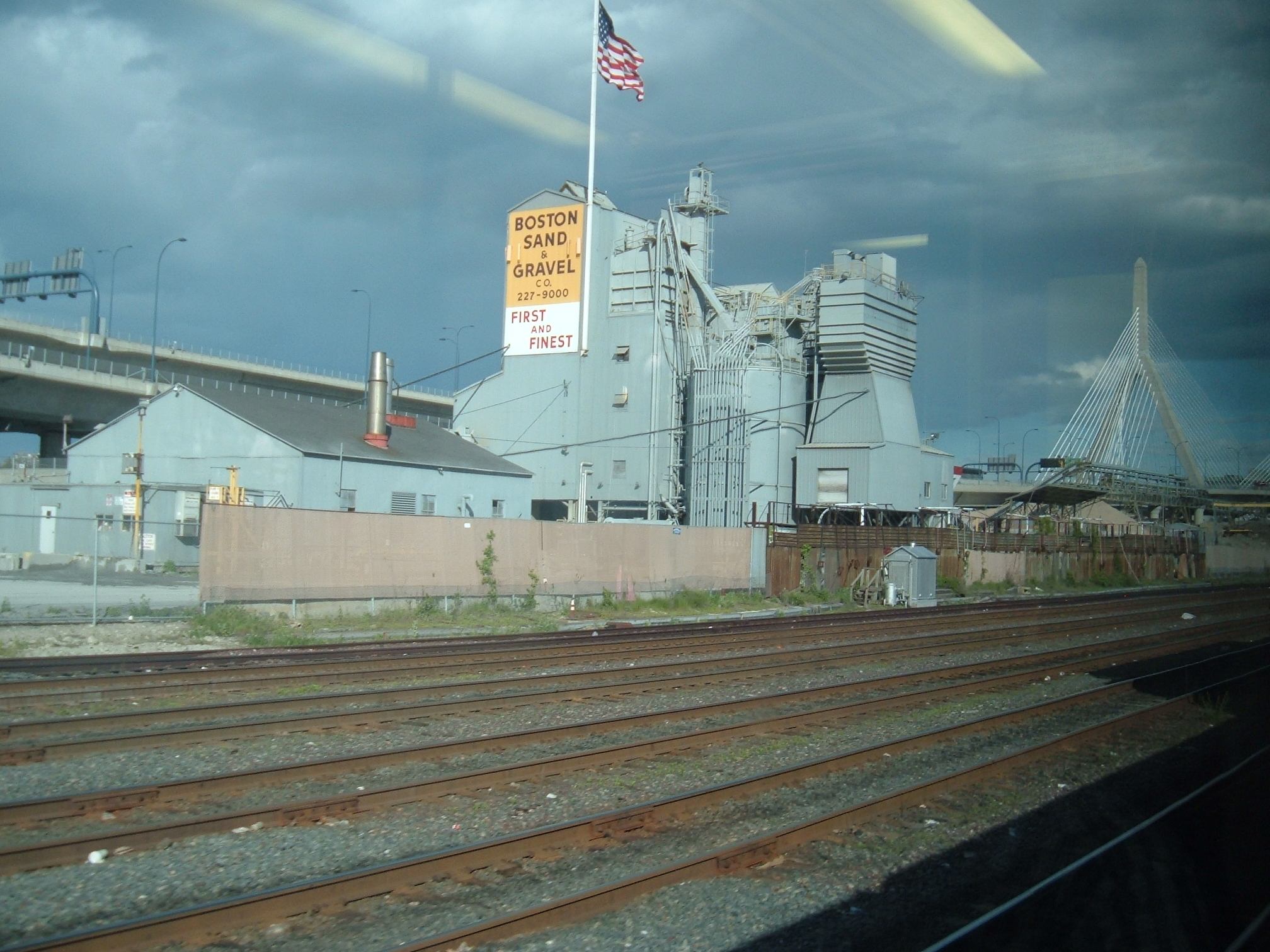
Boston Sand and Gravel plant, final destination of most of NHN's traffic

The New Hampshire Northcoast Corporation (reporting mark NHN) is a Class III railroad owned by Boston Sand & Gravel and offering freight service in parts of New Hampshire and Massachusetts in the United States. The company owns 43 miles (69 km) of the former Boston and Maine Corporation's Conway Branch between Rollinsford and Ossipee, New Hampshire. The railroad's primary traffic is quarried sand. It interchanges cars with CSX in Dover, New Hampshire; the cars are then taken to the Boston Sand & Gravel plant in Charlestown, Massachusetts.

Other than the Boston gravel train, NHN also serves its own satellite gravel facility in Rochester, New Hampshire, as well as Eastern Propane at the same location and a few other freight customers. The company was founded in 1986 when the abandoned tracks were purchased. It has been proposed that the tracks be upgraded for passenger service between Boston and North Conway, New Hampshire.

NHN runs an average of two trains approximately five days a week: one southbound, and one northbound. The trains generally arrive at the pit in Ossipee around 11:00 AM and depart for the CSX interchange around 2:00 PM. "Shuttle" trains are run as needed to bring sand and gravel to the facility in Rochester. Once the train arrives in Dover, it assumes the CSX symbol DOBO (Dover to Boston) for the run to Boston. It returns as BODO (Boston to Dover) in the early morning. Until recently when they were replaced with a pair of EMD GP38-2s, the trains ran with several EMD GP9s.

== Roster ==
Number	Builder	Type	Build date	Notes
1801	EMD	GP18	1960	Oldest unit on the roster, acquired from the New England Southern Railroad as NEGS 503, before being repainted. Today, this locomotive sees limited use, typically on local ID2/DI1 to Rochester, New Hampshire. This loco sports a Nathan K5H horn
1802	EMD	GP18	Mar 1960	Ex-MBTA 904, Ex-SEMTA 904, Ex-GTW 4952 (Class GRG-18b) Serial #25742, FN 5613-3. Acquired by MBTA February 10, 1987.
3823	EMD	GP38	1978	Ex-Conrail 8242, acquired from Helm Leasing(HLCX) in the mid 2000s. This unit wears a Leslie RS5T horn.
3825	EMD	EMD GP38	1978	Also an Ex-Conrail unit(numbered 8244), then went to HLCX leasing before ending up on New Hampshire Northcoast. This unit wears a Nathan K5LA horn.

The railroad also has an FURX GP38-2(5509) on lease and is not owned by the NHN.

== Sources ==
- New Hampshire Railroad Revitalization Association. "Preserving the Railroad System - An overview of New Hampshire's Activity: 1975 - 2000". nhrra.org. Archived from the original on August 13, 2007.
