= Wright Haskell Langham =

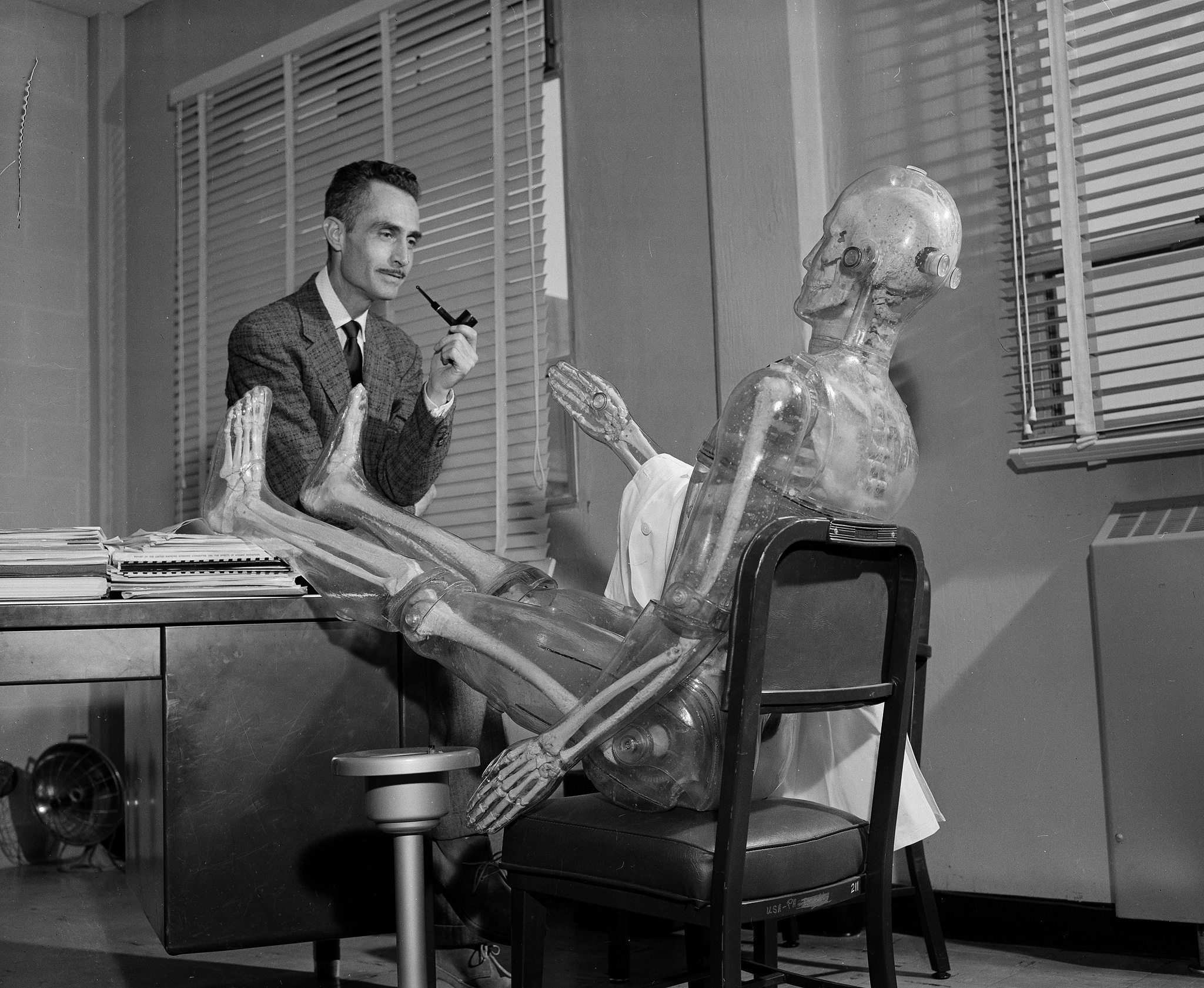
Wright Haskell Langham with Plastic Man

Wright Haskell Langham (21 May 1911 – 19 May 1972) was an internationally renowned expert in the fields of plutonium exposure, aerospace medicine and aviation medicine, Eniwetok nuclear tests, the Palomares and Greenland nuclear accidents. Sometimes Langham was referred to as Mr. Plutonium.

== Life and times ==
Wright Haskell Langham was born in Winnsboro, Texas on 21 May 1911. Langham attended Texhoma High School in Texhoma, Oklahoma and graduated in 1930 and earned a Bachelor of Science in Chemistry from Oklahoma Panhandle State College in 1934. Langham was awarded a Master of Science in Chemistry from Oklahoma A & M College in 1935. Next he attended Iowa State University and pursued studies in organic chemistry. Langham completed the Ph.D. in Biochemistry from the University of Colorado Boulder in 1943.

== Radiation tests on human subjects ==
Dr. Langham wrote and oversaw experiments intended to gauge the effects of exposure to radioactive elements on humans. The experiments involved injecting subjects with radioactive isotopes of polonium, plutonium or uranium without the informed consent of the subject. Dr. Langham suggested in public papers after the experiments that the patients had been terminally ill.

== Death ==
On 19 May 1972, Langham died in a plane crash. A twin-engine aircraft chartered by the Los Alamos Scientific Laboratories crashed on takeoff from Albuquerque International Airport, killing all nine persons aboard, including Langham, a leading biomedical scientist. Witnesses said the Beechcraft Queen Air, chartered to shuttle Los Alamos personnel between Albuquerque and Los Alamos, apparently lost power in one engine and nosedived into an open field south of the control tower. Authorities reported that all 8 passengers and the pilot were killed when the plane crashed.

The victims included Dr. Langham, who was then associate division leader for biomedical research at Los Alamos. He had been working at the laboratory since 1944, and was a leading plutonium scientist. The other casualties were technicians or staff members, and were Eugene Teatum, 37; Donald A. Larson, 46; Bruce A. Bean, 28; Johnnie E. Gallegos, 41; Richard O. Neithammer, 39; William Paul Frye, 40; and John Allen Gill, 43. The pilot was Richard T. Zittel of Ross Aviation. All the victims were from Los Alamos, except for Gill who was from Arroyo Seco, New Mexico.

The plane was on a routine flight from Albuquerque to Los Alamos, lost an engine during takeoff, and crashed into the runway. The crash occurred shortly after midday at 1:37 p.m. Aviation officials remarked that high winds (up to 31 knots) might have contributed to the crash.

Documents Concerning Thule Accident

== Career highlights ==
- Oklahoma Panhandle A & M College, Agricultural Experiment Station, Research Chemist, 1935-1937, 1939-1941
- University of Chicago, Metallurgical Laboratory, Research Chemist, 1943-1944
- Los Alamos Scientific Laboratory, Biomedical Research Division, Chemist, Group Leader, Associate Division Leader, 1944-1972
- University of California at Los Angeles, Associate Professor, 1944-1972

== Professional service ==
- Tripartite Permissible Doses Conference, 1949
- University of Utah, Radiobiology Project, Founding Fathers Group
- NAS-NRC, Committee on Pathologic Effects of Atomic Radiation, Subcommittee on Toxicity of Internal Emitters, 1956-1960
- National Committee on Radiation Protection and Measurements, Relative Biological Effectiveness, Sub-Committee M-4, Chairman, 1957-1960
- United States Atomic Energy Commission and United States Department of Defense, Nevada Test Site, Pacific atolls, Rongelap, 1954-1955
- U.S. Air Force and U.S. State Department, Special Assignment: Palomares, Spain, 1966; Thule Air Base, Greenland, 1968
- U.S. Congress, Joint Committee on Atomic Energy, Testimonies at Hearings
- AEC, Nevada Applied Ecology Group, Ad Hoc Committee on Plutonium, Chairman, 1970-1972
- NAS-NRC, Space Science Board, Life Sciences Committee, Space Radiobiology Panel, Chairman, 1964-1966
- NAS-NRC, Space Science Board, Committee on Space Medicine, Radiobiology Advisory Panel, Chairman, 1967-1971

== Health Physics Society ==
- Board of Directors, Member, 1958-1961, 1968-1970
- President-Elect, 1967-1968
- President, Chairman of Board, 1968-1969
- Past-President, Awards Committee Chairman, 1969-1970

== Achievements and honors ==
- Eniwetok Atoll nuclear tests, 1951
- PUQFUA, Plutonium Body Burden (Q) from Urine Analysis – software program
  PUQFUA is a computer program written in the FORTRAN language.
- Palomares B-52 crash in Spain, 1966.
- Thule Air Base B-52 crash, 1968
- Working Group on Human Factors and Training of the Special Committee on Space Technology, NASA, 1958
- Special Committee on Life Sciences, NASA, 1958-1960
- Committee on Space Medicine, NASA, Chairman
- Atomic Energy Commission
- Department of Defense, Distinguished Service Award, 1967
- Panhandle State College, Alumni Ambassadors Hall of Fame, 1973
