= Boston Sand & Gravel =

Construction supply company

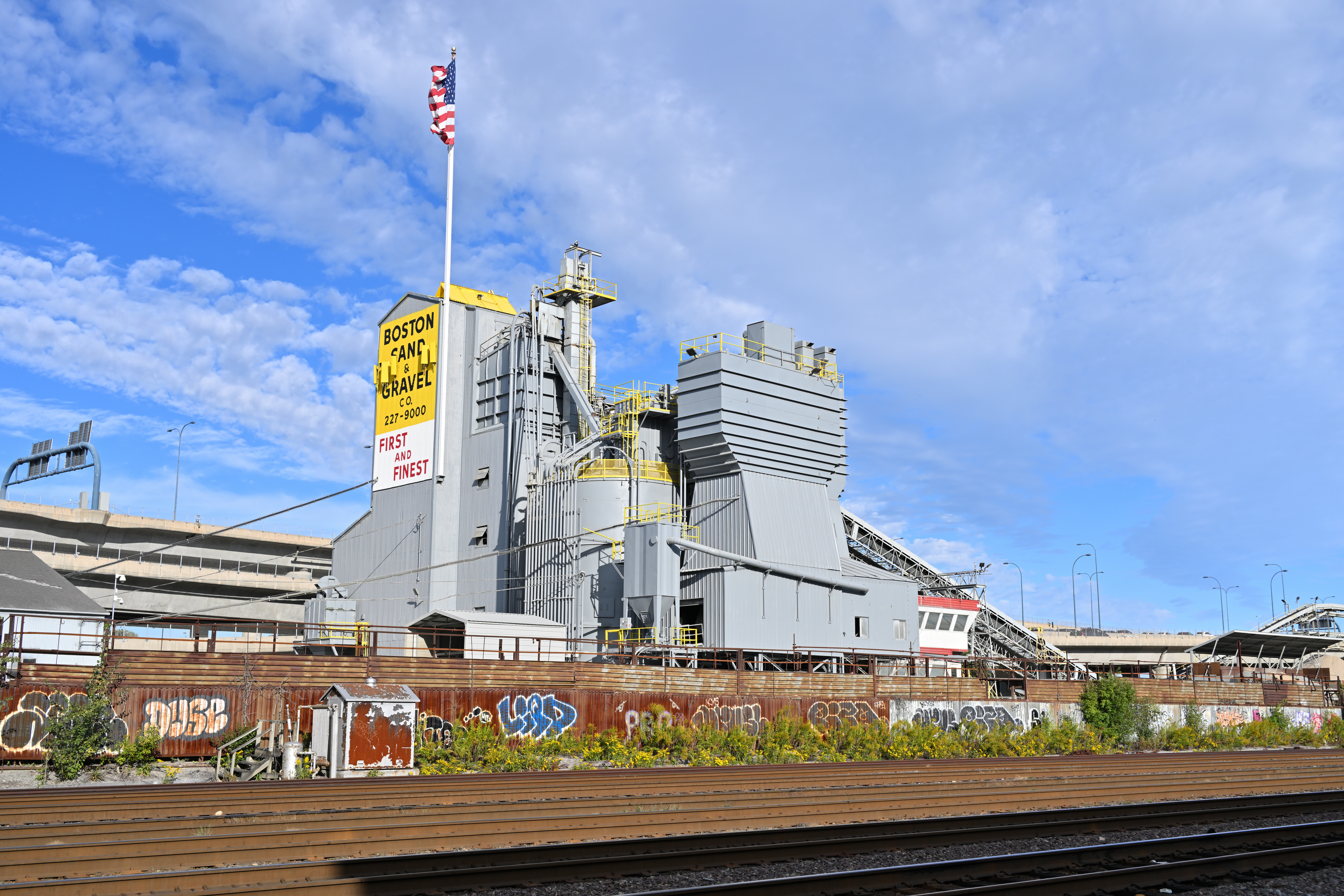
- The Boston Sand and Gravel plant in Charlestown
- Industry: Construction
- Founded: 1914 in Cambridge, Massachusetts, United States
- Products: Construction aggregate
- Website: www.bostonsand.com

Boston Sand and Gravel is a supplier of ready-to-pour concrete, concrete blocks, sand, and crushed stone, with operations and subsidiaries around eastern Massachusetts and New Hampshire in the United States.

The Charlestown, Massachusetts, plant is a highly visible landmark for commuters on the north side of Boston, because it is located between the Central Artery North (part of Interstate 93) and the MBTA Commuter Rail tracks just north of North Station. Its tower directly abuts the Leverett Connector, and the ramps connecting the Zakim Bridge with the Tobin Bridge completely surround the plant, which supplied concrete for the Big Dig project which constructed them.

The company was founded in 1914, and was originally located where the CambridgeSide Galleria is now. The spot was convenient to the Charles River because materials were originally sourced from dredging. Later, the company began obtaining raw material from quarries in Ossipee, New Hampshire, and Hooksett, New Hampshire.

Boston Sand and Gravel owns railroad track from Ossipee to Rollinsford, New Hampshire, through its railroad subsidiary, the New Hampshire Northcoast Corporation. The location of its plant along the government-owned tracks in Charlestown provides easy access for its gravel trains, through an agreement to use the freight trackage rights kept by CSX. It also owns a terminal in Everett, Massachusetts, for shipping of aggregate materials by ship, railroad, and truck.

As of 2016, the company's other subsidiaries are Manchester Sand and Gravel, Ossipee Aggregates, Rosenfeld Concrete, Southeastern Concrete, and Lawrence Ready Mix.
