= Jim Holder =

American football player (1940–1966)

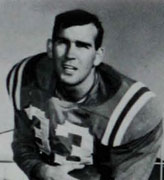
- Holder in Panhandle A&M football uniform

No. 33
- Position: Running back

Personal information
- Born: August 24, 1940; Wichita Falls, Texas, U.S.
- Died: September 25, 1966 (aged 26); South Vietnam
- Listed height: 5 ft 9 in (1.75 m)
- Listed weight: 175 lb (79 kg)

Career information
- High school: Wichita Falls
- College: Panhandle A&M (1958); Midwestern State (1959–1960); Panhandle A&M (1961–1963)

Awards and highlights
- Third-team Little All-American (1963); NAIA All America; College Football Hall of Fame inductee
- College Football Hall of Fame (Class of 2012)

James Edward Holder (August 24, 1940 – September 25, 1966) was an American football player who played running back at Panhandle A&M College—now Oklahoma Panhandle State University, setting the NAIA single season records for rushes and yards gained during his senior year. An ROTC member, Holder entered the United States Army after graduation and was killed while serving as an air cavalry officer during the Vietnam War. On July 21, 2012, Holder was inducted posthumously into the College Football Hall of Fame, the first from his school ever so enshrined.

== Career ==
Born in Wichita Falls, Texas in 1940, Holder attended school in his home town and moved to Goodwell, Oklahoma in 1958 to enter Panhandle A&M College. A three-sport performer, Holder played golf and football for the Aggies, while setting track and field records in the long jump and 100-yard dash. After his freshman year, Holder returned to Wichita Falls to attend Midwestern State University, then re-entered Panhandle State in 1961 to complete his college athletic career.

Holder's team lost one game in his sophomore year, and Holder was selected as All Oklahoma Collegiate Athletic Conference honorable mention. As a junior, Holder ran 77 times for the Aggies, gaining 565 yards, averaging 109.3 yards per game and was again an honorable mention All Conference. During his senior year in 1963, Holder broke school and NAIA records by rushing for 1775 yards on 275 carries in ten games. His NAIA rushing yards record would stand for over 20 years. In addition, Holder accounted for over two thirds of his team's total offense; he was selected All Conference and NAIA All American.

In 1964, Holder served his team as student assistant football coach, completed his degree in health and physical education, then became a commissioned officer in the Army. He briefly played semi-pro football while training at Fort Benning, and went to Vietnam with his unit, Delta Company, 1st Battalion, 5th Cavalry, 1st Cavalry Division (Airmobile). In September 1966, Holder lost his life in a helicopter crash.

== Legacy ==
Holder's name appears on Washington, D.C.'s Vietnam Veterans Memorial on panel 11E, line 15. His school retired his uniform number 33, the first ever retired by Panhandle State. In 2012 Holder was inducted the College Football Hall of Fame. He is the only player from Oklahoma Panhandle State University to be a member of the Hall.
