= U.S. Route 83 in Oklahoma =

Segment of American highway

U.S. Highway 83
- US 83 highlighted in red

Route information
- Maintained by ODOT

Major junctions
- South end: US 83 at Texas state line near Perryton, TX
- US 412 / SH-3 in Bryan's Corner; US 64 / US 270
- North end: US-83 / US-270 at Kansas state line near Liberal, KS

Location
- Country: United States
- State: Oklahoma
- Counties: Beaver

Highway system
- United States Numbered Highway System; List; Special; Divided; Oklahoma State Highway System; Interstate; US; State; Turnpikes
← SH-82	→ SH-83

U.S. Route 83 (US-83) is a part of the U.S. Highway System that runs from the Veterans International Bridge in Brownsville, Texas north to the Canadian border, north of Westhope, North Dakota, where it continues as Manitoba Highway 83. In the U.S. state of Oklahoma, US-83 is a main north–south highway that runs from the Texas border north to the Kansas border.

== Route description ==
US 83 traverses the Oklahoma panhandle along the western border of Beaver County, but in this brief 36.4-mile (58.6 km) stretch it encounters no fewer than three other U.S. Highways. Approximately 10 miles (16 km) from the Texas line, US 83 intersects US 412 in the hamlet of Bryan's Corner. Continuing its journey northward, the highway crosses the Beaver River, then intersects US 64 in Turpin. US 83 north and US 64 east run concurrently for three miles (4.8 km), where US 64 turns eastward. At this intersection, US 270 west joins the highway, and together with US 83 proceeds northbound for the final six miles (9.7 km) to the Kansas line.

== Major intersections ==
The entire route is in Beaver County.

Location	mi	km	Destinations	Notes
	0.000	0.000	US 83 south	Continuation into Texas
Bryan's Corner	8.9	14.3	US 412 / SH-3	
Turpin	26.6	42.8	US 64 west	Southern terminus of US 64 overlap
	32.6	52.5	US 64 east / US 270 east	Northern end of US 64 overlap; southern end of US 270 overlap
	36.4	58.6	US-83 north / US-270 west	Continuation into Kansas
1.000 mi = 1.609 km; 1.000 km = 0.621 mi: Concurrency terminus

U.S. Route 83
Previous state: Terminus	Texas	Next state: Kansas
