= National Register of Historic Places listings in Beaver County, Oklahoma =

Location of Beaver County in Oklahoma

This is a list of the National Register of Historic Places listings in Beaver County, Oklahoma.

This is intended to be a complete list of the properties on the National Register of Historic Places in Beaver County, Oklahoma, United States. The locations of National Register properties for which the latitude and longitude coordinates are included below, may be seen in a map.

There are 11 properties listed on the National Register in the county.

This National Park Service list is complete through NPS recent listings posted March 21, 2025.

== Current listings ==
	Name on the Register	Image	Date listed	Location	City or town	Description
1	Beaver County Courthouse	Beaver County Courthouse	August 23, 1984 (#84002964)	Off U.S. Route 270; 36°48′57″N 100°31′16″W	Beaver	Red brick 75 by 75 feet (23 m × 23 m) two-story courthouse built in 1926 around old 1907 courthouse
2	Floris Grain Elevator		October 7, 1983 (#83004159)	Off U.S. Route 64; 36°52′13″N 100°42′28″W	Floris	
3	Gate School	Gate School	September 10, 1999 (#99001087)	Junction of 4th and Texas; 36°51′18″N 100°03′23″W	Gate	
4	Knowles Grain Elevator	Knowles Grain Elevator	May 13, 1983 (#83002069)	U.S. Route 64; 36°52′28″N 100°11′30″W	Knowles	
5	Lane Cabin	Lane Cabin	June 5, 1974 (#74001654)	Main St. and Ave. C 36°49′05″N 100°31′08″W	Beaver	
6	Lonker Archeological Site		November 27, 1978 (#78002218)	Address Restricted	Gate	
7	Old Settler's Irrigation Ditch		July 27, 1983 (#83002070)	Intersects U.S. Route 283 north of Rosston; 36°56′55″N 99°57′47″W	Rosston	
8	Presbyterian Church	Presbyterian Church	May 16, 1974 (#74001655)	3rd St. and Ave. E 36°48′53″N 100°31′16″W	Beaver	
9	Billy Rose Archeological Site		September 1, 1978 (#78002219)	Address Restricted	Mocane	
10	Sharps Creek Crossing Site		April 4, 1975 (#75001559)	Address Restricted	Turpin	
11	Turpin Grain Elevator		May 13, 1983 (#83002071)	Off U.S. Route 64; 36°52′45″N 100°52′35″W	Turpin	

== See also ==
- List of National Historic Landmarks in Oklahoma
- National Register of Historic Places listings in Oklahoma
