= Baker, Oklahoma =

- Unincorporated community
- Location within the state of Oklahoma Baker, Oklahoma (the United States)
- Coordinates: 36°52′10″N 101°01′05″W
- Country: United States
- State: Oklahoma
- County: Texas

Area
  - Total: 1.00 sq mi (2.58 km^{2})
  - Land: 1.00 sq mi (2.58 km^{2})
  - Water: 0 sq mi (0.00 km^{2})
- Elevation: 2,848 ft (868 m)

Population (2020)
  - Total: 37
  - Density: 37.2/sq mi (14.37/km^{2})
- Time zone: UTC-6 (Central (CST))
  - Summer (DST): UTC-5 (CDT)
- ZIP codes: 73950
- FIPS code: 40-03900

Baker is an unincorporated community in northeastern Texas County, Oklahoma, United States, ¼ mile north of U.S. Route 64. Tyrone lies six miles to the north-northwest on U.S. Route 54 and Turpin lies eight miles to the east at the intersection of Route 64 and U.S. Route 83 in adjacent Beaver County.

As of the 2020 census, Baker had a population of 37.

== History ==
Founded between Hooker and Turpin Oklahoma, a child of the BM&E (Beaver. Meade and Englewood, Later MKT) railroad. Baker become a double railroad town in its infancy when the CRI&P (Chicago Rock Island and Pacific) crossed through just three years after being platted. Named after a Hooker, Oklahoma man, Reuben F. Baker whom sold the acreage for the town from his quarter section where baker lies, the town sprung to existence in the summer and fall of 1926. The town thrived in its early years and persevered through the dust bowl and Great Depression. Home to the remnants of the Eureka school (Eureka Polar Bears), Baker has but few residents left. However, two grain elevators still operate today, centered in wheat and corn country. One elevator, the Riffe-Gilmore elevator is one of few Riffe-Gilmore elevators still in operation, having been operated by the same family since its inception on the railroad in 1926. GW Riffe, an early settler of the area was one of the first to plant wheat in the new Oklahoma territory near Baker as what was once known as “no man’s land” became the Oklahoma Panhandle. The town briefly held the name of Bakerburg after opening a post office in 1931, as another Baker, Oklahoma held a post office in that name, after that town's post office closed, Bakerburg was once again Baker, officially renaming in 1953. The last Katy train left eastbound from Baker around January 4, 1973. Following bankruptcy of the Chicago Rock Island line in 1974, the last trains of the thriving Baker town left the transportation of the surrounding wheat fields to trucks on US Highway 64.

=== NRHP Sites ===
Both the Baker Woodframe Elevator and the separate Baker Woodframe Grain Elevator are NRHP-listed.

== Demographics ==
=== 2020 census ===
As of the 2020 census, Baker had a population of 37. The median age was 35.5 years. 13.5% of residents were under the age of 18 and 27.0% of residents were 65 years of age or older. For every 100 females there were 85.0 males, and for every 100 females age 18 and over there were 77.8 males age 18 and over.

0.0% of residents lived in urban areas, while 100.0% lived in rural areas.

There were 14 households in Baker, of which 21.4% had children under the age of 18 living in them. Of all households, 28.6% were married-couple households, 21.4% were households with a male householder and no spouse or partner present, and 50.0% were households with a female householder and no spouse or partner present. About 57.1% of all households were made up of individuals and 7.1% had someone living alone who was 65 years of age or older.

There were 21 housing units, of which 33.3% were vacant. The homeowner vacancy rate was 0.0% and the rental vacancy rate was 0.0%.

Racial composition as of the 2020 census
Race	Number	Percent
White	16	43.2%
Black or African American	0	0.0%
American Indian and Alaska Native	2	5.4%
Asian	0	0.0%
Native Hawaiian and Other Pacific Islander	0	0.0%
Some other race	10	27.0%
Two or more races	9	24.3%
Hispanic or Latino (of any race)	17	45.9%

== Education ==
It is in the Turpin Public Schools school district.
