= Oklahoma panhandle =

Strip in north-western Oklahoma, U.S.

- Incorporated and unorganized territory of the United States
- 1850–1890
- The three counties of the Oklahoma Panhandle
- Area
  - Coordinates: 36°45′N 101°30′W
- Government
  - Type: Provisional, unelected, unrecognized
- President
  - 1886–1887: Owen G. Chase
- History
  - Republic of Texas founded; includes Panhandle area: March 2, 1836
  - Texas surrenders claim; Panhandle becomes "unattached" territory: 1850
  - First petition for territorial status sent to Congress: February 1887
  - Second petition for territorial status sent to Congress: December 1887
  - Attached to Oklahoma Territory: 1890
Preceded by	Succeeded by
Texas	Oklahoma

The Oklahoma panhandle (formerly called No Man's Land, the Public Land Strip, the Neutral Strip, or Cimarron Territory) is a panhandle in the extreme northwestern region of the U.S. state of Oklahoma. Its constituent counties are, from west to east, Cimarron, Texas, and Beaver. As with other salients in the United States, its name comes from the similarity of its shape to the handle of a pan. Its largest city is Guymon in Texas County. Black Mesa State Park, located in Cimarron County, is the highest point in the state. Other points of interest include Beaver Dunes Park, Optima Lake, and the Optima National Wildlife Refuge. Oklahoma Panhandle State University is located in Goodwell.

Paleo-Indian people settled in the region around 8450 BCE. Native American horticulturists inhabited the region before the European colonists arrived in the 16th century. The area became part of New Spain with the Adams–Onís Treaty of 1819, which set the western boundary of the Louisiana Purchase at the 100th meridian. The outcome of the Mexican War of Independence made the panhandle a part of Mexico in 1821. The area was part of the Texas Republic from its formation in 1836 until Texas became part of the United States in 1846, which left the area federal property. The area was incorporated into Oklahoma Territory and later split into three counties when Oklahoma obtained statehood in 1907.

As of the 2020 United States census, the region has a population of 28,729, and Texas County is the only county in Oklahoma to have a plurality of Hispanic residents, which make up 48.1 percent of the county's population. Its economy is primarily agricultural, and its political elections sway in favor of the Republican Party.

== Geography ==
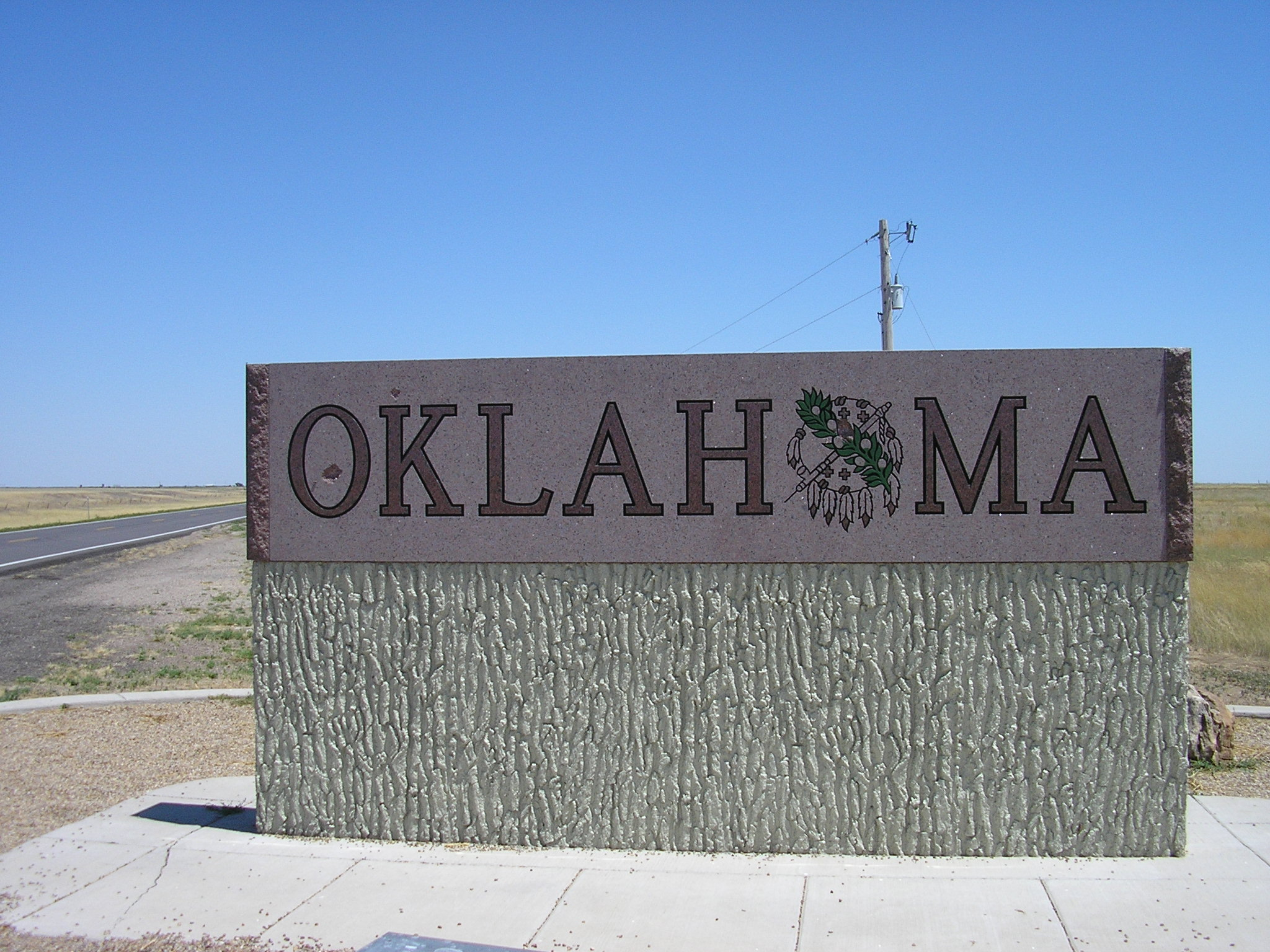
State welcome sign on the New Mexico state line of the panhandle

The panhandle, 166 miles (267 km) long and 34 miles (55 km) wide, is bordered by Kansas and Colorado at 37°N on the north, New Mexico at 103°W on the west, Texas at 36.5°N on the south, and the remainder of Oklahoma at 100°W on the east.

The largest town in the region is Guymon, which is the county seat of Texas County. Black Mesa, the highest point in Oklahoma at 4,973 feet (1,516 m), is located in Cimarron County. The panhandle occupies nearly all of the true High Plains within Oklahoma, being the only part of the state lying west of the 100th meridian, which generally marks the westernmost extent of moist air from the Gulf of Mexico. The North Canadian River is named Beaver River or Beaver Creek on its course through the panhandle. Its land area is 5,686 square miles (14,730 km^{2}) which is 8.28 percent of Oklahoma's land area. The area includes Beaver Dunes Park with sand dunes along the Beaver River and Optima Lake, the home of the Optima National Wildlife Refuge.

Unlike most of Oklahoma, the panhandle is not in the Sun Belt. The Kinder Institute defines the Sun Belt as areas south of 36°30′N latitude, which is the southern border of the panhandle.

== History ==
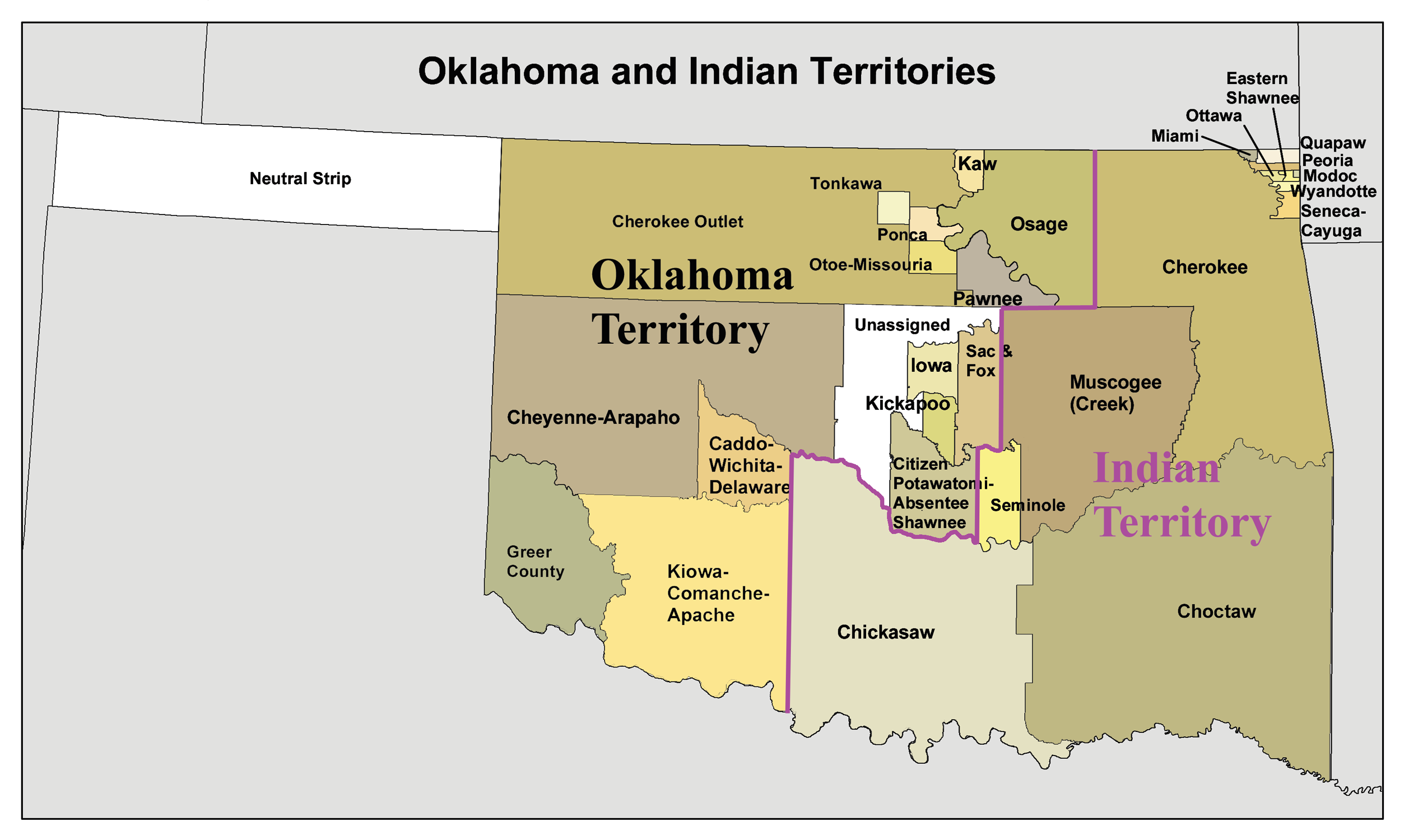
Map of Oklahoma Territory, Indian Territory and the "neutral strip"

The 1845 Texas annexation included the area of the future Oklahoma panhandle.

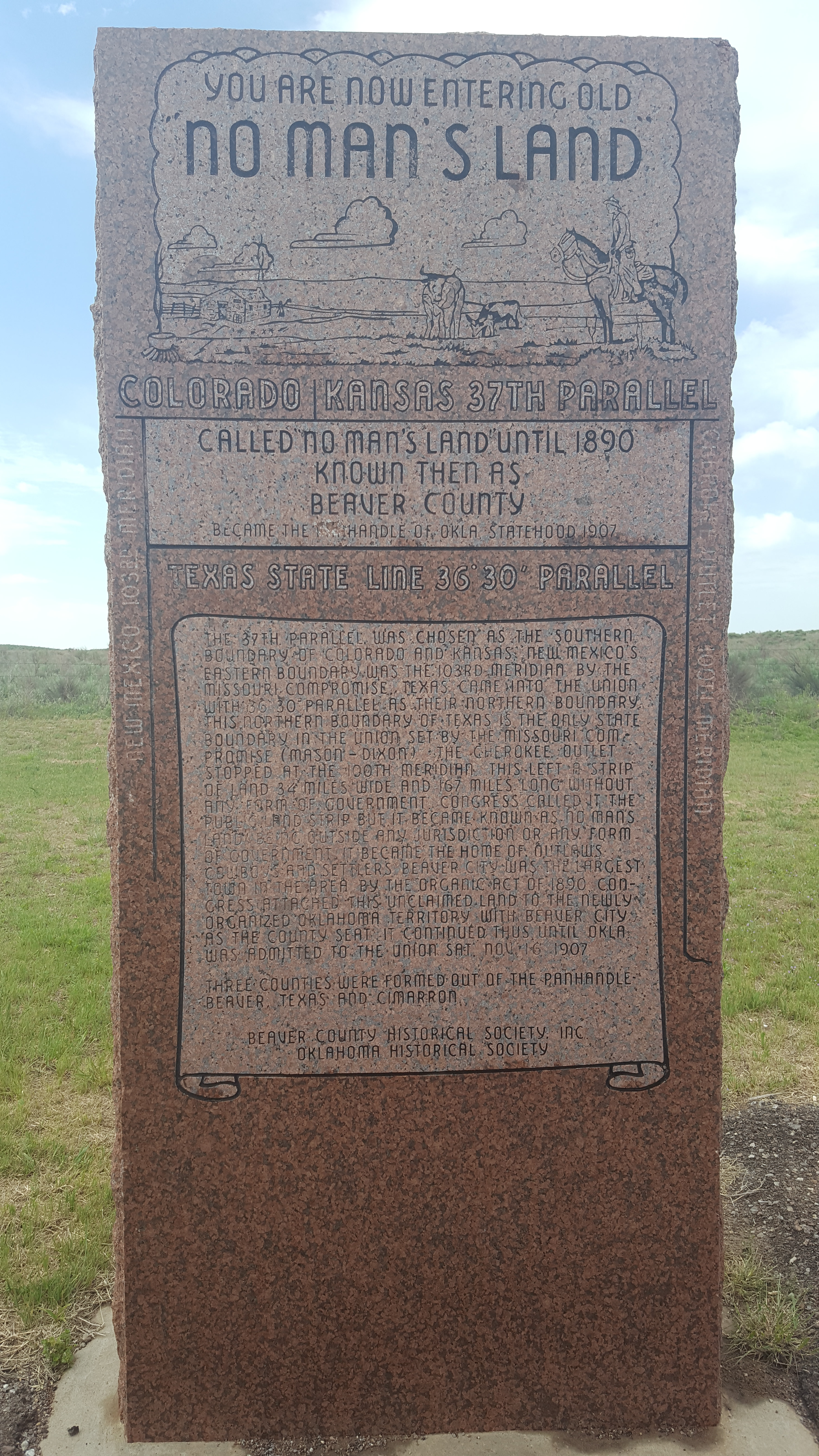
No Man's Land Monument, U.S. Highway 64 east of Gate (Oklahoma panhandle)

What is now the Oklahoma panhandle has been occupied for millennia. The Paleo-Indian people of the region were part of the Beaver River complex. A Paleo-Indian encampment, the Bull Creek site, dates back to approximately 8450 BCE, and the Badger Hole site dates to circa 8400 BCE.

Shortly before the arrival of European explorers, the panhandle was home to Southern Plains villagers. From 1200 to 1500, the semi-sedentary panhandle culture peoples, including the Antelope Creek phase, lived in the region in large, stone-slab and plaster houses in villages or individual homesteads. As horticulturists, they farmed maize and indigenous crops from the Eastern Agricultural Complex. Several Antelope Creek phase sites were founded near present-day Guymon, including the McGrath, Stamper and Two Sisters sites. The arrival of horses from Spain in the 16th century allowed American Indian tribes to increase their hunting ranges. These Southern Plains villagers became the Wichita and Affiliated Tribes.

The Western history of the panhandle traces its origins as being part of New Spain. The Adams–Onís Treaty of 1819 between Spain and the United States set the western boundary of this portion of the Louisiana Purchase at the 100th meridian. With Mexican independence in 1821, these lands became part of Mexico. With the formation of the Texas Republic, they became part of Texas. When Texas joined the U.S. in 1846, the strip became part of the United States.

The Cimarron Cutoff for the Santa Fe Trail passed through the area soon after the trade route was established in 1826 between the Mexicans in Santa Fe and the Americans in St. Louis. The route was increasingly used during the California Gold Rush. The cutoff passed several miles north of what are now Boise City, Oklahoma, and Clayton, New Mexico, before continuing toward Santa Fe.

When Texas sought to enter the Union in 1845 as a slave state, federal law in the United States, based on the Missouri Compromise, prohibited slavery north of 36°30′ north latitude. Under the Compromise of 1850, Texas surrendered its lands north of 36°30′, rather than have a portion of the state as "free" territory. The 170-mile strip of land, a "neutral strip", was left with no state or territorial ownership from 1850 until 1890. It was officially called the "Public Land Strip" and was commonly referred to as "No Man's Land."

The Compromise of 1850 also established the eastern boundary of New Mexico Territory at the 103rd meridian, thus setting the western boundary of the strip. The Kansas–Nebraska Act of 1854 set the southern border of Kansas Territory as the 37th parallel. This became the northern boundary of "No Man's Land." When Kansas joined the Union in 1861, the western part of Kansas Territory was assigned to the Colorado Territory but did not change the boundary of "No Man's Land."

=== Cimarron Territory ===
After the Civil War, cattlemen moved into the area. Gradually they organized themselves into ranches and established their own rules for arranging their land and adjudicating their disputes. There was still confusion over the status of the strip, and some attempts were made to arrange rent with the Cherokees, despite the fact that the Cherokee Outlet ended at the 100th meridian. In 1885, the U. S. Supreme Court ruled that the strip was not part of the Cherokee Outlet. In 1886, Interior Secretary L. Q. C. Lamar declared the area to be public domain and subject to "squatter's rights".

The strip was not yet surveyed, and as that was one of the requirements of the Homestead Act of 1862, the land could not be officially settled. Settlers by the thousands flooded in to assert their "squatter's rights" anyway. They surveyed their own land and by September 1886 had organized a self-governing and self-policing jurisdiction, which they named the Cimarron Territory from the Spanish word cimarrón, meaning wild or untamed. Senator Daniel W. Voorhees of Indiana introduced a bill in Congress to attach the so-called territory to Kansas. It passed both the Senate and the House of Representatives but was not signed by President Grover Cleveland.

The organization of Cimarron Territory began soon after Secretary Lamar declared the area open to settlement by squatters. The settlers formed their own vigilance committees, which organized a board charged with forming a territorial government. The board enacted a preliminary code of law and divided the strip into three districts. They also called for a general election to choose three members from each district to form a government.

The elected council met as planned, elected Owen G. Chase as president, and named a full cabinet. They also enacted further laws and divided the strip into five counties (Benton, Beaver, Palo Duro, Optima, and Sunset), three senatorial districts (with three members from each district), and seven delegate districts (with two members from each district). The members from these districts were to be the legislative body for the proposed territory. Elections were held November 8, 1887, and the legislature met for the first time on December 5, 1887.

Chase went to Washington, D.C., to lobby for admission to Congress as the delegate from the new territory. He was not recognized by Congress. A group disputing the Chase organization met and elected and sent its own delegate to Washington. A bill was introduced to accept Chase but was never brought to a vote. Neither delegation was able to persuade Congress to accept the new territory. Another delegation went in 1888 but was also unsuccessful.

=== Settlement and assimilation ===
In 1889, the Unassigned Lands to the east of the territory were opened for settlement, and many of the residents went there. The remaining population was generously estimated by Chase at 10,000 after the opening. Ten years later, an actual count revealed a population of 2,548. The passage of the Organic Act in 1890 assigned Public Land Strip to the new Oklahoma Territory, and ended the short-lived Cimarron Territory aspirations.

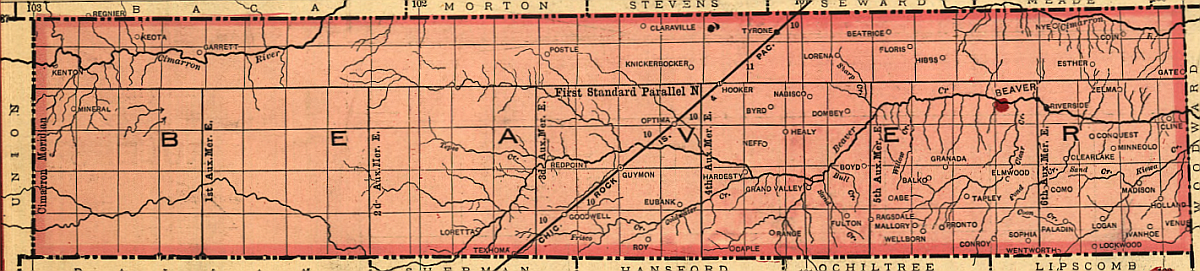
Beaver County encompassed the whole panhandle from 1890 until statehood.

In 1891, the government completed the survey, and the remaining squatters were finally able to secure their homesteads under the Homestead Act. The new owners were then able to obtain mortgages against their property, enabling them to buy seed and equipment. Capital and new settlers came into the area, and the first railroad, the Rock Island, built a line through the county from Liberal, Kansas, to Dalhart, Texas. Agriculture began changing from subsistence farms to grain exporters.

"No Man's Land" became Seventh County under the newly organized Oklahoma Territory and was soon renamed Beaver County. Beaver City became the county seat. When Oklahoma Territory and Indian Territory were combined in 1907 as the state of Oklahoma, Beaver County was divided into Beaver, Texas, and Cimarron counties. The Oklahoma panhandle had the highest population at its first census in 1910, 32,433 residents, compared to 28,729 in the 2020 census.

=== Dust Bowl ===
The panhandle was severely affected by the drought of the 1930s. The drought began in 1932 and created massive dust storms. By 1935, the area was widely known as being part of the Dust Bowl. The dust storms were largely a result of poor farming techniques and the plowing up of the native grasses that had held the fine soil in place. Despite government efforts to implement conservation measures and change the basic farming methods of the region, the Dust Bowl persisted for nearly a decade. It contributed significantly to the length of the Great Depression in the United States. Each of the three counties experienced a major loss of population during the 1930s.

The social impact of the dust bowl and the resulting emigration of tenant farmers from Oklahoma is the setting for the 1939 novel The Grapes of Wrath by Nobel Prize-winning author John Steinbeck.

== Demographics ==
Historical population
Census	Pop.	Note	%±
1910	32,433		—
1920	31,459		−3.0%
1930	30,960		−1.6%
1940	21,598		−30.2%
1950	26,235		21.5%
1960	25,623		−2.3%
1970	26,779		4.5%
1980	28,181		5.2%
1990	25,743		−8.7%
2000	29,112		13.1%
2010	28,751		−1.2%
2020	28,729		−0.1%
U.S. Decennial Census data for Cimarron, Texas and Beaver Counties in Oklahoma.

As of the 2010 census, there were a total of 28,751 people, 10,451 households, and 7,466 families in the three counties that comprise the Oklahoma panhandle. The racial makeup of the region was 80.26% white (including persons of mixed race), 59.46% non-Hispanic white, 1.34% African American, 1.21% Native American, 1.18% Asian, 0.12% Pacific Islander, 15.53% from other races, and 2.78% from two or more races. Hispanic and Latino Americans made up 35.85% of the population. The median income for a household in the region was $34,404, and the median income for a family was $40,006. Males had a median income of $27,444 versus $19,559 for females. The per capita income for the region was $16,447.

== Cities and towns ==
=== Largest municipalities ===
County seat†

Rank	Name	Type	Population	Area	County	Inc.	Note
1	Guymon†	City	12,965	7.76 sq mi	Texas	1901	Only Hispanic majority city or town in Oklahoma.
2	Hooker	City	1,802	1.11 sq mi	Texas		
3	Beaver†	Town	1,280	1.15 sq mi	Beaver		Host to the annual World Cow Chip Throwing Championship.
4	Boise City†	City	1,166	1.48 sq mi	Cimarron	1925	
5	Goodwell	Town	951	2.22 sq mi	Texas	1903	Home to Oklahoma Panhandle State University.
6	Texhoma	Town	856	0.64 sq mi	Texas	1908	Divided city with Texhoma, Texas. The two cities have a combined population of 1,114.
7	Tyrone	Town	729	0.4 sq mi	Texas		
8	Forgan	Town	450	0.39 sq mi	Beaver		
9	Turpin	Census designated place	442	1.00 sq mi	Beaver		
10	Little Ponderosa	Census designated place	438	0.75 sq mi	Beaver		

=== Other communities ===
- Adams
- Balko
- Felt
- Floris
- Gate
- Hardesty
- Kenton
- Keyes
- Knowles
- Optima
- Wheeless

== Economy ==
The panhandle is rather thinly populated (when compared to the rest of Oklahoma); this makes the labor force in this region very small. Farming and ranching operations occupy most of the economic activity in the region, with ranching dominating the drier western end. The region's higher educational needs are served by Oklahoma Panhandle State University in Goodwell, 10 miles southwest of Guymon.

== Politics ==
The Oklahoma panhandle is one of the most universally Republican areas of what has become one of the most Republican states in the nation. Beaver and Texas counties last supported a Democrat for president in 1948, while Cimarron County last supported a Democrat in 1976. In the 2024 U.S. presidential election, the three counties gave a weighted average of 86.1% of their votes to Donald Trump and 12.3% to Kamala Harris, with Trump carrying the state over Harris 66.2% to 31.9%.

In the 2006 Oklahoma gubernatorial election, the Oklahoma panhandle counties were the only three where the majority voted against the reelected Democratic incumbent, Governor Brad Henry. In 2012, Democratic voters in the panhandle voted for Randall Terry, an anti-abortion activist, over incumbent Democrat Barack Obama in the Democratic Presidential primary.

Results by precinct in the panhandle of the same-sex marriage ban referendum. Yes: 90–100%; 80–90%; 70–80%; 60–70%

In 2004, Oklahoma passed a constitutional amendment banning same-sex marriage. In the three panhandle counties, 8,482 (84.71%) voted in favor, and 1,531 (15.29%) voted against.

Presidential election results

Including the entirety of Cimarron, Texas, and Beaver County
Year	Republican	Democratic	Others
2024	86.1% 7,117	12.3% 1,017	1.6% 131
2020	85.0% 7,443	13.2% 1,154	1.8% 156
2016	83.3% 7,577	12.1% 1,105	4.6% 420
2012	86.9% 8,074	13.1% 1,221	0.0% 0
2008	86.6% 8,654	13.4% 1,340	0.0% 0
2004	85.7% 8,964	14.3% 1,497	0.0% 0
2000	82.6% 8,286	16.5% 1,650	0.9% 92
1996	70.3% 7,018	21.1% 2,108	8.5% 855
1992	61.3% 6,723	21.5% 2,462	19.8% 2,269
1988	72.4% 8,137	26.4% 2,964	1.2% 132
1984	83.4% 10,077	15.9% 1,928	0.7% 80
1980	76.9% 9,337	20.8% 2,520	2.3% 281
1976	57.2% 6,592	41.4% 4,766	1.4% 162
1972	80.3% 9,638	14.7% 1,769	5.0% 601
1968	63.2% 6,965	20.3% 2,236	16.5% 1,820
1964	57.3% 6,546	42.7% 4,886	0.0% 0
1960	72.0% 8,072	28.0% 3,132	0.0% 0
1956	63.8% 8,173	36.2% 3,644	0.0% 0
1952	70.1% 8,072	29.9% 3,439	0.0% 0
1948	42.0% 3,746	58.0% 5,183	0.0% 0
1944	51.1% 4,466	48.3% 4,220	0.6% 58
1940	45.6% 4,978	53.7% 5,854	0.7% 80
1936	30.5% 3,118	69.0% 7,073	0.5% 53
1932	28.0% 3,301	72.0% 8,481	0.0% 0
1928	70.3% 6,625	28.6% 2,693	1.1% 110
1924	45.6% 3,896	43.0% 3,679	11.4% 976
1920	56.2% 4,365	37.8% 2,939	6.0% 458
1916	32.6% 1,958	51.8% 3,118	15.6% 938
1912	40.9% 2,016	41.2% 2,032	17.9% 887
1908	45.7% 3,048	46.9% 3,131	7.4% 497

== Points of interest ==
- Black Mesa State Park features a hiking trail to the top of Oklahoma's highest point.
- Beaver Dunes Park features massive sand dunes along the Beaver River – located just north of the town of Beaver.
- Optima Lake is home to the Optima National Wildlife Refuge.
