= Little Ponderosa, Oklahoma =

Unincorporated community in Oklahoma, US

- Census-designated place
- Location within Oklahoma Location within the United States
- Coordinates: 36°57′24″N 100°52′39″W
- Country: United States
- State: Oklahoma
- County: Beaver

Area
  - Total: 0.75 sq mi (1.94 km^{2})
  - Land: 0.75 sq mi (1.94 km^{2})
  - Water: 0 sq mi (0.00 km^{2})
- Elevation: 2,800 ft (850 m)

Population (2020)
  - Total: 438
  - Density: 585.7/sq mi (226.15/km^{2})
- Time zone: UTC-6 (Central (CST))
  - Summer (DST): UTC-5 (CDT)
- ZIP Code: 73950 (Turpin)
- Area code: 580
- FIPS code: 40-43425
- GNIS feature ID: 2629929

Little Ponderosa is a census-designated place (CDP) in Beaver County, Oklahoma, United States. As of the 2020 census, Little Ponderosa had a population of 438. Within the Oklahoma Panhandle, it was first listed as a CDP after the 2010 census. Little Ponderosa is in the northwest corner of Beaver County, on the west side of U.S. Routes 83 and 270. It is about 7 miles (11 km) southeast of Liberal, Kansas.

== Demographics ==
Historical population
Census	Pop.	Note	%±
2020	438		—
U.S. Decennial Census

=== 2020 census ===
As of the 2020 census, Little Ponderosa had a population of 438. The median age was 38.6 years. 31.5% of residents were under the age of 18 and 13.7% of residents were 65 years of age or older. For every 100 females there were 87.2 males, and for every 100 females age 18 and over there were 91.1 males age 18 and over.

0.0% of residents lived in urban areas, while 100.0% lived in rural areas.

There were 151 households in Little Ponderosa, of which 45.0% had children under the age of 18 living in them. Of all households, 55.6% were married-couple households, 26.5% were households with a male householder and no spouse or partner present, and 14.6% were households with a female householder and no spouse or partner present. About 25.2% of all households were made up of individuals and 9.9% had someone living alone who was 65 years of age or older.

There were 160 housing units, of which 5.6% were vacant. The homeowner vacancy rate was 0.0% and the rental vacancy rate was 0.0%.

Racial composition as of the 2020 census
Race	Number	Percent
White	264	60.3%
Black or African American	0	0.0%
American Indian and Alaska Native	8	1.8%
Asian	1	0.2%
Native Hawaiian and Other Pacific Islander	1	0.2%
Some other race	131	29.9%
Two or more races	33	7.5%
Hispanic or Latino (of any race)	197	45.0%

== Education ==
Little Ponderosa is in the Turpin Public Schools school district.
