= Cline, Oklahoma =

Ghost town in Beaver County, Oklahoma, US

- Ghost town
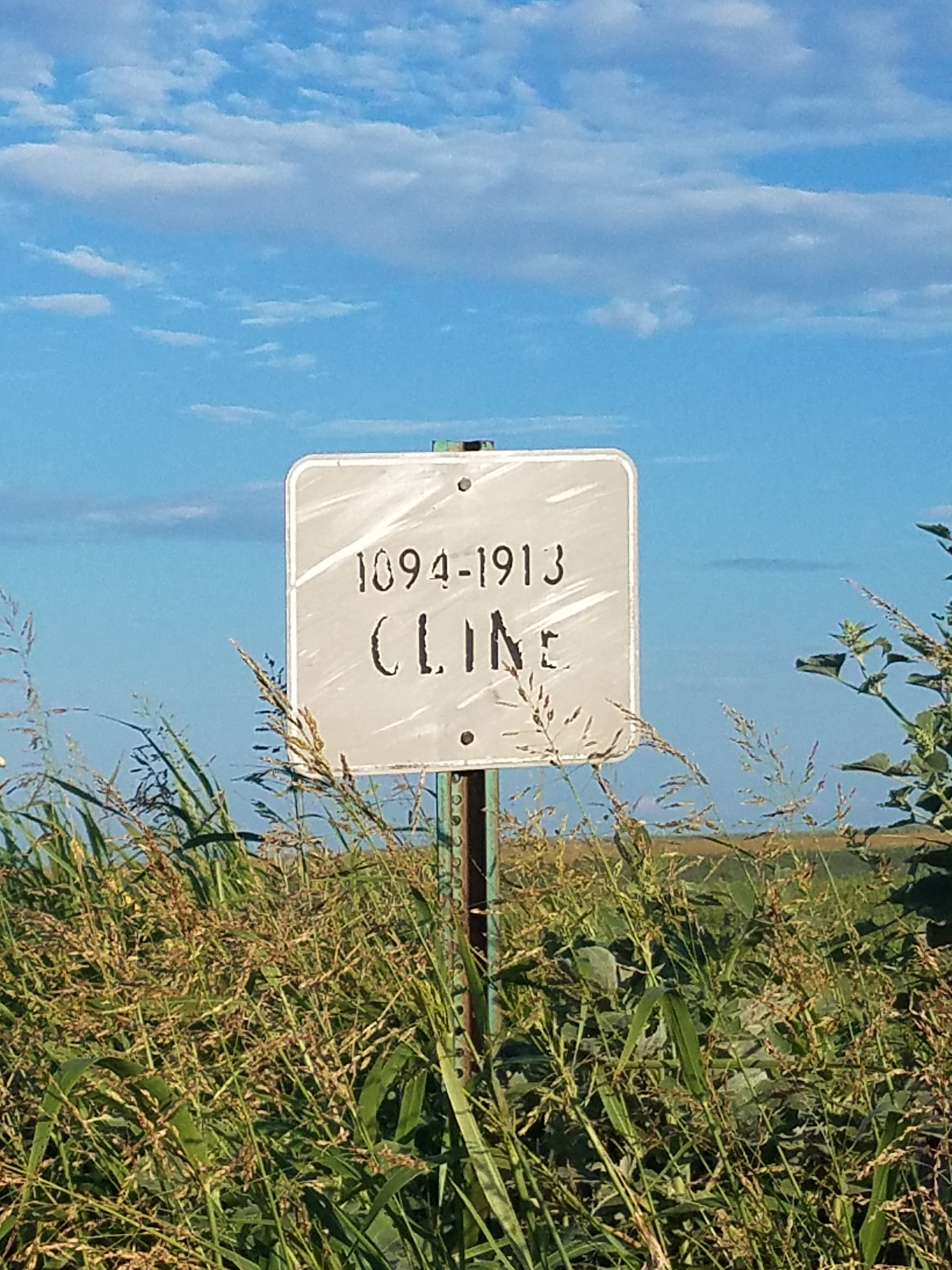
- What remains of Cline
- Interactive map of Cline, Oklahoma
- Coordinates: 36°46′33.2″N 100°02′25.0″W
- Country: United States
- State: Oklahoma
- County: Beaver County
- Time zone: Central (CST)

Cline is a ghost town in Beaver County, Oklahoma, United States. It is located approximately one-half mile from the nearest highway built by the WPA. By the time the highway was constructed, Cline had been disestablished.

== History ==
Cline was founded on May 5, 1894, as a farm town and was dissolved on March 31, 1948. Before Cline was disestablished it used to have a post office, cemetery (located at 36.77534°N 100.00740°W), store, and school, as well as a large population for its time. In 1905, a blacksmithy was built as well as a feed barn to sell feed and hold stock sales.

In 1912, the stock was moved to Gate, the post office was discontinued and the mail came from Gate by Star Route. The store in 1901 was run by a man by the name of J. B. Lamaster. John and Bob Carr operated the store and post office later on.

=== Cline School ===
Cline school was built just west of Cline store (Sec.33, T. 3, R. 29), and then later moved on land owned by A. H. Laverty (Sec. 19, Y. 3 R. 28) in approximately 1911 or 1912. Its name changed multiple times starting out as Cline School then changing to Highland about 1920, there were two teachers that taught there for its time. Suppers and lunches were eaten in the Cline store because it was walking distance to the school before it was moved.

Cline Cemetery was established around 1893-1894. Its two acres were sold in 1908 for $150, to become what is now Meridian Cemetery Beaver County, Oklahoma.

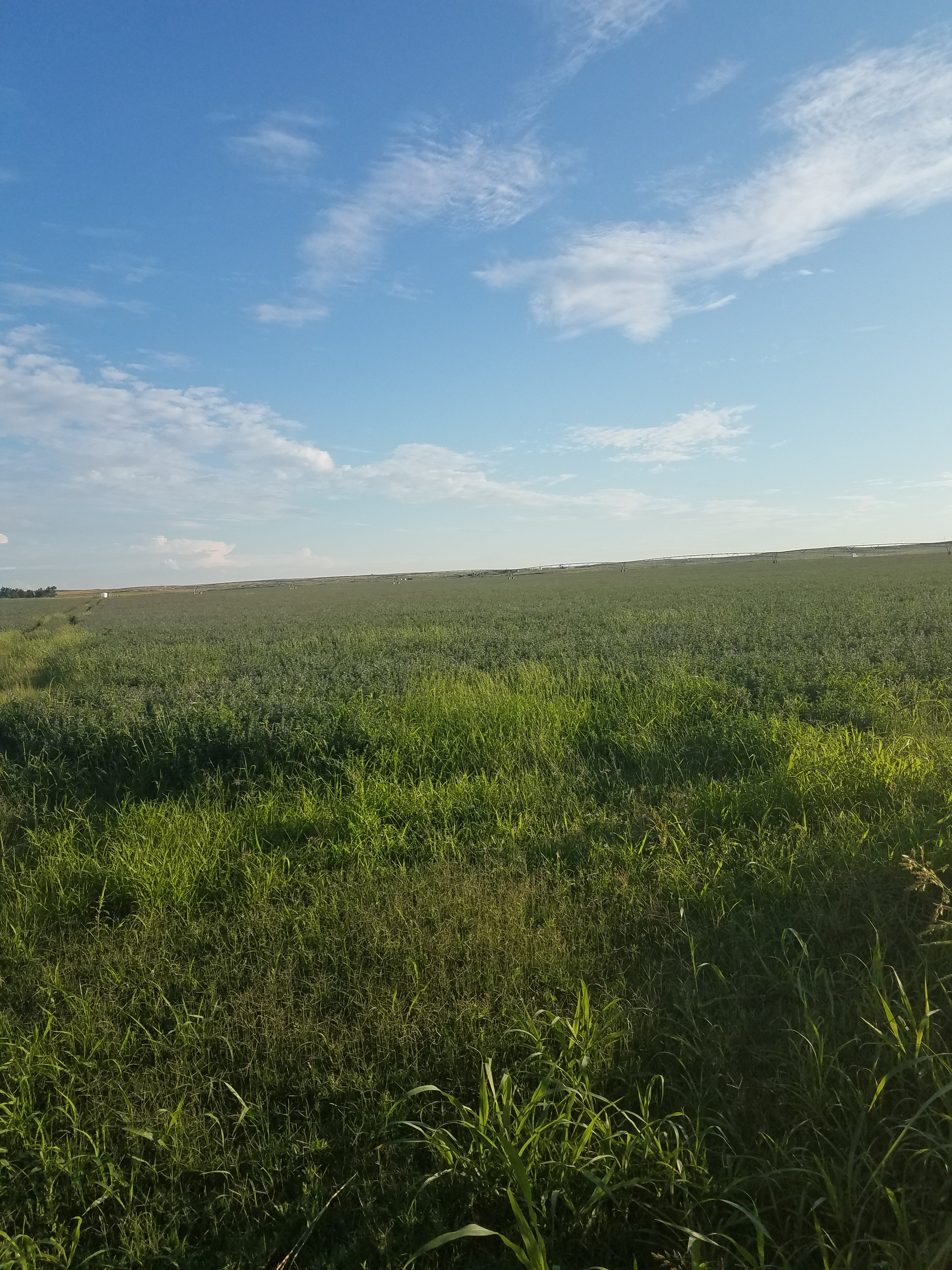
Where cline would have set is all now farmland.

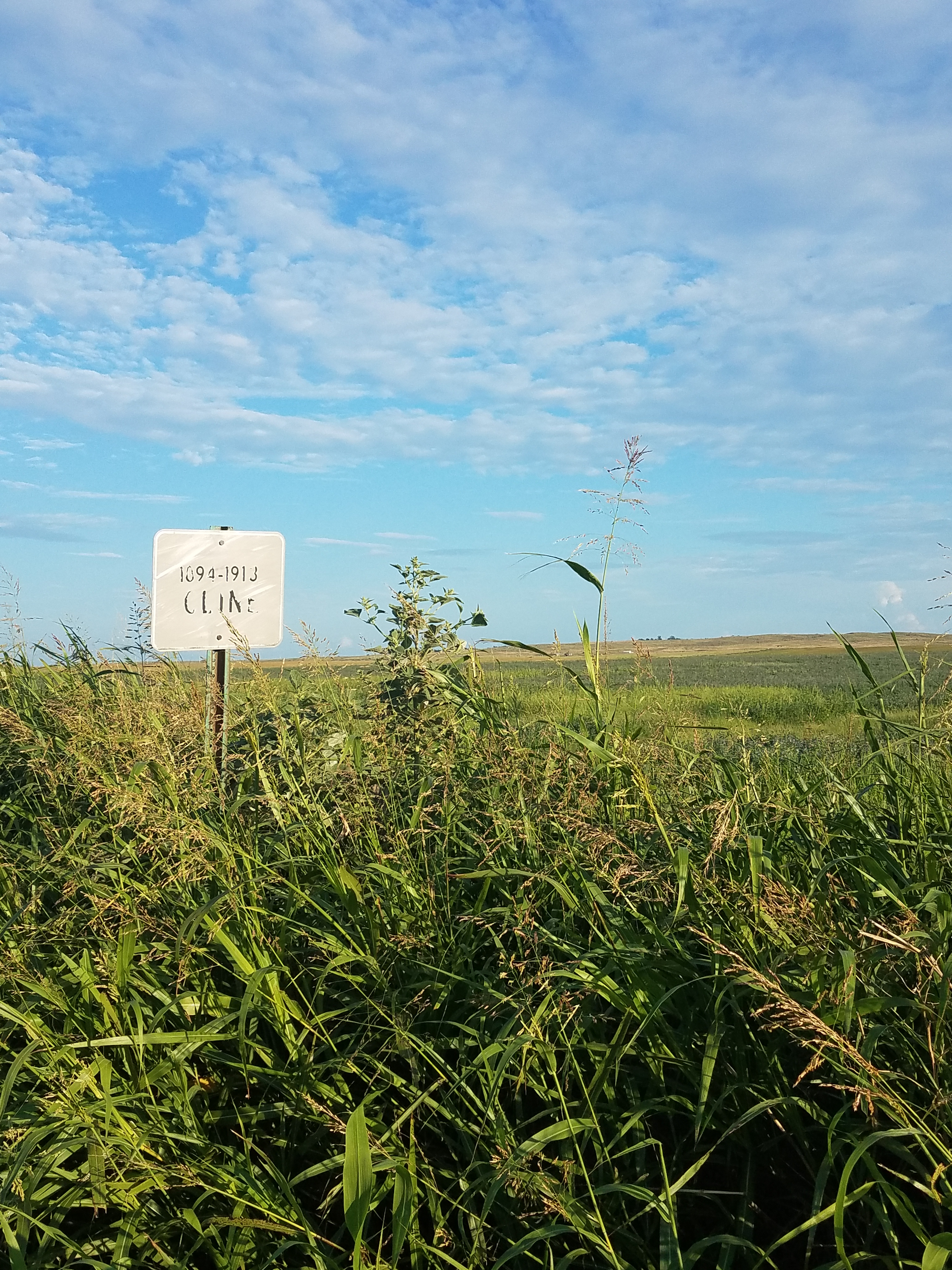
With the sign and same setting.

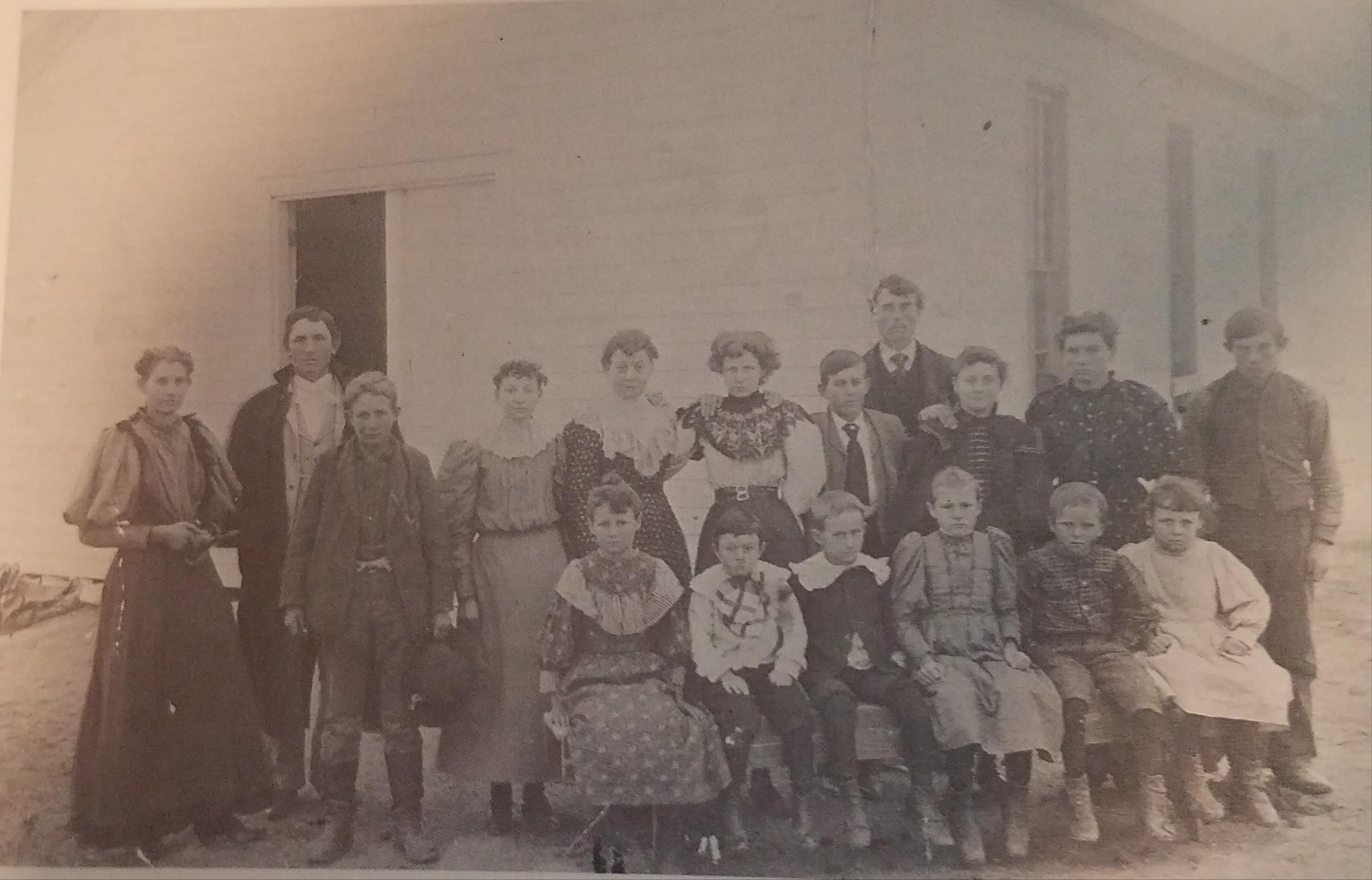
Cline schools class of 1897-1898
