= Baker Woodframe Elevator =

- U.S. National Register of Historic Places
- Location within Oklahoma Location within the United States
- Location: SR 2847, Baker, Oklahoma
- Coordinates: 36°52′14″N 101°1′3″W
- Area: less than one acre
- Built: 1926
- Built by: Kimber Milling Company
- MPS: Woodframe Grain Elevators of Oklahoma Panhandle TR
- NRHP reference No.: 83002130
- Added to NRHP: May 13, 1983

The Baker Woodframe Elevator was a historic grain elevator in Baker, Oklahoma. The wood frame elevator was built for the Kimber Milling Company in 1926. The elevator was located at the intersection of the Chicago Rock Island and Pacific and the Beaver, Meade and Englewood . The railroad shipped wheat harvested in Baker to the Gulf Coast. The elevator operated until 1974, when the railroads ended their service to Baker. No remains of this elevator are evident. It existed just north of another elevator built in the 1970s that still remains.

The elevator was added to the National Register of Historic Places on May 13, 1983.

== See also ==
- Baker Woodframe Grain Elevator, another historic grain elevator in Baker
