= Old Settler's Irrigation Ditch =

- U.S. National Register of Historic Places
- Location within Oklahoma
- Location: Intersects U.S. Route 283 north of Rosston, Oklahoma
- Coordinates: 36.948611°N 99.963056°W
- Area: 7.5 acres (3.0 ha)
- Built: 1893-1905
- Built by: Settler's Milling Canal & Reserv.
- NRHP reference No.: 83002070
- Added to NRHP: July 27, 1983

The Old Settler's Irrigation Ditch, near Rosston, Oklahoma, in both Beaver County, Oklahoma and Harper County, Oklahoma, was constructed during 1893 to 1905. It was listed on the National Register of Historic Places listings in Beaver County, Oklahoma in 1983.

It enabled Ditch Valley to become a lush green area, in contrast to the surrounding arid lands. It is about 12 feet (3.7 m) wide for much of its 14 miles (23 km) length. It is supplied by water from a diversion dam on the Cimarron River.
