= Knowles, Oklahoma =

Town in Oklahoma, US

- Town
- Location in Beaver County and state of Oklahoma.
- Coordinates: 36°52′22″N 100°11′33″W
- Country: United States
- State: Oklahoma
- County: Beaver

Area
  - Total: 0.20 sq mi (0.51 km^{2})
  - Land: 0.20 sq mi (0.51 km^{2})
  - Water: 0 sq mi (0.00 km^{2})
- Elevation: 2,530 ft (770 m)

Population (2020)
  - Total: 6
  - Density: 30.2/sq mi (11.66/km^{2})
- Time zone: UTC-6 (Central (CST))
  - Summer (DST): UTC-5 (CDT)
- ZIP code: 73847
- Area code: 580
- FIPS code: 40-40100
- GNIS feature ID: 2412843

Knowles is a town in Beaver County, Oklahoma, United States. The population was 6 at the time of the 2020 census.

== History ==
The Knowles Grain Elevator is on the National Register of Historic Places listings in Beaver County, Oklahoma.

== Geography ==
According to the United States Census Bureau, Knowles has a total area of 0.2 square miles (0.52 km^{2}), all land.

Knowles is served by US Route 64.

== Demographics ==
Historical population
Census	Pop.	Note	%±
1930	219		—
1940	104		−52.5%
1950	91		−12.5%
1960	62		−31.9%
1970	52		−16.1%
1980	44		−15.4%
1990	18		−59.1%
2000	32		77.8%
2010	11		−65.6%
2020	6		−45.5%
U.S. Decennial Census

=== 2020 census ===
As of the 2020 census, Knowles had a population of 6. The median age was 42.5 years. 33.3% of residents were under the age of 18 and 16.7% of residents were 65 years of age or older. For every 100 females there were 200.0 males, and for every 100 females age 18 and over there were 300.0 males age 18 and over.

0.0% of residents lived in urban areas, while 100.0% lived in rural areas.

There were 0 households in Knowles. No households had children under the age of 18. There were no households headed by a single male or single female householder. There were no one-person households, including anyone living alone who was 65 years of age or older.

There were 9 housing units, of which 100.0% were vacant. The homeowner vacancy rate was 0.0% and the rental vacancy rate was 100.0%.

Racial composition as of the 2020 census
Race	Number	Percent
White	4	66.7%
Black or African American	0	0.0%
American Indian and Alaska Native	1	16.7%
Asian	0	0.0%
Native Hawaiian and Other Pacific Islander	0	0.0%
Some other race	0	0.0%
Two or more races	1	16.7%
Hispanic or Latino (of any race)	0	0.0%

=== 2000 census ===
As of the census of 2000, there were 32 people, 10 households, and 8 families residing in Knowles. The population density was 180.4 inhabitants per square mile (69.7/km^{2}). There were 11 housing units at an average density of 62.0 per square mile (23.9/km^{2}). The racial makeup of the town was 90.62% White, 9.38% from other races. Hispanic or Latino of any race were 25.00% of the population.

There were 10 households, out of which 50.0% had children under the age of 18 living with them, 70.0% were married couples living together, 10.0% had a female householder with no husband present, and 20.0% were non-families. 20.0% of all households were made up of individuals, and none had someone living alone who was 65 years of age or older. The average household size was 3.20 and the average family size was 3.75.

In Knowles, the population was spread out, with 37.5% under the age of 18, 18.8% from 18 to 24, 9.4% from 25 to 44, 25.0% from 45 to 64, and 9.4% who were 65 years of age or older. The median age was 24 years. For every 100 females, there were 100.0 males. For every 100 females age 18 and over, there were 81.8 males.

The median income for a household in Knowles was $24,583, and the median income for a family was $43,750. Males had a median income of $25,000 versus $20,833 for females. The per capita income for the town was $11,887. There were 33.3% of families and 43.5% of the population living below the poverty line, including 62.5% of those under 18 and none of those over 64.

== Education ==
Knowles is in the Forgan Public Schools school district.
