= Mocane, Oklahoma =

Unincorporated community in Oklahoma, US

- Unincorporated community
- Location within the state of Oklahoma Mocane, Oklahoma (the United States)
- Coordinates: 36°53′37″N 100°22′22″W
- Country: United States
- State: Oklahoma
- County: Beaver
- Elevation: 2,631 ft (802 m)
- Time zone: UTC-6 (Central (CST))
  - Summer (DST): UTC-5 (CDT)
- GNIS feature ID: 1100640

Mocane is an unincorporated community in Beaver County, Oklahoma, United States. Its elevation is 2,631 feet (802 m).

== History ==
A post office once operated in Mocane, but it is no longer in existence.

Mocane is the closest community to the Billy Rose Archeological Site, which is an address-restricted prehistoric location included on the National Register of Historic Places listings in Beaver County, Oklahoma.
