= Baker Woodframe Grain Elevator =

- U.S. National Register of Historic Places
- Location within Oklahoma Location within the United States
- Location: Off U.S. 64, Baker, Oklahoma
- Coordinates: 36°52′12″N 101°1′0″W
- Area: less than one acre
- Built: 1926
- Built by: Riffe & Gilmore Company
- MPS: Woodframe Grain Elevators of Oklahoma Panhandle TR
- NRHP reference No.: 83002131
- Added to NRHP: May 13, 1983

The Baker Woodframe Grain Elevator is a historic grain elevator in Baker, Oklahoma. The wood frame elevator was built in 1926 along the Beaver, Meade and Englewood Railroad by the Riffe & Gilmore Company. The elevator operated continuously from its opening until the early 1980s. Modern grain trucks proved to be too large for it in the mid 80's. Additional construction of steel bins to the west were added making the elevator an overflow storage. Over the years it has ceased operations yielding to the steel bins around it. The Riffe Gilmore location does still operate to this day, being one of very few still operating under the name, nearing 100 years of continued operations.

The elevator was added to the National Register of Historic Places on May 13, 1983.

The elevator still stands to this day, the larger bin to its south has a leaning head on it, the main elevator still stands as it has since 1926, making it one of few on the BM&E line holding its own.

== See also ==
- Baker Woodframe Elevator, another historic grain elevator in Baker
