= Rosston, Oklahoma =

- Town
- Location in Harper County and the state of Oklahoma.
- Coordinates: 36°48′46″N 99°55′58″W
- Country: United States
- State: Oklahoma
- County: Harper

Area
  - Total: 0.27 sq mi (0.71 km^{2})
  - Land: 0.27 sq mi (0.71 km^{2})
  - Water: 0 sq mi (0.00 km^{2})
- Elevation: 2,133 ft (650 m)

Population (2020)
  - Total: 52
  - Density: 189.7/sq mi (73.23/km^{2})
- Time zone: UTC-6 (Central (CST))
  - Summer (DST): UTC-5 (CDT)
- ZIP code: 73855
- Area code: 580
- FIPS code: 40-64050
- GNIS feature ID: 2412579

Rosston is a town in Harper County, Oklahoma, United States. The population was 52 at the time of the 2020 census.

== History ==
The Old Settler's Irrigation Ditch near Rosston is on the National Register of Historic Places listings in Beaver County, Oklahoma.

== Geography ==
According to the United States Census Bureau, the town has a total area of 0.3 square miles (0.78 km^{2}), all land.

== Demographics ==
Historical population
Census	Pop.	Note	%±
1920	181		—
1930	185		2.2%
1940	143		−22.7%
1950	85		−40.6%
1960	58		−31.8%
1970	56		−3.4%
1980	66		17.9%
1990	54		−18.2%
2000	66		22.2%
2010	31		−53.0%
2020	52		67.7%
U.S. Decennial Census

=== 2020 census ===
As of the 2020 census, Rosston had a population of 52. The median age was 28.0 years. 38.5% of residents were under the age of 18 and 15.4% of residents were 65 years of age or older. For every 100 females there were 147.6 males, and for every 100 females age 18 and over there were 100.0 males age 18 and over.

0.0% of residents lived in urban areas, while 100.0% lived in rural areas.

There were 16 households in Rosston, of which 56.3% had children under the age of 18 living in them. Of all households, 87.5% were married-couple households, 6.3% were households with a male householder and no spouse or partner present, and 6.3% were households with a female householder and no spouse or partner present. About 12.6% of all households were made up of individuals and 0.0% had someone living alone who was 65 years of age or older.

There were 19 housing units, of which 15.8% were vacant. The homeowner vacancy rate was 0.0% and the rental vacancy rate was 0.0%.

Racial composition as of the 2020 census
Race	Number	Percent
White	30	57.7%
Black or African American	0	0.0%
American Indian and Alaska Native	2	3.8%
Asian	0	0.0%
Native Hawaiian and Other Pacific Islander	0	0.0%
Some other race	9	17.3%
Two or more races	11	21.2%
Hispanic or Latino (of any race)	18	34.6%

=== 2000 census ===
As of the census of 2000, there were 66 people, 23 households, and 14 families residing in the town. The population density was 205.3 inhabitants per square mile (79.3/km^{2}). There were 29 housing units at an average density of 90.2 per square mile (34.8/km^{2}). The racial makeup of the town was 98.48% White, 1.52% from other races. Hispanic or Latino of any race were 10.61% of the population.

There were 23 households, out of which 26.1% had children under the age of 18 living with them, 43.5% were married couples living together, 4.3% had a female householder with no husband present, and 34.8% were non-families. 30.4% of all households were made up of individuals, and 17.4% had someone living alone who was 65 years of age or older. The average household size was 2.87 and the average family size was 3.73.

In the town, the population was spread out, with 39.4% under the age of 18, 3.0% from 18 to 24, 21.2% from 25 to 44, 28.8% from 45 to 64, and 7.6% who were 65 years of age or older. The median age was 32 years. For every 100 females, there were 127.6 males. For every 100 females age 18 and over, there were 110.5 males.

The median income for a household in the town was $39,167, and the median income for a family was $42,500. Males had a median income of $23,000 versus $21,250 for females. The per capita income for the town was $7,297. There were 11.1% of families and 11.2% of the population living below the poverty line, including 7.4% of under eighteens and 33.3% of those over 64.
