= Bryan's Corner, Oklahoma =

Unincorporated community in Oklahoma, US

- Unincorporated place
- Location within the state of Oklahoma
- Coordinates: 36°36′58.61″N 100°49′42.86″W
- Country: United States
- State: Oklahoma
- County: Beaver
- Time zone: UTC-6 (Central (CST))
  - Summer (DST): UTC-5 (CDT)

Bryan's Corner (or Bryans Corner) is an unincorporated place in Beaver County, Oklahoma, United States. It is located at the intersection of US-83 and US-412/SH-3 in the southwest part of the county. Bryan's Corner is nine miles (14 km) north of the Texas state line and 18 miles (29 km) south of Turpin.
