= Beaver County, Oklahoma =

County in Oklahoma, United States

- County
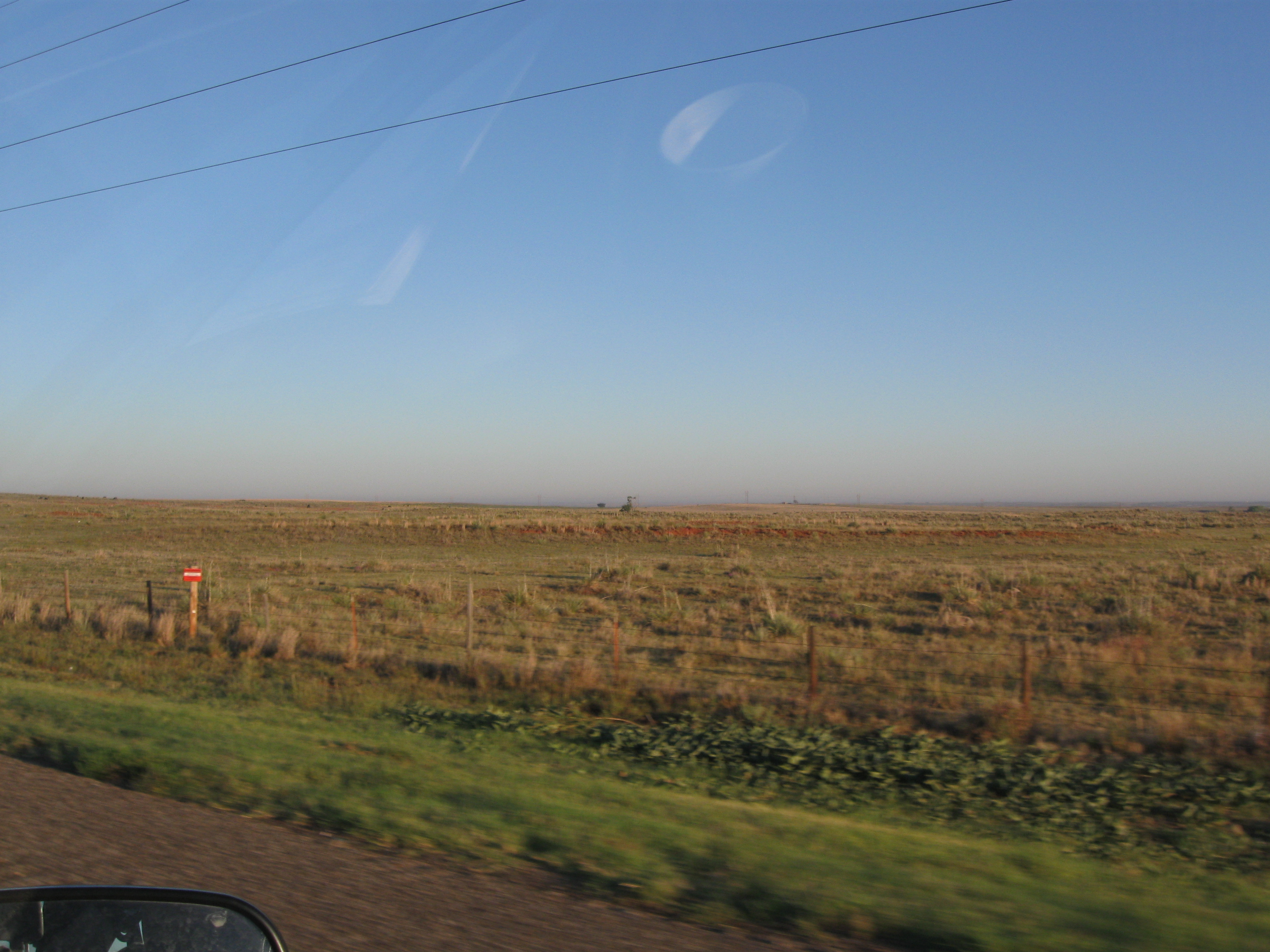
- Rural Beaver County (2011)

- Location within the U.S. state of Oklahoma
- Coordinates: 36.75°N 100.48°W
- Country: United States
- State: Oklahoma
- Founded: 1890
- Seat: Beaver
- Largest town: Beaver

Area
  - Total: 1,818 sq mi (4,710 km^{2})
  - Land: 1,815 sq mi (4,700 km^{2})
  - Water: 2.8 sq mi (7.3 km^{2}) 0.2%

Population (2020)
  - Total: 5,049
  - Estimate (2025): 4,882 ▼
  - Density: 3.1/sq mi (1.2/km^{2})
- Time zone: UTC−6 (Central)
  - Summer (DST): UTC−5 (CDT)
- Congressional district: 3rd
- Website: beaver.okcounties.org

Beaver County is a county located in the U.S. state of Oklahoma. As of the 2020 census, the population was 5,049. The county seat is Beaver. The name was given because of the presence of many beaver dams on the Beaver River, which runs through the area. It is located in the Oklahoma Panhandle.

== History ==
The land where Beaver County is located has been under several jurisdictions. At one time, it was part of Mexico and then Texas before Texas became a state of the United States. Then in the Compromise of 1850, Texas ceded the land that would eventually become the Oklahoma panhandle to the United States government. The area was known as "No Man's Land" because it belonged to no state or territorial government. From 1886 to 1890, it was a separate organized territory known as Cimarron Territory. After becoming part of the Oklahoma Territory in 1890, Beaver County (first called Seventh County) covered the entire Oklahoma Panhandle. At statehood in 1907, Cimarron County was taken from the western one-third, while Texas County was taken from the middle, leaving Beaver County only in the east. Its borders are now at 100°W (east), 37°N (north), 36.5°N (south), and approximately 100.8°W (west).

== Geography ==
According to the U.S. Census Bureau, the county has a total area of 1,818 square miles (4,710 km^{2}), of which 1,815 square miles (4,700 km^{2}) is land and 2.8 square miles (7.3 km^{2}) (0.2%) is water. It is the fifth-largest county in Oklahoma by area.

Just north of the town of Beaver is the Beaver Dunes Park.

=== Major highways ===
- U.S. Highway 64
- U.S. Highway 83
- U.S. Highway 270
- U.S. Highway 412 / State Highway 3
- State Highway 23

=== Adjacent counties ===
- Meade County, Kansas (north)
- Clark County, Kansas (northeast)
- Harper County (east)
- Ellis County (southeast)
- Lipscomb County, Texas (south)
- Ochiltree County, Texas (southwest)
- Texas County (west)
- Seward County, Kansas (northwest)

== Demographics ==
Historical population
Census	Pop.	Note	%±
1900	3,051		—
1910	13,631		346.8%
1920	14,048		3.1%
1930	11,452		−18.5%
1940	8,648		−24.5%
1950	7,411		−14.3%
1960	6,965		−6.0%
1970	6,282		−9.8%
1980	6,806		8.3%
1990	6,023		−11.5%
2000	5,857		−2.8%
2010	5,636		−3.8%
2020	5,049		−10.4%
2025 (est.)	4,882	▼	−3.3%
U.S. Decennial Census; 1790-1960 1900-1990; 1990-2000 2010

=== 2020 census ===
As of the 2020 census, the county had a population of 5,049. Of the residents, 25.8% were under the age of 18 and 21.0% were 65 years of age or older; the median age was 41.2 years. For every 100 females there were 101.6 males, and for every 100 females age 18 and over there were 102.4 males.

The racial makeup of the county was 75.5% White, 0.1% Black or African American, 0.9% American Indian and Alaska Native, 0.3% Asian, 15.8% from some other race, and 7.3% from two or more races. Hispanic or Latino residents of any race comprised 25.8% of the population.

There were 1,962 households in the county, of which 33.1% had children under the age of 18 living with them and 18.0% had a female householder with no spouse or partner present. About 23.8% of all households were made up of individuals and 12.0% had someone living alone who was 65 years of age or older.

There were 2,460 housing units, of which 20.2% were vacant. Among occupied housing units, 77.4% were owner-occupied and 22.6% were renter-occupied. The homeowner vacancy rate was 1.0% and the rental vacancy rate was 20.1%.

=== 2010 census ===
As of the 2010 census, there were a total of 5,636 people, 2,192 households, and 1,614 families in the county. The population density was 3 people per square mile (1.2 people/km^{2}). There were 2,719 housing units at an average density of 2 units per square mile (0.77/km^{2}). The racial makeup of the county was 92.71% White, 0.29% Black or African American, 1.25% Native American, 0.10% Asian, 0.03% Pacific Islander, 3.76% from other races, and 1.86% from two or more races. 10.76% of the population were Hispanic or Latino of any race.

There were 2,245 households, out of which 33.50% had children under the age of 18 living with them, 66.30% were married couples living together, 6.10% had a female householder with no husband present, and 24.00% were non-families. 22.00% of all households were made up of individuals, and 12.30% had someone living alone who was 65 years of age or older. The average household size was 2.57 and the average family size was 2.99.

In the county, the population was spread out, with 26.80% under the age of 18, 6.50% from 18 to 24, 25.80% from 25 to 44, 24.10% from 45 to 64, and 16.90% who were 65 years of age or older. The median age was 39 years. For every 100 females, there were 102.20 males. For every 100 females age 18 and over, there were 100.90 males.

The median income for a household in the county was $36,715, and the median income for a family was $41,542. Males had a median income of $31,013 versus $20,162 for females. The per capita income for the county was $17,905. About 8.80% of families and 11.70% of the population were below the poverty line, including 15.80% of those under age 18 and 7.80% of those age 65 or over.

== Politics ==
Voter Registration and Party Enrollment as of May 31, 2023
Party	Number of Voters	Percentage
Democratic	312	10.24%
Republican	2,370	77.80%
Others	364	11.95%
Total	3,046	100%

Although at one time competitive, Beaver has become strongly Republican in presidential elections. The last Democratic candidate to win the county was Harry Truman in 1948. In every election since 2000, the Republican presidential candidate has received over 85% of the county's vote.

It is part of Oklahoma's 3rd congressional district and as such is represented by Frank Lucas. In the Oklahoma Senate it is part of the 27th district and is represented by Republican Casey Murdock. In the Oklahoma House of Representatives it is part of the 61st district and is represented by Republican Kenton Patzkowsky.

Presidential election results

United States presidential election results for Beaver County, Oklahoma
Year	Republican		Democratic		Third party(ies)	
Year	No.	%	No.	%	No.	%
1908	1,362	48.89%	1,212	43.50%	212	7.61%
1912	1,070	42.75%	926	37.00%	507	20.26%
1916	913	32.91%	1,382	49.82%	479	17.27%
1920	1,973	59.99%	1,076	32.72%	240	7.30%
1924	1,565	49.42%	1,195	37.73%	407	12.85%
1928	2,596	73.67%	887	25.17%	41	1.16%
1932	1,358	34.72%	2,553	65.28%	0	0.00%
1936	1,340	34.69%	2,502	64.77%	21	0.54%
1940	2,219	51.82%	2,034	47.50%	29	0.68%
1944	1,913	58.06%	1,355	41.12%	27	0.82%
1948	1,420	47.08%	1,596	52.92%	0	0.00%
1952	2,539	75.61%	819	24.39%	0	0.00%
1956	2,046	68.38%	946	31.62%	0	0.00%
1960	2,442	73.36%	887	26.64%	0	0.00%
1964	1,982	56.79%	1,508	43.21%	0	0.00%
1968	2,114	68.70%	624	20.28%	339	11.02%
1972	2,562	80.41%	522	16.38%	102	3.20%
1976	1,801	58.84%	1,213	39.63%	47	1.54%
1980	2,430	75.51%	696	21.63%	92	2.86%
1984	2,689	82.69%	536	16.48%	27	0.83%
1988	2,013	71.03%	777	27.42%	44	1.55%
1992	1,699	59.61%	580	20.35%	571	20.04%
1996	1,893	72.50%	515	19.72%	203	7.77%
2000	2,092	85.18%	339	13.80%	25	1.02%
2004	2,272	88.44%	297	11.56%	0	0.00%
2008	2,199	89.25%	265	10.75%	0	0.00%
2012	2,062	89.42%	244	10.58%	0	0.00%
2016	1,993	88.85%	176	7.85%	74	3.30%
2020	1,968	90.36%	190	8.72%	20	0.92%
2024	1,938	91.24%	158	7.44%	28	1.32%

== Economy ==
Beaver County's economy has largely been based on agriculture since the turn of the 20th century. At first, the major crop was broomcorn, but that was overtaken by wheat in the 1920s. Railroads connected the county to agricultural markets and stimulated an influx of new farmers. Beginning in 1912, the Wichita Falls and Northwestern Railway built a line from Woodward through Gate to Forgan. The Beaver, Meade and Englewood Railroad completed a spur in 1915 from Beaver to Forgan, which was extended westward in 1925–1927 to Hooker. New towns arose along the rail lines or old ones relocated along them.

== Communities ==
=== Towns ===
- Beaver (county seat)
- Forgan
- Gate
- Knowles

=== Census-designated places ===
- Little Ponderosa
- Turpin

=== Other unincorporated communities ===
- Alpine
- Antelope
- Balko
- Beatrice
- Bluegrass
- Boyd
- Bryan's Corner
- Caleyville
- Clear lake
- Elmwood
- Floris
- Golden
- Gray
- Ivanhoe
- Lockwood
- Logan
- Madison
- Mocane
- Neutral City
- Rothwell
- Slapout
- Sod Town
- Sophia
- Sunset
- Surprise

=== Ghost towns ===
- Benton
- Cline
- LaKemp

== Recreation ==
The 17,700 acres (7,200 ha) Beaver River WMA provides wildlife, hunting, fishing, boating, and swimming recreation.

== Cemeteries ==
Area affected by 1930s Dust Bowl

=== Meridian Cemetery ===
Meridian Cemetery is a cemetery that is located at 36°46′1.7″N 100°00′26.9″W in Beaver County. There are many unmarked graves and many lost graves.

Originally known as Cline Cemetery, established sometime in 1893 or 1894, named after the City of Cline, which is now a ghost town, was sold to Meridian Cemetery Association in 1908. It was land originally owned by Phillip Huret, Jr. and consists of two acres of land. In 1908, it was sold for $150 to the Meridian Cemetery Association.

== NRHP sites ==
The following sites in Beaver County are listed on the National Register of Historic Places:

- Beaver County Courthouse, Beaver City
- Floris Grain Elevator, Floris
- Gate School, Gate
- Knowles Grain Elevator, Turpin
- Lane Cabin, Beaver City
- Lonker Archeological Site, Gate
- Old Settler's Irrigation Ditch, Rosston
- Presbyterian Church, Beaver City
- Rose, Billy, Archeological Site, Mocane
- Sharps Creek Crossing Site, Turpin
- Turpin Grain Elevator, Turpin

== Education ==
School districts:

- Balko Public Schools
- Beaver Public Schools
- Forgan Public Schools
- Laverne Public Schools
- Shattuck Public Schools
- Turpin Public Schools
