= Forgan Public Schools =

School district in Oklahoma

Forgan Public School

Address
- 504 West Main Street Forgan, Beaver, Oklahoma, 73938; United States

District information
- Type: Co-Educational, Public
- Grades: PreK–12
- Superintendent: Travis Smalts
- Accreditation: Oklahoma State Department of Education
- NCES District ID: 4011880

Students and staff
- Students: 117 (2020–2021)
- Teachers: 13.89 (on an FTE basis)
- Staff: 9.39 (on an FTE basis)
- Student–teacher ratio: 8.42:1
- District mascot: Bulldog
- Colors: red white

Other information
- Website: www.forgan.k12.ok.us

Forgan Public Schools is located in the small town of Forgan, Oklahoma. It contains a single K-12 school for all students. The school mascot is the bulldog.

Forgan High School has won the 2011 and 2012 Class B boys' basketball state championships.
