= Floris, Oklahoma =

Unincorporated community in Oklahoma, US

- Unincorporated community
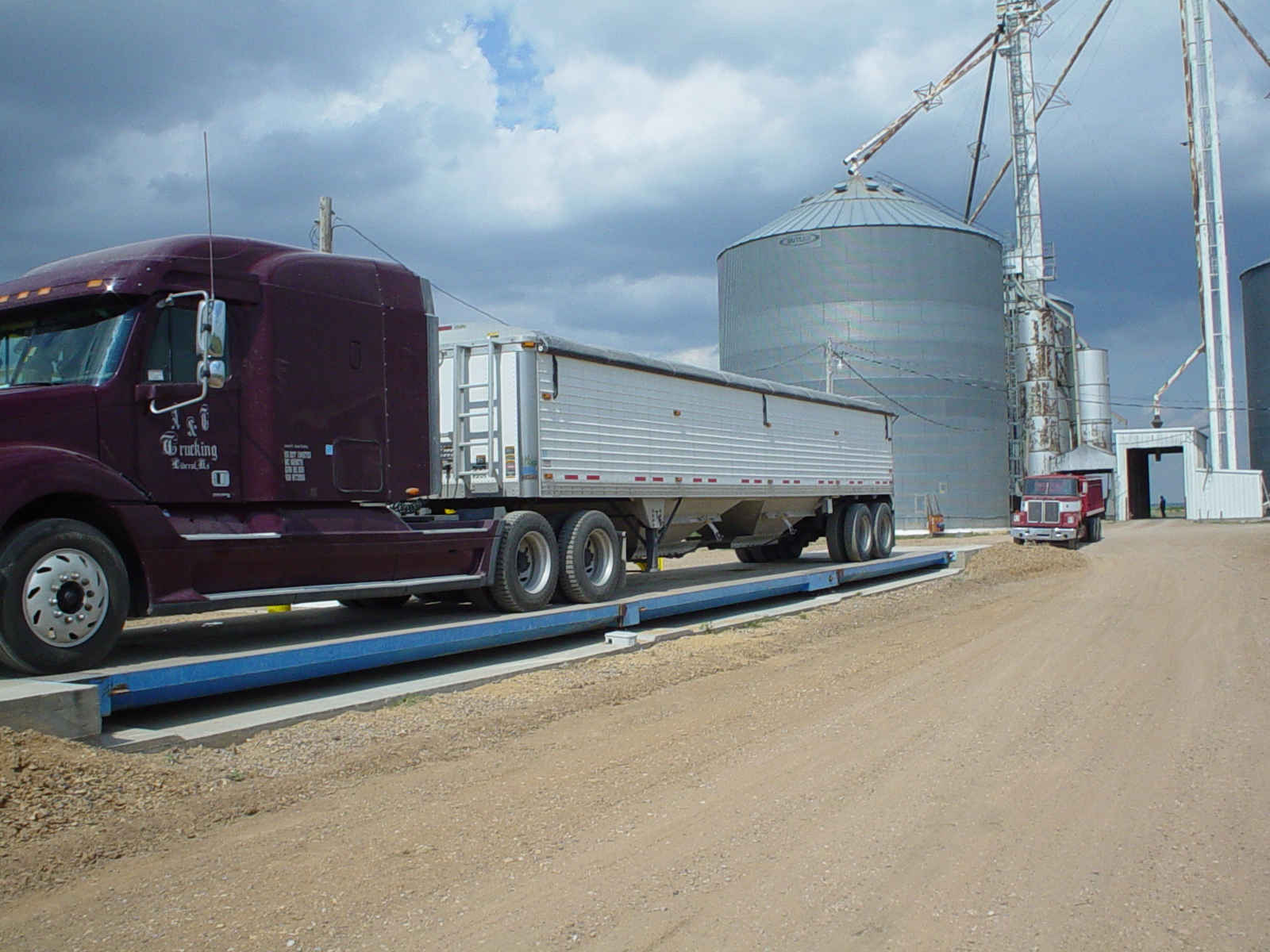
- Grain elevator at Floris during 2010 wheat harvest

- Location within the state of Oklahoma Floris, Oklahoma (the United States)
- Coordinates: 36°52′11″N 100°42′41″W
- Country: United States
- State: Oklahoma
- County: Beaver
- Elevation: 2,674 ft (815 m)
- Time zone: UTC-6 (Central (CST))
  - Summer (DST): UTC-5 (CDT)
- GNIS feature ID: 1100418

Floris is an unincorporated community in northwest Beaver County, Oklahoma, United States.

== History ==
The community was named after Floris Derthwick, who was the daughter of the townsite owner, Byron S. Derthwick.

The Floris post office operated from August 7, 1903 to September 30, 1925.

The Floris Grain Elevator, which was built along the tracks of the now-defunct Beaver, Meade and Englewood Railroad, is on the National Register of Historic Places listings in Beaver County, Oklahoma.
