= Floris Grain Elevator =

- U.S. National Register of Historic Places
- Location within Oklahoma Location within the United States
- Location: Off US 64, Floris, Oklahoma
- Coordinates: 36°52′13″N 100°42′28″W
- Area: less than one acre
- Built: 1900 or 1926
- MPS: Woodframe Grain Elevators of Oklahoma Panhandle TR
- NRHP reference No.: 83004159
- Added to NRHP: October 7, 1983

The Floris Grain Elevator, located off U.S. Route 64 in Floris, Oklahoma, was built in 1900 or 1926.

It handled over 350,000 bushels of wheat in its first year of operation. It is on the National Register of Historic Places listings in Beaver County, Oklahoma; it was deemed "significant because it is the only extant structure associated with the grain industry and the Beaver, Meade and Englewood Railroad in Floris, Oklahoma. It also served an important function in the agriculture, commerce, and economy of Floris."
