= U.S. Route 83 =

Highway in the United States

U.S. Route 83
- US 83 highlighted in red

Route information
- Length: 1,886 mi (3,035 km)
- Existed: 1926–present

Major junctions
- South end: Fed. 101 / Fed. 180 at the Mexican border in Brownsville, TX
- I-2 from Harlingen to La Joya, TX; I-35 from Laredo to Botines, TX; I-10 from Segovia to Junction, TX; I-20 in Abilene, TX; I-40 in Shamrock, TX; I-70 near Oakley, KS; I-80 in North Platte, NE; I-90 from Murdo to Vivian, SD; I-94 from Sterling to Bismarck, ND
- North end: PTH 83 at the Canadian border near Westhope, ND

Location
- Country: United States
- States: Texas, Oklahoma, Kansas, Nebraska, South Dakota, North Dakota

Highway system
- United States Numbered Highway System; List; Special; Divided
← US 82	→ US 84

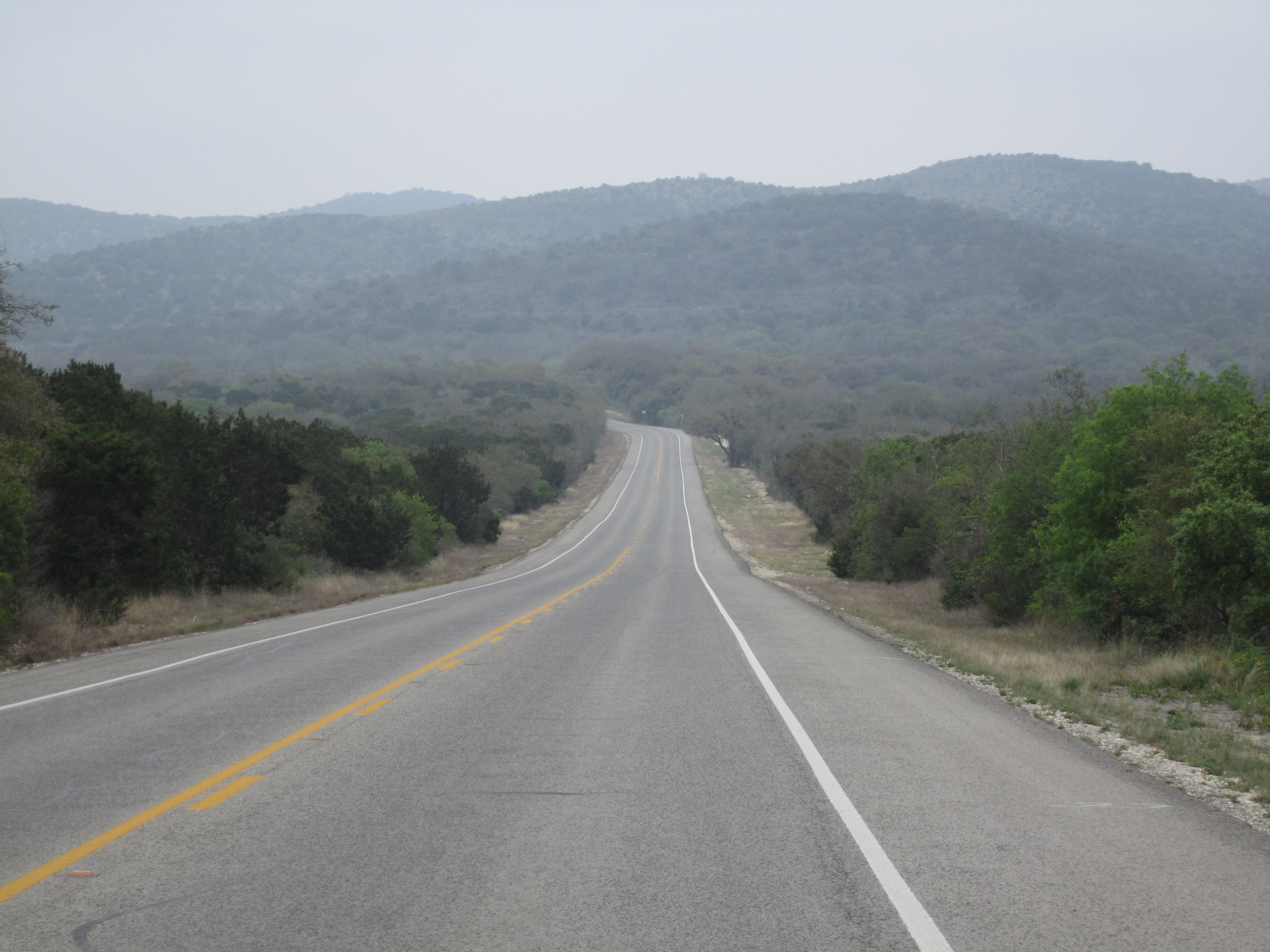
US 83 as it winds through the Texas Hill Country in Uvalde County, Texas

U.S. Route 83 (US 83) is a major north–south United States Numbered Highway that extends 1,885 miles (3,034 km) in the central United States. Only four other north–south routes are longer: US 1, US 41, US 59, and US 87, while US 83 follows a straighter north-south path than all of these. Nearly half of its mileage is in the state of Texas. The highway's northern terminus is north of Westhope, North Dakota, at the Canadian border, where it continues as Manitoba Highway 83 (PTH 83). The southern terminus is at the Veterans International Bridge in Brownsville, Texas. Together, US 83 and PTH 83 form a continuously numbered north-south highway with a combined distance of 3,450 kilometres (2,140 mi).

== Route description ==
=== Texas ===
US 83 is a largely north–south highway, 893 miles (1,437 km) in length, in Texas except for a segment parallel to the Rio Grande, where it takes an east–west course, much of which runs concurrently with Interstate 2 (I-2). It enters the United States and Texas near Brownsville concurrent with US 77 and then splits from US 77 at Harlingen. Passing Weslaco with I-2, it begins to veer northward and passes the current western terminus of I-2 at Peñitas (a new short roadway designated as Spur 83 forms a branch from Business US 83 to I-2), follows the Rio Grande to Laredo where it meets I-35 in a 18-mile (29 km) concurrency before heading northwestward. It meets I-10 at Junction, where it has a five-mile (8.0 km) concurrency with I-10, before heading almost due-north to Abilene, meeting I-20 on an expressway before heading north again on mostly undivided surface roads. It again heads slightly west of due north to meet US 287 in Childress and I-40 in Shamrock. About 5 1/2 miles (8.9 km) north of Perryton it leaves Texas and enters Oklahoma. Except for Abilene, Laredo, and some cities in the lower Rio Grande Valley it is largely rural in nature.

=== Oklahoma ===
US 83 traverses the Oklahoma panhandle along the western border of Beaver County, but in this brief 37-mile (60 km) stretch it encounters no fewer than three other federal highways. Approximately 10 miles (16 km) from the Texas line, US 83 intersects US 412 in the hamlet of Bryan's Corner. Continuing its journey northward, the highway crosses the Beaver River, then intersects US 64 in Turpin. US 83 north and US 64 east are co-signed for three northbound miles, where US 64 turns eastward. At this intersection, US 270 west joins the highway, and together with US 83 proceeds northbound for the final six miles (9.7 km) to the Kansas line.

=== Kansas ===
US 83 enters the Sunflower State in Seward County, approximately four miles (6.4 km) south of Liberal, where it intersects US 54 and US 270 ends. North of Liberal, US 83 begins a concurrency with US 160, and the highways remain joined until reaching Sublette, the seat of Haskell County. US 83 and US 160 split north of Sublette; US 160 heads west toward Ulysses, and US 83 continues north toward Garden City.

At Garden City, US 50 and US 400 join US 83 for a brief concurrency on a bypass around the east and north sides of the city while US 83 Business follows the former routing through downtown. All three routes cross K-156, also known as Kansas Avenue, in the northwest portion of the city. At the north end of the US 50/US 83 Business route, US 83 splits and heads north toward Scott City, while US 50 and US 400 remain joined through the rest of the state. The highway passes through largely unpopulated areas of Finney County and Scott County before reaching a junction with K-96 in downtown Scott City.

In northern Scott County, K-4 has its origins at US 83, heading east toward Healy, and US 83 traverses through rolling farmlands until reaching Oakley, the seat of Logan County. US 83 reaches US 40 less than a mile west of I-70, and the two highways jog west for a brief multiplex before US 83 splits and crosses I-70.

North of I-70, US 83 intersects US 24 then curves northeast, east of Gem in Thomas County. US 83 continues its northeasterly track through Rexford and Selden. After passing through Selden, US 83 intersects the southern terminus of K-383 and the northern terminus of K-23. From here, US 83 turns north, crosses into Decatur County then continues north and intersects US 36 in Oberlin. Oberlin is the last area of significant population the highway passes in Kansas; the next city is McCook, Nebraska.

=== Nebraska ===
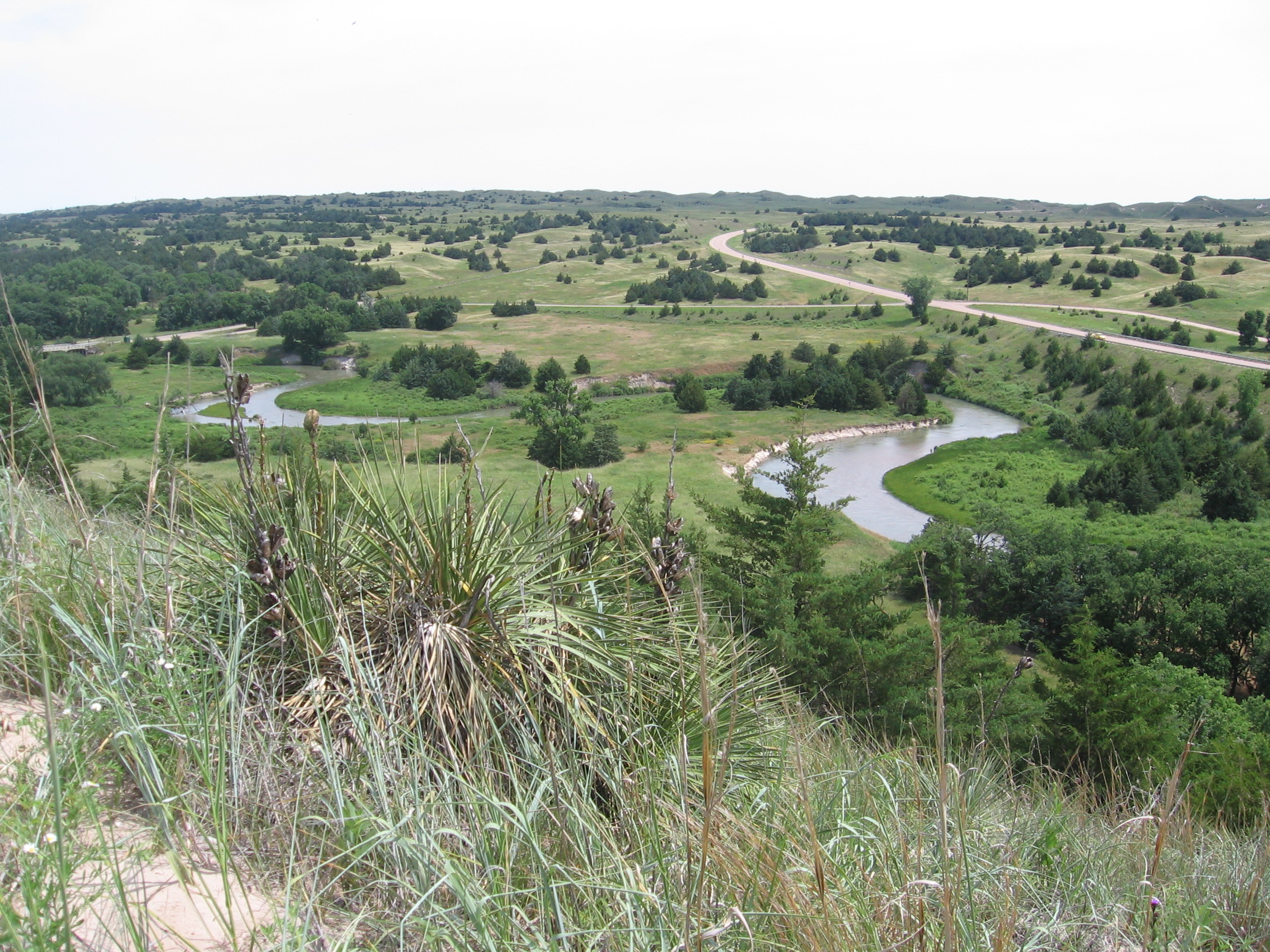
A view of the Dismal River, Nebraska Sandhills, and US 83 in Thomas County, Nebraska

US 83 enters Nebraska south of McCook, where it meets US 6 and US 34. It continues northward to North Platte, where it intersects I-80 and US 30. After leaving North Platte in a northeasterly direction, it turns north near Thedford and goes north through the Sand Hills to Valentine. For five miles (8.0 km) before Valentine, it runs concurrently with US 20. After passing through Valentine, it continues north to enter South Dakota. On its journey through Nebraska, the road "passes more cattle than people".

=== South Dakota ===
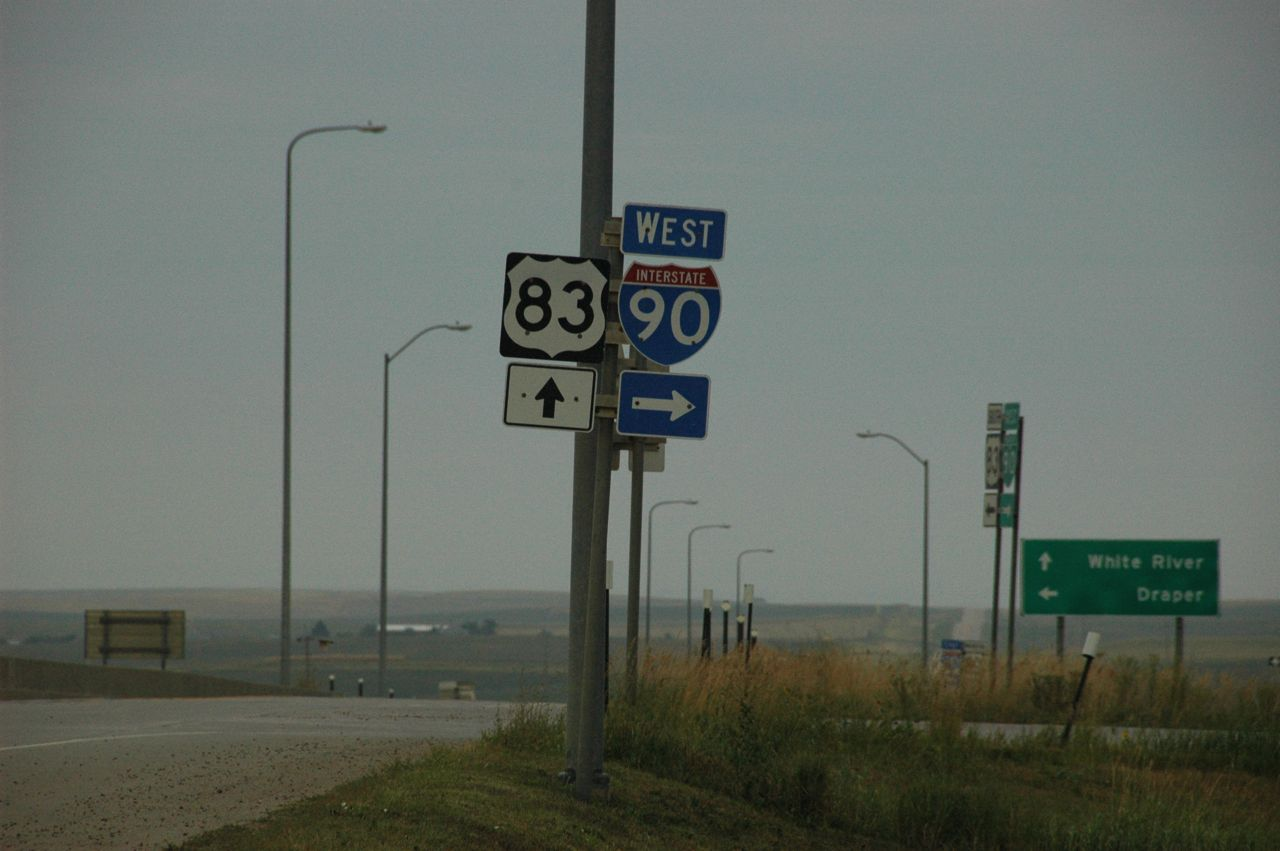
Looking south at the intersection of US 83 and I-90 in Murdo, South Dakota

US 83 enters South Dakota south of Olsonville on a segment of highway which passes through the Rosebud Indian Reservation. After a brief overlap with US 18 in Mission, the route turns north and meets I-90 at Murdo. The two routes overlap as US 83 goes east with I-90 until Vivian, where US 83 turns north. At Fort Pierre, US 83 meets US 14 and South Dakota Highway 34. The three highways overlap as they cross the Missouri River and enter Pierre. At Pierre, SD 34 separates and US 83 turns northeast with US 14. They separate near Blunt and US 83 turns northward. US 83 briefly overlaps with US 212 near Gettysburg and with US 12 through the Selby area. US 83 leaves South Dakota north of Herreid.

The South Dakota section of US 83, with the exception of concurrencies with US 18, I-90, US 14, US 212, and US 12, is defined at South Dakota Codified Laws § 31-4-180.

=== North Dakota ===
From South Dakota, US 83 enters North Dakota near the town of Hague, and runs northward for approximately 68 miles (109 km), serving the small cities of Strasburg and Linton before reaching Interstate 94. It follows I-94 west to Bismarck, where it resumes a generally northward course as a four-lane highway.

Headed toward Minot US 83 traverses mostly agricultural land, passing through the small cities of Wilton, Washburn, and Underwood north to Max. Leaving Underwood, US 83 encounters a large strip-mining coal (lignite) operation which can be seen from the roadway in the vicinity of Falkirk. North of Coleharbor, US 83 briefly merges both roadways and shares land with an adjacent railroad line in order to cross a viaduct that separates Lake Sakakawea from Lake Audubon. North of the lakes, the surroundings return to cropland and grazing land, with a wind farm located south of Minot.

The highway passes directly through central Minot as Broadway, the city's primary north-south thoroughfare, with the Minot Bypass to the west as an alternate route. After passing Minot Air Force Base, US 83 returns to a two-lane highway; approximately thirty miles (50 km) north of the base, it is co-signed with eastbound State Highway 5 for about ten miles (16 km). The highway then diverges from ND 5 to head north through Westhope to the Canadian border.

== Major intersections ==
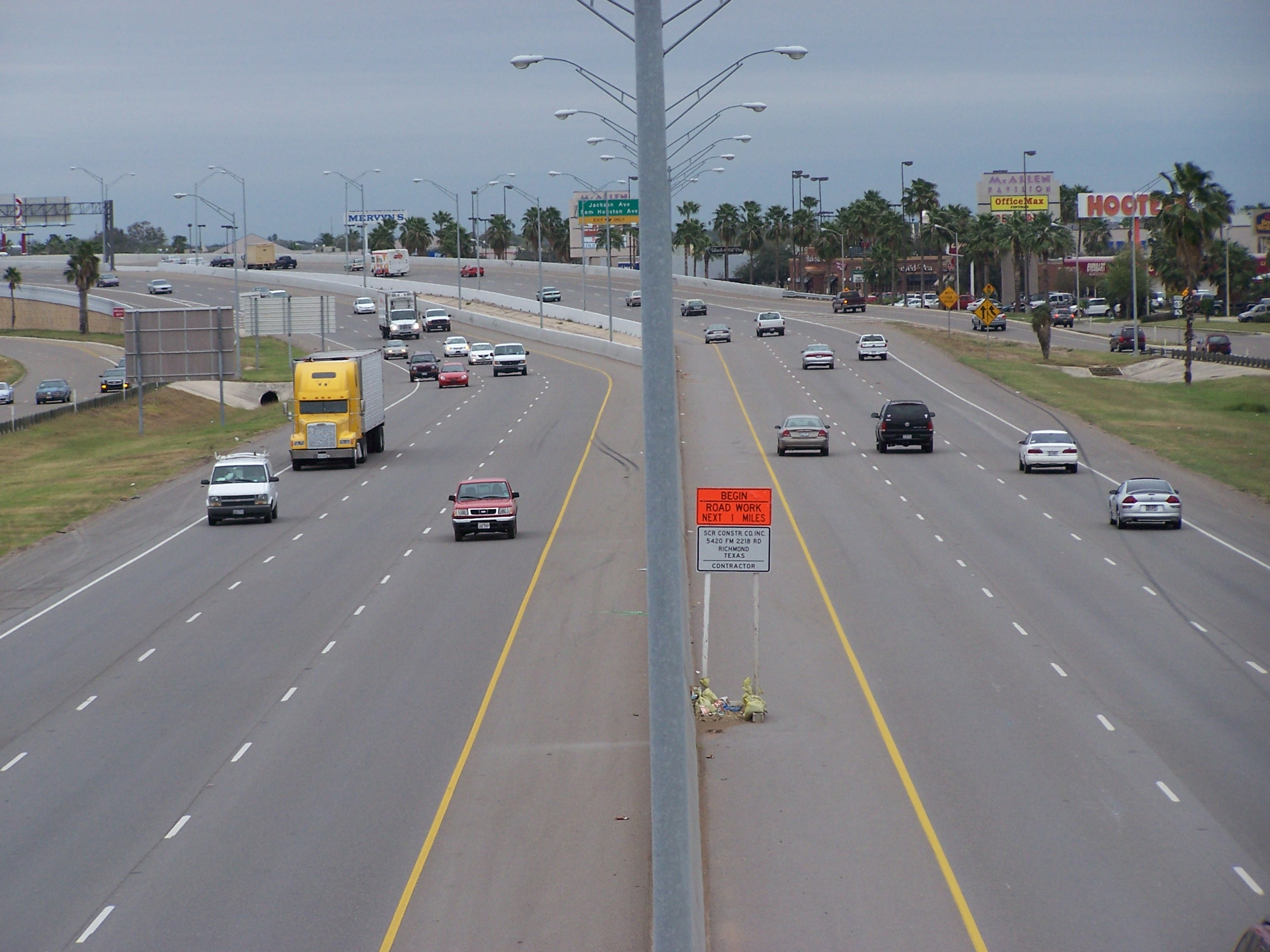
US 83 (along with I-2) traveling through a major retail district of McAllen, Texas.

Texas
I-69E / US 77 at the Veterans International Bridge at Los Tomates at the Mexico–United States border in Brownsville. The highways travel concurrently to Harlingen.
I-169 in Brownsville
I-2 / US 77 in Harlingen. I-2/US 83 travels concurrently to north of Abram-Perezville.
I-69C / US 281 in Pharr
I-35 in Laredo. The highways travel concurrently to Botines.
I-69W / US 59 in Laredo
US 277 in Carrizo Springs
US 57 in La Pryor
US 90 in Uvalde
I-10 northwest of Segovia. The highways travel concurrently to Junction.
I-10 / US 377 in Junction. US 83/US 377 travels concurrently to north of Junction.
US 190 in Menard. The highways travel concurrently to north of Menard.
US 87 in Eden
US 67 in Ballinger. The highways travel concurrently through Ballinger.
US 84 east-northeast of Tuscola. The highways travel concurrently to Abilene.
US 277 in Abilene. The highways travel concurrently to north of Anson.
I-20 in Abilene
US 180 in Anson
US 380 in Aspermont. The highways travel concurrently to north-northwest of Aspermont.
US 82 south of Guthrie
US 62 / US 70 in Paducah. US 62/US 83 travels concurrently to north of Childress.
US 287 in Childress
I-40 in Shamrock
US 60 south-southwest of Canadian. The highways travel concurrently to north-northeast of Canadian.
Oklahoma
US 412 in Bryan's Corner
US 64 south-southeast of Turpin. The highways travel concurrently to north of Turpin.
US 64 / US 270 north of Turpin. US 83/US 270 travels concurrently to Liberal, Kansas.
Kansas
US 54 / US 270 in Liberal
US 160 northwest of Kismet. The highways travel concurrently to north-northwest of Sublette.
US 56 southwest of Sublette
US 50 / US 400 in Garden City. The highways travel concurrently to north-northwest of Garden City.
US 40 in Oakley. The highways travel concurrently through Oakley.
I-70 north-northwest of Oakley
US 24 south-southeast of Gem
US 36 in Oberlin
Nebraska
US 6 / US 34 in McCook. The highways travel concurrently through McCook.
I-80 in North Platte
US 30 in North Platte
US 20 south-southeast of Valentine. The highways travel concurrently to Valentine.
South Dakota
US 18 in Mission. The highways travel concurrently to west-southwest of Mission.
I-90 southeast of Murdo. The highways travel concurrently to southwest of Vivian.
US 14 in Fort Pierre. The highways travel concurrently to west-southwest of Blunt
US 212 west of Gettysburg. The highways travel concurrently for approximately 0.9 miles (1.4 km).
US 12 south of Selby. The highways travel concurrently to north-northwest of Selby.
North Dakota
I-94 in Sterling. The highways travel concurrently to Bismarck.
US 2 / US 52 in Minot
PTH 83 at the Canada–United States border north of Westhope

== See also ==
- U.S. Route 183
- U.S. Route 283
- U.S. Route 383 (former)
- Manitoba Highway 83

Browse numbered routes
← SH-82	OK	→ SH-83
← K-82	KS	→ K-84
← US 81	NE	→ N-84
← US 81	SD	→ US 85
