= Gate, Oklahoma =

Town in Oklahoma, US

- Town
- Location in Beaver County and state of Oklahoma.
- Coordinates: 36°51′06″N 100°03′19″W
- Country: United States
- State: Oklahoma
- County: Beaver

Area
  - Total: 0.25 sq mi (0.65 km^{2})
  - Land: 0.25 sq mi (0.65 km^{2})
  - Water: 0 sq mi (0.00 km^{2})
- Elevation: 2,264 ft (690 m)

Population (2020)
  - Total: 60
  - Density: 238.2/sq mi (91.96/km^{2})
- Time zone: UTC-6 (Central (CST))
  - Summer (DST): UTC-5 (CDT)
- ZIP code: 73844
- Area code: 580
- FIPS code: 40-28800
- GNIS feature ID: 2412673

Gate is a town in Beaver County, Oklahoma, United States. The population was 60 at the time of the 2020 census. The community was named for the fact it was the "gateway" to a ranching area.

== History ==
=== Hangman's Tree ===
The area was a part of "No Man's Land" or the Oklahoma Panhandle, where no laws from other states could reach. Outlaws could commit crimes in Kansas or Texas, ride across the border and live protected from the laws. Violence, claim jumping, and thieving forced the honest settlers to form vigilance committees. Gate and Neutral City (located approximately five miles west) had carved a niche in badman history with hot lead. Low regard for property and human life was rampant across this lawless land. Between Gate and Neutral City (the most wicked towns in No Man's Land), three trees grew, one of which had a low hanging branch. This branch was used in rendering the "hanging" punishment. The tree measured 15 ft. in circumference, is approximately 40 ft. tall, There is no record of how many were hanged on the tree but one man said he witnessed three of them at once. The accused was in place with a rope around his neck when one of the men drew a line in the sand with the heel of his boot stating "If anyone objects let him step across the line." One man by the name of G. C. (Nease Maphet) stepped across the line.

=== Silica mine ===
Volcanic ash is believed by geologists to have come from a volcano in north-central New Mexico. During the volcanic age, immense quantities of materials were thrown out of these volcanoes and the ash or dust was carried by the prevailing winds and collected in depressions or drifts in the same manner that snow does. There is evidence in the deposits that settled here that the ash settled into a lake, which accounts for the uniform quality of the main deposits, which became a hill. A canyon cut through the center of the deposit and exposed the deposit as cliffs. According to a certified analysis the Gate deposit is composed of 73% silica, 14% alumina and smaller amounts of iron, calcium, magnesium and alkalis.

=== Indian Battle ===
The hills on the south side are where the cavalry took their stand. Buttons from uniforms and shells they used have been found there. One man told about the battle he was a part of that drove the renegade of Indians back to the reservation they were assigned.

=== Old Gate ===
In 1886, with the establishment of a post office, Gate City came to being. In 1894, an application was filed to move the post office for the third time. It was moved 113 rods southeast, to where several business were established and the name was changed to just Gate. Here Gate grew until the railroad came, in 1910. By this time Gate had two livery stables, a hotel, barber shop, pool hall, harness shop, grocery, real estate, hardware stores, bank, doctor's office and drug store, Masonic hall, numerous churches, furniture store, funeral home, bakery, U.S. Land office, millinery shop, lumber yard, two black smiths and a feed mill. When the railroad bypassed the town, the businessmen moved the town to the railroad, the present site of Gate.

== Geography ==
According to the United States Census Bureau, the town has a total area of 0.2 square miles (0.52 km^{2}), all land.

=== Climate ===
Climate data for Gate, Oklahoma (1991–2020 normals, extremes 1959–present)
Month	Jan	Feb	Mar	Apr	May	Jun	Jul	Aug	Sep	Oct	Nov	Dec	Year
Record high °F (°C)	85 (29)	92 (33)	104 (40)	102 (39)	105 (41)	113 (45)	112 (44)	110 (43)	109 (43)	102 (39)	92 (33)	84 (29)	113 (45)
Mean daily maximum °F (°C)	47.8 (8.8)	51.1 (10.6)	61.2 (16.2)	69.7 (20.9)	79.0 (26.1)	88.4 (31.3)	93.8 (34.3)	92.0 (33.3)	84.3 (29.1)	72.2 (22.3)	59.3 (15.2)	48.2 (9.0)	70.6 (21.4)
Daily mean °F (°C)	34.8 (1.6)	38.1 (3.4)	47.6 (8.7)	56.2 (13.4)	66.4 (19.1)	76.2 (24.6)	81.1 (27.3)	79.4 (26.3)	71.2 (21.8)	58.6 (14.8)	46.0 (7.8)	36.0 (2.2)	57.6 (14.2)
Mean daily minimum °F (°C)	21.7 (−5.7)	25.0 (−3.9)	33.9 (1.1)	42.7 (5.9)	53.9 (12.2)	63.9 (17.7)	68.5 (20.3)	66.9 (19.4)	58.1 (14.5)	45.0 (7.2)	32.8 (0.4)	23.7 (−4.6)	44.7 (7.1)
Record low °F (°C)	−25 (−32)	−15 (−26)	−14 (−26)	16 (−9)	24 (−4)	41 (5)	50 (10)	48 (9)	31 (−1)	12 (−11)	5 (−15)	−13 (−25)	−25 (−32)
Average precipitation inches (mm)	0.80 (20)	0.72 (18)	1.66 (42)	2.00 (51)	2.50 (64)	3.50 (89)	2.57 (65)	3.05 (77)	1.49 (38)	2.15 (55)	0.94 (24)	1.25 (32)	22.63 (575)
Average snowfall inches (cm)	3.0 (7.6)	3.2 (8.1)	4.3 (11)	0.7 (1.8)	0.0 (0.0)	0.0 (0.0)	0.0 (0.0)	0.0 (0.0)	0.0 (0.0)	0.5 (1.3)	1.3 (3.3)	4.6 (12)	17.6 (45)
Average precipitation days (≥ 0.01 in)	3.5	3.6	5.0	5.8	7.0	7.7	6.0	7.0	4.7	5.2	3.1	3.8	62.4
Average snowy days (≥ 0.1 in)	2.3	1.6	1.4	0.4	0.0	0.0	0.0	0.0	0.0	0.3	0.6	1.8	8.4
Source: NOAA

== Demographics ==
Historical population
Census	Pop.	Note	%±
1910	958		—
1920	309		−67.7%
1930	307		−0.6%
1940	243		−20.8%
1950	197		−18.9%
1960	130		−34.0%
1970	151		16.2%
1980	146		−3.3%
1990	159		8.9%
2000	112		−29.6%
2010	93		−17.0%
2020	60		−35.5%
U.S. Decennial Census

=== 2020 census ===
As of the 2020 census, Gate had a population of 60. The median age was 50.3 years. 16.7% of residents were under the age of 18 and 26.7% of residents were 65 years of age or older. For every 100 females there were 81.8 males, and for every 100 females age 18 and over there were 78.6 males age 18 and over.

0.0% of residents lived in urban areas, while 100.0% lived in rural areas.

There were 33 households in Gate, of which 30.3% had children under the age of 18 living in them. Of all households, 36.4% were married-couple households, 24.2% were households with a male householder and no spouse or partner present, and 39.4% were households with a female householder and no spouse or partner present. About 39.4% of all households were made up of individuals and 18.2% had someone living alone who was 65 years of age or older.

There were 46 housing units, of which 28.3% were vacant. The homeowner vacancy rate was 0.0% and the rental vacancy rate was 30.0%.

Racial composition as of the 2020 census
Race	Number	Percent
White	44	73.3%
Black or African American	0	0.0%
American Indian and Alaska Native	1	1.7%
Asian	0	0.0%
Native Hawaiian and Other Pacific Islander	0	0.0%
Some other race	7	11.7%
Two or more races	8	13.3%
Hispanic or Latino (of any race)	16	26.7%

=== 2000 census ===
As of the census of 2000, there were 112 people, 47 households, and 33 families residing in Gate. The population density was 443.8 inhabitants per square mile (171.4/km^{2}). There were 61 housing units at an average density of 241.7 per square mile (93.3/km^{2}). The racial makeup of Gate was 98.21% White and 1.79% Native American. Hispanic or Latino of any race were 4.46% of the population.

There were 47 households, out of which 36.2% had children under the age of 18 living with them, 68.1% were married couples living together, and 27.7% were non-families. 27.7% of all households were made up of individuals, and 12.8% had someone living alone who was 65 years of age or older. The average household size was 2.38 and the average family size was 2.82.

In Gate, the population was spread out, with 24.1% under the age of 18, 8.0% from 18 to 24, 24.1% from 25 to 44, 27.7% from 45 to 64, and 16.1% who were 65 years of age or older. The median age was 40 years. For every 100 females, there were 103.6 males. For every 100 females age 18 and over, there were 97.7 males.

The median income for a household in Gate was $34,583, and the median income for a family was $45,000. Males had a median income of $31,563 versus $20,938 for females. The per capita income for the town was $18,891. There were 4.2% of families and 5.1% of the population living below the poverty line, including none of those under 18 or over 64.

== Education ==
Gate is in the Laverne Public Schools school district.
