= Forgan, Oklahoma =

Town in Oklahoma, US

- Town
- Location in Beaver County and state of Oklahoma.
- Coordinates: 36°54′25″N 100°32′17″W
- Country: United States
- State: Oklahoma
- County: Beaver

Area
  - Total: 0.39 sq mi (1.02 km^{2})
  - Land: 0.39 sq mi (1.02 km^{2})
  - Water: 0 sq mi (0.00 km^{2})
- Elevation: 2,585 ft (788 m)

Population (2020)
  - Total: 450
  - Density: 1,144.4/sq mi (441.87/km^{2})
- Time zone: UTC-6 (Central (CST))
  - Summer (DST): UTC-5 (CDT)
- ZIP code: 73938
- Area code: 580
- FIPS code: 40-26900
- GNIS feature ID: 2412637

Forgan is a town in Beaver County, Oklahoma, United States. As of the 2020 census, the town’s population was 450.

== History ==
The town name honors James B. Forgan, a Chicago banker and financier. L. B. Tooker established the first newspaper, the Forgan Enterprise, on June 6, 1912. A total of 53 businesses and four medical doctors were in the town at that time. As the town was located in a wheat-producing area, grain elevators were built to store wheat prior to shipment. The population dropped to 428 in 1940 after an exodus due to the Dust Bowl.

At the turn of the 21st century the economy was based on wheat and milo farming, ranching, the oil and gas industry, and corporate hog farms.

== Geography ==
Forgan lies between the Cimarron and Beaver rivers. According to the United States Census Bureau, the town has a total area of 0.4 square miles (1.0 km^{2}), all land.

== Demographics ==
Historical population
Census	Pop.	Note	%±
1920	582		—
1930	605		4.0%
1940	428		−29.3%
1950	410		−4.2%
1960	532		29.8%
1970	496		−6.8%
1980	611		23.2%
1990	489		−20.0%
2000	532		8.8%
2010	547		2.8%
2020	450		−17.7%
U.S. Decennial Census

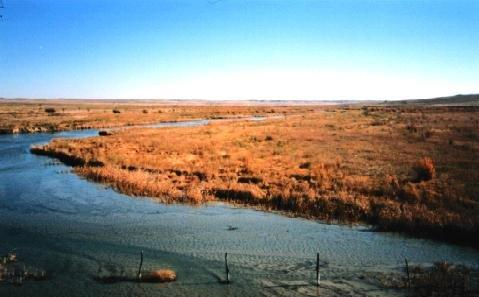
Cimarron River, near Forgan, Oklahoma

=== 2020 census ===
As of the 2020 census, Forgan had a population of 450. The median age was 43.7 years. 24.7% of residents were under the age of 18 and 22.4% of residents were 65 years of age or older. For every 100 females there were 100.9 males, and for every 100 females age 18 and over there were 87.3 males age 18 and over.

0.0% of residents lived in urban areas, while 100.0% lived in rural areas.

There were 181 households in Forgan, of which 38.7% had children under the age of 18 living in them. Of all households, 60.8% were married-couple households, 13.3% were households with a male householder and no spouse or partner present, and 21.0% were households with a female householder and no spouse or partner present. About 15.5% of all households were made up of individuals and 8.8% had someone living alone who was 65 years of age or older.

There were 224 housing units, of which 19.2% were vacant. The homeowner vacancy rate was 0.6% and the rental vacancy rate was 18.4%.

Racial composition as of the 2020 census
Race	Number	Percent
White	392	87.1%
Black or African American	0	0.0%
American Indian and Alaska Native	2	0.4%
Asian	0	0.0%
Native Hawaiian and Other Pacific Islander	1	0.2%
Some other race	27	6.0%
Two or more races	28	6.2%
Hispanic or Latino (of any race)	106	23.6%

=== 2010 census ===
As of the 2010 United States census, there were 547 people living in Forgan. The population density was 1,400 inhabitants per square mile (540/km^{2}). There were 239 housing units at an average density of 645 per square mile (249/km^{2}). The racial makeup of the town was 89.47% White, 0.19% Native American, 0.38% Asian, 6.77% from other races, and 3.20% from two or more races. Hispanic or Latino of any race were 14.10% of the population.

There were 197 households in Forgan, out of which 37.1% had children under the age of 18 living with them, 57.9% were married couples living together, 12.2% had a female householder with no husband present, and 27.4% were non-families. 25.4% of all households were made up of individuals, and 16.2% had someone living alone who was 65 years of age or older. The average household size was 2.70 and the average family size was 3.22.

In Forgan, the population was spread out, with 33.3% under the age of 18, 6.4% from 18 to 24, 27.8% from 25 to 44, 21.4% from 45 to 64, and 11.1% who were 65 years of age or older. The median age was 33 years. For every 100 females, there were 96.3 males. For every 100 females age 18 and over, there were 87.8 males.

The median income for a household in Forgan was $26,739, and the median income for a family was $29,167. Males had a median income of $25,000 versus $18,409 for females. The per capita income for the town was $13,250. About 17.6% of families and 17.9% of the population were below the poverty line, including 24.4% of those under age 18 and 7.1% of those age 65 or over.

== Education ==
It is in the Forgan Public Schools school district.
