= Knowles Grain Elevator =

- U.S. National Register of Historic Places
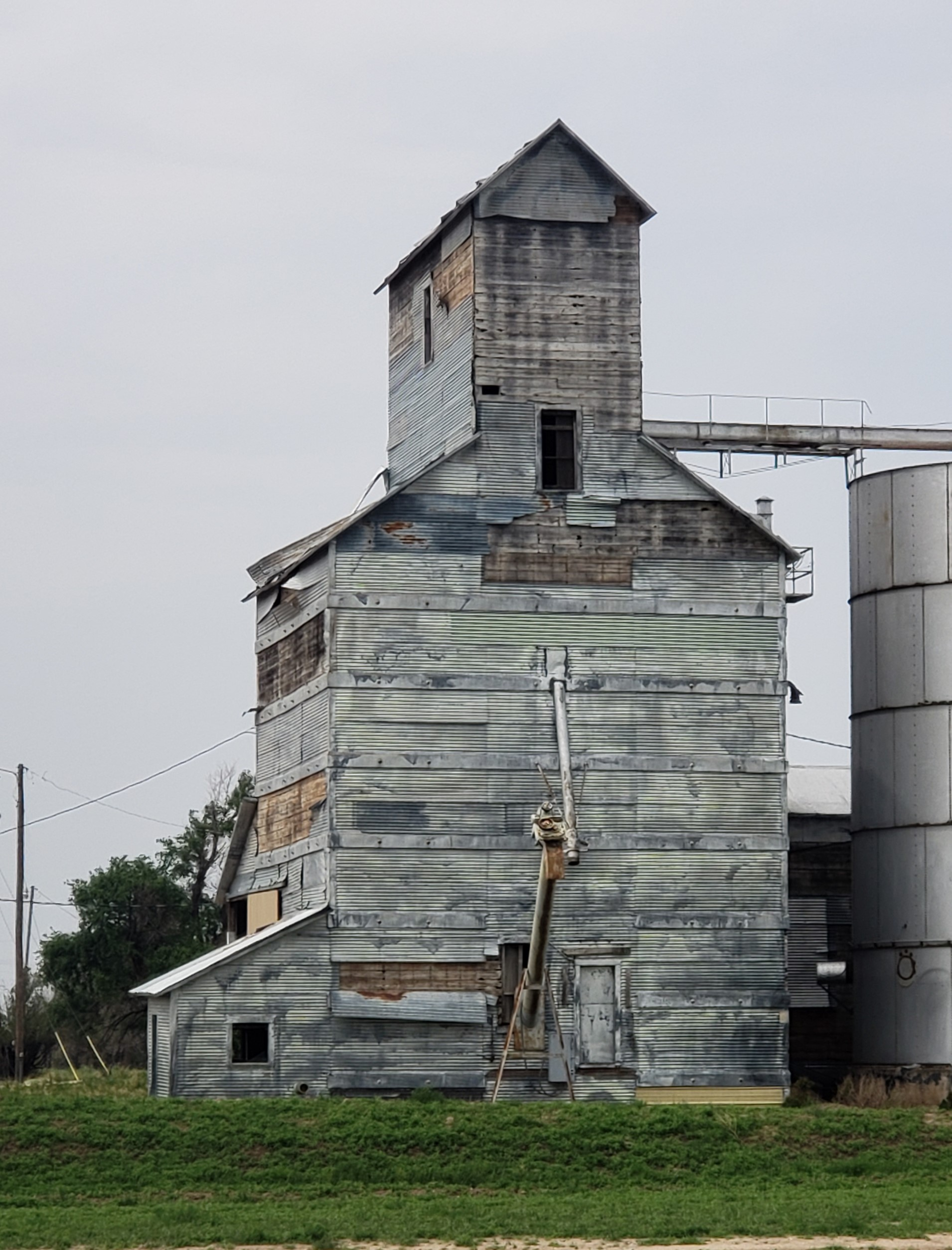

- Location within Oklahoma
- Location: U.S. 64, Knowles, Oklahoma
- Coordinates: 36°52′28″N 100°11′30″W
- Area: less than one acre
- Built: 1913
- MPS: Woodframe Grain Elevators of Oklahoma Panhandle TR
- NRHP reference No.: 83002069
- Added to NRHP: May 13, 1983

The Knowles Grain Elevator, located on U.S. Route 64 in Knowles, Oklahoma, was built in 1913. It was listed on the National Register of Historic Places in 1983.

It is a wood-framed structure covered by corrugated metal. It was deemed significant as "the only remaining structure associated with the grain industry and the Wichita Falls and Northwestern Railroad, which was taken over by the Missouri-Kansas-Texas Railroad (KATY) in the 1920s. It was an integral part of the agriculture, commerce, and economy of Knowles. The Knowles Elevator is the sole survivor of the three elevators built in 1913 by the Sappington Grain Company."

== See also ==
- Turpin Grain Elevator, also NRHP-listed in Beaver County
