= Turpin Grain Elevator =

- U.S. National Register of Historic Places
- Location within Oklahoma
- Location: Off U.S. 64, Turpin, Oklahoma
- Coordinates: 36°52′45″N 100°52′35″W
- Area: less than one acre
- Built: 1925
- Built by: Light, Charles M.
- MPS: Woodframe Grain Elevators of Oklahoma Panhandle TR
- NRHP reference No.: 83002071
- Added to NRHP: May 13, 1983

The Turpin Grain Elevator, located off U.S. Route 64 in Turpin, Oklahoma, was built in 1925. It was listed on the National Register of Historic Places in 1983.

It is a wood-frame structure covered by corrugated metal. It was built by the Light Grain and Milling Company in 1925, on the first building lot in the new town of Turpin, established by arrival of the Beaver, Meade and Englewood Railroad. It was in use into the late 1960s.

== See also ==
- Knowles Grain Elevator, also NRHP-listed in Beaver County
