= Turpin, Oklahoma =

Unincorporated community in Oklahoma, US

- Census-designated place
- Location in Beaver County and state of Oklahoma.
- Coordinates: 36°52′14″N 100°52′57″W
- Country: United States
- State: Oklahoma
- County: Beaver

Area
  - Total: 1.00 sq mi (2.59 km^{2})
  - Land: 1.00 sq mi (2.59 km^{2})
  - Water: 0 sq mi (0.00 km^{2})
- Elevation: 2,753 ft (839 m)

Population (2020)
  - Total: 442
  - Density: 442.3/sq mi (170.77/km^{2})
- Time zone: UTC-6 (Central (CST))
  - Summer (DST): UTC-5 (CDT)
- ZIP code: 73950
- FIPS code: 40-75200
- GNIS feature ID: 2629938

Turpin is a small unincorporated community and census-designated place in Beaver County, Oklahoma, United States. The post office was established April 8, 1925. The population was 442 at the time of the 2020 census.

== History ==
Turpin was named for Carl Julian Turpin, a son of Thomas James Turpin and Elmanda (Kennerly) Turpin. Carl was born on 10 Aug 1871 in Quantico, Wicomico County, Maryland. He died 20 Nov 1942 in Oklahoma City.

Carl J. Turpin was the general manager of the Beaver, Meade and Englewood Railroad (BM&E). In 1918, two farmers from Hardtner, Kansas, Jacob Achenbach and Ira B. Blackstock, requested his assistance. Messrs. Achenbach and Blackstock had been asked by farmers in Beaver County and the surrounding areas to build a railroad through the Panhandle so that their wheat crops could be shipped to outlying markets. Achenbach and Blackstock knew how to build the railroad, but they needed someone to manage it. That is where Carl Julian Turpin came in. Turpin had ample experience as a railroad man, his career beginning in 1888.

Described as a "by the book" type of general manager, Turpin was a stern, well-groomed man. He worked without salary. However, between 1918 and 1926, Turpin did receive stock in the line. At its height, the BM&E ran from Beaver, Oklahoma through Turpin and Eva, Oklahoma and continuing to a connection with the Santa Fe Railroad in Keyes, Oklahoma. The line connected with the Katy at Forgan and the Rock Island at Hooker. The BM&E was eventually sold to Missouri-Kansas-Texas Railroad (M-K-T or Katy) in 1931.

"When I was a kid 20 years old, but married, I used to want to work for a railroad which paid $50 a month and furnished its agents a two-story house on the line, rent, brooms, and matches free. Maybe I still could find something like that," Turpin said, after the sale of the BM&E. The railway was eventually abandoned in 1972.

=== General ===
Turpin centers around its independent school district. It consists of a multi-building K-12 facility that draws its student body from surrounding farms and the housing communities of Little Ponderosa and Pheasant Run. This in turn means that, while Turpin is smaller than the surrounding communities of Beaver, Forgan, Hooker, and Tyrone, it has a comparatively large student body.

Turpin's school is the largest employer in the community, and the hub for community activities. Turpin comes to life between summers, beginning with football and basketball in the fall and ending with track, softball, and baseball in the spring. Turpin High School is recognized for its athletic success in class A winning championships in football, track, and golf. Notable alumni include former Dallas Cowboys defensive back Lynn Scott and author James Stoddard.

The podcast, Gone Ramblin, was started by two Turpin alumni that examines life in the Oklahoma Panhandle.

The Turpin Grain Elevator was situated on the BM&E's line, and is now on the National Register of Historic Places listings in Beaver County, Oklahoma.

== Demographics ==
Historical population
Census	Pop.	Note	%±
2010	467		—
2020	442		−5.4%
U.S. Decennial Census

=== 2020 census ===
As of the 2020 census, Turpin had a population of 442. The median age was 35.2 years. 33.0% of residents were under the age of 18 and 13.1% of residents were 65 years of age or older. For every 100 females there were 100.9 males, and for every 100 females age 18 and over there were 102.7 males age 18 and over.

0.0% of residents lived in urban areas, while 100.0% lived in rural areas.

There were 154 households in Turpin, of which 26.6% had children under the age of 18 living in them. Of all households, 59.7% were married-couple households, 16.2% were households with a male householder and no spouse or partner present, and 20.1% were households with a female householder and no spouse or partner present. About 14.9% of all households were made up of individuals and 5.8% had someone living alone who was 65 years of age or older.

There were 186 housing units, of which 17.2% were vacant. The homeowner vacancy rate was 0.0% and the rental vacancy rate was 4.0%.

=== Racial and ethnic composition ===
Racial composition as of the 2020 census
Race	Number	Percent
White	319	72.2%
Black or African American	0	0.0%
American Indian and Alaska Native	4	0.9%
Asian	0	0.0%
Native Hawaiian and Other Pacific Islander	0	0.0%
Some other race	68	15.4%
Two or more races	51	11.5%
Hispanic or Latino (of any race)	108	24.4%

=== 2010 census ===
At the 2010 United States census the population of Turpin was 467.

== Education ==
Turpin is in the Turpin Public Schools school district.
