= List of left-handed quarterbacks =

List of professional/college gridiron football quarterbacks

This is a list of notable left-handed quarterbacks who have played professionally or for a major college program. In gridiron football, quarterbacks have been predominantly right-handed; only 33 left-handed quarterbacks have appeared in the National Football League (NFL). 12 others were drafted, but never played in the league. The rarity of left-handed NFL quarterbacks has been a topic of discussion and debate among players, coaches, and analysts.

Left-handed quarterbacks were relatively prominent in the NFL between the 1970s and the 2000s, but became mostly absent from the league after 2010. The most successful have been Pro Football Hall of Fame inductees Steve Young and Ken Stabler, Most Valuable Player winner Boomer Esiason, and Pro Bowl selections Frankie Albert, Mark Brunell, and Michael Vick. As of 2026, Tua Tagovailoa, Michael Penix Jr., Dillon Gabriel, and Cole Payton are the NFL's only left-handed quarterbacks, with only Penix holding a starting position.

== List ==
Key
^	Inducted into the Pro Football Hall of Fame

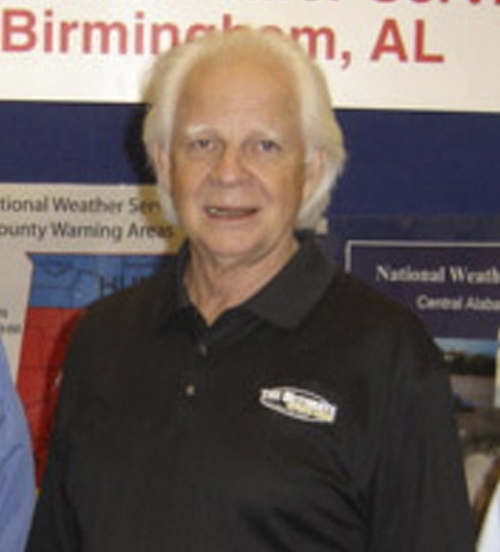
Ken Stabler was the first left-handed quarterback to be named Most Valuable Player and win a Super Bowl

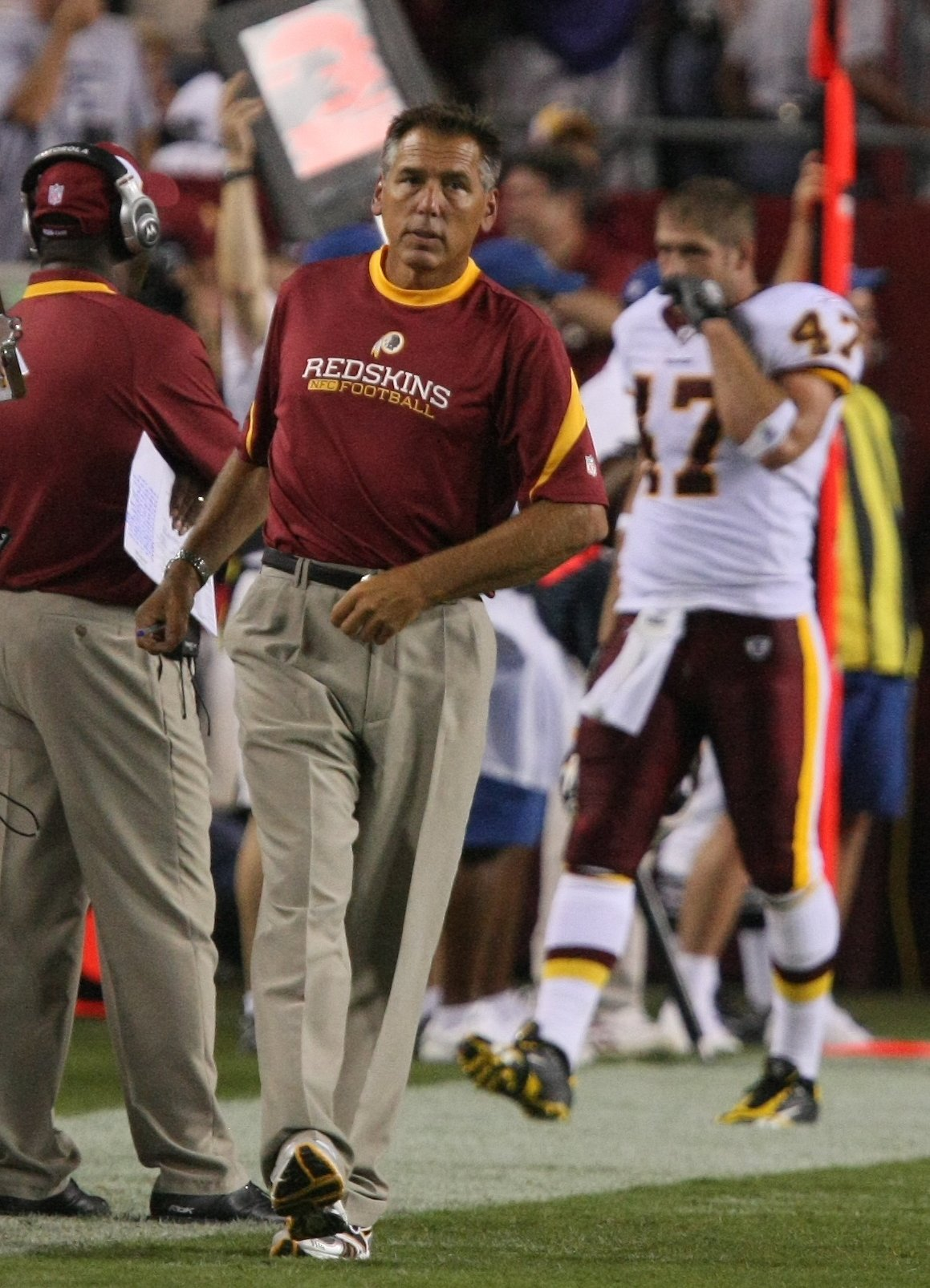
Prior to his coaching career, Jim Zorn was the original quarterback of the Seattle Seahawks

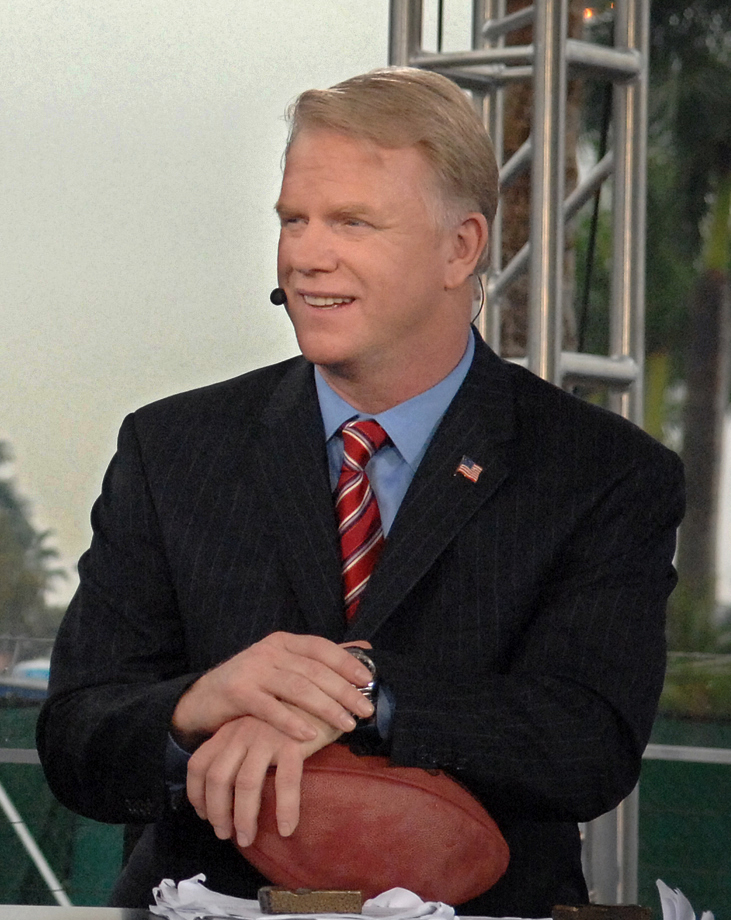
Boomer Esiason was named Most Valuable Player in 1988 en route to a Super Bowl XXIII appearance

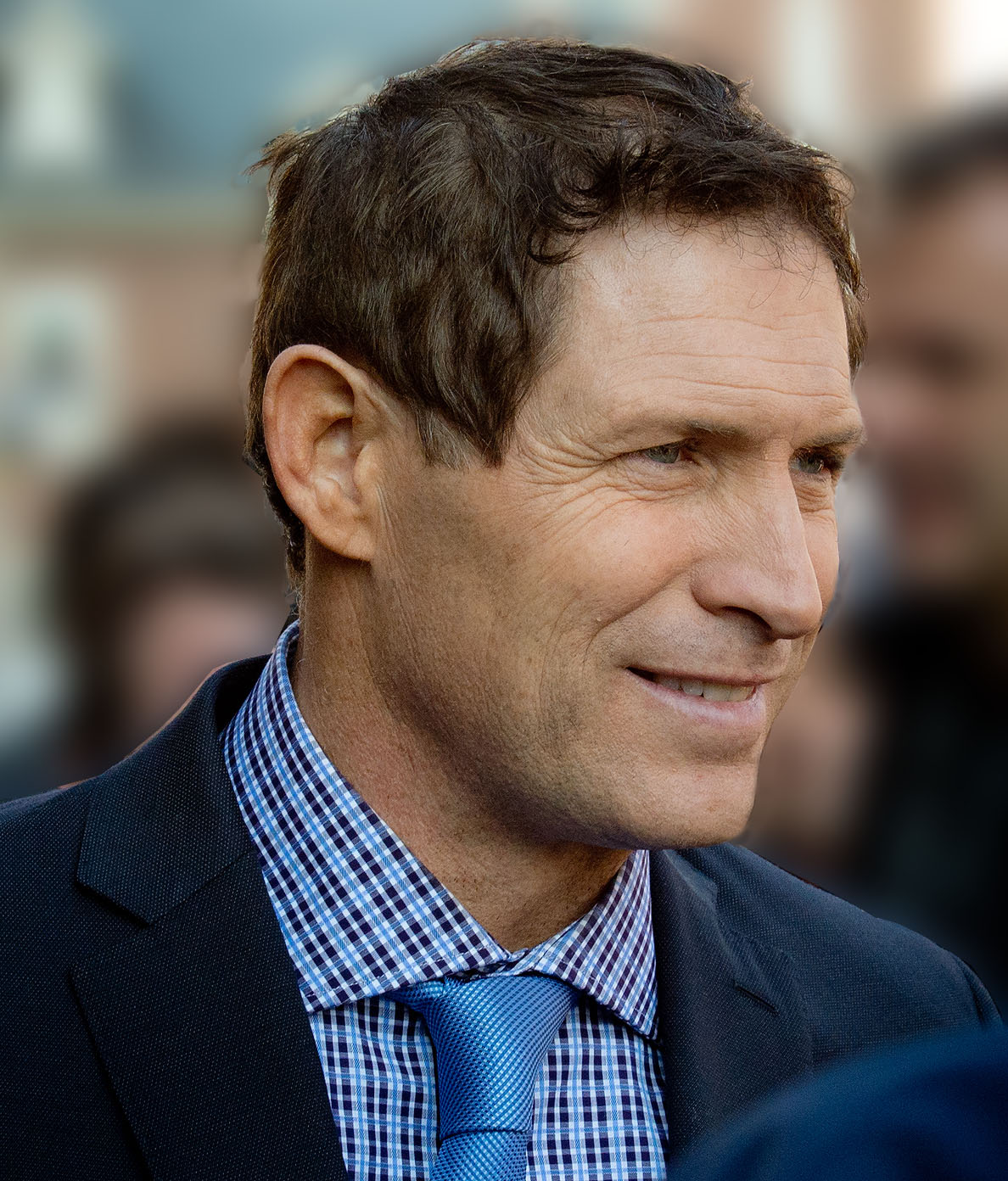
Considered the greatest left-handed quarterback of all time, Steve Young was the first inducted to the Pro Football Hall of Fame

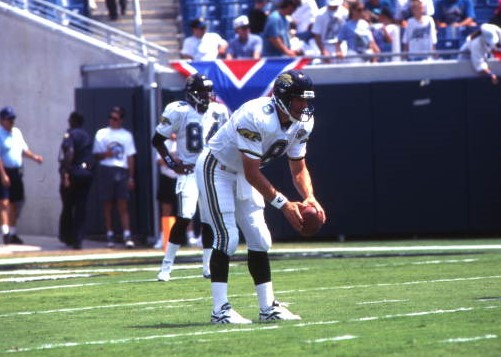
Mark Brunell led the Jacksonville Jaguars to four consecutive playoff runs and two AFC Championship Games in their first five seasons

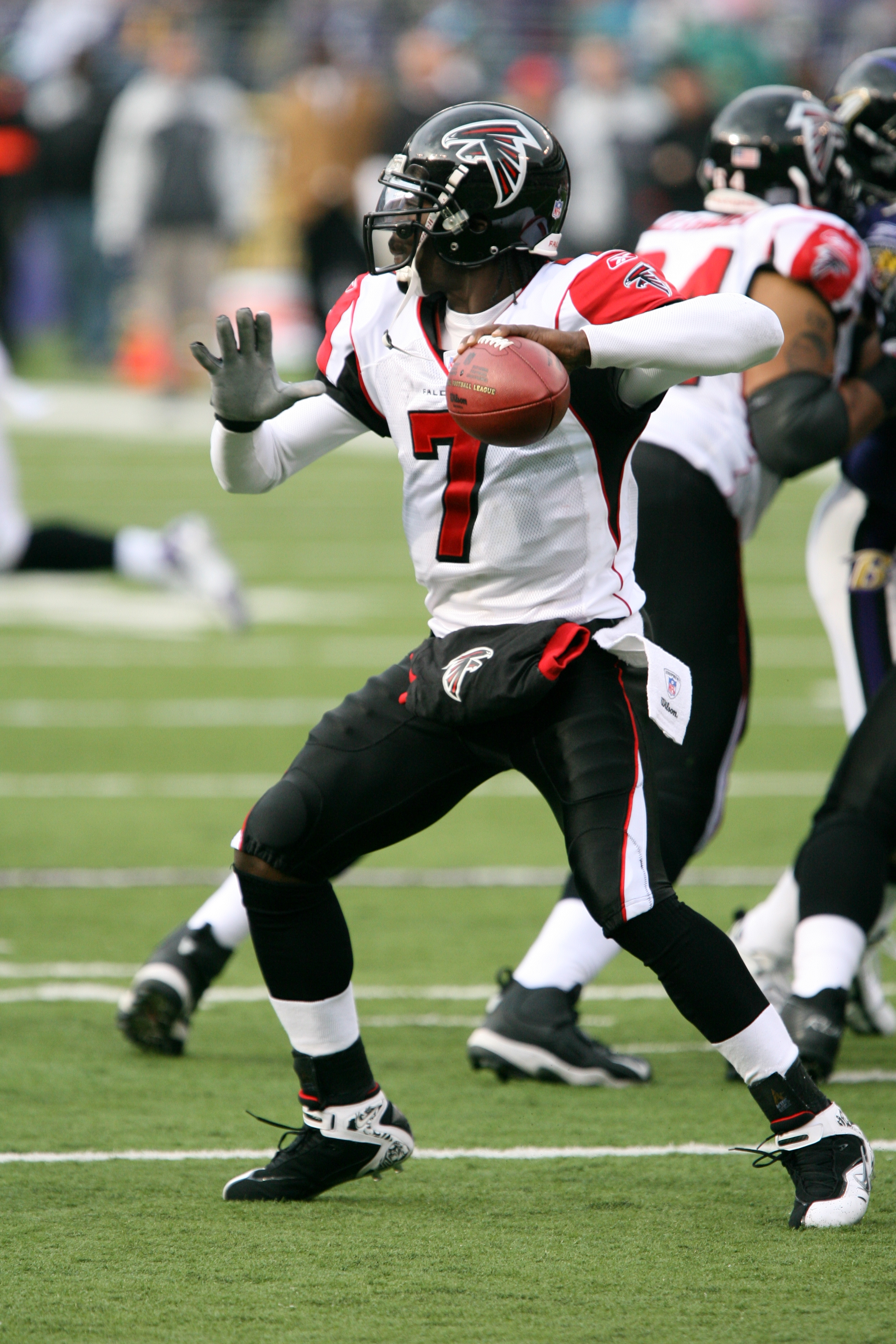
Michael Vick set the NFL record for quarterback rushing yards

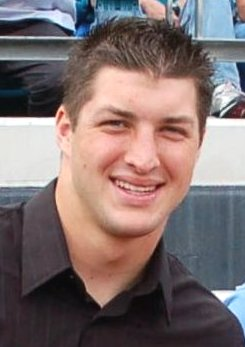
Tim Tebow led the Denver Broncos to the 2012 postseason, but would not have another NFL start

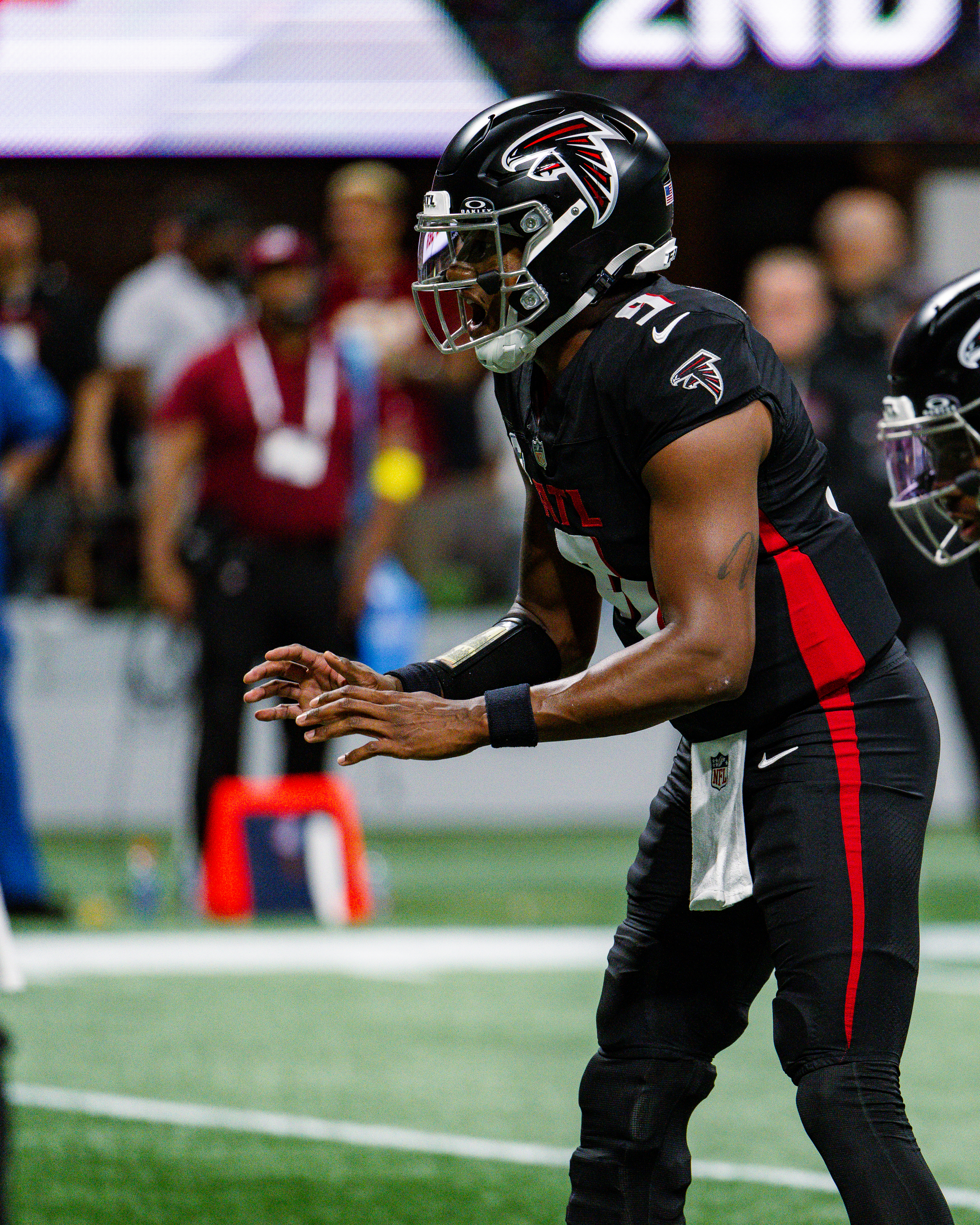
As of 2026, Michael Penix Jr. is the only left-handed starting quarterback in the NFL

Name	Career	Teams	Notes	References
Frankie Albert	1942–53	Stanford (college); San Francisco 49ers (AAFC/NFL); Calgary Stampeders (CFL)	Inducted into College Football Hall of Fame; 2× Second team All American; 3× Second team All-AAFC; Led AAFC in touchdown passes for two years; Pro Bowl (1950)	
Allie Sherman	1943–47	Brooklyn (college); Philadelphia-Pittsburgh Steagles (1943); Philadelphia Eagles (1944-1947)	Coached the New York Giants from 1961 to 1968	
John Karrs	1944–45	Duquesne (college); Cleveland Rams (1944-1945); Pittsburgh Steelers (1945)	Attempted ten passes during the 1944 season, completing four for 49 yards.	
Harry Agganis	1952	Boston University (college); Cleveland Browns	Inducted into College Football Hall of Fame; Drafted #12 by Cleveland in 1952, but never signed with the team; Signed with the Boston Red Sox and never played in the NFL	
Fred Wyant	1956–57	West Virginia (college); Washington Redskins (NFL); Toronto Argonauts (CFL)	West Virginia University Sports Hall of Fame (1994); Inaugural member of WVU’s “Mountaineer Legends Society” (2016); NFL referee between 1971 and 1990; NFL line judge 1966-1970 and 1991-1992	
Terry Baker	1963–67	Oregon State (college); Los Angeles Rams (NFL); Edmonton Eskimos (CFL)	Inducted into College Football Hall of Fame; 1962 Heisman Trophy winner; 1962 Maxwell Award winner; Consensus All American (1962); Oregon Sports Hall of Fame	
Bobby Douglass	1969–78	Kansas (college); Chicago Bears (NFL); San Diego Chargers (NFL); New Orleans Saints (NFL); Green Bay Packers (NFL)	Former holder of several NFL QB rushing records	
Ken Stabler	1970–84	Alabama (college); Oakland Raiders (AFL/NFL); Houston Oilers (NFL); New Orleans Saints (NFL)	Super Bowl XI champion; 4× Pro Bowl; 1974 NFL Most Valuable Player; 2× First team All-Pro; Posthumously inducted into Pro Football Hall of Fame (2016)	
Jim Del Gaizo	1971–75	Syracuse (college); Tampa (college); Miami Dolphins (NFL); Green Bay Packers (NFL); New York Giants (NFL)	Attempted nine passes during the Dolphins’ 1972 perfect season	
Dennis Morrison	1973–74	Kansas State (college); San Francisco 49ers (NFL)		
David Humm	1975–84	Nebraska (college); Oakland Raiders (NFL); Buffalo Bills (NFL); Baltimore Colts (NFL); Los Angeles Rams (NFL)	Second team All-Big Eight (1972); First team All-Big Eight (1974); Second team All American (1974); 2× Super Bowl Champion (XI, XVIII)	
Jim Zorn	1975–87	Cal Poly Pomona (college); Dallas Cowboys (NFL); Seattle Seahawks (NFL); Green Bay Packers (NFL); Winnipeg Blue Bombers (CFL); Tampa Bay Buccaneers (NFL)	First team All-Pro (1978); Seahawks Ring of Honor; Washington Redskins head coach 2008 and 2009	
Paul McDonald	1980–87	USC (college); Cleveland Browns (NFL); Seattle Seahawks (NFL); Dallas Cowboys (NFL)	Second team All-Pac-10 (1978); First team All-Pac-10 (1979); Second team All American (1979); NCAA Silver Anniversary Award recipient (2005)	
Boomer Esiason	1984–97	Maryland (college); Cincinnati Bengals (NFL); New York Jets (NFL); Arizona Cardinals (NFL)	4× Pro Bowl; First team All-Pro (1988); NFL Most Valuable Player (1988)	
Steve Young	1984–99	BYU (college); Los Angeles Express (USFL); Tampa Bay Buccaneers (NFL); San Francisco 49ers (NFL)	First left-handed QB inducted into the Pro Football Hall of Fame (2005); 3× Super Bowl champion (XXIII, XXIV, XXIX); Super Bowl MVP (XXIX); 2× NFL Most Valuable Player; 7× Pro Bowl	
Erik Wilhelm	1989–2001	Oregon State (college); Cincinnati Bengals (NFL); Phoenix Cardinals (NFL); New York Jets (NFL); Portland Prowlers (AFL); Los Angeles Avengers (AFL); Tampa Bay Storm (AFL)	Second at the time of his departure (Note: Behind only John Elway.) in career passing yards in the Pac-10 (now Pac-12).	
Jeff Carlson	1989–92	Weber State (college); Los Angeles Rams (NFL); Tampa Bay Buccaneers (NFL); New England Patriots (NFL)		
Scott Mitchell	1990–2001	Utah (college); Miami Dolphins (NFL); Orlando Thunder (WLAF); Detroit Lions (NFL); Baltimore Ravens (NFL); Cincinnati Bengals (NFL)	Former holder of several Detroit Lions passing records	
Todd Marinovich	1990–93, 1999–2001	USC (college); Los Angeles Raiders (NFL); Winnipeg Blue Bombers (CFL); BC Lions (CFL); Los Angeles Avengers (Arena Football)	USA Today All-USA high school football team (1987); AFL all-rookie team (2001)	
Will Furrer	1992–95	Virginia Tech (college); Chicago Bears (NFL); Houston Oilers (NFL)		
Mark Brunell	1993–2011	Washington (college); Green Bay Packers (NFL); Jacksonville Jaguars (NFL); Washington Redskins (NFL); New Orleans Saints (NFL); New York Jets (NFL)	1993 Rose Bowl champion; Super Bowl XLIV Champion; 3× Pro Bowl; Pride of the Jaguars	
Doug Nussmeier	1994–2000	Idaho (college); New Orleans Saints (NFL); Indianapolis Colts (NFL); BC Lions (CFL)	Walter Payton Award winner (1993); Holds numerous Idaho passing records; Only one of five quarterbacks in NCAA history to pass for over 10,000 yards and rush for over 1,000	
Tony Graziani	1997–2008	Oregon (college); Atlanta Falcons (NFL); Los Angeles Avengers (AFL); Philadelphia Soul (AFL)	Highest-paid player in Arena Football League history	
Brock Huard	1999–2004	Washington (college); Seattle Seahawks (NFL); Indianapolis Colts (NFL)	Brother of quarterback Damon Huard; First set of brothers in NFL History to start at quarterback on the same weekend	
Cade McNown	1999–2002	UCLA (college); Chicago Bears (NFL); Miami Dolphins (NFL); San Francisco 49ers (NFL)	1998 Consensus All-American; 1998 Johnny Unitas Golden Arm Award winner	
Michael Vick	2001–15	Virginia Tech (college); Atlanta Falcons (NFL); Philadelphia Eagles (NFL); New York Jets (NFL); Pittsburgh Steelers (NFL)	Right-handed outside of football; Highest rated passer in college football (1999); 2001 first overall pick; 4× Pro Bowl; 2010 NFL Comeback Player of the Year; Most career rushing yards by an NFL Quarterback	
Chris Simms	2003–10	Texas (college); Green Bay Packers (NFL); Tampa Bay Buccaneers (NFL); Tennessee Titans (NFL); Denver Broncos (NFL)	Former holder of several Texas Longhorns football passing records; Son of quarterback Phil Simms	
Jared Lorenzen	2004–14	Kentucky (college); New York Giants (NFL); Indianapolis Colts (NFL); Kentucky Horsemen (AF2); Northern Kentucky River Monsters (UIFL/CIFL); Owensboro Rage (CIFL)	Second Team All-SEC (2002); Most pass attempts and yards in Kentucky Wildcats football history; Super Bowl XLII champion	
Tyler Palko	2004–11	Pittsburgh (college); New Orleans Saints (NFL); Arizona Cardinals (NFL); California Redwoods (UFL); Montreal Alouettes (CFL); Pittsburgh Steelers (NFL); Kansas City Chiefs (NFL)	USA Today All-America Team (Second-team) (2001); University of Pittsburgh Team MVP (2004); 2× Second-team Big East (2004, 2005)	
Matt Leinart	2006–13	USC (college); Arizona Cardinals (NFL); Houston Texans (NFL); Oakland Raiders (NFL); Buffalo Bills (NFL)	2004 Heisman Trophy winner; 2005 Johnny Unitas Golden Arm Award winner; Inducted into College Football Hall of Fame	
Pat White	2009–14	West Virginia (college); Miami Dolphins (NFL); Virginia Destroyers (UFL); Washington Redskins (NFL); Edmonton Eskimos (CFL)	2× Big East Offensive Player of the Year (2006, 2007); 3× First-team All-Big East (2006-2008); Holder of numerous West Virginia Mountaineers and NCAA passing and rushing records	
Tim Tebow	2010–15 (Note: Tebow converted to tight end upon returning to professional football before the 2021 NFL season.)	Florida (college); Denver Broncos (NFL); New York Jets (NFL); New England Patriots (NFL); Philadelphia Eagles (NFL)	2× BCS national champion (2006, 2008); 2007 Heisman Trophy winner; 2× First team All American; Holder of numerous current and former Florida Gators and SEC passing records	
Kellen Moore	2012–17	Boise State (college); Dallas Cowboys (NFL); Detroit Lions (NFL)	Most wins by a quarterback in NCAA Division I FBS history (50); 2× First-team All American; Super Bowl LIX champion (Offensive Coordinator); New Orleans Saints Head Coach 2025–present	
Tua Tagovailoa	2020–present	Alabama (college); Miami Dolphins (NFL)	Right-handed outside of football; 2018 College Football Playoff National Championship winner and MVP; 2018 Maxwell Award winner; 2018 Walter Camp Award winner	
Michael Penix Jr.	2024–present	Washington (college); Atlanta Falcons (NFL)	2023 Maxwell Award winner; AP Comeback Player of the Year (2022)	
Dillon Gabriel	2025-present	UCF (college); Oklahoma (college); Oregon (college); Cleveland Browns (NFL)	Most career NCAA (FBS) touchdown passes (tied)	
Hunter Dekkers	2025-present	Iowa State (college); Iowa Western (college); Houston Gamblers (UFL); New Orleans Saints (NFL)		
Cole Payton	2026–present	North Dakota State (college); Philadelphia Eagles (NFL)		

== See also ==
- Left-handed specialist
- List of southpaw stance boxers
