= Bobby Scott (American football) =

American football player (born 1949)

No. 12
- Position: Quarterback

Personal information
- Born: April 2, 1949 (age 77); Chattanooga, Tennessee, U.S.
- Listed height: 6 ft 1 in (1.85 m)
- Listed weight: 201 lb (91 kg)

Career information
- High school: Rossville (Rossville, Georgia)
- College: Tennessee
- NFL draft: 1971: 14th round, 340th overall pick

Career history
- New Orleans Saints (1972–1982); New Jersey Generals (1983); Chicago Blitz (1983)

Career NFL statistics
- Passing attempts: 500
- Passing completions: 237
- Completion percentage: 47.4%
- TD–INT: 15–28
- Passing yards: 2,781
- Passer rating: 51.4
- Stats at Pro Football Reference

Robert Benson Scott (born April 2, 1949) is an American former professional football player who was a quarterback for 10 seasons in the National Football League (NFL) for the New Orleans Saints from 1973 to 1981. He later played for the New Jersey Generals and Chicago Blitz of the United States Football League (USFL) in 1983. He graduated from Rossville High School in Rossville, Georgia. He was second on the Saints depth chart behind Archie Manning. In 1976, Manning had surgery on his throwing shoulder and Scott had the opportunity to start.

He played college football for the Tennessee Volunteers, earning Most Outstanding Player honors in the 1971 Sugar Bowl. Tennessee defeated the Air Force Academy Falcons 34–13 in the game.

== See also ==
- List of New Orleans Saints starting quarterbacks
