= List of Cincinnati Bengals starting quarterbacks =

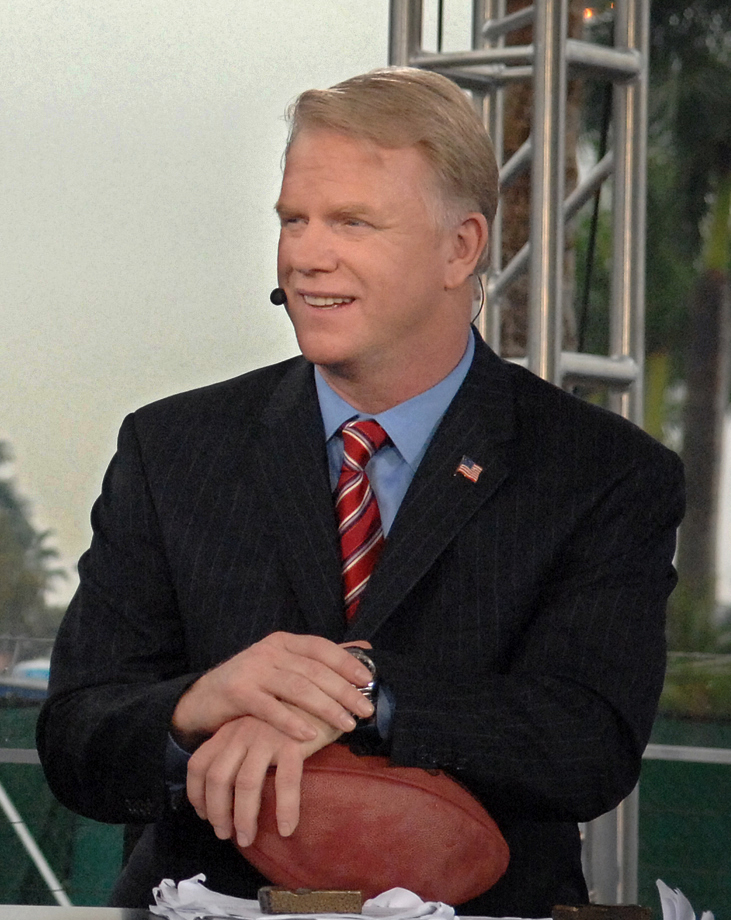
Boomer Esiason (1984–1992, 1997)

These quarterbacks have started at least one game for the Cincinnati Bengals of the National Football League (NFL).

== Starting quarterbacks ==
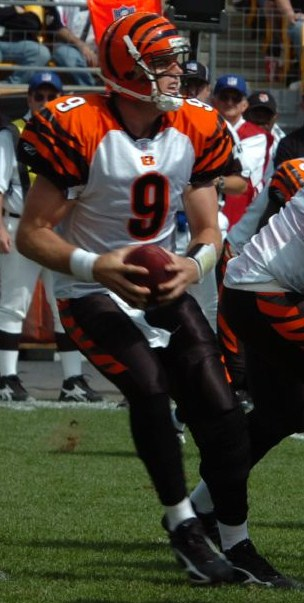
Carson Palmer (2004–2010)

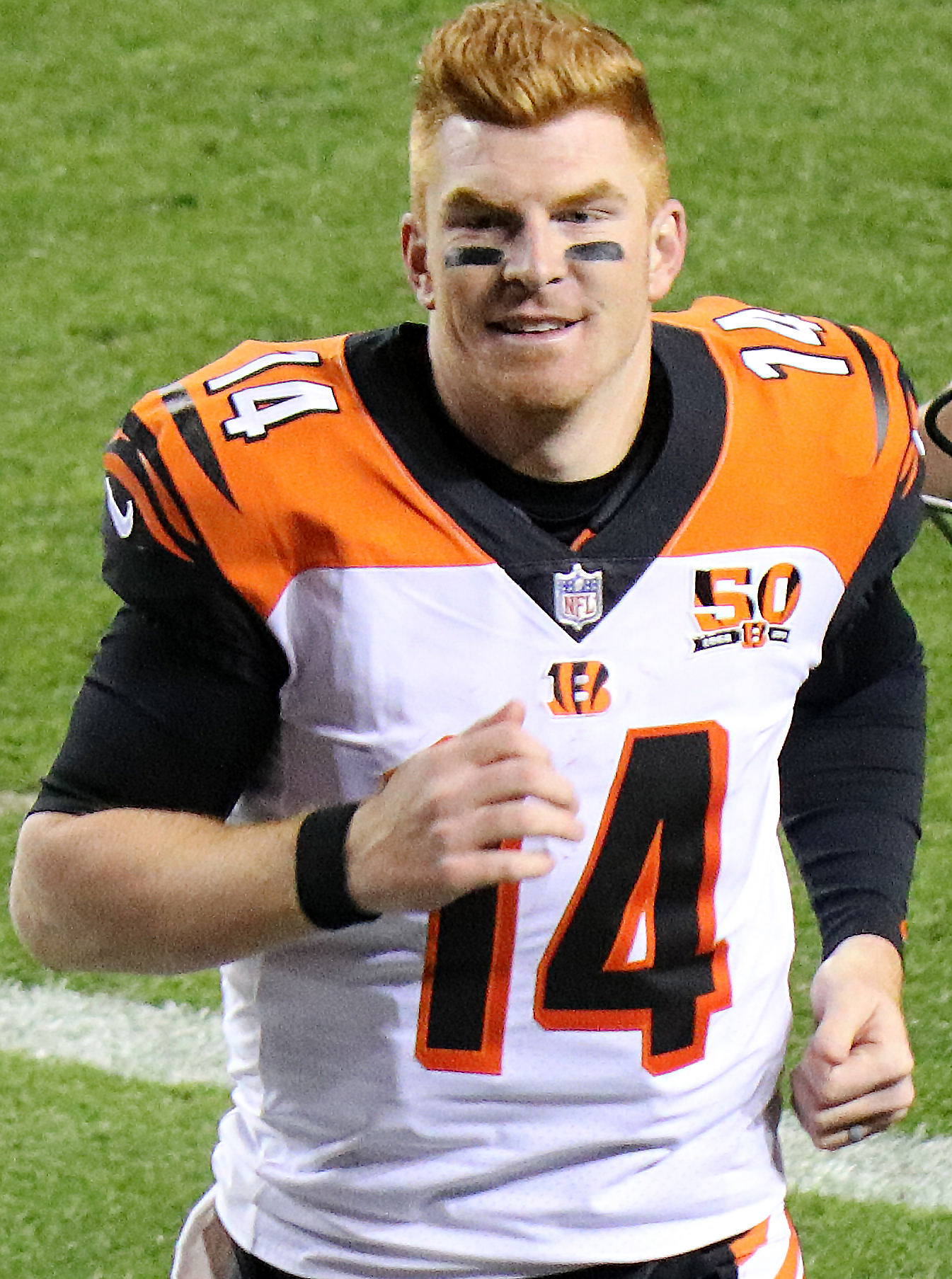
Andy Dalton (2011–2019)

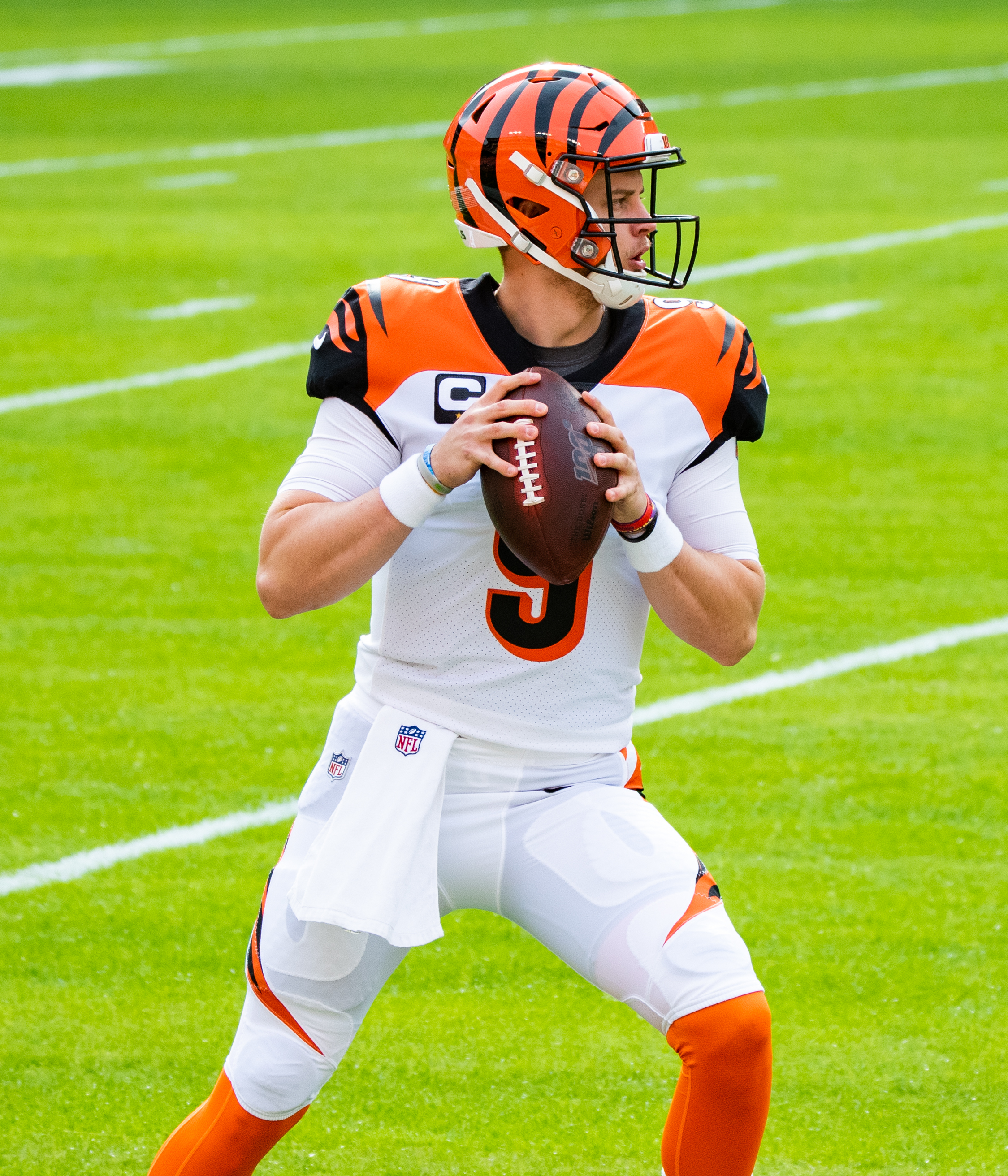
Joe Burrow (2020–present)

The number of games they started during the season is listed to the right:

=== Regular season ===
Season(s)	Quarterback(s)
1968	John Stofa (7) / Dewey Warren (4) / Sam Wyche (3)
1969	Greg Cook (11) / Sam Wyche (3)
1970	Virgil Carter (11) / Sam Wyche (3)
1971	Virgil Carter (10) / Ken Anderson (4)
1972	Ken Anderson (13) / Virgil Carter (1)
1973	Ken Anderson (14)
1974	Ken Anderson (13) / Wayne Clark (1)
1975	Ken Anderson (13) / John Reaves (1)
1976	Ken Anderson (14)
1977	Ken Anderson (13) / John Reaves (1)
1978	Ken Anderson (12) / John Reaves (4)
1979	Ken Anderson (15) / Jack Thompson (1)
1980	Ken Anderson (12) / Jack Thompson (4)
1981	Ken Anderson (16)
1982	Ken Anderson (9)
1983	Ken Anderson (13) / Turk Schonert (3)
1984	Ken Anderson (9) / Boomer Esiason (4) / Turk Schonert (3)
1985	Boomer Esiason (14) / Ken Anderson (2)
1986	Boomer Esiason (16)
1987	Boomer Esiason (12) / Dave Walter (2) / Adrian Breen (1)
1988	Boomer Esiason (16)
1989	Boomer Esiason (15) / Turk Schonert (1)
1990	Boomer Esiason (16)
1991	Boomer Esiason (14) / Donald Hollas (1) / Erik Wilhelm (1)
1992	Boomer Esiason (11) / David Klingler (4) / Donald Hollas (1)
1993	David Klingler (13) / Jay Schroeder (3)
1994	Jeff Blake (9) / David Klingler (7)
1995	Jeff Blake (16)
1996	Jeff Blake (16)
1997	Jeff Blake (11) / Boomer Esiason (5)
1998	Neil O'Donnell (11) / Paul Justin (3) / Jeff Blake (2)
1999	Jeff Blake (12) / Akili Smith (4)
2000	Akili Smith (11) / Scott Mitchell (5)
2001	Jon Kitna (15) / Akili Smith (1)
2002	Jon Kitna (12) / Gus Frerotte (3) / Akili Smith (1)
2003	Jon Kitna (16)
2004	Carson Palmer (13) / Jon Kitna (3)
2005	Carson Palmer (16)
2006	Carson Palmer (16)
2007	Carson Palmer (16)
2008	Ryan Fitzpatrick (12) / Carson Palmer (4)
2009	Carson Palmer (16)
2010	Carson Palmer (16)
2011	Andy Dalton (16)
2012	Andy Dalton (16)
2013	Andy Dalton (16)
2014	Andy Dalton (16)
2015	Andy Dalton (13) / A. J. McCarron (3)
2016	Andy Dalton (16)
2017	Andy Dalton (16)
2018	Andy Dalton (11) / Jeff Driskel (5)
2019	Andy Dalton (13) / Ryan Finley (3)
2020	Joe Burrow (10) / Brandon Allen (5) / Ryan Finley (1)
2021	Joe Burrow (16) / Brandon Allen (1)
2022	Joe Burrow (16) (Note: Due to an injury involving Damar Hamlin, the Bengals Week 17 game against the Buffalo Bills was canceled.)
2023	Joe Burrow (10) / Jake Browning (7)
2024	Joe Burrow (17)
2025	Joe Burrow (8) / Joe Flacco (6) / Jake Browning (3)
2026	Joe Burrow (3)

=== Postseason ===
Season	Quarterback(s)
1970	Virgil Carter (0–1)
1973	Ken Anderson (0–1)
1975	Ken Anderson (0–1)
1981	Ken Anderson (2–1)
1982	Ken Anderson (0–1)
1988	Boomer Esiason (2–1)
1990	Boomer Esiason (1–1)
2005	Carson Palmer (0–1)
2009	Carson Palmer (0–1)
2011	Andy Dalton (0–1)
2012	Andy Dalton (0–1)
2013	Andy Dalton (0–1)
2014	Andy Dalton (0–1)
2015	A. J. McCarron (0–1)
2021	Joe Burrow (3–1)
2022	Joe Burrow (2–1)

== Most games as starting quarterback ==
These quarterbacks have the most starts for the Bengals in regular season games (through the 2026 NFL season).

Name	
GP	Games played
GS	Games started
W	Number of wins as starting quarterback
L	Number of losses as starting quarterback
T	Number of ties as starting quarterback
Pct	Winning Percentage as starting quarterback

Name	Period	GP	GS	W	L	T	%
Ken Anderson	1971–1986	192	172	91	81	–	.529
Andy Dalton	2011–2019	133	133	70	61	2	.534
Boomer Esiason	1984–1992, 1997	134	123	62	61	–	.504
Carson Palmer	2004–2010	97	97	46	51	–	.474
Joe Burrow	2020–present	79	79	45	33	1	.576
Jeff Blake	1994–1999	75	66	25	41	–	.379
Jon Kitna	2001–2005	53	46	18	28	–	.391

== Team career passing records ==
(Through the 2026 NFL season)

Name	Comp	Att	%	Yds	TD	Int
Andy Dalton	2,757	4,449	62.0	31,594	204	118
Ken Anderson	2,654	4,475	59.3	32,838	197	160
Carson Palmer	2,024	3,217	62.9	22,694	154	100
Boomer Esiason	2,015	3,564	56.5	27,149	187	131
Joe Burrow	1,966	2,872	68.5	21,271	160	52
Jeff Blake	1,240	2,221	55.8	15,134	93	62
Jon Kitna	1,009	1,707	59.1	10,707	59	59

== See also ==
- List of NFL starting quarterbacks
