= List of New Orleans Saints starting quarterbacks =

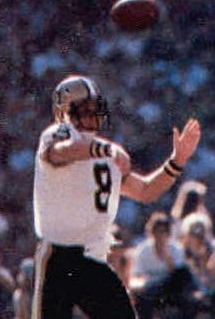
Archie Manning (1971–1975, 1977–1981)

These quarterbacks have started at least one game for the New Orleans Saints of the National Football League (NFL).

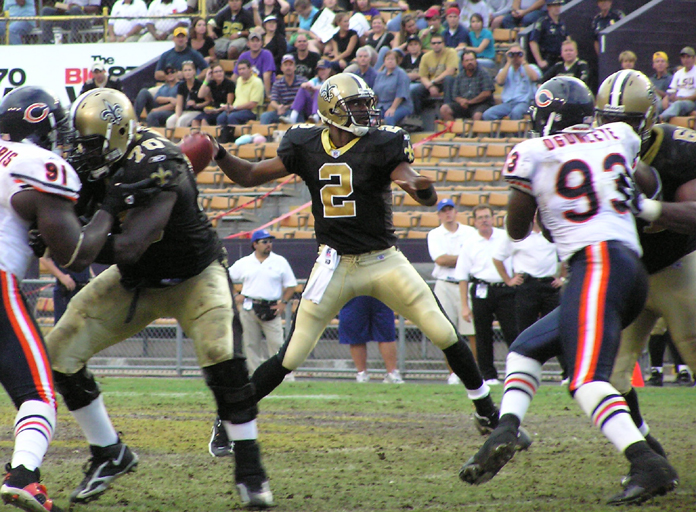
Aaron Brooks (2000–2005)

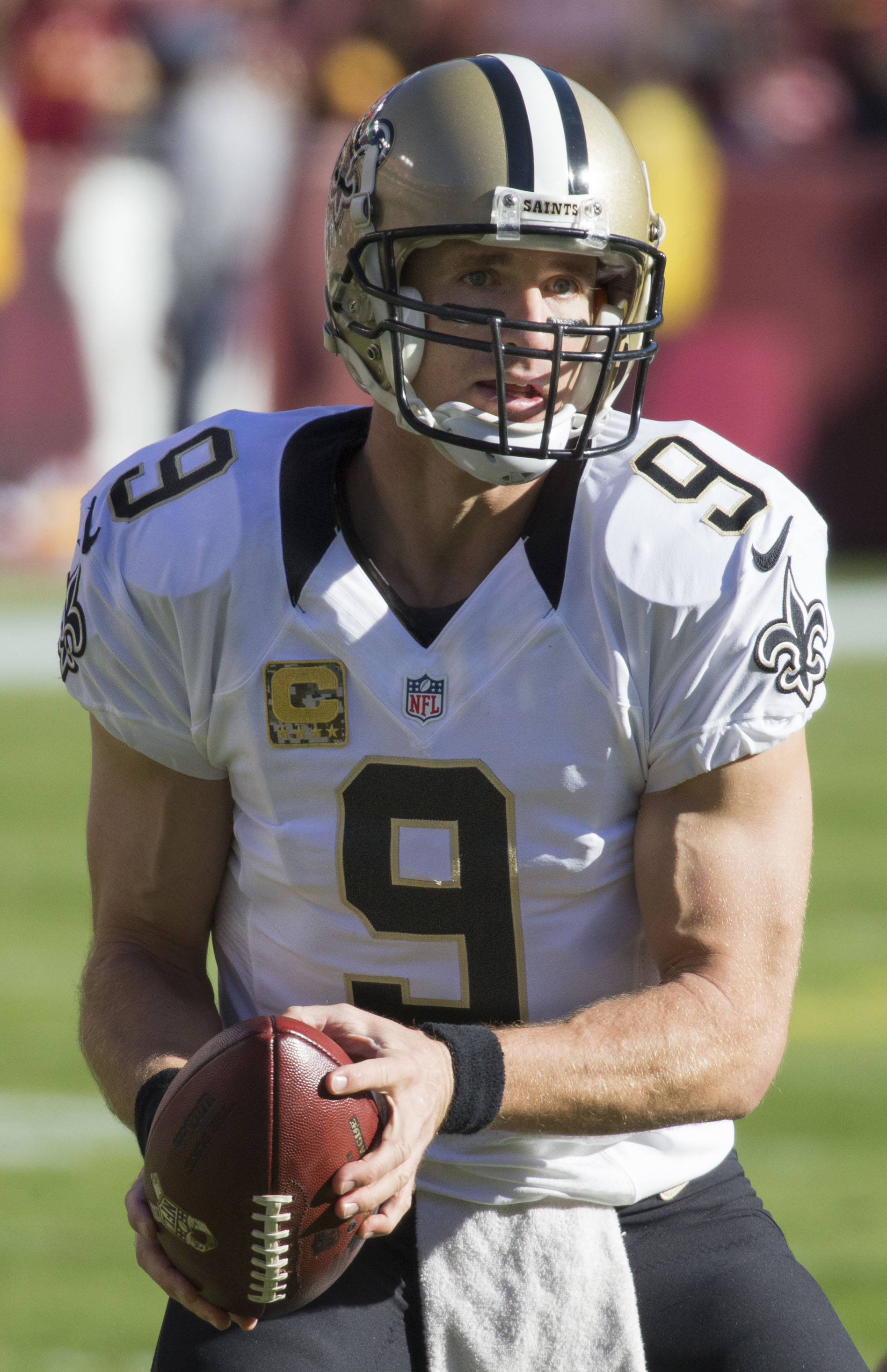
Drew Brees (2006–2020)

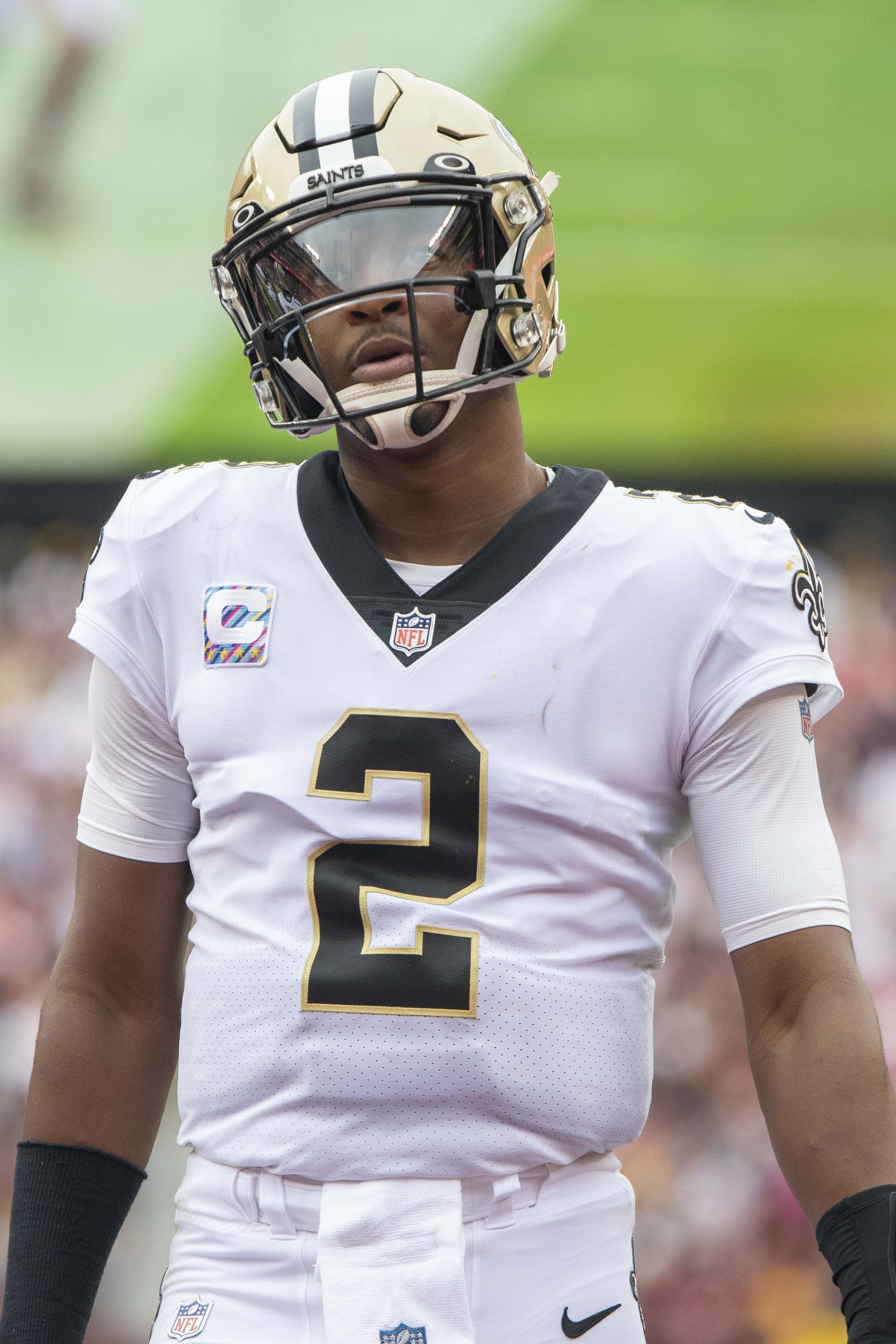
Jameis Winston (2021–2022)

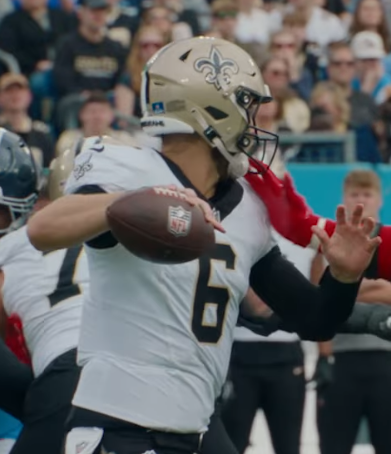
Tyler Shough (2025–present)

The number of games they started during the season is listed to the right:

== Starting quarterbacks ==
Seasons
1967	Gary Cuozzo (3–7) / Billy Kilmer (0–4)	
1968	Billy Kilmer (4–7) / Karl Sweetan (0–2–1)	
1969	Billy Kilmer (5–9)	
1970	Billy Kilmer (2–8) / Edd Hargett (0–3–1)	
1971	Archie Manning (3–5–2) / Edd Hargett (1–3)	
1972	Archie Manning (2–11–1)	
1973	Archie Manning (5–8) / Bobby Scott (0–1)	
1974	Archie Manning (3–8) / Larry Cipa (1–1) / Bobby Scott (1–0)	
1975	Archie Manning (2–11) / Larry Cipa (0–1)	
1976	Bobby Scott (2–6) / Bobby Douglass (2–4)	
1977	Archie Manning (1–8) / Bobby Scott (1–2) / Bobby Douglass (1–1)	
1978	Archie Manning (7–9)	
1979	Archie Manning (8–8)	
1980	Archie Manning (1–15)	
1981	Archie Manning (3–8) / Dave Wilson (1–3) / Bobby Scott (0–1)	
1982	Ken Stabler (4–4) / Guido Merkens (0–1)	
1983	Ken Stabler (7–7) / Dave Wilson (1–1)	
1984	Richard Todd (6–8) / Dave Wilson (1–1)	
1985	Dave Wilson (3–7) / Bobby Hebert (2–4)	
1986	Dave Wilson (6–7) / Bobby Hebert (1–2)	
1987	Bobby Hebert (10–2) / John Fourcade (2–1)	Bobby Hebert (0–1)
1988	Bobby Hebert (10–6)	
1989	Bobby Hebert (6–7) / John Fourcade (3–0)	
1990	Steve Walsh (6–5) / John Fourcade (2–3)	Steve Walsh (0–1)
1991	Bobby Hebert (8–1) / Steve Walsh (3–4)	Bobby Hebert (0–1)
1992	Bobby Hebert (12–4)	Bobby Hebert (0–1)
1993	Wade Wilson (7–7) / Steve Walsh (1–0) / Mike Buck (0–1)	
1994	Jim Everett (7–9)	
1995	Jim Everett (7–9)	
1996	Jim Everett (3–12) / Doug Nussmeier (0–1)	
1997	Heath Shuler (4–5) / Billy Joe Hobert (2–2) / Danny Wuerffel (0–2) / Doug Nussmeier (0–1)	
1998	Kerry Collins (2–5) / Danny Wuerffel (2–2) / Billy Joe Tolliver (1–3) / Billy Joe Hobert (1–0)	
1999	Billy Joe Tolliver (1–6) / Billy Joe Hobert (1–6) / Jake Delhomme (1–1)	
2000	Jeff Blake (7–4) / Aaron Brooks (3–2)	Aaron Brooks (1–1)
2001	Aaron Brooks (7–9)	
2002	Aaron Brooks (9–7)	
2003	Aaron Brooks (8–8)	
2004	Aaron Brooks (8–8)	
2005	Aaron Brooks (3–10) / Todd Bouman (0–3)	
2006	Drew Brees (10–6)	Drew Brees (1–1)
2007	Drew Brees (7–9)	
2008	Drew Brees (8–8)	
2009	Drew Brees (13–2) / Mark Brunell (0–1)	Drew Brees (3–0)
2010	Drew Brees (11–5)	Drew Brees (0–1)
2011	Drew Brees (13–3)	Drew Brees (1–1)
2012	Drew Brees (7–9)	
2013	Drew Brees (11–5)	Drew Brees (1–1)
2014	Drew Brees (7–9)	
2015	Drew Brees (7–8) / Luke McCown (0–1)	
2016	Drew Brees (7–9)	
2017	Drew Brees (11–5)	Drew Brees (1–1)
2018	Drew Brees (13–2) / Teddy Bridgewater (0–1)	Drew Brees (1–1)
2019	Drew Brees (8–3) / Teddy Bridgewater (5–0)	Drew Brees (0–1)
2020	Drew Brees (9–3) / Taysom Hill (3–1)	Drew Brees (1–1)
2021	Jameis Winston (5–2) / Taysom Hill (4–1) / Trevor Siemian (1-3) / Ian Book (0–1)	
2022	Andy Dalton (6–8) / Jameis Winston (1–2)	
2023	Derek Carr (9–8)	
2024	Derek Carr (5–5) / Spencer Rattler (0–6) / Jake Haener (0–1)	
2025	Tyler Shough (5–4) / Spencer Rattler (1–7)	
2026	Tyler Shough (1–1)	

== Most games as starting quarterback ==
These quarterbacks have the most starts for the Saints in regular season games (through the 2025 NFL season).

Name	
GP	Games played
GS	Games started
W	Number of wins as starting quarterback
L	Number of losses as starting quarterback
T	Number of ties as starting quarterback
Pct	Winning percentage as starting quarterback

Name	Period	GP	GS	W	L	T	%
Drew Brees	2006–2020	228	228	142	86	—	.623
Archie Manning	1971–1982	134	129	35	91	3	.283
Aaron Brooks	2000–2005	85	82	38	44	—	.463
Bobby Hebert	1985–1992	78	75	49	26	—	.653
Jim Everett	1994–1996	47	47	17	30	—	.362

== Team career passing records ==
(Through the 2020 NFL season)

Name	Comp	Att	%	Yds	TD	Int
Drew Brees	6,017	8,742	68.8	68,010	491	190
Archie Manning	1,849	3,335	55.4	21,734	115	156
Aaron Brooks	1,563	2,771	56.4	19,156	120	84
Bobby Hebert	1,202	2,055	58.5	14,630	85	75
Jim Everett	958	1,571	61.0	10,622	60	48
