= List of USC Trojans starting quarterbacks =

The following individuals have started games at the quarterback position for the USC Trojans football team, updated from 1975 through November 15, 2025. Inductees into the College Football Hall of Fame are designated alongside the player's final season. Players who had taken a redshirt season are designated ( (redshirt) ).

Year	Name	Class	First career start	Number of starts	Record as starter	Awards/honors	References
2025	Jayden Maiava	(redshirt) Jr.		10	8–2		
2024	Miller Moss	(redshirt) Jr.		9	4–5		
2024	Jayden Maiava	(redshirt) So.	November 16	4	3–1		
2023	Caleb Williams	Jr.		12	7–5		
2023	Miller Moss	(redshirt) So.	December 27	1	1–0	Holiday Bowl Offensive MVP	
2022	Caleb Williams	So.	September 3	13	11–2	Heisman; Maxwell Award; Walter Camp Award; Pac-12 Offensive Player of the Year; All-Pac-12 First Team; AP Player of the Year	
2021	Kedon Slovis	Jr.		9	4–5		
2021	Jaxson Dart	Fr.	November 20	3	0–3		
2020	Kedon Slovis	So.		6	5–1	All-Pac-12 First Team	
2019	JT Daniels	So.		1	1–0		
2019	Kedon Slovis	Fr.	September 7	11	7–4	Pac-12 Offensive Freshman of the Year; All-Pac-12 Team Honorable Mention	
2019	Matt Fink	(redshirt) Jr.	September 28	1	0–1		
2018	JT Daniels	Fr.	September 1	11	5–6		
2018	Jack Sears	(redshirt) Fr.	October 27	1	0–1		
2017	Sam Darnold	(redshirt) So.		14	11–3	All-Pac-12 First Team; Pac-12 Championship Game MVP	
2016	Sam Darnold	(redshirt) Fr	September 23	10	9–1	Pac-12 Offensive Freshman of the Year; All-Pac-12 Team Honorable Mention; Rose Bowl Offensive MVP	
2016	Max Browne	(redshirt) Jr.	September 3	3	1–2		
2015	Cody Kessler	(redshirt) Sr.		13	8–5		
2014	Cody Kessler	(redshirt) Jr.		13	9–4	Holiday Bowl Offensive MVP	
2013	Cody Kessler	(redshirt) So.	August 29	14	10–4		
2012	Matt Barkley	Sr.		11	7–4	Wuerffel Trophy	
2012	Max Wittek	(redshirt) Fr.	November 24	2	0–2		
2011	Matt Barkley	Jr.		12	10–2	All-Pac-12 Second Team	
2010	Matt Barkley	So.		12	8–4		
2010	Mitch Mustain	(redshirt) Sr.	November 27	1	0–1		
2009	Matt Barkley	Fr.	September 5	12	9–3		
2009	Aaron Corp	(redshirt) So.	September 19	1	0–1		
2008	Mark Sanchez	(redshirt) Jr.		13	12–1	All-Pac-10 First Team; Rose Bowl MVP	
2007	John David Booty	(redshirt) Sr.		10	9–1	Rose Bowl MVP	
2007	Mark Sanchez	(redshirt) So.	October 13	3	2–1		
2006	John David Booty	(redshirt) Jr.	September 2	13	11–2	All-Pac-10 First Team	
2005	Matt Leinart	(redshirt) Sr.		13	12–1	Unitas; All-Pac-10 First Team; College Football Hall of Fame (2017)	
2004	Matt Leinart	(redshirt) Jr.		13	13–0	Heisman; Consensus All-American; Co-Pac-10 Offensive Player of the Year; All-Pac-10 First Team; Walter Camp Award; AP Player of the Year; Manning Award; Orange Bowl MVP	
2003	Matt Leinart	(redshirt) So.	August 30	13	12–1	Pac-10 Offensive Player of the Year; All-Pac-10 First Team; Rose Bowl MVP	
2002	Carson Palmer	(redshirt) Sr.		13	11–2	Heisman; Unitas; Consensus All-American; Co-Pac-10 Offensive Player of the Year; All-Pac-10 First Team; Sporting News College Football Player of the Year; Orange Bowl MVP; College Football Hall of Fame (2021)	
2001	Carson Palmer	(redshirt) Jr.		12	6–6		
2000	Carson Palmer	(redshirt) So.		12	5–7		
1999	Carson Palmer	So.		3	2–1		
1999	Mike Van Raaphorst	(redshirt) Jr.		5	1–4		
1999	John Fox	(redshirt) Sr.		4	3–1		
1998	Carson Palmer	Fr.	October 31	5	3–2		
1998	Mike Van Raaphorst	(redshirt) So.		8	5–3		
1997	John Fox	(redshirt) So.	September 6	9	5–4		
1997	Mike Van Raaphorst	(redshirt) Fr.	November 1	2	1–1		
1996	Brad Otton	(redshirt) Sr.		12	6–6		
1995	Brad Otton	(redshirt) Jr.		10	8–1–1		
1995	Kyle Wachholtz	(redshirt) Sr.	November 11	2	1–1		
1994	Rob Johnson	Sr.		10	6–3–1		
1994	Brad Otton	(redshirt) So.	October 8	2	2–0		
1993	Rob Johnson	Jr.		13	8–5	All-Pac-10 First Team	
1992	Rob Johnson	So.		12	6–5–1		
1991	Reggie Perry	(redshirt) So.	September 2	10	3–7		
1991	Rob Johnson	Fr.	November 16	1	0–1		
1990	Todd Marinovich	(redshirt) So.		11	7–4		
1990	Shane Foley	(redshirt) Sr.	October 27	2	1–0–1		
1989	Todd Marinovich	(redshirt) Fr.	September 4	12	9–2–1	All-Pac-10 First Team	
1988	Rodney Peete	(redshirt) Sr.		12	10–2	Unitas; Pac-10 Offensive Player of the Year; All-Pac-10 First Team	
1987	Rodney Peete	(redshirt) Jr.		12	8–4		
1986	Rodney Peete	(redshirt) So.		12	7–5	All-Pac-10 Second Team	
1985	Rodney Peete	(redshirt) Fr.	November 16	4	2–2		
1985	Sean Salisbury	(redshirt) Sr.		8	4–4		
1984	Tim Green	Sr.	October 6	9	7–2	Rose Bowl Co-MVP	
1984	Kevin McLean	(redshirt) Fr.	September 29	1	0–1		
1984	Sean Salisbury	Sr.		2	2–0		
1983	Sean Salisbury	Jr.		11	4–6–1		
1982	Scott Tinsley	Sr.		4	3–1		
1982	Sean Salisbury	So.	September 11	7	5–2		
1981	John Mazur	(redshirt) Fr.	September 5	12	9–3		
1980	Gordon Adams	(redshirt) Sr.	September 13	9	7–1–1		
1980	Scott Tinsley	So.	November 22	2	1–1		
1979	Paul McDonald	Sr.		12	11–0–1	All-Pac-10 First Team	
1978	Paul McDonald	Jr.	September 9	12	11–1		
1978	Rob Preston	Jr.	December 2	1	1–0		
1977	Rob Hertel	Sr.		12	8–4		
1976	Vince Evans	Sr.		12	11–1	Rose Bowl MVP	
1975	Vince Evans	Jr.	?	8	4–4		
1975	Mike Sanford	So.	November 15	1	0–1		
1975	Rob Hertel	So.	October 4	3	3–0		
