= List of Green Bay Packers starting quarterbacks =

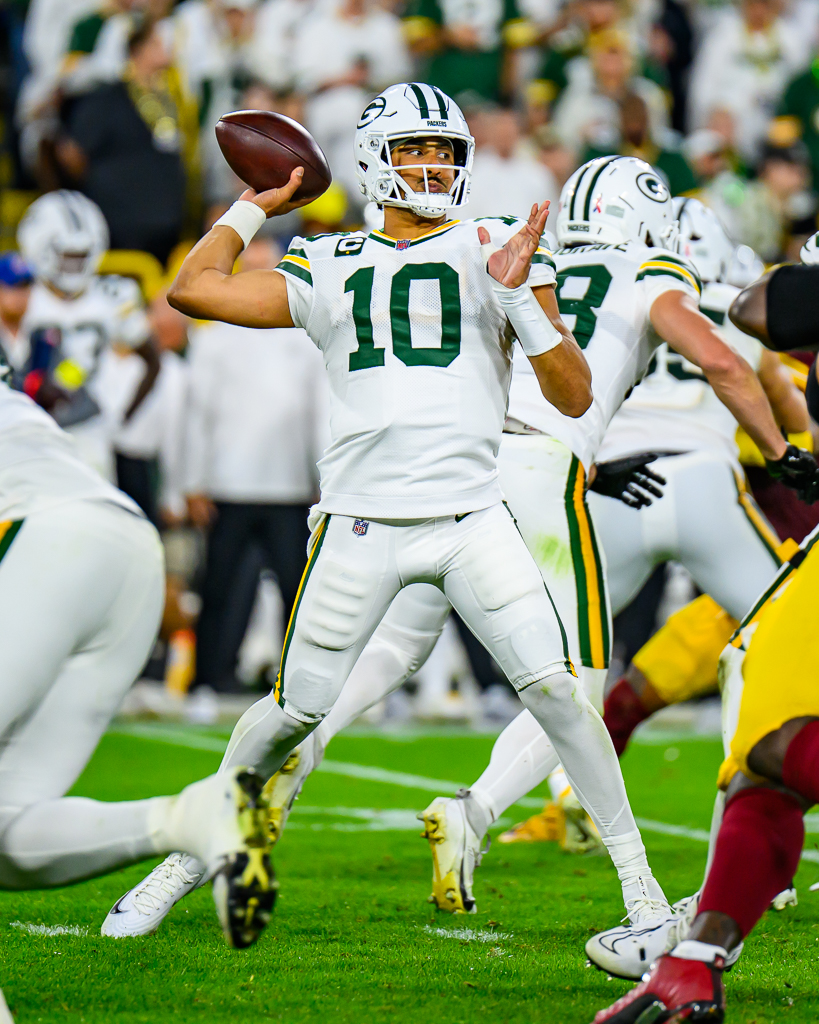
Jordan Love was the Packers' starting quarterback for every game of the 2023 NFL season.

The Green Bay Packers are a professional American football team based in Green Bay, Wisconsin. The Packers have competed in the National Football League (NFL) since 1921, two years after their original founding by Curly Lambeau and George Whitney Calhoun. They are members of the North Division of the National Football Conference (NFC) and play their home games at Lambeau Field in central Wisconsin. The early era of the NFL and American football in general was not conducive to passing the football, with the forward pass not being legalized until the early 1900s and not fully adopted for many more years. Although the quarterback position has historically been the one to receive the snap and thus handle the football on every offensive play, the importance of the position during this era was limited by various rules, like having to be five yards behind the line of scrimmage before a forward pass could be attempted. These rules and the tactical focus on rushing the ball limited the importance of the quarterback position while enhancing the value of different types of backs, such as the halfback and the fullback. Some of these backs were considered triple-threat men, capable of rushing, passing, or kicking the football, making it common for multiple players to attempt a pass during a game.

As rules changed and the NFL began adopting a more pass-centric approach to offensive football, the importance of the quarterback position grew. Beginning in 1950, total wins and losses by a team's starting quarterback were tracked. Throughout the late 20th century and early 21st century, the significance of the position has grown exponentially. The modern starting quarterback is often viewed as the leader of the team and its player spokesperson. The position is typically the highest paid player on an NFL team's roster, with teams assigning significant resources in trying to draft, acquire, or trade for a franchise quarterback. These resources are based on the high expectations placed on the position, which include handling the ball on every offensive play (whether it be to pass the ball or hand it off to another player), relaying plays (or sometimes calling plays themselves) to the offense, and understanding every teammate's role, formation, and responsibility for every play. The emergence of the dual-threat quarterback has also seen additional focus on the position, with quarterbacks like Lamar Jackson and Josh Allen leading their team in both passing and rushing yards during any given game.

Prior to 1950, the Packers had numerous players identified as playing the quarterback position, including Pro Football Hall of Fame inductee Arnie Herber. However, the combination of unreliable statistics in the early era of the NFL and the differences in the early quarterback position make tracking starts by quarterbacks impractical for this timeframe. Since 1950 however, the Packers have had 35 starting quarterbacks in the history of their franchise. Five of those quarterbacks each made over 70 starts and between them started over 75% of the team's games in that time period, with varying levels of success. Tobin Rote, who started 73 games in the 1950s, and Lynn Dickey, who started in 101 games in the late 1970s and early 1980s, saw little on-field success. However, Bart Starr, Brett Favre, and Aaron Rodgers all led the Packers to Super Bowl victories, with Starr winning five NFL championships in the 1960s. All three quarterbacks were named the NFL's Most Valuable Player at least once in their careers. Favre started the most games as quarterback for the Packers, both in the regular season (253) and during the playoffs (22). He also never missed one start with the Packers, contributing to his NFL record of 321 consecutive starts by a quarterback. After Favre was traded to the New York Jets, Rodgers took over as starting quarterback, a role he would hold for 15 seasons. Combined, from Favre's first start in 1992 to Rodgers' last start in 2022, the two quarterbacks started 476 out of 495 possible regular season games. After Rodgers was traded to the Jets in 2023, the Packers named Jordan Love starting quarterback for the 2023 NFL season. Love started all 19 games (17 in the regular season and 2 in the playoffs) during his first season as starter in 2023. He has continued as the team's primary starter, excluding missed starts due to injury, to the 2026 NFL season.

== Starting quarterbacks ==
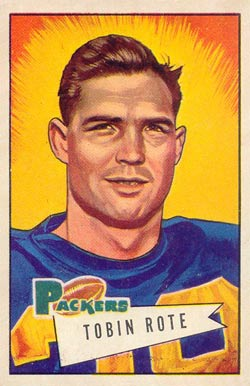
Tobin Rote started 73 games as the Packers' quarterback in the early 1950s.

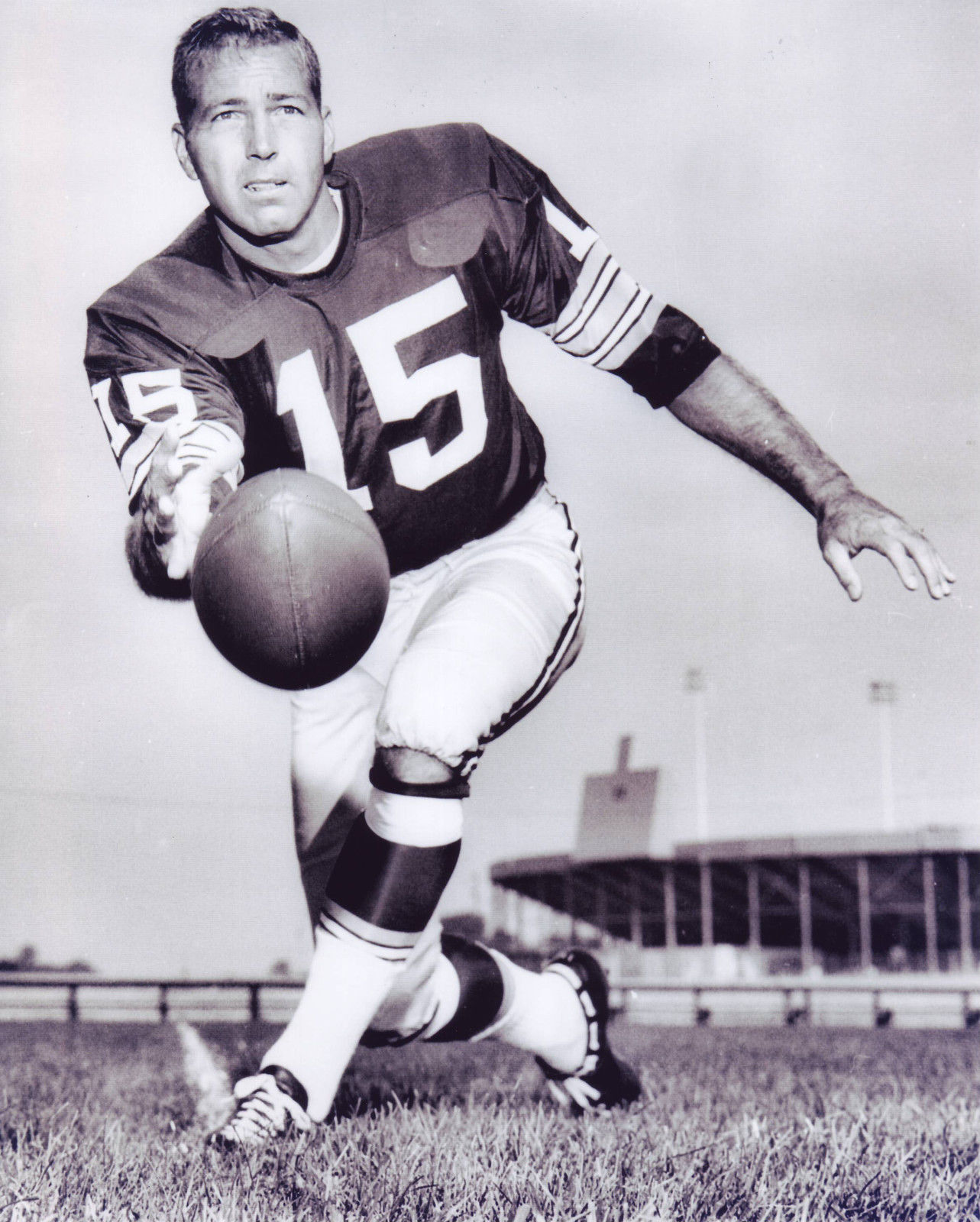
Bart Starr won five NFL Championships as the Packers' starting quarterback during most of the 1960s.

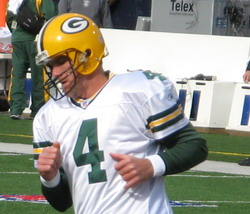
Brett Favre started 275 straight games (regular and postseason combined) for the Packers from 1992 to 2007.

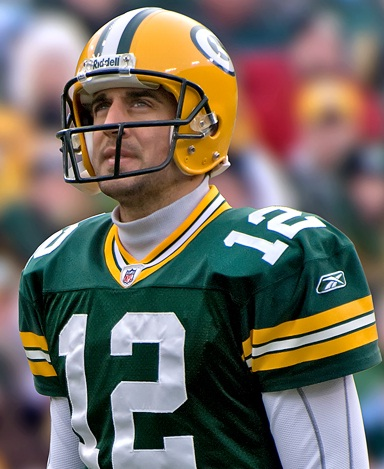
Aaron Rodgers' regular season winning percentage (.661) is the highest of any Packers quarterback (minimum 10 starts).

Key
†	Inducted into the Green Bay Packers Hall of Fame
‡	Inducted into the Green Bay Packers Hall of Fame and Pro Football Hall of Fame

=== Regular season ===
Green Bay Packers starting quarterbacks in the regular season
Quarterback	Seasons with the Packers	Seasons with at least one start as QB	Games started	Record				Refs
Quarterback	Seasons with the Packers	Seasons with at least one start as QB	Games started	W	L	T	% (Note: Winning percentage is determined by dividing total wins by total games started, with ties counting as one-half win.)	Refs
Zeke Bratkowski †	1963–1971	1966–1968, 71	9	4	4	1	.500	
Carlos Brown	1975–1976	1976	3	0	3	0	.000	
Jack Concannon	1974	1974	2	0	2	0	.000	
Jim Del Gaizo	1973	1973	3	1	2	0	.333	
Lynn Dickey †	1976–1985	1976–1977, 79–85	101	43	56	2	.436	
Anthony Dilweg	1989–1990	1990	7	2	5	0	.286	
Brett Favre ‡	1992–2007	1992–2007	253	160	93	0	.632	
Matt Flynn	2008–2011, 13–14	2008–2011, 13	6	3	3	0	.500	
Joe Francis	1958–1959	1958	1	0	1	0	.000	
John Hadl	1974–1975	1974–1975	19	7	12	0	.368	
Don Horn	1967–1970	1969–1970	6	4	2	0	.667	
Brett Hundley	2015–2017	2017	9	3	6	0	.333	
Scott Hunter	1971–1973	1971–1973	29	15	11	3	.569	
Randy Johnson	1976	1976	1	1	0	0	1.000	
Blair Kiel	1988–1991	1990–1991	2	0	2	0	.000	
Jordan Love	2020–2026	2022–2026	58	33	24	1	.588	
Don Majkowski †	1987–1992	1987–1992	49	22	26	1	.459	
Lamar McHan	1959–1960	1959–1960	11	7	4	0	.636	
Don Milan	1975	1975	1	0	1	0	.000	
Babe Parilli	1952–1953, 57–58	1952–1953, 57–58	14	3	11	0	.214	
Alan Risher	1987	1987	3	2	1	0	.667	
John Roach	1961–1963	1963	4	3	1	0	.750	
Aaron Rodgers	2005–2022	2008–2022	223	147	75	1	.661	
Tobin Rote †	1950–1956	1950–1956	73	26	46	1	.363	
Bart Starr ‡	1956–1971	1956–1971	157	94	57	6	.618	
Jerry Tagge	1972–1974	1973–1974	12	6	6	0	.500	
Bobby Thomason	1951	1951	4	0	1	0	.000	
Scott Tolzien	2013–2015	2013	2	0	1	1	.250	
Mike Tomczak	1991	1991	7	2	5	0	.286	
Clayton Tune	2025	2025	1	0	1	0	.000	
Seneca Wallace	2013	2013	1	0	1	0	.000	
David Whitehurst	1977–1983	1977–1979, 81	37	16	20	1	.446	
Malik Willis	2024	2024	2	2	1	0	.667	
Randy Wright	1984–1988	1984–1988	32	7	25	0	.219	
Jim Zorn	1985	1985	5	3	2	0	.600	

=== Postseason ===
Green Bay Packers starting quarterbacks in the postseason
Quarterback	Seasons with the Packers	Seasons with at least one start as QB	Games started	Record			Refs
Quarterback	Seasons with the Packers	Seasons with at least one start as QB	Games started	W	L	%	Refs
Lynn Dickey †	1976–1985	1982	2	1	1	.500	
Brett Favre ‡	1992–2007	1993–1998, 2001–2004, 07	22	12	10	.545	
Scott Hunter	1971–1973	1972	1	0	1	.000	
Jordan Love	2020–2026	2023–2025	3	1	3	.250	
Aaron Rodgers	2005–2022	2009–2016, 19–21	21	11	10	.524	
Bart Starr ‡	1956–1971	1960–1962, 65–67	10	9	1	.900	

== See also ==
- List of starting quarterbacks in the National Football League – updated list of current starting quarterbacks for each NFL team
- List of Green Bay Packers team records – statistics and records by Green Bay Packers players, including passing records
- Lists of Green Bay Packers players – various lists of different Green Bay Packers players
