= List of Tampa Bay Buccaneers starting quarterbacks =

These quarterbacks have started at least one game for the Tampa Bay Buccaneers of the National Football League (NFL). Through the 2023 season, the Buccaneers have had 41 different starting quarterbacks since their inaugural season in 1976.

== Regular season ==
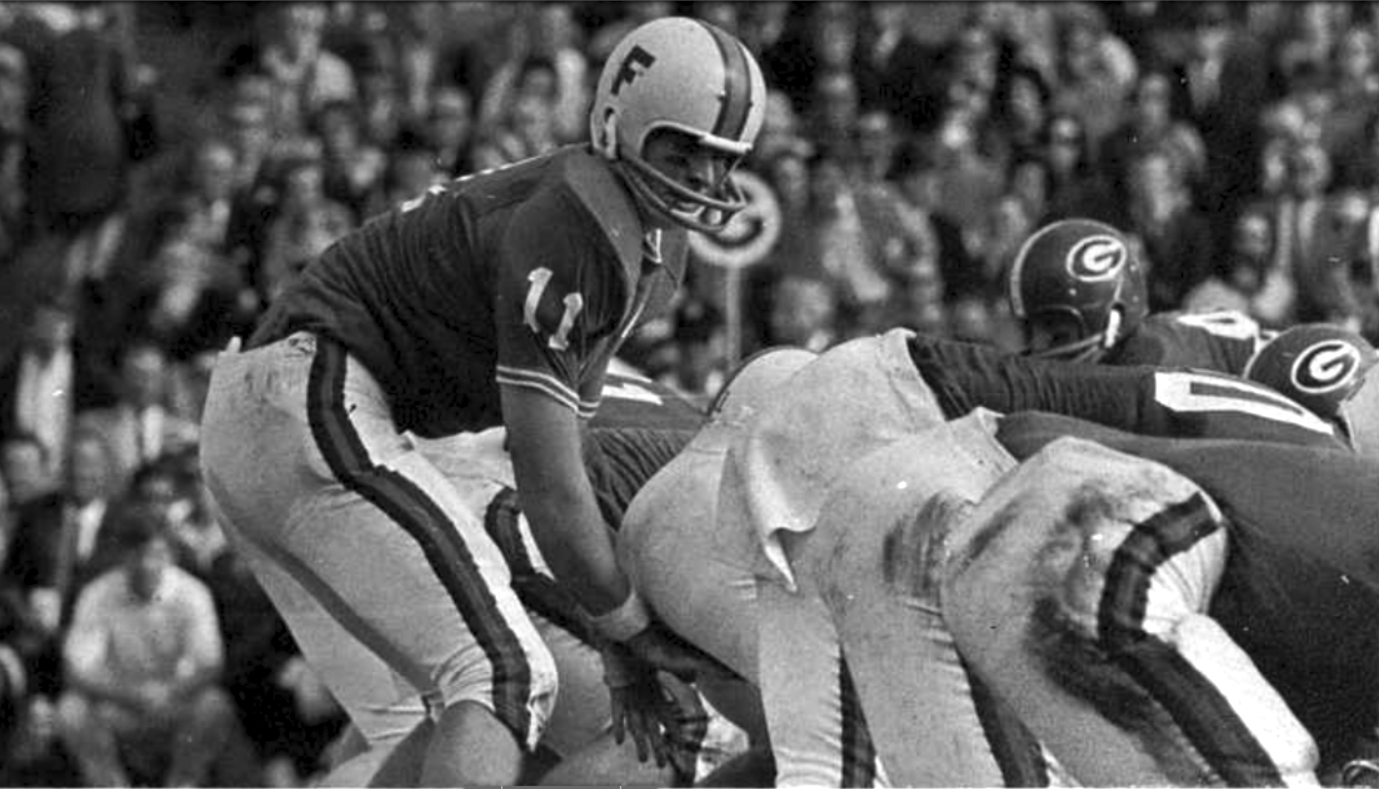
Steve Spurrier (1976)

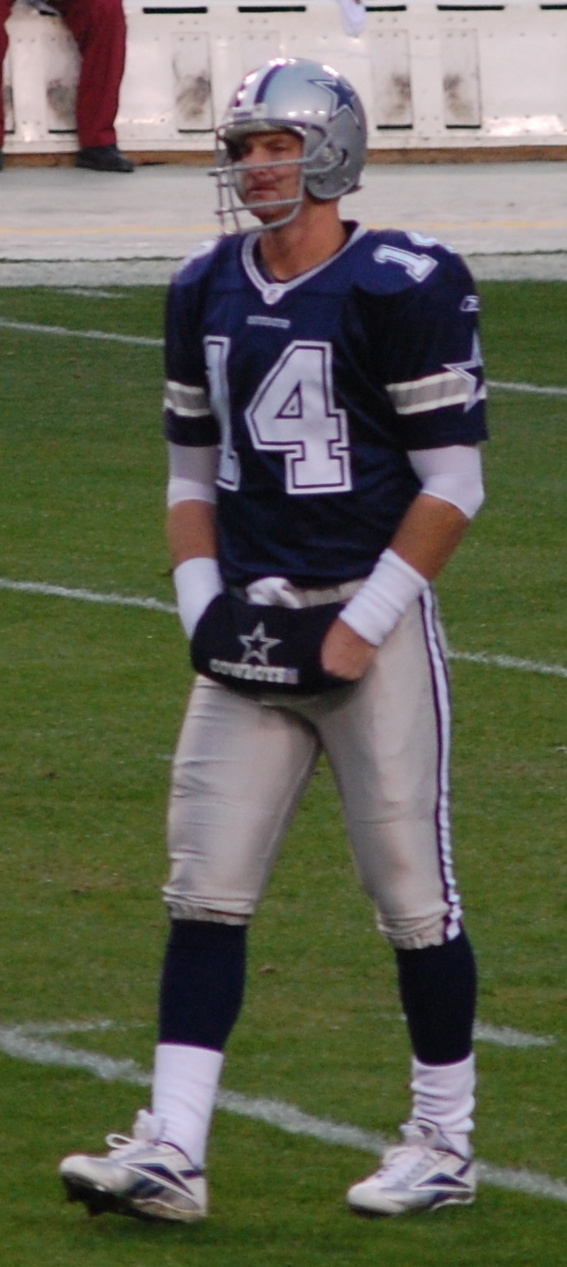
Brad Johnson (2001–2004)

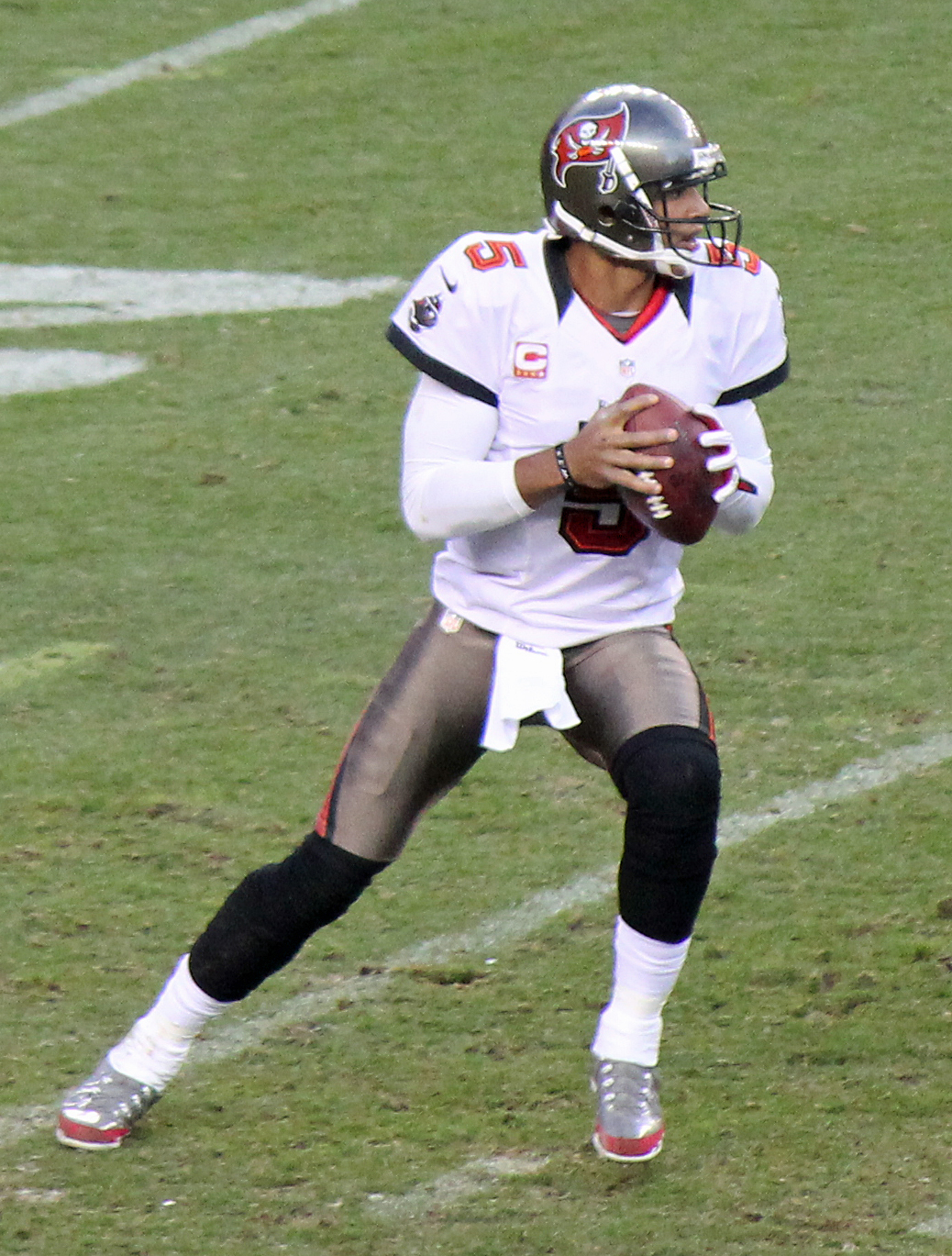
Josh Freeman (2009–2013)

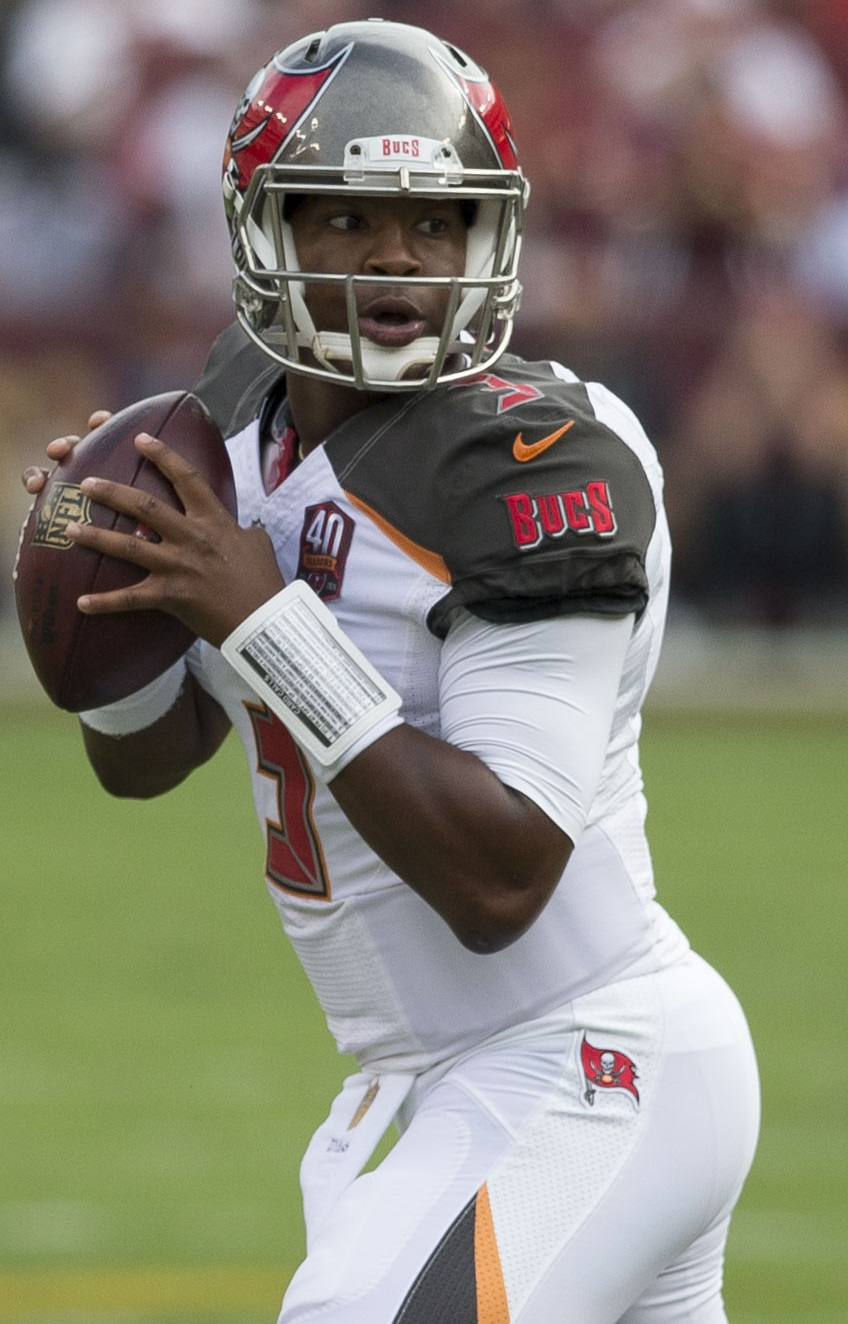
Jameis Winston (2015–2019)

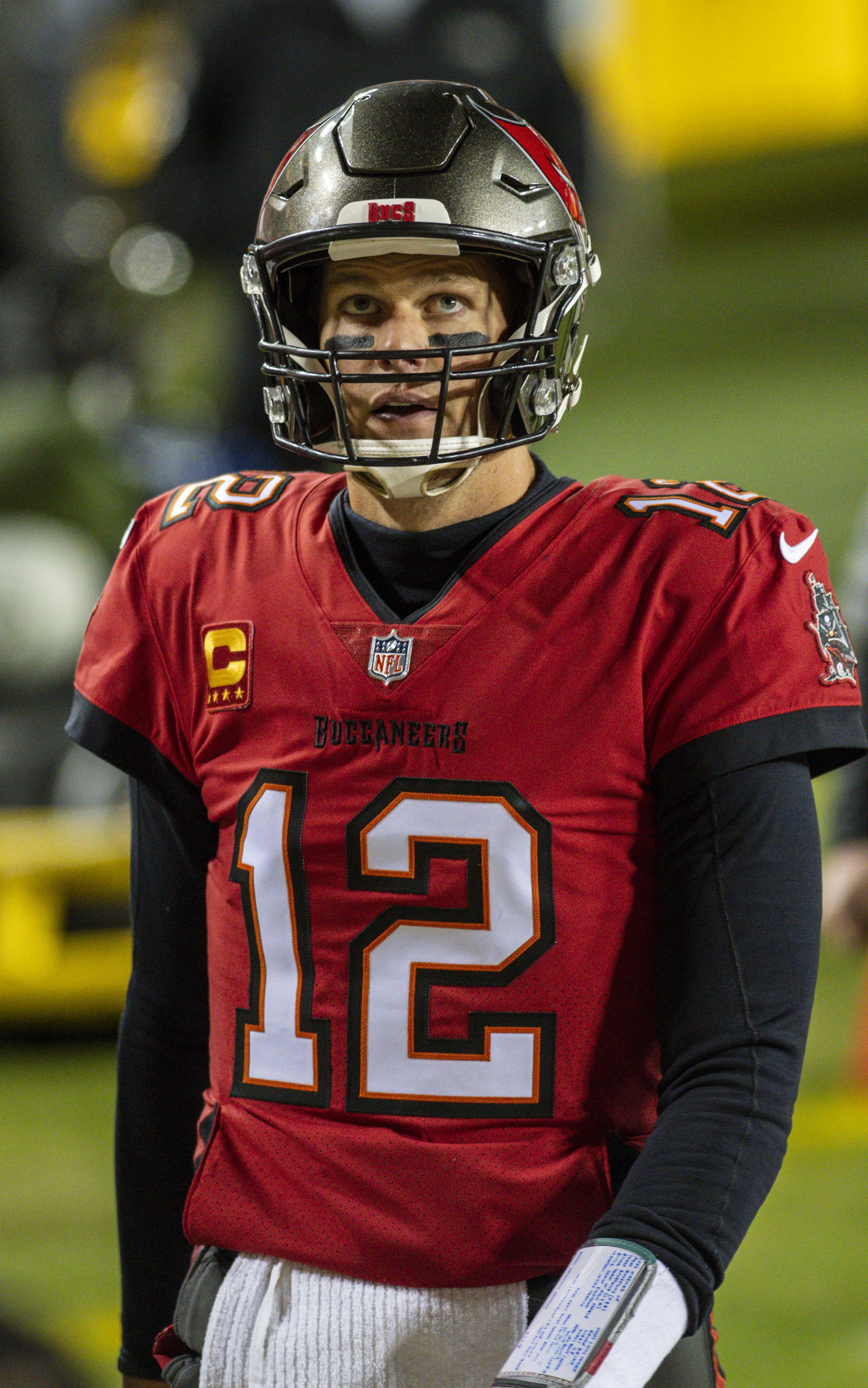
Tom Brady (2020–2022)

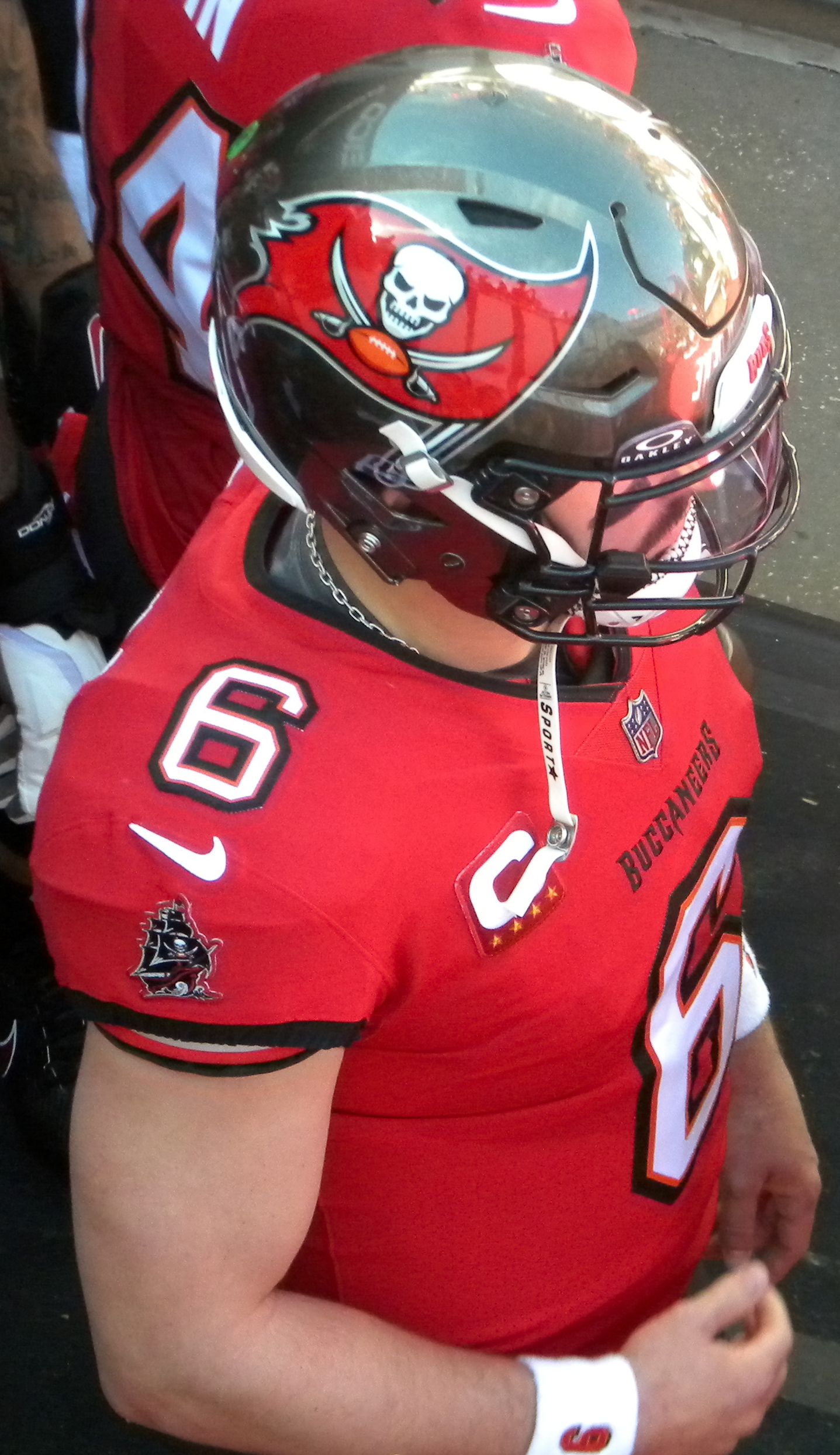
Baker Mayfield (2023–present)

Number of games started is listed in parentheses.

Season(s)	Quarterback (games)	Ref.
1976	Steve Spurrier (12) / Parnell Dickinson (1) / Terry Hanratty (1)	
1977	Randy Hedberg (4) / Gary Huff (6) / Jeb Blount (4)	
1978	Doug Williams (10) / Mike Boryla (1) / Mike Rae (5)	
1979	Doug Williams (16)	
1980	Doug Williams (16)	
1981	Doug Williams (16)	
1982	Doug Williams (9)	
1983	Jerry Golsteyn (3) / Jack Thompson (13)	
1984	Jack Thompson (3) / Steve DeBerg (13)	
1985	Steve DeBerg (11) / Steve Young (5)	
1986	Steve DeBerg (2) / Steve Young (14)	
1987	Steve DeBerg (8) / John Reaves (2) / Jim Zorn (1) / Vinny Testaverde (4)	
1988	Vinny Testaverde (15) / Joe Ferguson (1)	
1989	Vinny Testaverde (14) / Joe Ferguson (2)	
1990	Vinny Testaverde (13) / Chris Chandler (3)	
1991	Vinny Testaverde (12) / Chris Chandler (3) / Jeff Carlson (1)	
1992	Vinny Testaverde (14) / Steve DeBerg (2)	
1993	Steve DeBerg (1) / Craig Erickson (15)	
1994	Craig Erickson (14) / Trent Dilfer (2)	
1995	Trent Dilfer (16)	
1996	Trent Dilfer (16)	
1997	Trent Dilfer (16)	
1998	Trent Dilfer (16)	
1999	Trent Dilfer (10) / Shaun King (5) / Eric Zeier (1)	
2000	Shaun King (16)	
2001	Brad Johnson (16)	
2002	Brad Johnson (13) / Rob Johnson (2) / Shaun King (1)	
2003	Brad Johnson (16)	
2004	Brad Johnson (4) / Chris Simms (2) / Brian Griese (10)	
2005	Brian Griese (6) / Chris Simms (10)	
2006	Chris Simms (3) / Bruce Gradkowski (11) / Tim Rattay (2)	
2007	Jeff Garcia (13) / Luke McCown (3)	
2008	Jeff Garcia (11) / Brian Griese (5)	
2009	Byron Leftwich (3) / Josh Johnson (4) / Josh Freeman (9)	
2010	Josh Freeman (16)	
2011	Josh Freeman (15) / Josh Johnson (1)	
2012	Josh Freeman (16)	
2013	Josh Freeman (3) / Mike Glennon (13)	
2014	Josh McCown (11) / Mike Glennon (5)	
2015	Jameis Winston (16)	
2016	Jameis Winston (16)	
2017	Jameis Winston (13) / Ryan Fitzpatrick (3)	
2018	Jameis Winston (9) / Ryan Fitzpatrick (7)	
2019	Jameis Winston (16)	
2020	Tom Brady (16)	
2021	Tom Brady (17)	
2022	Tom Brady (17)	
2023	Baker Mayfield (17)	
2024	Baker Mayfield (17)	
2025	Baker Mayfield (17)	
2026	Baker Mayfield (3) / Jalon Daniels (3)	

== Postseason ==
Here is a list of Buccaneers starting quarterbacks during the postseason and the number of games they started.

Season(s)	Quarterback	Starts	Wins	Losses	Win %	Ref
1979–1982	Doug Williams	4	1	3	.250	
1997	Trent Dilfer	2	1	1	.500	
1999–2000	Shaun King	3	1	2	.330	
2001–2002	Brad Johnson	4	3	1	.750	
2005	Chris Simms	1	0	1	.000	
2007	Jeff Garcia	1	0	1	.000	
2020–2022	Tom Brady	7	5	2	.714	
2023–2024	Baker Mayfield	3	1	2	.333	
Totals		25	12	13	.480	

== Most games started ==
These quarterbacks have the most starts for the Buccaneers in regular season games.
Stats through the 2026 NFL season.

	Name	Period	Starts	Wins	Losses	Ties	Win %
1	Trent Dilfer	1994–1999	76	38	38	0	.500
2	Vinny Testaverde	1987–1992	72	24	48	0	.333
3	Jameis Winston	2015–2019	70	28	42	0	.400
4	Doug Williams	1978–1982	67	33	33	1	.500
5	Josh Freeman	2009–2012	56	24	32	0	.429
8	Baker Mayfield	2023–Present	53	27	26	0	.509
6	Tom Brady	2020–2022	50	32	18	0	.640
7	Brad Johnson	2001–2004	49	26	23	0	.536

== Team career passing records ==
(Through the 2026 NFL Season)

Name	Comp	Att	%	Yds	TD	Int	Rat
Jameis Winston	1,563	2,548	61.3	19,737	121	88	86.9
Tom Brady	1,376	2,062	66.7	14,632	108	33	98.0
Baker Mayfield	1,158	1,741	66.5	12,635	96	38	97.0
Josh Freeman	1,144	1,967	58.2	13,534	80	66	78.8
Vinny Testaverde	1,126	2,160	52.1	14,820	77	112	64.4
Trent Dilfer	1,117	2,038	54.8	12,969	70	80	69.4
Brad Johnson	1,040	1,683	61.8	10,940	64	41	83.2
Doug Williams	895	1,890	47.4	12,648	73	73	66.2
