= List of Calgary Stampeders starting quarterbacks =

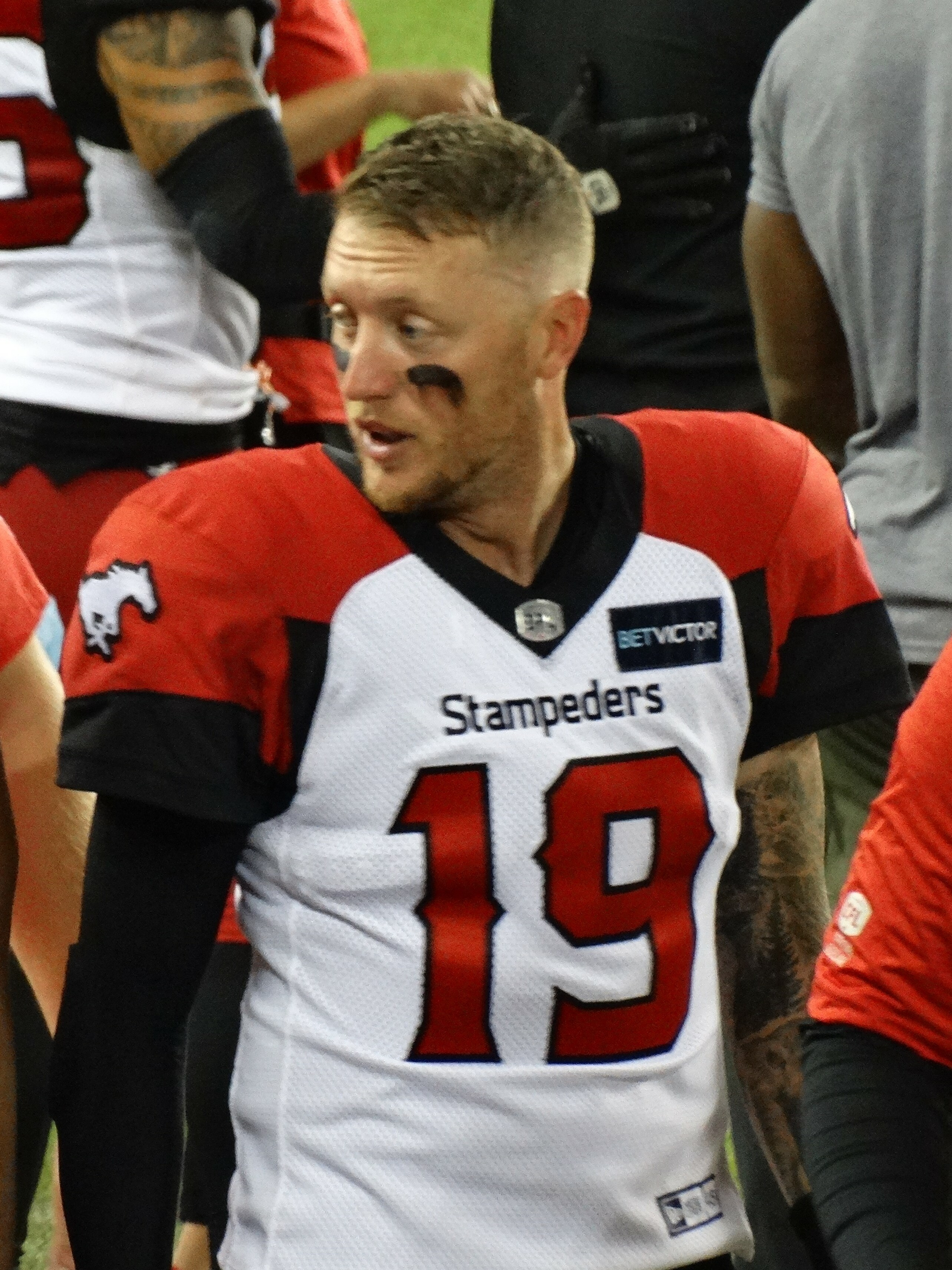
Bo Levi Mitchell is the only Stampeder to win two Grey Cups as a starting quarterback and has the most wins as a Calgary starter.

The following is an incomplete list of starting quarterbacks for the Calgary Stampeders of the Canadian Football League that have started a regular season game for the team. They are listed in order of appearance during the regular season or post-season, since 1990. Prior years do not include post-season starts and list number of starts from greatest to fewest.

== Starting quarterbacks by season ==
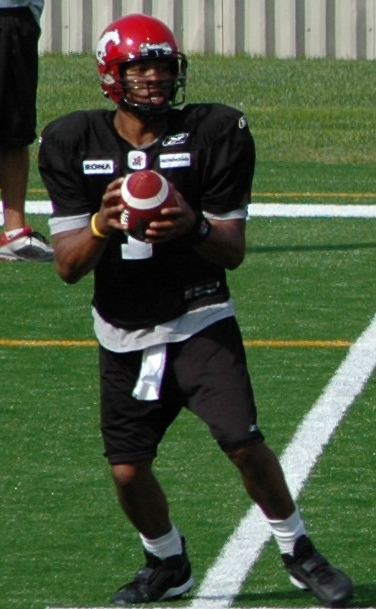
Henry Burris is the all-time franchise leader in quarterback starts and passing touchdowns.

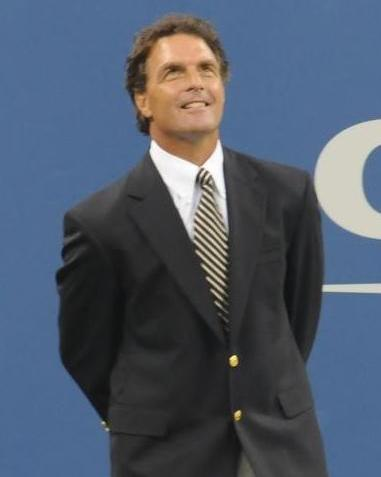
Doug Flutie won three CFL MOP Awards with the Stampeders.

Where known, the number of games they started during the season is listed to the right:

Season(s)	Regular season	Postseason
2026	Vernon Adams (17) / Josh Love (1)	
2025	Vernon Adams (17) / P. J. Walker (1)	Vernon Adams (1)
2024	Jake Maier (15) / Matthew Shiltz (2) / Logan Bonner (1)	
2023	Jake Maier (18)	Jake Maier (1)
2022	Bo Levi Mitchell (9) / Jake Maier (9)	Jake Maier (1)
2021	Bo Levi Mitchell (11) / Jake Maier (3)	Bo Levi Mitchell (1)
2020	Season cancelled due to COVID-19 pandemic	
2019	Bo Levi Mitchell (11) / Nick Arbuckle (7)	Bo Levi Mitchell (1)
2018	Bo Levi Mitchell (18)	Bo Levi Mitchell (2)
2017	Bo Levi Mitchell (17) / Andrew Buckley (1)	Bo Levi Mitchell (2)
2016	Bo Levi Mitchell (17) / Drew Tate (1)	Bo Levi Mitchell (2)
2015	Bo Levi Mitchell (17) / Drew Tate (1)	Bo Levi Mitchell (2)
2014	Bo Levi Mitchell (14) / Drew Tate (4)	Bo Levi Mitchell (2)
2013	Drew Tate (2) / Kevin Glenn (13) / Bo Levi Mitchell (3)	Kevin Glenn (1)
2012	Drew Tate (3) / Kevin Glenn (15)	Drew Tate (1) / Kevin Glenn (2)
2011	Henry Burris (15) / Drew Tate (3)	Drew Tate (1)
2010	Henry Burris (18)	Henry Burris (1)
2009	Henry Burris (18)	Henry Burris (2)
2008	Henry Burris (18)	Henry Burris (2)
2007	Henry Burris (14) / Akili Smith (2) / Ben Sankey (2)	Henry Burris (1)
2006	Henry Burris (18)	Henry Burris (1)
2005	Henry Burris (15) / Jason Gesser (2) / Danny Wimprine (2)	Henry Burris (1)
2004	Marcus Crandell (9) / Tommy Jones (5) / Khari Jones (3) / Mike Souza (1)	
2003	Marcus Crandell (9) / Kevin Feterik (5) / Scott Milanovich (2) / Keith Smith (1) / Cory Paus (1)	
2002	Marcus Crandell (16) / Ben Sankey (2)	
2001	Ben Sankey (6) / Marcus Crandell (12)	Marcus Crandell (3)
2000	Dave Dickenson (16) / Troy Kopp (2)	Dave Dickenson (1)
1999	Dave Dickenson (11) / Henry Burris (2) / Mike McCoy (5)	Dave Dickenson (3)
1998	Jeff Garcia (17) / Dave Dickenson (1)	Jeff Garcia (2)
1997	Jeff Garcia (17) / Dave Dickenson (1)	Jeff Garcia (1)
1996	Jeff Garcia (18)	Jeff Garcia (1)
1995	Doug Flutie (10) / Jeff Garcia (8)	Doug Flutie (3)
1994	Doug Flutie (18)	Doug Flutie (2)
1993	Doug Flutie (18)	Doug Flutie (2)
1992	Doug Flutie (18)	Doug Flutie (2)
1991	Danny Barrett (11) / Steve Taylor (4) / Gilbert Renfroe (3)	Danny Barrett (3)
1990	Danny Barrett (11) / Rick Worman (6) / Terrence Jones (1)	Danny Barrett (1)
1989	Danny Barrett (8) / Terrence Jones (8) / Tom Porras (2)	
1988	Rick Worman (9) / Erik Kramer (5) / Rick Johnson (2) / Carl Fodor (2)	
1987	Rick Johnson (9) / Rick Worman (9)	
1986	Rick Johnson (18)	

== Team passer rankings ==
Quarterbacks are listed by number of starts for Calgary Stampeders.

Name	GS	W–L–T	Comp	Att	Pct	Yards	TD	Int
Henry Burris	118	71–45–2	2,267	3,677	61.7	32,191	203	111
Bo Levi Mitchell	117	90–25–2	2,496	3,866	64.6	32,541	188	89
Jerry Keeling	72	38–32–2	937	1,788	52.4	13,300	89	127
Eagle Day	67	44–21–2	818	1,392	58.8	11,810	61	56
Peter Liske	64	34–30–0	1,145	1,971	58.1	16,741	106	101
Doug Flutie	63	50–13–0	1,438	2,382	60.4	20,551	140	71
Jeff Garcia	61	42–19–0	1,250	2,024	61.8	16,449	111	53
Marcus Crandell	46	16–30–0	865	1,565	55.3	11,887	57	60
Jake Maier	45	18–26–1	1,022	1,497	68.3	11,685	60	39
Ken Johnson	41	27–14–0	620	1,079	57.5	8,427	58	38
