= List of Seattle Seahawks starting quarterbacks =

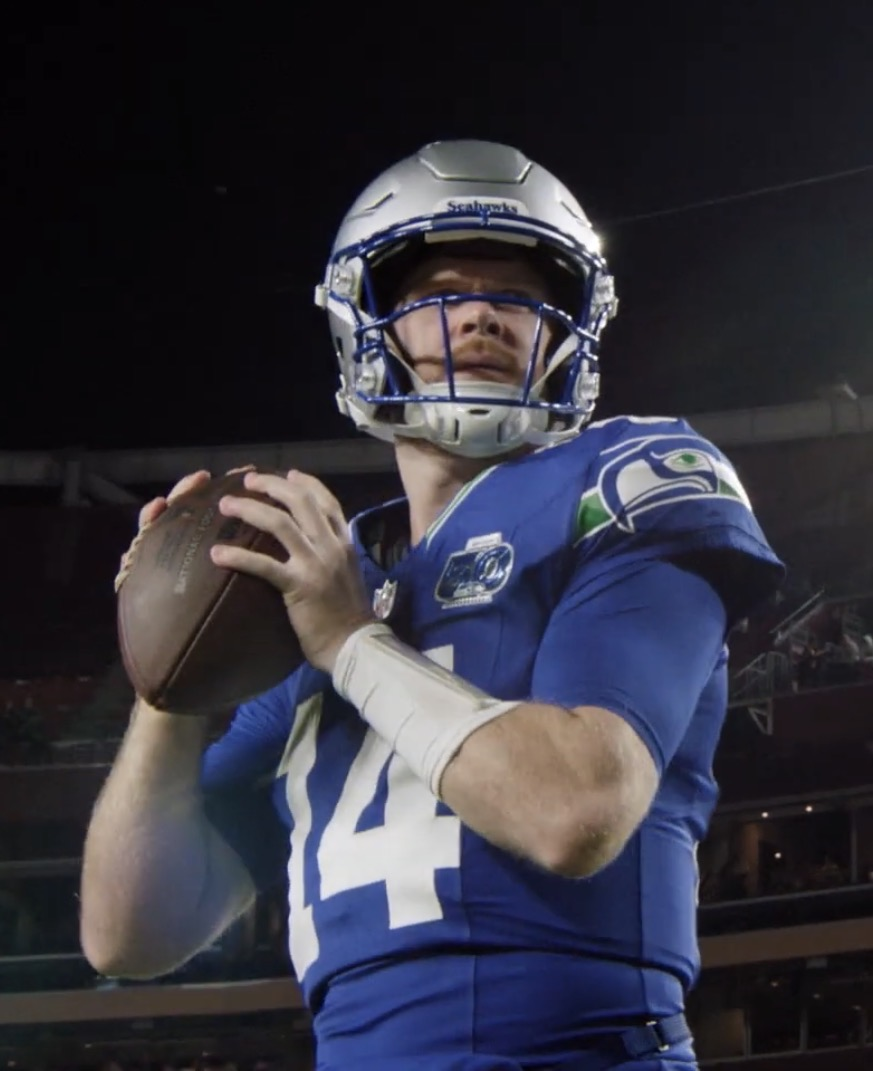
Sam Darnold (2025–present)

These quarterbacks have started at least one game for the Seattle Seahawks of the National Football League.

== Starting quarterbacks ==
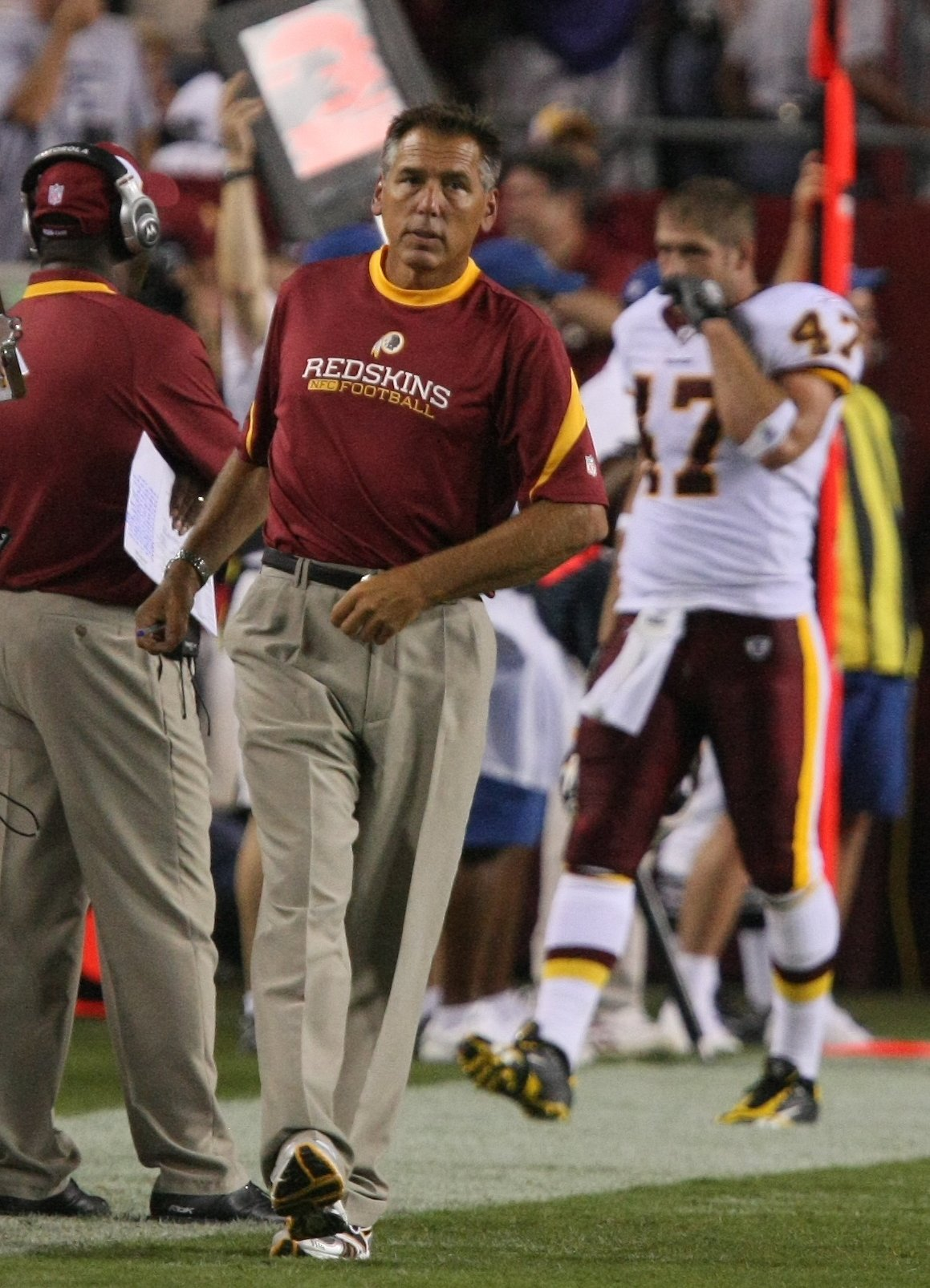
Jim Zorn (1976–1984)

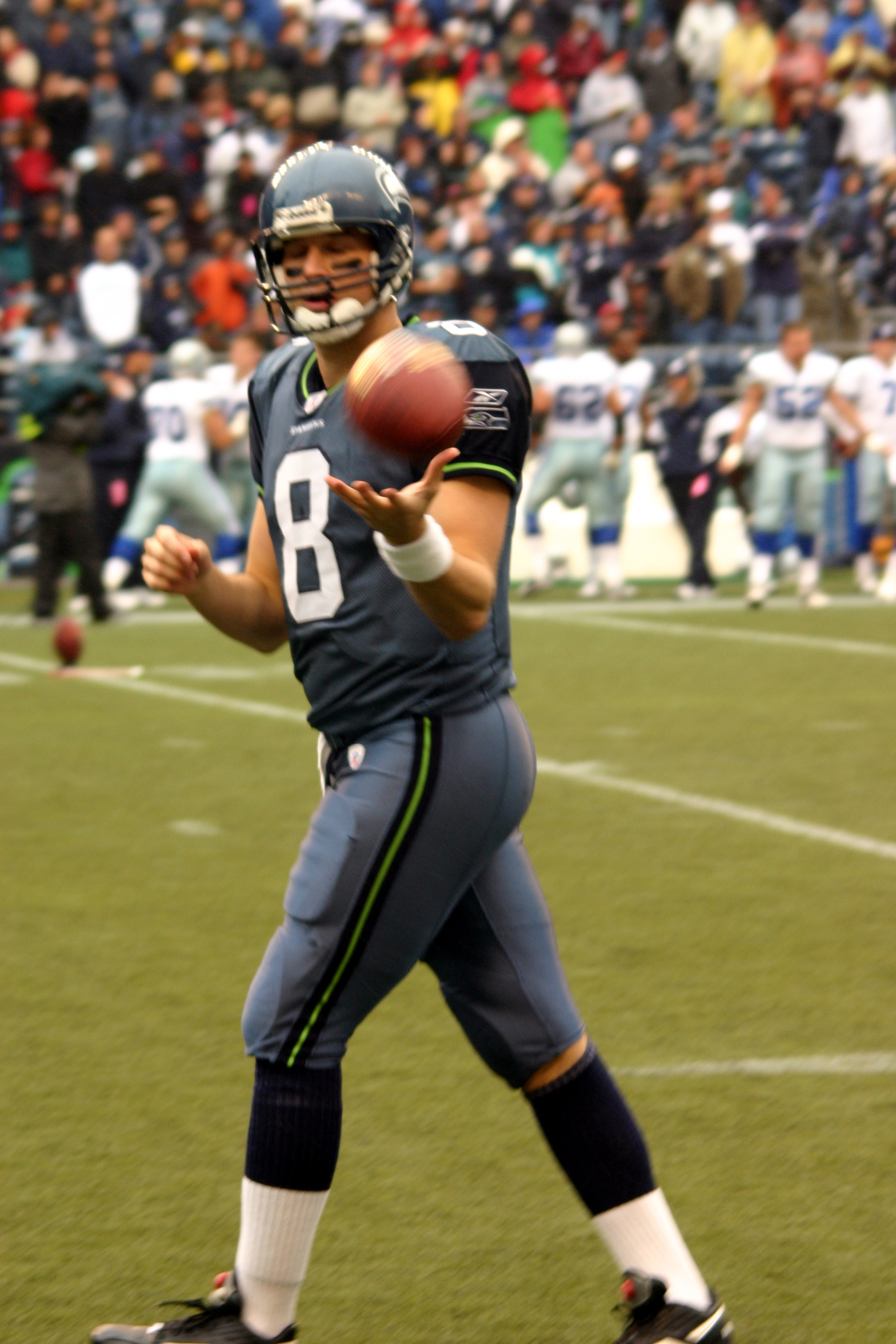
Matt Hasselbeck (2001–2010)

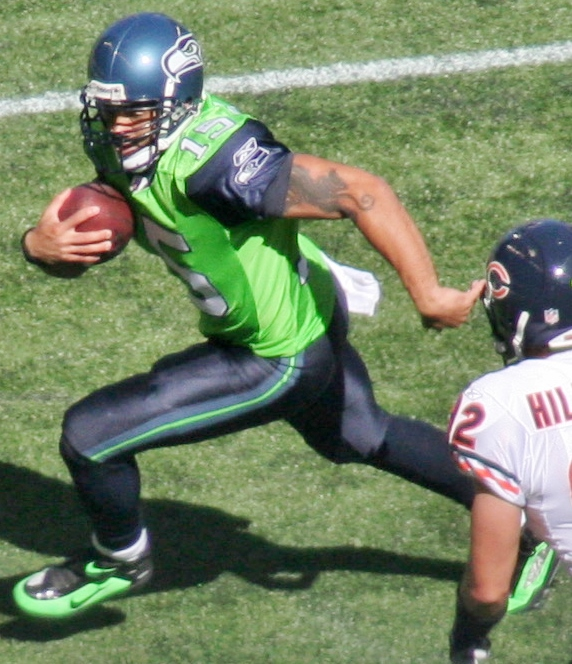
Seneca Wallace (2006, 2008–2009)

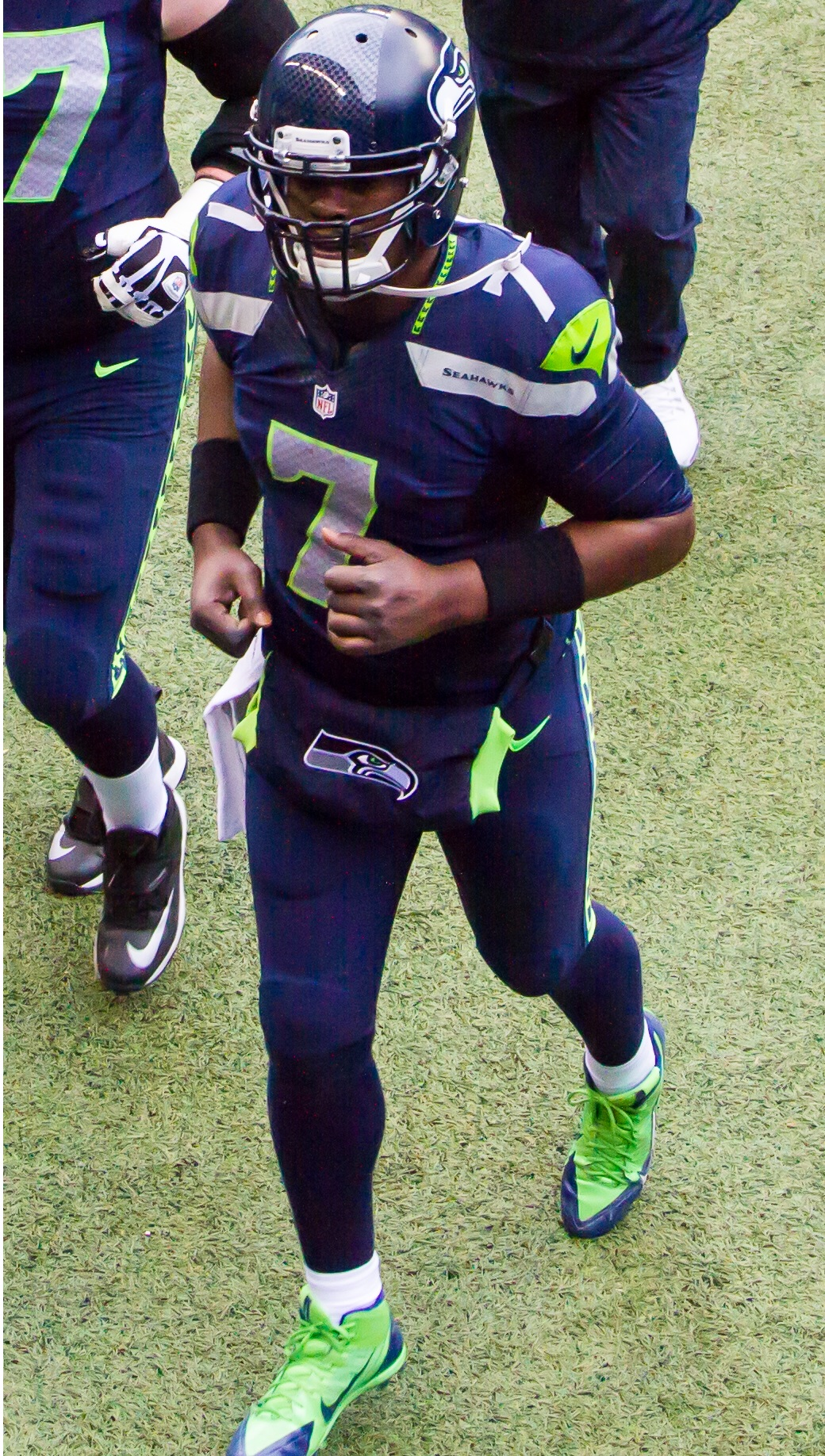
Tarvaris Jackson (2011)

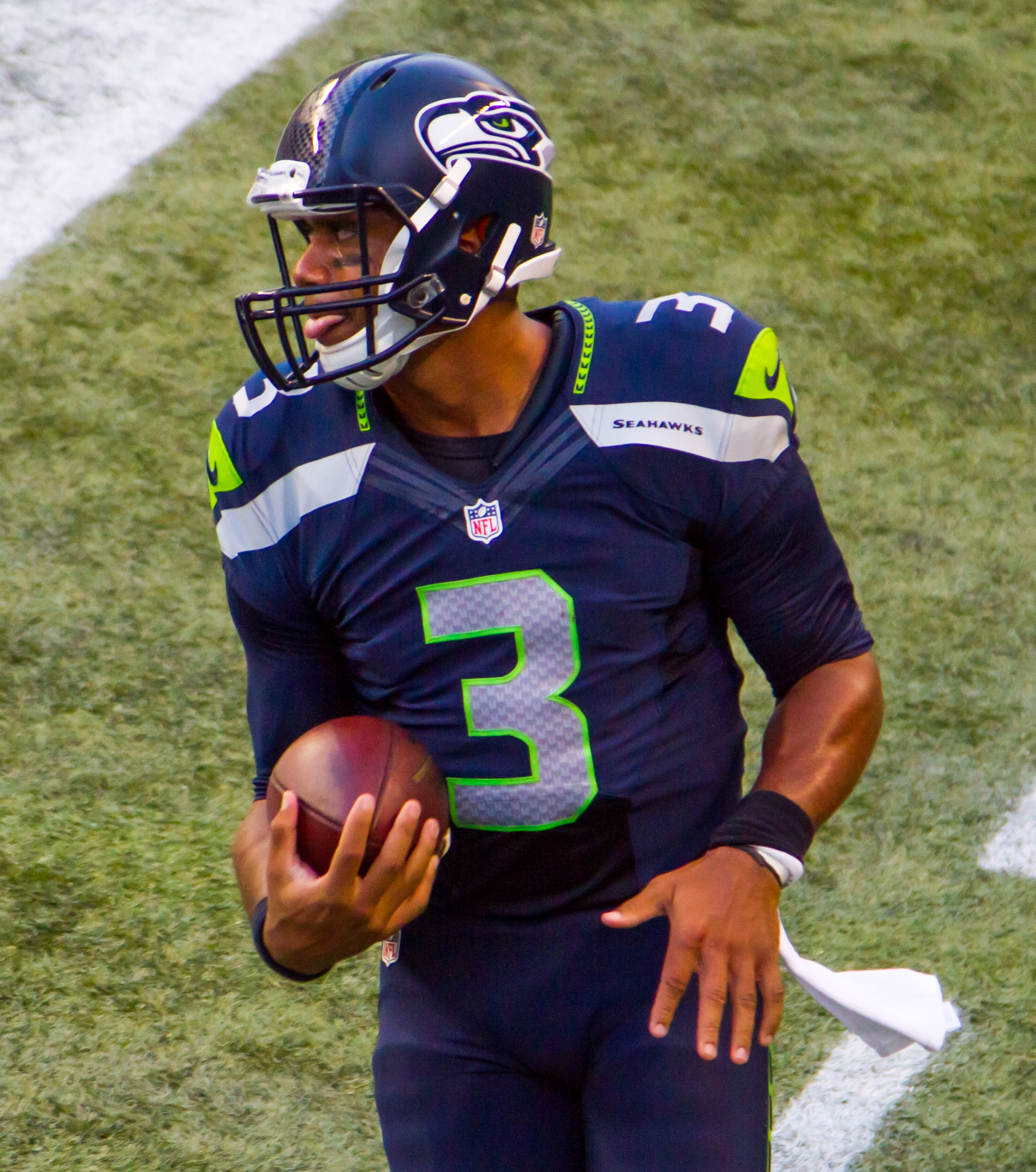
Russell Wilson (2012–2021)

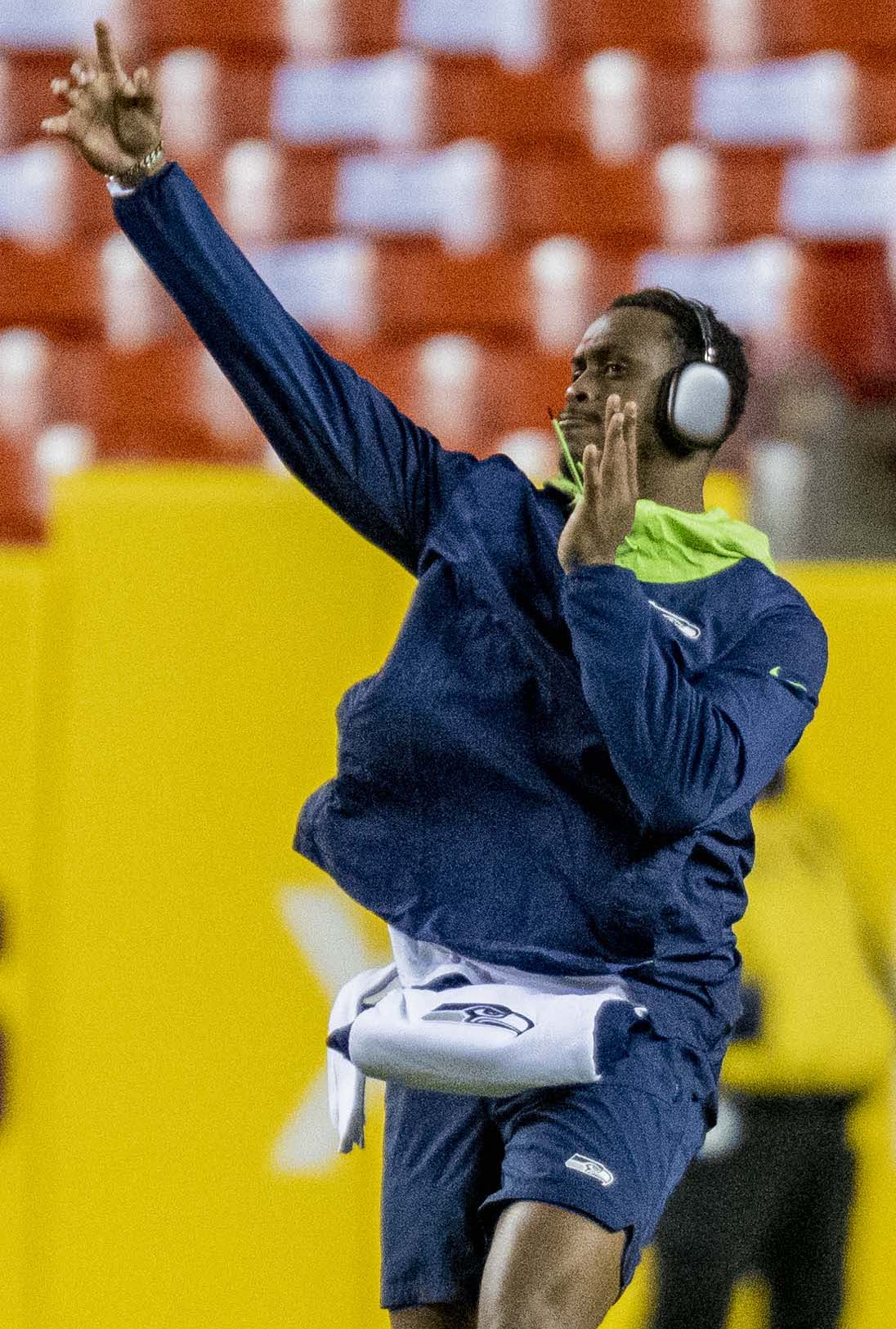
Geno Smith (2021–2024)

The number of games they started during the season is listed to the right:

=== Regular season ===
Season(s)	Quarterback(s)	References
1976	Jim Zorn (14)	
1977	Jim Zorn (10) / Steve Myer (4)	
1978	Jim Zorn (16)	
1979	Jim Zorn (16)	
1980	Jim Zorn (16)	
1981	Jim Zorn (13) / Dave Krieg (3)	
1982	Jim Zorn (7) / Dave Krieg (2)	
1983	Dave Krieg (8) / Jim Zorn (8)	
1984	Dave Krieg (16)	
1985	Dave Krieg (16)	
1986	Dave Krieg (14) / Gale Gilbert (2)	
1987	Dave Krieg (12) / Bruce Mathison (2) / Jeff Kemp (1)	
1988	Dave Krieg (9) / Kelly Stouffer (6) / Jeff Kemp (1)	
1989	Dave Krieg (14) / Kelly Stouffer (2)	
1990	Dave Krieg (16)	
1991	Dave Krieg (9) / Jeff Kemp (5) / Dan McGwire (1) / Kelly Stouffer (1)	
1992	Stan Gelbaugh (8) / Kelly Stouffer (7) / Dan McGwire (1)	
1993	Rick Mirer (16)	
1994	Rick Mirer (13) / Dan McGwire (3)	
1995	Rick Mirer (13) / John Friesz (3)	
1996	Rick Mirer (9) / John Friesz (6) / Stan Gelbaugh (1)	
1997	Warren Moon (14) / Jon Kitna (1) / John Friesz (1)	
1998	Warren Moon (10) / Jon Kitna (5) / John Friesz (1)	
1999	Jon Kitna (15) / Glenn Foley (1)	
2000	Jon Kitna (12) / Brock Huard (4)	
2001	Matt Hasselbeck (12) / Trent Dilfer (4)	
2002	Matt Hasselbeck (10) / Trent Dilfer (6)	
2003	Matt Hasselbeck (16)	
2004	Matt Hasselbeck (14) / Trent Dilfer (2)	
2005	Matt Hasselbeck (16)	
2006	Matt Hasselbeck (12) / Seneca Wallace (4)	
2007	Matt Hasselbeck (16)	
2008	Seneca Wallace (8) / Matt Hasselbeck (7) / Charlie Frye (1)	
2009	Matt Hasselbeck (14) / Seneca Wallace (2)	
2010	Matt Hasselbeck (14) / Charlie Whitehurst (2)	
2011	Tarvaris Jackson (14) / Charlie Whitehurst (2)	
2012	Russell Wilson (16)	
2013	Russell Wilson (16)	
2014	Russell Wilson (16)	
2015	Russell Wilson (16)	
2016	Russell Wilson (16)	
2017	Russell Wilson (16)	
2018	Russell Wilson (16)	
2019	Russell Wilson (16)	
2020	Russell Wilson (16)	
2021	Russell Wilson (14) / Geno Smith (3)	
2022	Geno Smith (17)	
2023	Geno Smith (15) / Drew Lock (2)	
2024	Geno Smith (17)	
2025	Sam Darnold (17)	
2026	Sam Darnold (2) / Drew Lock (1)	

=== Postseason ===
Season	Quarterback(s)	Ref(s)
1983	Dave Krieg (2–1)	
1984	Dave Krieg (1–1)	
1987	Dave Krieg (0–1)	
1988	Dave Krieg (0–1)	
1999	Jon Kitna (0–1)	
2003	Matt Hasselbeck (0–1)	
2004	Matt Hasselbeck (0–1)	
2005	Matt Hasselbeck (2–1)	
2006	Matt Hasselbeck (1–1)	
2007	Matt Hasselbeck (1–1)	
2010	Matt Hasselbeck (1–1)	
2012	Russell Wilson (1–1)	
2013	Russell Wilson (3–0)	
2014	Russell Wilson (2–1)	
2015	Russell Wilson (1–1)	
2016	Russell Wilson (1–1)	
2018	Russell Wilson (0–1)	
2019	Russell Wilson (1–1)	
2020	Russell Wilson (0–1)	
2022	Geno Smith (0–1)	
2025	Sam Darnold (3–0)	

== Most games as starting quarterback ==
These quarterbacks have the most starts for the Seahawks in regular season games (through the 2025 season).

Name	
GP	Games played
GS	Games started
W	Number of wins as starting quarterback
L	Number of losses as starting quarterback
T	Number of ties as starting quarterback
Pct	Winning percentage as starting quarterback

Name	Period	GP	GS	W	L	T	%
Russell Wilson	2012–2021	158	158	104	53	1	.658
Matt Hasselbeck	2001–2010	138	131	69	62	—	.527
Dave Krieg	1980–1991	129	119	70	49	—	.588
Jim Zorn	1976–1984	126	100	40	60	—	.400
Geno Smith	2021–2024	54	52	28	24	—	.538
Rick Mirer	1993–1996	55	51	20	31	—	.392
Jon Kitna	1997–2000	39	33	18	15	—	.545

== Team career passing records ==
(Through the 2024 season)

Name	Comp	Att	%	Yds	TD	Int
Russell Wilson	3,079	4,735	65.0	37,059	292	87
Matt Hasselbeck	2,559	4,250	60.2	29,434	174	128
Dave Krieg	2,096	3,576	58.6	26,132	195	148
Jim Zorn	1,593	2,990	53.3	20,122	107	133
Geno Smith	1,198	1,749	68.5	12,961	76	36
Rick Mirer	814	1,523	53.4	9,094	41	56
Jon Kitna	658	1,130	58.2	7,552	49	45

== See also ==
- List of NFL starting quarterbacks
