= Free (surname) =

Free is a surname. Notable people with the surname include:

- Ana Free (born 1987), Portuguese musician
- Ann Cottrell Free (1916–2004), American journalist
- Arthur M. Free (1879–1953), American politician
- Chandra Free (born 1981), American comic book writer and artist
- Charlotte Free (born 1992), American Supermodel, Musician
- Doug Free (born 1984), American football offensive tackle
- Duncan Free (born 1973), Australian rower and Olympic medalist
- Edgar Free (1872–1938), Australian politician
- Edward Drax Free (1764–1843), English clergyman
- Ernest Free (1867–1946), Australian cricketer
- F. William Free (1928–2003), American advertising executive
- Gavin Free (born 1988), English filmmaker
- Helen Murray Free (1923–2021), American chemist and educator
- James S. Free (1908–1996), American journalist
- John Free (1944-2024), American Photographer
- Kalyn Free, American attorney
- Karl R. Free (1903–1947), American artist and curator
- Lloyd A. Free (1908–1996), American pollster
- Marcella Free (1920–2007), American copywriter
- Micki Free, American guitarist
- Nell Tiger Free (born 1999), English actress
- Peter Free (born 1971), Australian cricketer
- Ray D. Free (1910–2002), American major general and Utah House of Representatives member
- Ross Free (born 1943), Australian politician
- Steve Free (born 1950), American musician
- Tony Free, Australian rules football player
- Travon Free, American comedian, actor, television writer, and former basketball player
- World B. Free (born Lloyd Bernard Free, 1953), American basketball player
