= Russell Wilson =

American football player (born 1988)

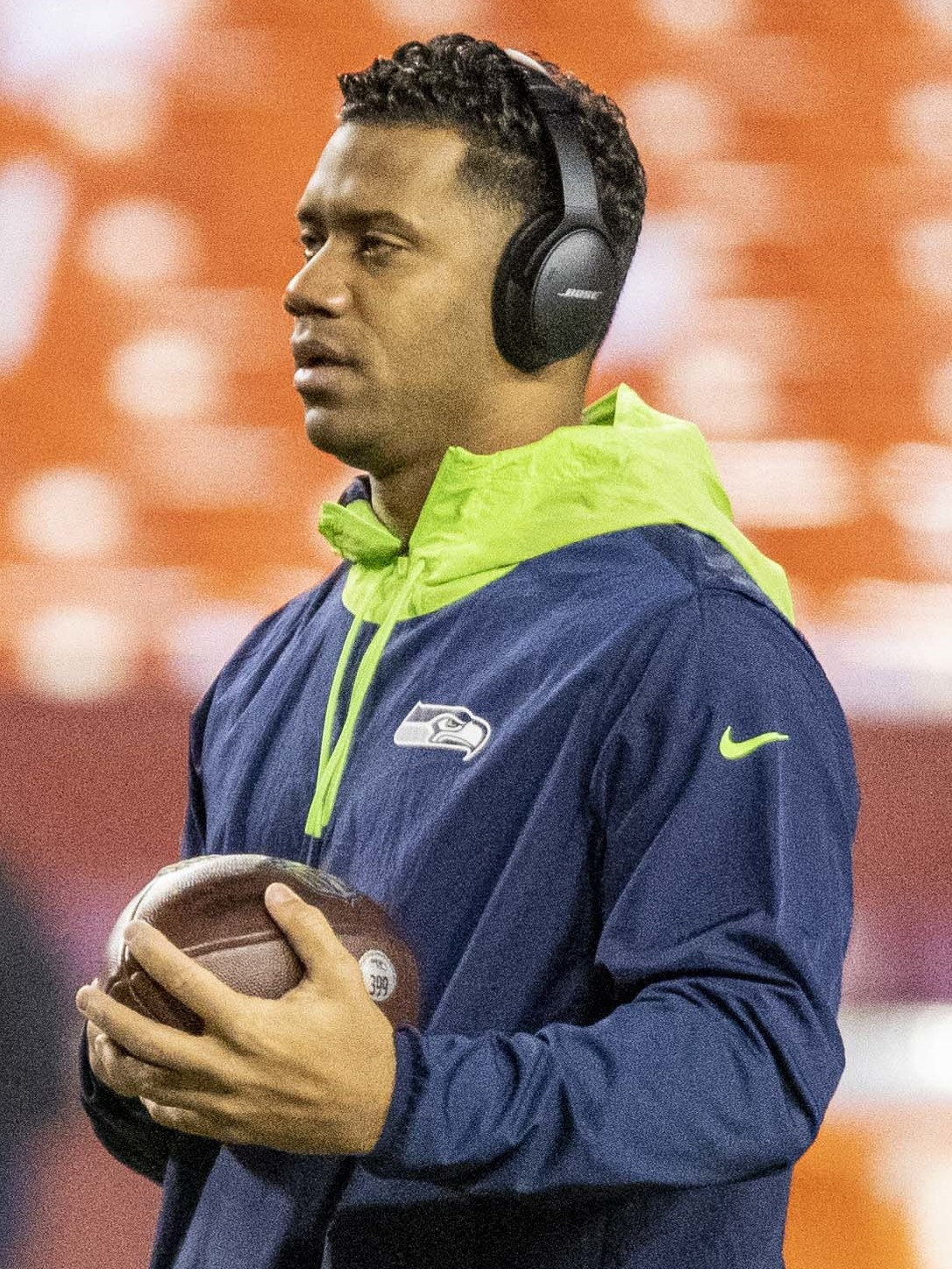
- Wilson with the Seattle Seahawks in 2021

No. 3
- Position: Quarterback

Personal information
- Born: November 29, 1988 (age 37); Cincinnati, Ohio, U.S.
- Listed height: 5 ft 11 in (1.80 m)
- Listed weight: 206 lb (93 kg)

Career information
- High school: Collegiate School (Richmond, Virginia)
- College: NC State (2007–2010); Wisconsin (2011)
- NFL draft: 2012: 3rd round, 75th overall pick

Career history
- Seattle Seahawks (2012–2021); Denver Broncos (2022–2023); Pittsburgh Steelers (2024); New York Giants (2025)

Awards and highlights
- Super Bowl champion (XLVIII); Walter Payton NFL Man of the Year (2020); Pepsi NFL Rookie of the Year (2012); Second-team All-Pro (2019); 10× Pro Bowl (2012–2015, 2017–2021, 2024); NFL passer rating leader (2015); NFL passing touchdowns leader (2017); Seattle Seahawks Top 50 players; Big Ten Quarterback of the Year (2011); NCAA passer rating leader (2011); First-team All-Big Ten (2011); ACC Rookie of the Year (2008); ACC Offensive Rookie of the Year (2008); First-team All-ACC (2008); Second-team All-ACC (2010); NC State Wolfpack jersey No. 16 honored

Career NFL statistics
- Passing attempts: 6,120
- Passing completions: 3,951
- Completion percentage: 64.6%
- TD–INT: 353–114
- Passing yards: 46,966
- Passer rating: 99.3
- Rushing yards: 5,568
- Rushing touchdowns: 31
- Stats at Pro Football Reference

Russell Carrington Wilson (born November 29, 1988) is an American sportscaster and former professional football quarterback who played 14 seasons in the National Football League (NFL), primarily with the Seattle Seahawks. Regarded as one of the greatest dual-threat quarterbacks in history, Wilson was named to the Pro Bowl ten times and helped the Seahawks win their first Super Bowl championship in Super Bowl XLVIII. He is also a former professional baseball player.

Wilson played both college football and baseball for the NC State Wolfpack from 2008 to 2010 before transferring to the Wisconsin Badgers in 2011, where he set the single-season FBS record for passer rating and led them to a Big Ten title and the 2012 Rose Bowl. He also played minor league baseball for the Tri-City Dust Devils in 2010 and the Asheville Tourists in 2011 as a second baseman. The Seattle Seahawks selected Wilson in the third round (75th overall) of the 2012 NFL draft. He tied the rookie record for most passing touchdowns and was named Pepsi NFL Rookie of the Year. Wilson led the Seahawks to consecutive Super Bowl appearances over the next two seasons, winning Super Bowl XLVIII and losing Super Bowl XLIX. He led the team to eight total playoff appearances with four division titles.

Wilson holds the record for most wins by an NFL quarterback through nine seasons and is one of five quarterbacks with a career passer rating over 99. In 2019, he signed a four-year, $140 million contract extension with the Seahawks, becoming the highest-paid NFL player at the time. In 2020, he became the third quarterback in NFL history to throw 30 touchdowns in four consecutive seasons. Wilson was traded to the Denver Broncos in 2022 and later signed a five-year, $245 million extension. His time with the Broncos was largely unsuccessful, with the Broncos having the league's worst scoring offense in 2022. Wilson was benched near the end of the 2023 season and was released in the offseason, later signing a one-year deal with the Pittsburgh Steelers for 2024, where he earned his tenth Pro Bowl selection. The next season, he signed a one-year contract with the New York Giants. In 2026, he retired from the NFL to join CBS Sports as a sportscaster. He retired as the only quarterback with both 40,000 passing yards and 5,000 rushing yards.

Noted for his philanthropy, Wilson was named the Walter Payton Man of the Year in 2020 and was the recipient of the Bart Starr Award in 2022. Wilson is also part owner of the Seattle Sounders FC of Major League Soccer (MLS). After he purchased his minority stake, the Sounders won MLS Cup 2019 and the 2022 CONCACAF Champions League.

== Early life and background ==
Wilson was born at The Christ Hospital in Cincinnati, and grew up in Richmond, Virginia. His parents are Harrison Benjamin Wilson III, a lawyer, and Tammy Wilson (née Turner), a nurse director. He has an older brother, Harrison IV, and a younger sister, Anna. Wilson started playing football with his father and brother at the age of four, and played his first organized game for the Tuckahoe Tomahawks youth football team in sixth grade.

Wilson's great-great-grandfather was enslaved to a Confederate colonel and was freed after the American Civil War. Wilson's paternal grandfather, Harrison B. Wilson Jr., was a former president of Norfolk State University who played football and basketball at Kentucky State University, and his paternal grandmother, Anna W. Wilson, was on the faculty at Jackson State University. Wilson's maternal grandfather was noted painter A. B. Jackson. According to genetic admixture analysis, Wilson is 62% African, 36% European, 1% West Asian, and 1% Central Asian. His European family lineage has been traced back to 524 A.D. to Saint Arnulf of Metz via Charlemagne. Wilson has also said he has some Native American ancestry, although he did not explicitly say which tribe he came from.

Wilson's father played football and baseball at Dartmouth and was a wide receiver for the San Diego Chargers preseason squad in 1980. Wilson's brother, Harry, played football and baseball at the University of Richmond, and his sister Anna played basketball at Stanford.

Wilson's father died of complications from diabetes on June 9, 2010, at age 55, the day after Wilson was drafted by the Colorado Rockies.

== High school career ==
Wilson attended Collegiate School, a preparatory school in Richmond, Virginia. As a junior in 2005, he threw for 3,287 passing yards and 40 passing touchdowns and rushed for 634 rushing yards and 15 rushing touchdowns. He was named an all-district, all-region, and all-state player. Wilson was twice named the Richmond Times-Dispatch Player of the Year.

As a senior, he threw for 3,009 passing yards, 34 passing touchdowns, and seven interceptions. In addition, he rushed for 1,132 yards and 18 touchdowns. That year, he was named an all-conference and all-state player as well as conference player of the year. He was featured in Sports Illustrated for his performance in the state championship game win. Wilson also served as his senior class president.

During his time in high school, Wilson attended the Manning Passing Academy, a summer football clinic run by multiple NFL MVP winner and eventual Hall of Fame quarterback Peyton Manning. Due to this encounter, Manning recognized Wilson many years later when the latter had flown to Denver to discuss the prospect of getting drafted by the Denver Broncos, where Manning had recently signed.

Wilson was also a member of the Collegiate School basketball and baseball teams.

College recruiting
Name	Hometown	School	Height	Weight	40^{‡}	Commit date
Russell Wilson; QB	Richmond, Virginia	Collegiate School	5 ft 11 in (1.80 m)	205 lb (93 kg)	4.53	Jul 23, 2006
Russell Wilson; QB	Recruit ratings: Scout: Rivals:					
Overall recruit ranking: Scout: 67 (QB) Rivals: NR (QB), NR (Virginia)
‡ Refers to 40-yard dash; Note: In many cases, Scout, Rivals, 247Sports, On3, and ESPN may conflict in their listings of height, weight and 40 time.; In these cases, the average was taken. ESPN grades are on a 100-point scale.; Sources: "2007 Team Ranking". Rivals.com.

Wilson committed to North Carolina State University. He was recruited by Curt Cignetti. He also received a football scholarship offer from Duke University.

== College football career ==
=== NC State ===
Wilson redshirted during the 2007 season at NC State. In 2008, Wilson initially split time at quarterback with senior Daniel Evans and junior Harrison Beck. However, Evans and Beck saw no regular season action after Week 2 and Week 5, respectively. Thereafter, Wilson led the team to a 4–3 record in the regular season which NC State finished out on a four-game winning streak. During a 30–24 win over the East Carolina Pirates, Wilson threw for 201 yards and three touchdowns. He threw for two touchdowns in each of the last six games in the regular season.

In the 2008 PapaJohns.com Bowl against the Rutgers Scarlet Knights, Wilson threw for 186 yards and a touchdown and rushed for 46 yards before halftime. Late in the first half, he scrambled to the Rutgers' four-yard line, where he was tackled and suffered a knee sprain. With Wilson sitting out the remainder of the game, his replacements threw a combined total of three interceptions with NC State, eventually losing 29–23. Over the course of the season, he completed 150 of 275 attempts for 1,955 yards and 17 touchdowns with just one interception. He also recorded 116 carries for 394 yards and four touchdowns. The Atlantic Coast Conference (ACC) named him the first-team All-ACC quarterback. It was the first time in conference history that a freshman quarterback was named to the first team.

Prior to the 2009 season, Wilson was named quarterback of the pre-season all-ACC football team on July 12. On September 19, Wilson broke Andre' Woodson's all-time NCAA record of 325 consecutive pass attempts without an interception against Gardner–Webb Runnin' Bulldogs. The 379-pass streak ended in a game against the Wake Forest Demon Deacons on October 3. On October 31, he passed for 349 yards, five touchdowns, and two interceptions against the Florida State Seminoles. Wilson held the record until November 10, 2012, when it was broken by Louisiana Tech quarterback Colby Cameron. Wilson was named honorable mention All-ACC in 2009. Wilson finished the 2009 regular season with 3,027 passing yards, 31 touchdowns, and 11 interceptions as the team finished with a 5–7 record.

Wilson led the 2010 Wolfpack to a 9–4 season that included a 23–7 win over the West Virginia Mountaineers in the 2010 Champs Sports Bowl. He led the ACC in passing yards per game (274.1) and total offensive yards per game (307.5). He was named second-team All-ACC and runner-up for ACC Football Player of the Year. In May 2010, Wilson graduated from NC State in three years with a BA in communication, and took graduate-level business courses in the fall semester during the 2010 football season.

==== Transfer ====
In January 2011, Wilson announced that he would report to spring training with the Colorado Rockies organization. NC State head coach Tom O'Brien expressed reservations with Wilson's decision, saying "Russell and I have had very open conversations about his responsibilities respective to baseball and football. While I am certainly respectful of Russell's dedication to baseball these last several years, within those discussions I also communicated to him the importance of his time commitment to NC State football."

O'Brien and his staff reached out to NFL coaches and general managers on Wilson's behalf, but he failed to receive an invitation to the 2011 NFL Scouting Combine.

On April 29, 2011, O'Brien announced that Wilson was granted a release from his football scholarship with one year of eligibility left.

=== Wisconsin ===
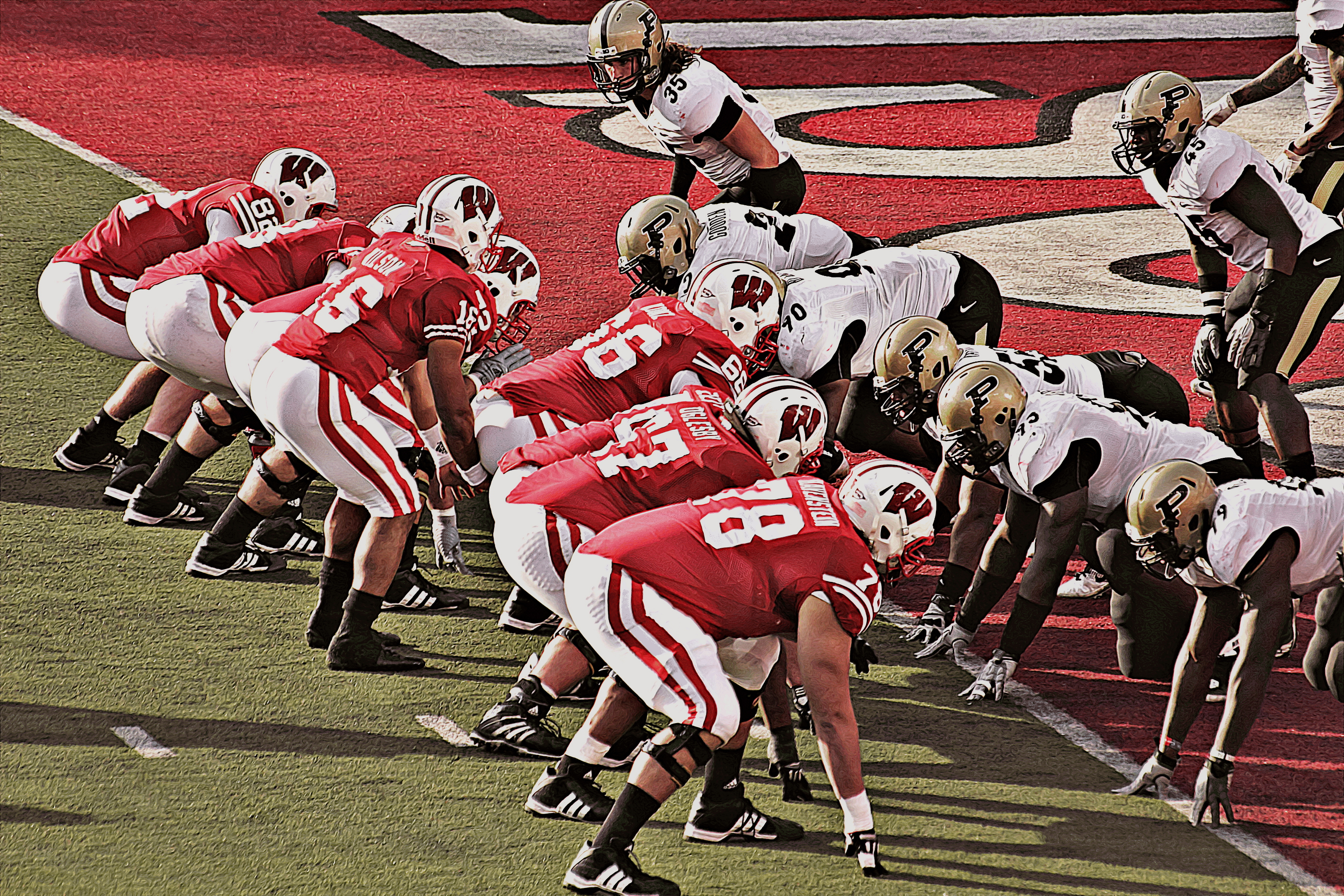
Wilson and the Badgers threaten the Purdue Boilermakers end zone in 2011.

On June 27, 2011, Wisconsin head coach Bret Bielema said that Wilson committed to Wisconsin for the 2011 season. In the season opener against the UNLV Rebels, Wilson passed for 255 yards and two touchdowns in a 51–17 victory. He also rushed for 62 yards, including a 46-yard touchdown run. In the next three games, Wilson threw for three passing touchdowns in each game, victories over the Oregon State Beavers, the Northern Illinois Huskies, and the South Dakota Coyotes. Following a 48–17 victory over previously the undefeated #8 Nebraska Cornhuskers, Wilson recorded a receiving touchdown in the 59–7 victory over the Indiana Hoosiers. Wilson helped lead the Badgers to a 6–0 start and a #4 ranking in the AP Poll. The Badgers dropped their next two games, road losses to the Michigan State Spartans and the Ohio State Buckeyes. Wilson and the Badgers reeled off four consecutive wins to end the regular season. Wilson was efficient during the winning streak, passing for nine touchdowns to no interceptions while rushing for two touchdowns. At the end of the regular season, Wilson was named first team All-Big Ten by both the coaches and media. He also won the Griese-Brees Big Ten Quarterback of the Year award.

In the inaugural Big Ten Championship Game on December 3, Wilson threw for three touchdowns and led the Badgers to a 42–39 win over the Michigan State Spartans. Wilson was named the game's Grange-Griffin MVP. In December 2011, Wilson was named a third team All-American by Yahoo! Sports, and finished ninth in Heisman Trophy voting with 52 points.

In the 2012 Rose Bowl against the Oregon Ducks on January 2, 2012, Wilson had 19 pass completions on 25 attempts for 296 yards, 18 rushing yards, and three touchdowns (two passing, one rushing) as the Badgers lost by a score of 45–38. Wilson finished the season with 33 passing touchdowns, which set the single season record at Wisconsin and was the second-most in Big Ten history behind Drew Brees during the 1998 season at Purdue (39). Wilson also set the single season FBS record for passing efficiency (191.8). On January 28, 2012, Wilson completed his college football career at the 2012 Senior Bowl.

After transferring to the University of Wisconsin, Wilson earned a master's degree in educational leadership and policy analysis.

== Professional career ==
On January 16, 2012, Wilson began training for the NFL Scouting Combine at IMG Academy in Bradenton, Florida. Prior to the 2012 NFL draft, Wilson had been projected by NFL scouts and analysts to be a middle-round pick. In February 2012, former NFL quarterback and director of the IMG Madden Football Academy Chris Weinke said of Wilson, "If he was 6–5, he'd probably be the No. 1 pick in the draft." On April 11, 2012, ESPN Monday Night Football analyst Jon Gruden said, "The only issue with Russell Wilson is his height. That might be the reason he's not picked in the first couple rounds."

Pre-draft measurables
Height	Weight	Arm length	Hand span	Wingspan	40-yard dash	10-yard split	20-yard split	20-yard shuttle	Three-cone drill	Vertical jump	Broad jump	Wonderlic
5 ft 10 5/8 in (1.79 m)	204 lb (93 kg)	31 in (0.79 m)	10 1/4 in (0.26 m)	6 ft 3 1/4 in (1.91 m)	4.55 s	1.59 s	2.66 s	4.09 s	6.97 s	34.0 in (0.86 m)	9 ft 10 in (3.00 m)	28
All values from NFL Combine

=== Seattle Seahawks ===
==== 2012 ====
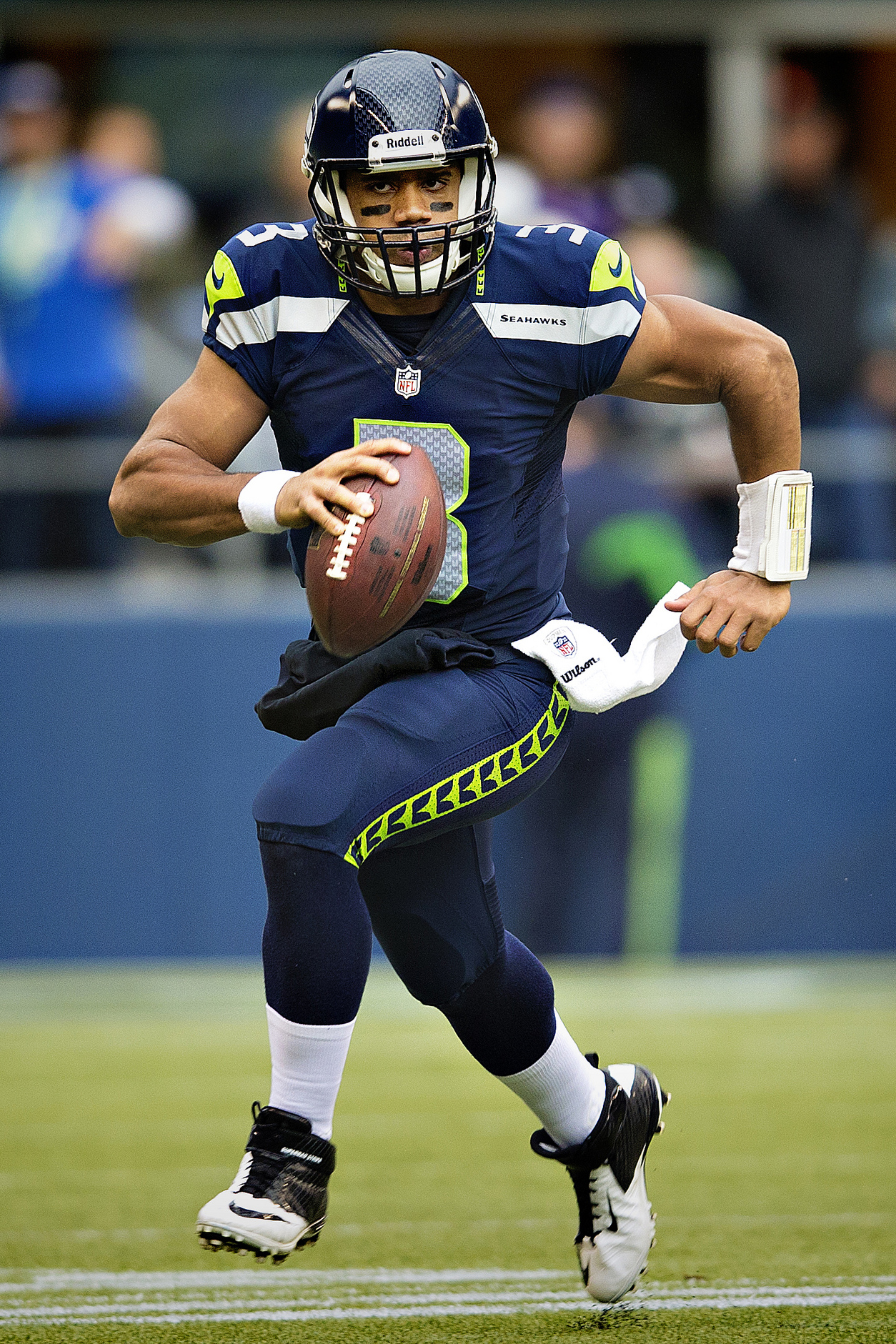
Wilson with the Seattle Seahawks as a rookie, 2012

Wilson was selected by the Seattle Seahawks in the third round (75th overall) of the 2012 NFL draft, the sixth quarterback selected. The Seahawks received significant criticism for their selections in the draft, and Wilson in particular, as they had just signed free agent Matt Flynn. Two weeks later, Wilson signed a four-year, $2.99 million contract with the Seahawks on May 7, 2012.

Wilson made his preseason debut against the Tennessee Titans on August 11, 2012, and had his first preseason start on August 24 against the Kansas City Chiefs. Two days later on August 26, 2012, Wilson was named the starting quarterback for the first regular season game after competing with Flynn and Tarvaris Jackson for the position.

On September 9, 2012, Wilson made his regular season debut in a 20–16 road loss to the Arizona Cardinals. He had 18 completions on 34 passing attempts for 153 yards, one touchdown, and one interception. In the third regular season game on Monday night, the Seahawks won 14–12 over the Green Bay Packers on a controversial Hail Mary touchdown pass to Golden Tate. The contentious nature of the replacement officials' decision on the play was widely considered to have been the tipping point that led to an agreement being reached to end the referee lockout.

Wilson earned Rookie of the Week honors for his performance in a 28–7 victory over the New York Jets on November 11; he completed 12 of 19 passes for 188 yards and two touchdowns, and rushed for 34 yards on seven attempts. He was named NFC Offensive Player of the Week and FedEx Player of the Week for his performance in a 23–17 road win over the Chicago Bears in overtime on December 2. In a 50–17 victory over the Buffalo Bills in Toronto on December 16, Wilson had 205 passing yards, one passing touchdown, nine rushes, 92 rushing yards, and a career-high three rushing touchdowns. He was the first player in NFL history to rush for three touchdowns and throw a touchdown in the first half of a game in the game against Buffalo. He earned NFL Offensive Rookie of the Month honors for December 2012 after the Seahawks went 5–0 and he had a passer rating of 115.2.

Wilson finished the 2012 regular season ranked fourth in the NFL in passer rating (100.0), beating the previous rookie record set by Ben Roethlisberger in 2004 (98.1), since broken by Robert Griffin III in 2012 (102.4) and Dak Prescott in 2016 (104.9). He threw for 3,118 yards and 26 touchdowns, tying Peyton Manning's record for most touchdowns thrown by a rookie, and rushed for 489 yards and four touchdowns. Wilson's scrambling mobility and ability to extend plays outside the pocket with his legs earned numerous comparisons to Hall of Fame quarterback Fran Tarkenton.

Wilson led the Seahawks to the postseason in his rookie year, with both games on the road in January. He made his postseason debut in the NFC Wild Card Round against the Washington Redskins, passing for 187 yards and rushing for 67 yards as the Seahawks rallied for a 24–14 comeback victory. In the Divisional Round against the Atlanta Falcons, Wilson threw for 385 yards and rushed for 60 yards, and his team had a 28–27 lead with 31 seconds to go, but the Falcons managed to kick the winning field goal.

Wilson was selected as an alternate for the 2013 Pro Bowl, filling in for Matt Ryan of Atlanta. At the Pro Bowl in Hawaii on January 27, Wilson completed eight of ten passes for 98 yards, three touchdowns, and no interceptions for a 147.1 rating.

At the end of the season, Wilson earned a bonus of $222,000 through the NFL's Performance-Based Pay program. He was ranked 51st by his fellow players on the NFL Top 100 Players of 2013.

==== 2013: Super Bowl championship ====
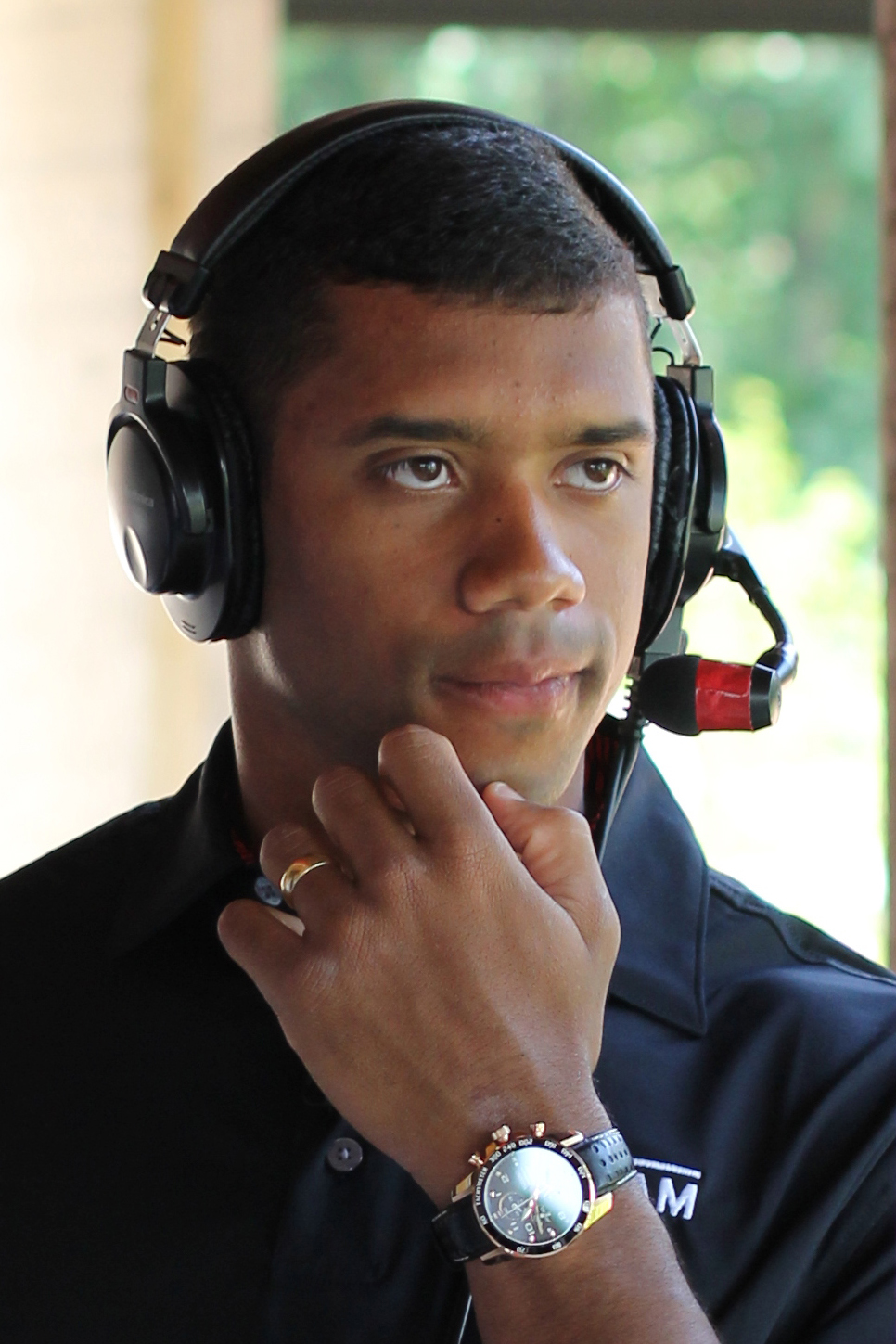
Wilson at the 2013 Jessie Vetter Classic on July 1, 2013

The Seahawks began the 2013 season with the first 4–0 start in franchise history, before losing to the Indianapolis Colts in Week 5. The Seahawks then went on a 7-game winning streak, including a 41–20 victory over the Minnesota Vikings where he posted a career-high 151.4 passer rating and culminating in a 34–7 victory over the New Orleans Saints in Week 13 in which Wilson threw three touchdown passes and earned his second NFC Offensive Player of the Week award. Over the next three weeks, the Seahawks suffered divisional losses to the San Francisco 49ers and Arizona Cardinals (the loss to the Cardinals was Wilson's first home loss), but defeated the St. Louis Rams in Week 17 to finish the season with a 13–3 record, the NFC West title, and the No. 1 seed in the playoffs. Wilson finished the season with 26 touchdown passes, nine interceptions, and a 101.2 passer rating, becoming the first quarterback in the Super Bowl era to post a 100+ passer rating in each of his first two seasons. Wilson was named to his second Pro Bowl on December 27, 2013.

In the Divisional Round, the Seahawks defeated the New Orleans Saints by a score of 23–15. On January 19, 2014, Wilson and the Seahawks defeated the San Francisco 49ers in the NFC Championship by a score of 23–17, advancing to Super Bowl XLVIII. Wilson threw for 206 yards, two touchdowns, and no interceptions for a 123.1 passer rating in a 43–8 win over the Denver Broncos to give the Seahawks their first Super Bowl victory in franchise history. With the victory, Wilson became just the second black starting quarterback to win a Super Bowl, joining Super Bowl XXII winner Doug Williams. At 5'11", he also became the shortest quarterback to win a Super Bowl, shorter than Len Dawson, Joe Theismann, and Drew Brees (all 6'0").

Wilson earned a bonus of $169,141.73 for the 2013 season through the NFL's Performance-Based Pay program. He was ranked 20th by his fellow players on the NFL Top 100 Players of 2014.

==== 2014: Back-to-back Super Bowl appearances ====
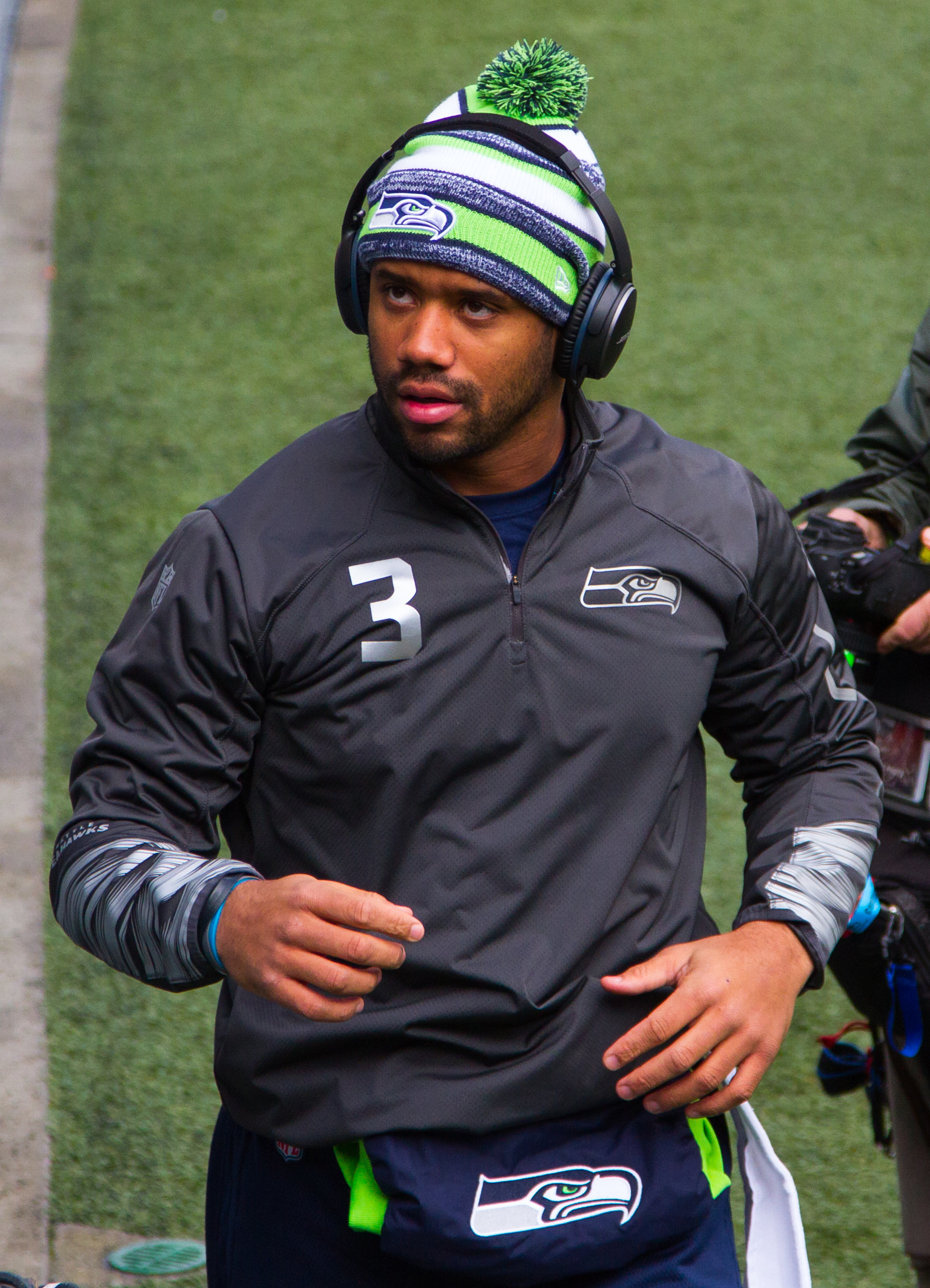
Wilson before a game against the St. Louis Rams in 2014

On September 21, 2014, Wilson led the Seahawks on an 80-yard touchdown drive in overtime to defeat the Denver Broncos, 26–20, in a Week 3 rematch of the previous season's Super Bowl. On October 6, 2014, against the Washington Redskins, Wilson set a new Monday Night Football record for rushing yards by a quarterback in a single game with 122. His 122 rushing yards marks a single-game franchise record for a Seahawks quarterback. In Week 6, Wilson became the first player in NFL history to pass for at least 300 yards and rush for 100 in the same game in the 28–26 loss to the St. Louis Rams. The Seahawks clinched a playoff spot in Week 16 when the Dallas Cowboys defeated the Indianapolis Colts by a score of 42–7, eliminating the Philadelphia Eagles from postseason contention and allowing the Seahawks to clinch their spot before their Sunday Night Football matchup. On December 21, 2014, Wilson went 20-of-31 and threw for a then-career-high 339 yards with two touchdown passes and a rushing touchdown against the Arizona Cardinals in a primetime matchup on Sunday Night Football. Wilson also led the offense in gaining 596 yards, setting a franchise record for most yards gained in a game. The Cardinals had the third-best scoring defense heading into Week 16. The Seahawks won 35–6 as they snapped the Cardinals' seven-game home winning streak and regained first place in the NFC West as well as the NFC's #1 seed. The Seahawks defeated the St. Louis Rams 20–6 in Week 17 to clinch the NFC West and the #1 seed for the second consecutive season, securing homefield advantage for the entirety of the NFC playoffs.

Wilson led the Seahawks to a 31–17 home win over the Carolina Panthers in the Divisional Round, making the Seahawks the first defending Super Bowl Champion to win a playoff game since the 2005 Patriots. The Seahawks hosted the Green Bay Packers in their second consecutive NFC Championship. Wilson threw three first-half interceptions while completing only two passes to his own team as the Seahawks fell behind 16–0 at halftime. With the Packers leading 19–7 and five minutes remaining in the fourth quarter, Wilson threw his fourth interception. Then Wilson led the Seahawks on an improbable comeback. On the Seahawks' next drive, Wilson ran the ball in for a touchdown to cut the deficit to 19–14. After a successful onside kick recovery, Wilson led the Seahawks down the field, and Marshawn Lynch scored to give the Seahawks a 20–19 lead. Wilson completed a 15-yard, two-point conversion pass to Luke Willson to make it 22–19. The Packers tied it up with a field goal at the end of regulation and forced overtime. The Seahawks won the coin toss, and the offense took the field. Wilson led the Seahawks on an 80-yard drive that was capped by a 35-yard game-winning touchdown pass to Jermaine Kearse. The Seahawks completed their largest postseason comeback in franchise history and clinched a Super Bowl berth.

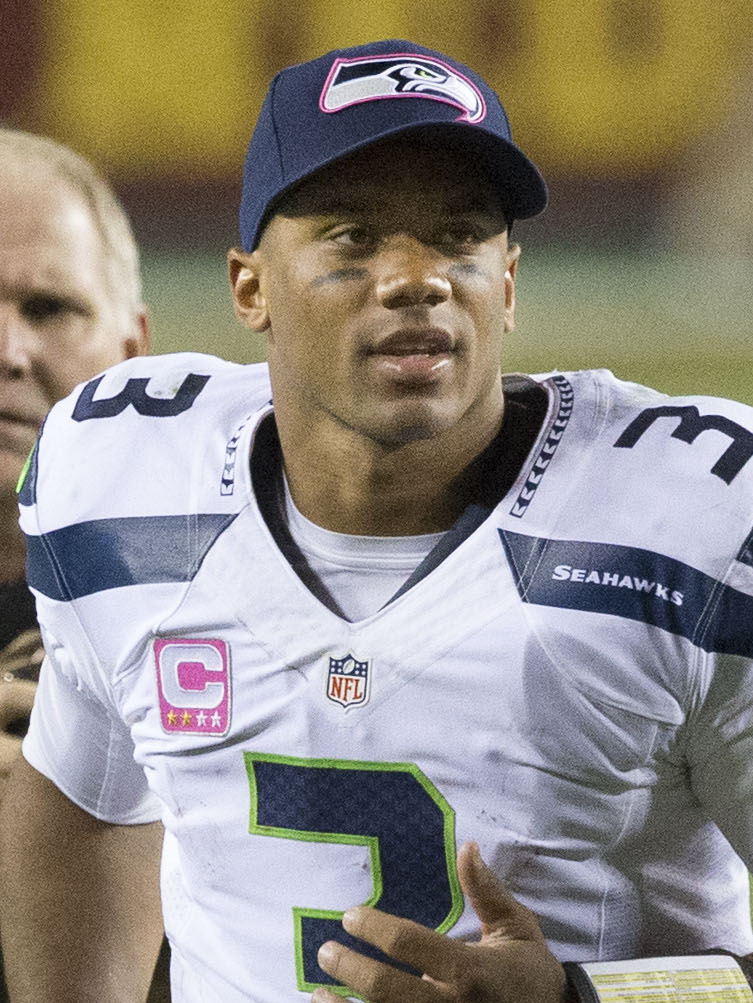
Wilson after a postseason game in 2014

Wilson would have been selected as an alternate to the Pro Bowl, but did not play because the Seahawks advanced to the Super Bowl; as Wilson did not have a chance to decline the invitation, the NFL recognizes this as a Pro Bowl berth for him.

Wilson became the first quarterback in NFL history to start two Super Bowls in his first three professional seasons. The Seahawks became the first defending champion to return to the Super Bowl since the 2004 Patriots. They faced the New England Patriots in Super Bowl XLIX, where they were defeated by a final score of 28–24. Although the Seahawks led 24–14 heading into the fourth quarter, the Patriots scored two consecutive touchdowns to take a four-point lead with 2:02 remaining. Wilson led the Seahawks to the Patriots' one-yard line with 25 seconds remaining, but Patriots cornerback Malcolm Butler intercepted a pass intended for Ricardo Lockette, sealing the victory for the Patriots. He was ranked 22nd by his fellow players on the NFL Top 100 Players of 2015.

==== 2015 ====
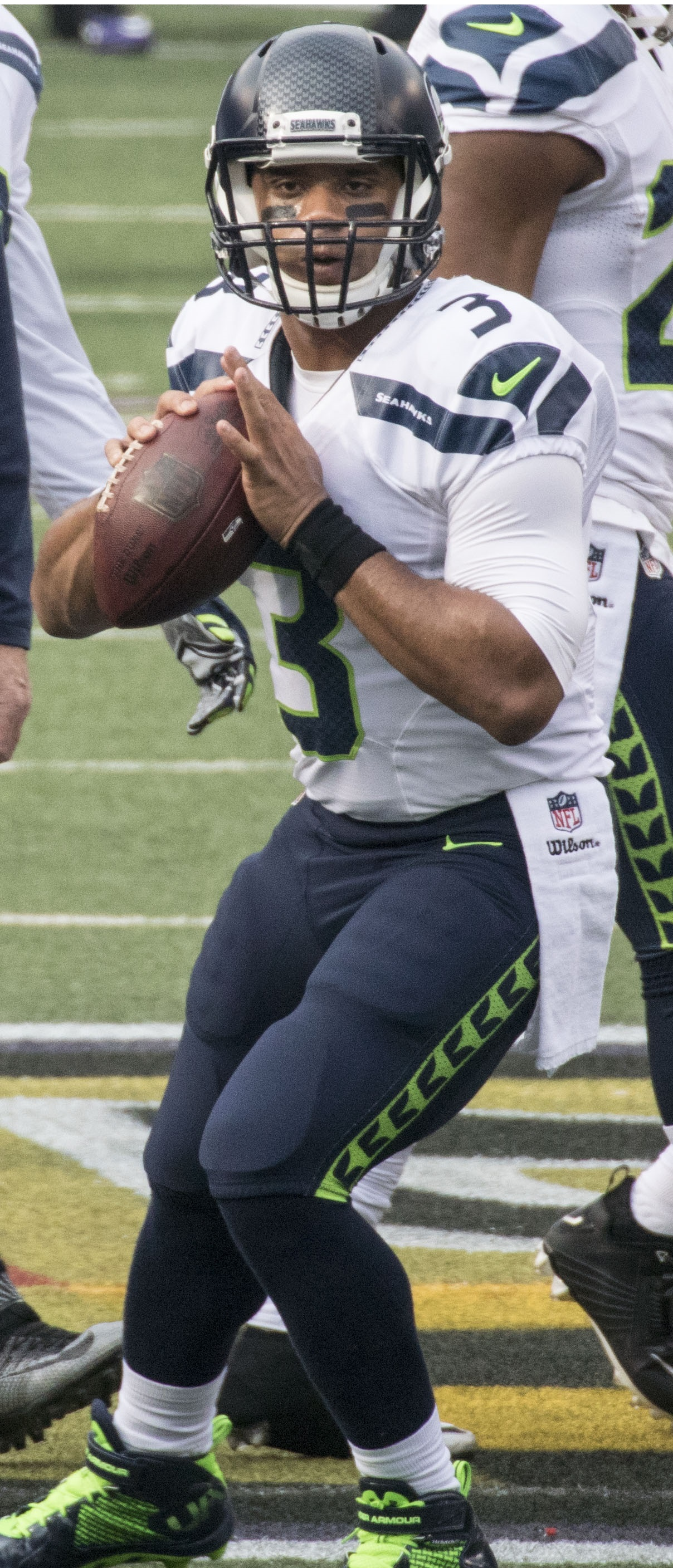
Wilson before a game against the Baltimore Ravens in 2015

On July 31, 2015, the Seahawks and Wilson agreed to a four-year, $87.6 million contract extension, making him, at the time, the second-highest-paid player in the NFL. In the first nine games of the season, Wilson threw 10 touchdown passes and seven interceptions. Over the next five games, Wilson threw 19 touchdowns and no interceptions, becoming the only quarterback in NFL history to throw 3+ touchdown passes and no interceptions in five consecutive games. After a 2–4 start to the season, Wilson led the Seahawks to win seven of their next eight games and clinch a fourth consecutive playoff appearance in their Week 15 win over the Cleveland Browns. His strong performance over the second half of the season, even after losing star running back Marshawn Lynch and tight end Jimmy Graham, led many analysts to consider Wilson an MVP candidate.

Wilson broke numerous Seahawks single season passing records in 2015, including most passing yards (4,024), most passing touchdowns (34), and highest passer rating (110.1). He became the first Seahawks quarterback to throw for over 4,000 yards in a season, and finished the year with the highest passer rating in the NFL. Wilson's 51.7% deep ball completion percentage was the highest among NFL quarterbacks. On December 22, 2015, Wilson was named to his third Pro Bowl. He was ranked 17th on the NFL Top 100 Players of 2016.

The Seahawks traveled to Minnesota to face the Minnesota Vikings in the Wild Card Round. The temperature at kickoff was −6 °F (−25 °F wind chill), making it the third coldest game in NFL history. Wilson struggled in the sub-zero temperatures, throwing for 142 yards, one touchdown, and one interception. The Vikings missed a short field goal in the last minute, allowing the Seahawks to advance to the Divisional Round to face the 15–1 Carolina Panthers. Down 31–0 at the half, Wilson helped lead a furious comeback attempt, but the Panthers won 31–24, denying Wilson and the Seahawks their third consecutive in the NFC Championship and a shot at a third consecutive Super Bowl appearance. In that game, Wilson threw for 366 yards, three touchdowns, and two interceptions.

Wilson was drafted first overall by Team Irvin in the 2016 Pro Bowl draft, and in the game threw eight completions on 12 attempts for 164 yards, three touchdowns, and no interceptions for a 149.3 rating. He was named the Pro Bowl offensive MVP.

==== 2016 ====
The Seahawks had a solid 2016 season with Wilson at the helm. However, Wilson drew two minor injuries: his ankle during Week 1 against the Miami Dolphins after getting stepped on by defensive lineman Ndamukong Suh, and his left knee against the 49ers during Week 3 after a takedown by linebacker Eli Harold. The injuries hampered Wilson's trademark mobility, and many speculated that he would be rested in order to properly recover.

Regardless, Wilson started all 16 games in the season. On November 20, against the Philadelphia Eagles, he had a 15-yard touchdown reception on a pass from Doug Baldwin on a trick play. Wilson also played the worst game of his career in 2016, throwing five interceptions in a 38–10 loss to the Green Bay Packers during Week 14. The team finished with a 10–5–1 record and won the NFC West. Wilson put together a season where he recorded a career-high 4,219 passing yards, 21 passing touchdowns, 259 rushing yards, and one rushing touchdown. The Seahawks made the playoffs, where they defeated the Detroit Lions in the Wild Card Round. The win gave Wilson his eighth playoff victory. However, they fell 20–36 to the eventual NFC champion Atlanta Falcons in the Divisional Round at the Georgia Dome. He was ranked 24th by his peers on the NFL Top 100 Players of 2017.

==== 2017 ====
On September 5, 2017, Wilson was voted Seahawks offensive captain for the fifth consecutive season. In Week 3, in a 33–27 loss to the Tennessee Titans, he was 29 of 49 for 373 passing yards and four passing touchdowns. In Week 8 against the Houston Texans, Wilson posted an astounding performance, going 26 of 41 for a career-high 452 passing yards and four touchdowns in a matchup where both he and Deshaun Watson each threw over 400 yards. Wilson also rushed for 30 yards, totaling 482 yards of offense in the 41–38 victory. With his strong performance, Wilson earned NFC Offensive Player of the Week. On December 21, 2017, the Seahawks were fined $100,000 for failure to properly apply the concussion protocol on a hit Wilson sustained during the Week 10 win over the Arizona Cardinals.

In a Week 12 win over the San Francisco 49ers, Wilson became the winningest quarterback in a player's first six seasons with 63 wins, surpassing Joe Flacco. Next week, with his 15-yard touchdown throw to running back J. D. McKissic, the third of his game, Wilson tied Eli Manning in 2011 for the most fourth quarter touchdowns in a single season with 15. He went 20 for 31 for 227 yards and three touchdowns in that game, earning him NFC Offensive Player of the Week. On December 19, 2017, Wilson was named to his fourth Pro Bowl.

The Seahawks ended the season with a 9–7 record, ending Wilson's streak of five consecutive seasons with double-digit wins and a playoff appearance. He threw for 34 touchdown passes, finishing the season as the league's leader in touchdowns thrown. With 586 rushing yards and three touchdowns, he also finished the season as the team's leading rusher in both categories. Wilson was ranked 11th by his peers on the NFL Top 100 Players of 2018.

==== 2018 ====
With the Seahawks having lost many Pro Bowl starters in the offseason such as Cliff Avril, Michael Bennett, Kam Chancellor, Jimmy Graham, and Richard Sherman, and having star safety Earl Thomas injured in the beginning of the regular season, many considered the team as fringe playoff contenders given the competitiveness of teams in the NFC. In addition to dealing with a re-tooled roster, Wilson also had a new offensive coordinator in Brian Schottenheimer, who replaced Darrell Bevell.

Wilson was once again named as a captain for the Seahawks going into the 2018 season. He started the season with 298 passing yards, three touchdowns, and two interceptions in a 27–24 loss to the Denver Broncos in Week 1. In Week 3, against the Dallas Cowboys, he helped lead the Seahawks to their first victory of the season with 192 passing yards and two touchdowns. In Weeks 5–8, against the Los Angeles Rams, Oakland Raiders, and Detroit Lions, he had three consecutive games with three passing touchdowns. In Week 13, against the San Francisco 49ers, he had 185 passing yards and four touchdowns in the 43–16 victory.

In Week 16, the Seahawks faced off against the top-seeded Kansas City Chiefs on NBC Sunday Night Football. Wilson out-dueled the season's eventual MVP Patrick Mahomes to lead the team to a 38–31 victory. This not only ensured another winning season for the Seahawks, but also defied early-season expectations by returning to the post-season after a one-year absence. Wilson finished the season with 35 touchdowns and a 110.9 passer rating, both personal and franchise bests. He also set career franchise records with most quarterback regular-season wins (75) and most touchdowns (196). As the No. 5-seed in the NFC, the Seahawks faced off against the Cowboys in the Wild Card Round. Wilson passed for 233 yards and one passing touchdown to go along with a rushing touchdown as the Seahawks fell 24–22.

Wilson was named to the Pro Bowl for the sixth time in his career, replacing Aaron Rodgers. He was ranked 25th by his fellow players on the NFL Top 100 Players of 2019.

==== 2019 ====
On April 16, 2019, Wilson signed a four-year, $140 million contract extension to remain with the Seahawks through the 2023 season, making him the highest paid player in the NFL. In Week 2 against the Pittsburgh Steelers, Wilson threw for 300 yards and three touchdowns as the Seahawks won 28–26, earning him NFC Offensive Player of the Week. In Week 3 against the New Orleans Saints, Wilson completed 32 passes for 406 yards and two passing touchdowns. In addition, he rushed seven times for 51 yards and two rushing touchdowns in the 33–27 loss. In Week 5 against the Los Angeles Rams, Wilson threw for 268 yards and four touchdowns in the 30–29 win. The next week, in a 32–28 victory over the Cleveland Browns, he had 295 passing yards and two passing touchdowns. In Week 9 against the Tampa Bay Buccaneers, Wilson threw for 378 yards and five touchdowns in the 40–34 overtime win, taking over the league lead in touchdowns and quarterback rating. He was named NFC Offensive Player of the Week for his performance. In Week 10 against the then-undefeated San Francisco 49ers, Wilson threw for 232 yards, one touchdown, and one interception, and led the Seahawks to a 27–24 overtime win.

Wilson finished the 2019 season with 4,110 passing yards, 31 passing touchdowns, and five interceptions to go along with 75 carries for 342 rushing yards and three rushing touchdowns as the Seahawks finished with an 11–5 record and made the playoffs as the NFC's #5 seed. He was once again named to the Pro Bowl, but also made his first appearance on the AP All-Pro team, being named second-team quarterback after Lamar Jackson.

In the Wild Card Round against the Philadelphia Eagles, Wilson completed 18 of 30 passes for 325 yards and a touchdown. In addition, he rushed nine times for 45 yards. He accounted for 95 percent of the Seahawks total offense and led them to a 17–9 victory over the Eagles. In the Divisional Round against the Green Bay Packers, Wilson threw for 277 yards and a touchdown and rushed for 64 yards during the 28–23 loss.

Wilson was ranked 2nd on the NFL Top 100 Players of 2020, the highest of his career.

==== 2020 ====
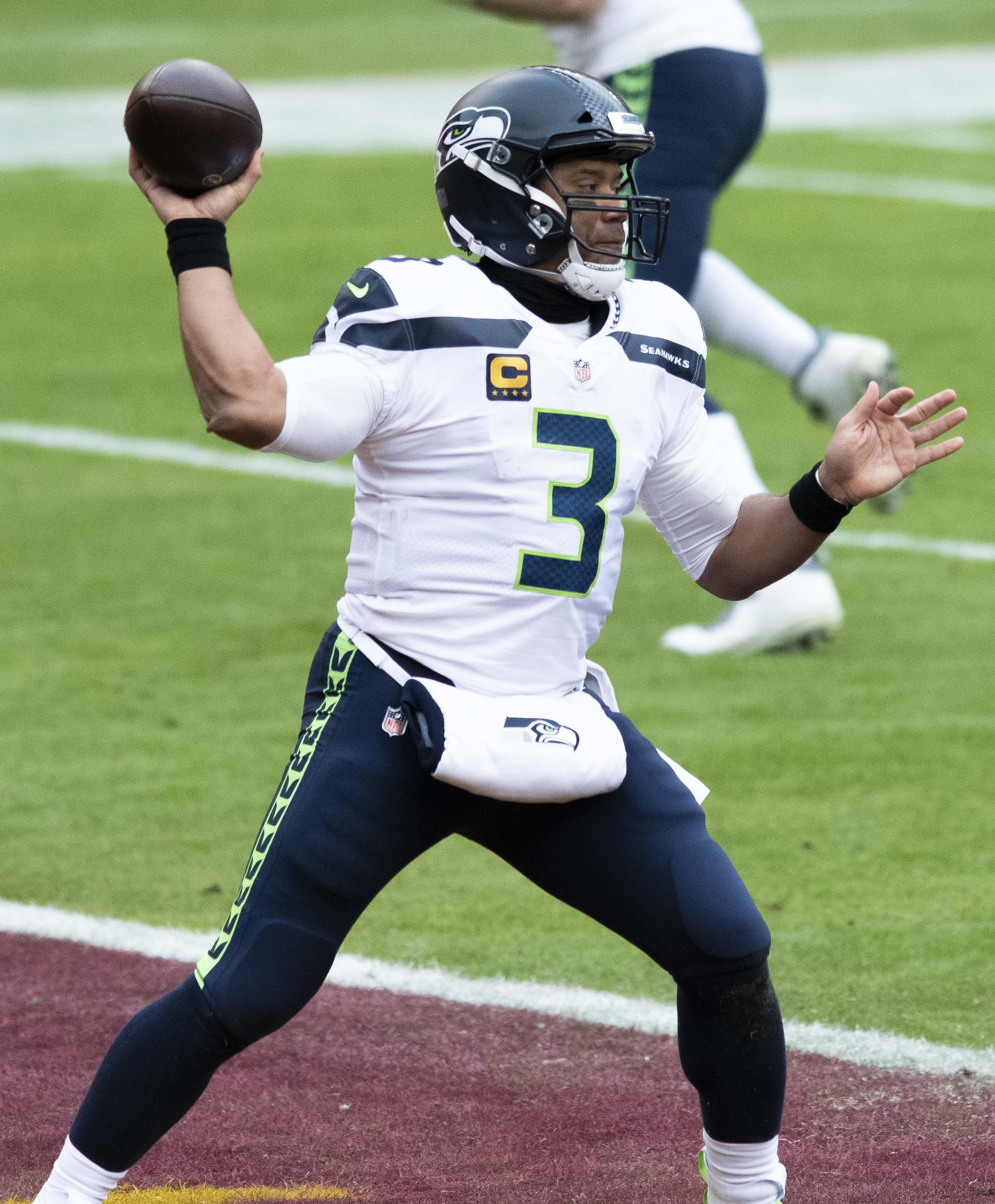
Wilson during a game against the Washington Football Team in 2020

Wilson started off the 2020 season going 31 of 35 for 322 passing yards and four passing touchdowns in the 38–25 victory over the Atlanta Falcons. He was named the NFC Offensive Player of the Week for his performance in Week 1. In Week 2, against the New England Patriots, he had 288 passing yards, five passing touchdowns, and one interception in the 35–30 victory. Wilson continued his great start to the season with 315 passing yards and five touchdowns in the 38–31 victory over the Dallas Cowboys. Wilson set an NFL record most passing touchdowns through three games with 14. He was again named the NFC Offensive Player of the Week for his performance in Week 3. Wilson's 14 touchdown passes in the first three games of the season set a new NFL record. He was the first player in NFL history to pass for at least four touchdowns in the first three games of a season. On October 1, 2020, Wilson was named the NFC Offensive Player of the Month for his performance in September. In Week 4, Wilson passed for 360 yards, two touchdowns, and one interception in the 31–23 victory over the Miami Dolphins.

In Week 5 against the Minnesota Vikings, Wilson threw for 217 yards and three touchdowns, including the game-winning six-yard touchdown pass to DK Metcalf with 14 seconds left in the game, during the 27–26 win. This win was his 100th win in 148 total games as starting quarterback for the Seahawks. In Week 7 against the Arizona Cardinals, Wilson completed 33 of 50 passes for 388 yards and three touchdowns, plus rushed 6 times for 48 yards, but threw three interceptions including a costly one to Isaiah Simmons with one minute left in overtime as the Seahawks lost 37–34. In Week 8 against the San Francisco 49ers, he threw for 261 yards and four passing touchdowns in the 37–27 victory. In Week 9, against the Buffalo Bills, he had 390 passing yards, two passing touchdowns, and two interceptions to go along with a rushing touchdown in the 44–34 loss.

In Week 14 against the New York Jets, Wilson threw for 206 yards, four touchdowns, and one interception during the 40–3 win. In the Week 17 season finale against the San Francisco 49ers, Wilson went 20 of 36 for 181 yards and two touchdowns and also rushed for 29 yards in the 26–23 victory. Overall, Wilson finished the 2020 season with 4,212 passing yards, 40 touchdowns, and 13 interceptions. Wilson broke his own franchise record for passing touchdowns in a single season with his efforts in 2020. In the Wild Card Round, Wilson was unable to continue his success from the regular season, only completing 11 of 27 passes for 174 yards, two touchdowns, and one interception that was returned for a touchdown by Darious Williams in a 30–20 loss to the Los Angeles Rams. A few days later on February 6, Wilson was named the Walter Payton NFL Man of the Year for his consistent and outstanding community service throughout the entirety of his career.

Wilson was ranked 12th on the NFL Top 100 Players of 2021, the third highest ranking of his career.

==== 2021 ====
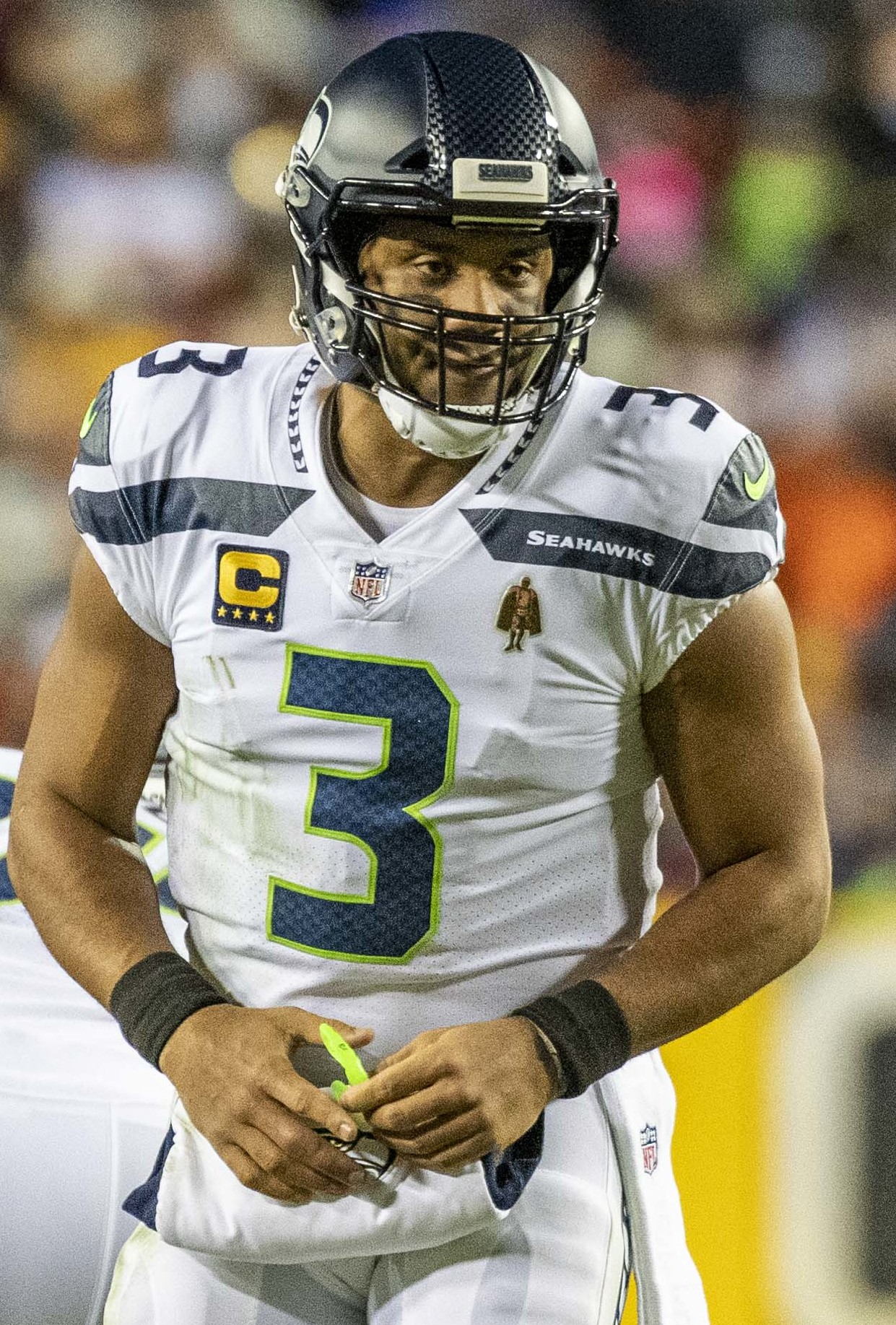
Wilson during a game against the Washington Football Team in 2021

During the Week 5 loss to the Los Angeles Rams, Wilson left the game after suffering a broken middle finger on his passing hand in the third quarter. He had surgery to repair the injury on October 8, 2021. On October 15, 2021, he was ruled out for the Week 6 game against the Pittsburgh Steelers. It was the first game he missed in his career, which ended a streak of 149 consecutive games started by an NFL quarterback, which is sixth all-time. His mark was the longest streak by a Seahawks' quarterback in franchise history. He was placed on injured reserve later that same day, ensuring he would miss the next three games at minimum. He was activated off injured reserve November 12. Wilson finished the season with 3,113 passing yards, 25 touchdowns, six interceptions, and an additional two rushing touchdowns as the Seahawks finished with a 7–10 record, their first losing record since Wilson's arrival. Wilson earned his ninth Pro Bowl nomination after Tom Brady was unable to participate. He was ranked 61st by his fellow players on the NFL Top 100 Players of 2022.

=== Denver Broncos ===
On March 16, 2022, the Seahawks traded Wilson and a fourth-round pick to the Broncos in exchange for two first-round picks, two second-round picks, a fifth-round pick, quarterback Drew Lock, defensive lineman Shelby Harris, and tight end Noah Fant.

Teammates said the trade was unavoidable, as Wilson broke with the team and "checked out" mid-season. Seahawks chairperson Jody Allen released a statement indicating that the trade was initiated by Wilson. The Seahawks said that Wilson did not approve of the team firing offensive line coach Mike Solari and offensive coordinator Brian Schottenheimer. Wilson said that while he did not initiate the trade, the decision was mutual.

Before he left the Seahawks, Wilson reportedly asked for the firing of coach Pete Carroll and general manager John Schneider. Wilson denied these reports in a tweet.

On September 1, 2022, Wilson signed a five-year, $245 million contract extension with the Broncos.

==== 2022 ====
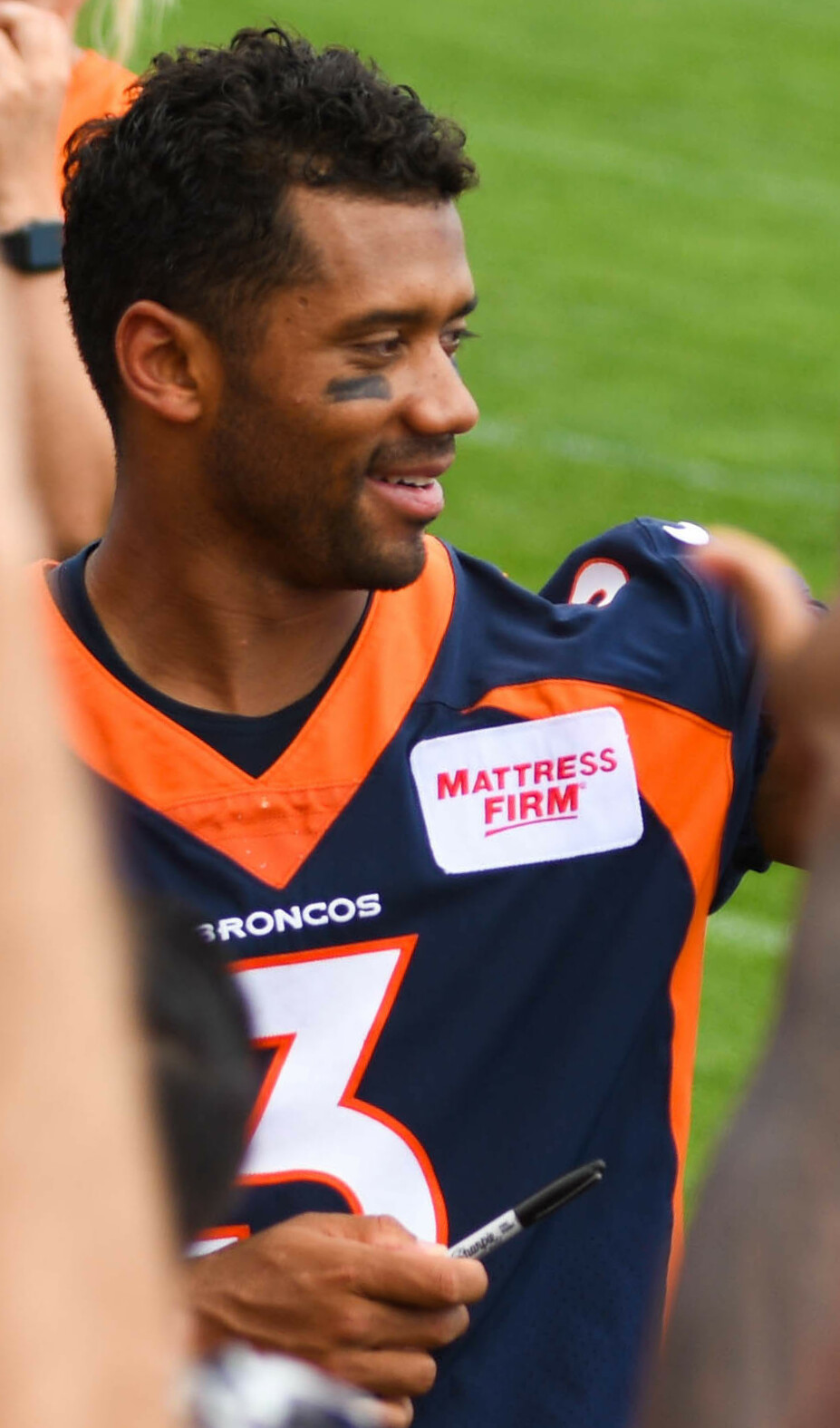
Wilson with the Denver Broncos in 2022

In the season opener of the 2022 season, against the Seattle Seahawks, Wilson completed 29 of 42 passes for 340 yards and one touchdown in a 17–16 loss to his former team.

In Week 2 against the Houston Texans, Wilson went 14 of 31 for 219 yards, one touchdown, and one interception in a 16–9 win, his first as a Bronco. Despite an 11–10 victory over the San Francisco 49ers in Week 3, Wilson threw no touchdowns and only 126 yards. In Week 4 against the Las Vegas Raiders, Wilson completed 17 of 25 passes for 237 yards and two touchdowns, and also had 29 rushing yards and a rushing touchdown, but lost 32–23. Against the Indianapolis Colts, Wilson went 21 of 39 for 274 yards, no touchdowns, and two interceptions in a 12–9 overtime loss. After the game, Wilson underwent a procedure on his right shoulder.

In Week 6 against the Los Angeles Chargers, Wilson completed 10 passes for 116 yards and a touchdown for a 148.3 passer rating in the first quarter, but lost 19–16 in overtime. During the game, Wilson suffered a partially torn hamstring, causing him to miss Week 7 against the New York Jets. In Week 8 against the Jacksonville Jaguars in London, Wilson went 18 of 30 for 252 yards, one touchdown, and one interception in a 21–17 win.

In Week 10 against the Tennessee Titans, Wilson went 21 of 42 for 286 yards, one touchdown, and one interception in a 17–10 loss. In a Week 11 rematch against the Raiders, Wilson went 24 of 31 for 247 yards, no touchdowns, and no interceptions in a 22–16 overtime loss. Against the Carolina Panthers in week 12, Wilson went 19 of 35 for 142 yards and a touchdown in a 23–10 loss. During the game, he threw his 300th career touchdown pass, making him the fifth active quarterback with 300 career touchdown passes.

In Week 13 against the Baltimore Ravens, Wilson went 17 of 22 for 189 yards, no touchdowns, and no interceptions in a 10–9 loss. In Week 14 against the Kansas City Chiefs, Wilson went 23 of 36 for 247 yards, three touchdowns, and an interception in a 34–28 loss, but left the game after sustaining a concussion during the fourth quarter. Despite passing concussion protocols, Wilson missed the Week 15 game against the Arizona Cardinals.

Wilson returned in Week 16 on Christmas Day against the Los Angeles Rams, where he threw for 214 yards, a touchdown, and three interceptions, and was sacked six times in the 51–14 loss, with his interception to former teammate Bobby Wagner gaining internet fame due to the commentary of voice actor Bill Fagerbakke on the game's Nickelodeon broadcast, in which Fagerbakke acted in-character as Patrick Star. In a Week 17 rematch against the Kansas City Chiefs, Wilson went 26 of 38 for 222 yards, a touchdown, and an interception, along with 27 rushing yards and two rushing touchdowns in a 27–24 loss. In a Week 18 rematch against the Los Angeles Chargers, Wilson went 13 of 24 for 283 yards, three touchdowns, and an interception in a 31–28 win.

Overall, Wilson passed for 3,524 yards, 16 touchdowns, and 11 interceptions along with 55 carries for 277 rushing yards and three rushing touchdowns in the 2022 season. The 2022 season was considered a massive disappointment for Wilson and the Broncos and resulted in the firing of head coach Nathaniel Hackett. Wilson was sacked more than any other quarterback in the 2022 season. The Broncos had the league's worst scoring offense with 287 total points for 16.9 points per game. Despite the disappointing season for Wilson, some of his teammates went on social media to express their support for him. In March 2023, it was revealed that Wilson underwent arthroscopic surgery on his right knee during the offseason.

==== 2023 ====
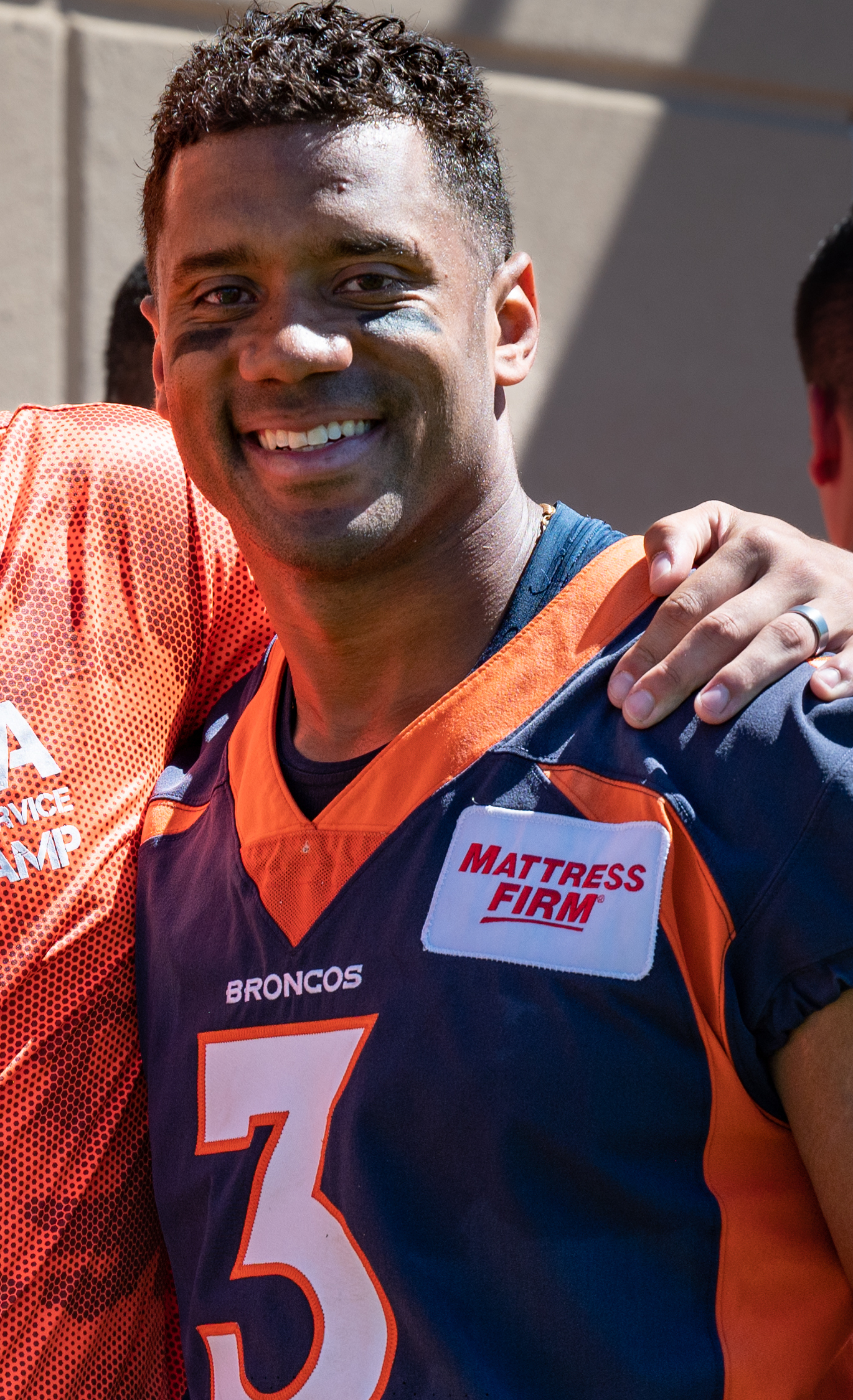
Wilson with the Denver Broncos in 2023

Going into the 2023 season, Wilson had a new head coach in Sean Payton. In the season opener against the Las Vegas Raiders, Wilson completed 27 of 34 passes for 177 yards and 2 touchdowns in a 17–16 loss. In the following week against the Washington Commanders, Wilson threw for 308 yards and three touchdowns, including a 50-yard Hail-Mary pass, but also had two turnovers in a 35–33 defeat. Against the Commanders, Wilson became the first player in NFL history to rush for 5,000 yards and pass for 40,000 in a career. In Week 3, Wilson went for 23 of 38 for 306 yards, one touchdown pass, and an interception in a 70–20 blowout loss to the Miami Dolphins. After that loss, he started 0–3 record for the first time in his career.

In Week 4 against the Chicago Bears, Wilson threw for three touchdowns as the Broncos bounced back from the 21-point margin to defeat the Bears in 31–28 comeback victory. In the following week against the New York Jets, Wilson completed 20 of 31 passes for 196 yards and two touchdowns, but also took 4 sacks in a 31–21 loss.

In Week 6, Wilson went 13-of-22 completions for 95 yards and one touchdown, but also threw two interceptions and took four sacks in a 19–8 defeat to the Kansas City Chiefs. Against the Green Bay Packers in the following week, Wilson rebounded from his worst game as a Bronco a week earlier, completing 20-of-29 passes for 195 yards with one touchdown to secure a 19–17 victory at home for the first time. In Week 7 rematch against the Chiefs, Wilson completed 12 of 19 completions for 114 yards and three touchdowns in a 24–9 upset victory.

Following the bye week, Wilson completed 24 of 29 passes for 193 yards with two touchdowns in a narrow 24–22 victory against the Buffalo Bills. In Week 11 against the Minnesota Vikings, Wilson went 27 of 35 for 259 yards and one touchdown, game-winner to Courtland Sutton to secure a 21–20 victory. Following losses to the Detroit Lions and New England Patriots in Weeks 15 and 16, the Broncos announced that Wilson would be benched for the final two games of the season to "preserve financial flexibility".

On March 4, 2024, the Broncos announced that Wilson would be released on March 13, the start of the new league year.

=== Pittsburgh Steelers ===
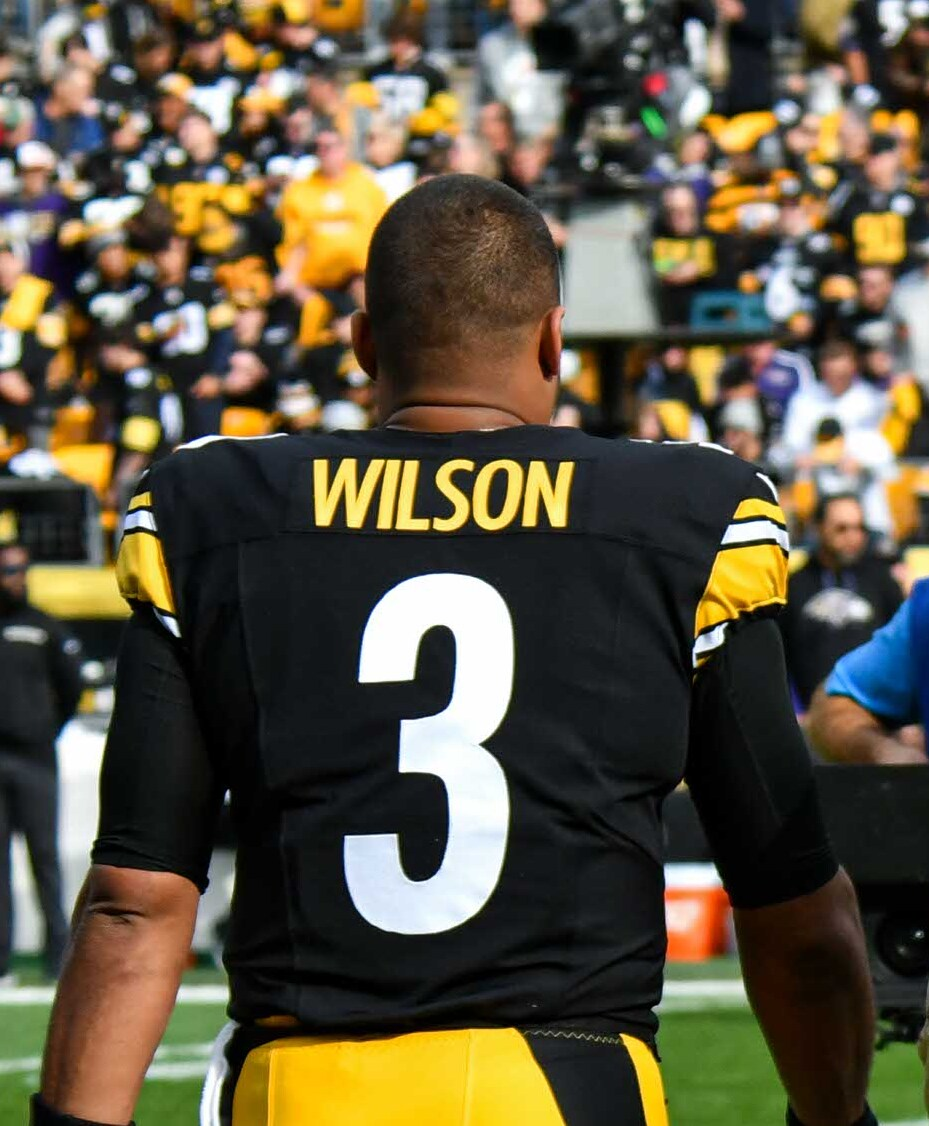
Wilson takes the field before a game at Acrisure Stadium in 2024

On March 15, 2024, Wilson signed a one-year deal with the Pittsburgh Steelers for the veteran's minimum ($1.2 million). On August 28, Wilson was named the starter to begin the season after beating out Justin Fields for the starting quarterback position. However, he was ruled out due to reaggravating a calf injury during practice on September 5. The calf injury kept Wilson out for the first five weeks of the season before being deemed active for the first time in Week 6 as the backup to Fields.

On October 20, Wilson made his first start for the Steelers in Week 7 against the New York Jets, throwing for 264 yards, two touchdowns, and adding a rushing score in a 37–15 victory, marking the Steelers' highest-scoring game of the season. His 264 passing yards were the most by a Steelers quarterback in his debut. In Week 10 against the Washington Commanders, Wilson threw for three touchdowns, including the game-winner with under three minutes left as the Steelers rallied to win 28–27. Wilson won his first four starts before suffering his first loss in Week 12 against the Cleveland Browns by a score of 24–19. Against the Cincinnati Bengals the following week, Wilson produced the third 400-yard passing performance of his career, finishing 414 yards and three touchdowns and rebounding from a pick-six in the first quarter to lead the Steelers to a 44–38 victory.

Wilson helped the Steelers reach a 10–3 record and first place in the AFC North, but a four-game losing streak to close the season, in which the Pittsburgh offense averaged 14 points and Wilson averaged under 200 yards per game, dropped the Steelers out of contention for the division and into a Wild Card spot. Over 11 regular-season games, Wilson accumulated 2,482 yards, 16 touchdowns, five interceptions, and a 95.6 passer rating. He was named to the 2025 Pro Bowl as a replacement, marking his tenth selection. In the Wild Card Round against the Baltimore Ravens, Wilson, in his first playoff appearance in four seasons, completed 20-of-29 passes for 270 yards, two touchdowns, and zero interceptions, but the Steelers could not recover from a 21-point halftime deficit as they lost 28–14.

=== New York Giants ===
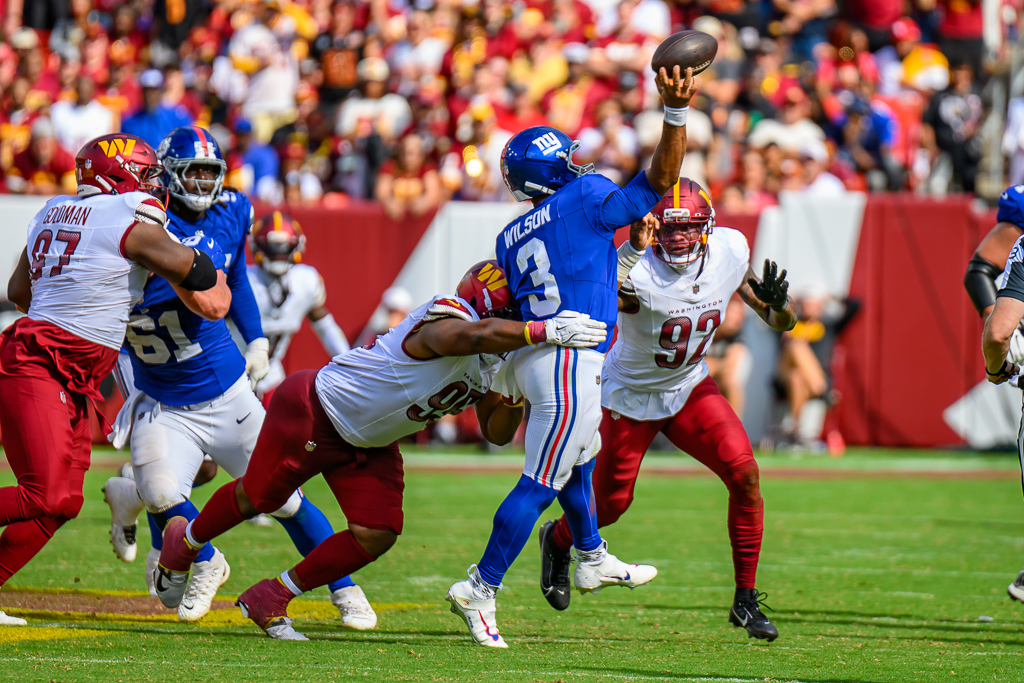
Wilson in his New York Giants debut, playing the Washington Commanders, 2025

On March 26, 2025, Wilson signed a one-year, $10.5 million contract with the New York Giants. Although the Giants signed veteran Jameis Winston and drafted Jaxson Dart in the first round of the 2025 NFL draft, the team announced that Wilson would be their starting quarterback to open the regular season.

Wilson made his Giants debut on September 7, 2025, in Week 1 at the Washington Commanders; he struggled, completing less than half of his pass attempts for 168 yards, no touchdowns and no interceptions in the 21–6 loss. Wilson would rebound the following week at the Dallas Cowboys, completing 30-of-41 passes, for 450 yards (just two yards shy of his career high of 452 yards set in 2017), three touchdowns and one interception, including a late 48-yard go-ahead touchdown pass to Malik Nabers, to momentarily give New York a 37–34 lead with 25 seconds left in regulation before Dallas sent the game to overtime with a subsequent field goal. Despite Wilson's performance, the Giants would eventually fall short in overtime 40–37.

In a 22–9 loss against the Kansas City Chiefs in Week 3, Wilson completed 18 of 32 passes for 160 yards, zero touchdowns, and two interceptions, as fans booed Wilson in his first home game at MetLife Stadium and chanted "We want Dart". Wilson was benched for Dart in Week 4.

During the third quarter of the Week 6 game against the divisional rival Philadelphia Eagles, Wilson went in for two snaps while Dart was being checked out under concussion protocol. Wilson was booed while walking off the field after handing the ball off and throwing a single incompletion. Wilson also replaced Dart for the rest of the Week 10 game against the Chicago Bears due to a concussion he suffered late in the third quarter. The Giants blew a ten-point lead and Wilson was sacked late to set up the Bears' game-winning touchdown drive. After the game, Wilson was demoted to third-string quarterback behind Winston. At the end of the 2025 season, Wilson told the media that he suffered a hamstring tear in September before Week 2, which was not disclosed to the NFL since the Giants never listed him on their injury reports.

=== Retirement ===
Despite receiving an offer to be a backup quarterback for the New York Jets, Wilson announced his retirement from the NFL on June 3, 2026, after 14 seasons. Coinciding with his retirement announcement, he revealed that he was joining CBS Sports as a broadcast analyst.

== Career statistics ==
Legend
	Won the Super Bowl
	Led the league
**Bold**	Career high

=== NFL ===
==== Regular season ====
Year	Team	Games			Passing									Rushing					Sacks		Fumbles	
Year	Team	GP	GS	Record	Cmp	Att	Pct	Yds	Y/A	Lng	TD	Int	Rtg	Att	Yds	Y/A	Lng	TD	Sck	Yds	Fum	Lost
2012	SEA	16	16	11–5	252	393	64.1	3,118	7.9	67	26	10	100.0	94	489	5.2	25	4	33	203	6	3
2013	SEA	16	16	**13–3**	257	407	63.1	3,357	8.2	**80**	26	9	101.2	96	539	5.6	27	1	44	272	10	**5**
2014	SEA	16	16	12–4	285	452	63.1	3,475	7.7	**80**	20	7	95.0	**118**	**849**	**7.2**	**55**	**6**	42	242	11	0
2015	SEA	16	16	10–6	329	483	68.1	4,024	**8.3**	**80**	34	8	110.1	103	553	5.4	24	1	45	265	7	3
2016	SEA	16	16	10–5–1	353	546	64.7	**4,219**	7.7	59	21	11	92.6	72	259	3.6	18	1	41	293	8	2
2017	SEA	16	16	9–7	339	553	61.3	3,983	7.2	74	34	11	95.4	95	586	6.2	31	3	43	322	**14**	3
2018	SEA	16	16	10–6	280	427	65.6	3,448	8.1	66	35	7	**110.9**	67	376	5.6	40	0	51	355	10	2
2019	SEA	16	16	11–5	341	516	66.1	4,110	8.0	60	31	5	106.3	75	342	4.6	21	3	48	319	8	2
2020	SEA	16	16	12–4	**384**	**558**	**68.8**	4,212	7.5	62	**40**	**13**	105.1	83	513	6.2	38	2	47	301	7	4
2021	SEA	14	14	6–8	259	400	64.8	3,113	7.8	69	25	6	103.1	43	183	4.3	17	2	33	266	6	1
2022	DEN	15	15	4–11	292	483	60.5	3,524	7.3	67	16	11	84.4	55	277	5.0	19	3	**55**	**368**	6	2
2023	DEN	15	15	7–8	297	447	66.4	3,070	6.9	60	26	8	98.0	80	341	4.3	21	3	45	258	10	**5**
2024	PIT	11	11	6–5	214	336	63.7	2,482	7.4	46	16	5	95.6	43	155	3.6	19	2	33	219	5	4
2025	NYG	6	3	0–3	69	119	58.0	831	7.0	52	3	3	77.4	18	106	5.9	15	0	10	66	3	0
Career		205	202	121–80–1	3,951	6,120	64.6	46,966	7.7	80	353	114	99.3	1,042	5,568	5.3	55	31	570	3,749	111	36

==== Postseason ====
Year	Team	Games			Passing									Rushing					Sacks		Fumbles	
Year	Team	GP	GS	Record	Cmp	Att	Pct	Yds	Y/A	Lng	TD	Int	Rtg	Att	Yds	Y/A	Lng	TD	Sck	Yds	Fum	Lost
2012	SEA	2	2	1–1	39	62	62.9	572	9.2	34	3	1	102.4	15	**127**	8.5	**28**	**1**	7	48	1	0
2013	SEA	3	3	**3–0**	43	68	63.2	524	7.7	51	3	0	101.6	11	42	3.8	16	0	7	22	**2**	**1**
2014	SEA	3	3	2–1	41	72	56.9	**724**	**10.1**	**63**	**6**	**5**	90.3	**17**	86	5.1	17	**1**	**10**	**58**	**2**	0
2015	SEA	2	2	1–1	**44**	**74**	59.5	508	6.9	35	4	3	81.4	8	53	6.6	14	0	7	54	1	0
2016	SEA	2	2	1–1	40	60	66.7	449	7.5	42	4	2	97.2	9	46	5.1	14	0	6	31	0	0
2018	SEA	1	1	0–1	18	27	66.7	233	8.6	53	1	0	105.9	3	14	4.7	7	**1**	1	7	0	0
2019	SEA	2	2	1–1	39	61	63.9	602	9.9	53	2	0	107.4	16	109	6.8	22	0	6	19	1	0
2020	SEA	1	1	0–1	11	27	40.7	174	6.4	51	2	1	72.1	4	50	**12.5**	23	0	5	32	0	0
2024	PIT	1	1	0–1	20	29	**69.0**	270	9.3	37	2	0	**121.3**	3	6	2.0	5	0	4	19	0	0
Career		17	17	9–8	295	480	61.5	4,056	8.5	63	27	12	96.8	86	533	6.2	28	3	53	290	7	1

==== Super Bowl ====
Year	SB	Team	Opp.	Passing								Rushing				Result
Year	SB	Team	Opp.	Cmp	Att	Pct	Yds	Y/A	TD	Int	Rtg	Att	Yds	Y/A	TD	Result
2013	XLVIII	SEA	DEN	**18**	**25**	**72.0**	206	8.2	**2**	**0**	**123.1**	**3**	26	8.7	0	**W** 43–8
2014	XLIX	SEA	NE	12	21	57.1	**247**	**11.8**	**2**	1	110.6	**3**	**39**	**13.0**	0	L 28–24
Career				30	46	65.2	453	9.9	4	1	117.4	6	65	10.8	0	W−L 1–1

=== College ===
Legend
Led the NCAA

Season	Team	Games			Passing								Rushing			
Season	Team	GP	GS	Record	Cmp	Att	Pct	Yds	Avg	TD	Int	Rtg	Att	Yds	Avg	TD
2007	NC State	Redshirt (redshirt)														
2008	NC State	12	11	6–5	150	275	54.5	1,955	7.1	17	1	133.9	116	394	3.4	4
2009	NC State	12	12	5–7	224	378	59.3	3,027	8.0	31	11	147.8	103	260	2.5	4
2010	NC State	13	13	9–4	**308**	**527**	58.4	**3,563**	6.8	28	**14**	127.5	**143**	**435**	3.0	**9**
2011	Wisconsin	14	14	**11–3**	225	309	**72.8**	3,175	**10.3**	**33**	4	**191.8**	79	338	**4.3**	6
Career		51	50	31–19	907	1,489	60.9	11,720	7.9	109	30	147.2	441	1,427	3.2	23

== Career highlights ==
=== Awards and honors ===
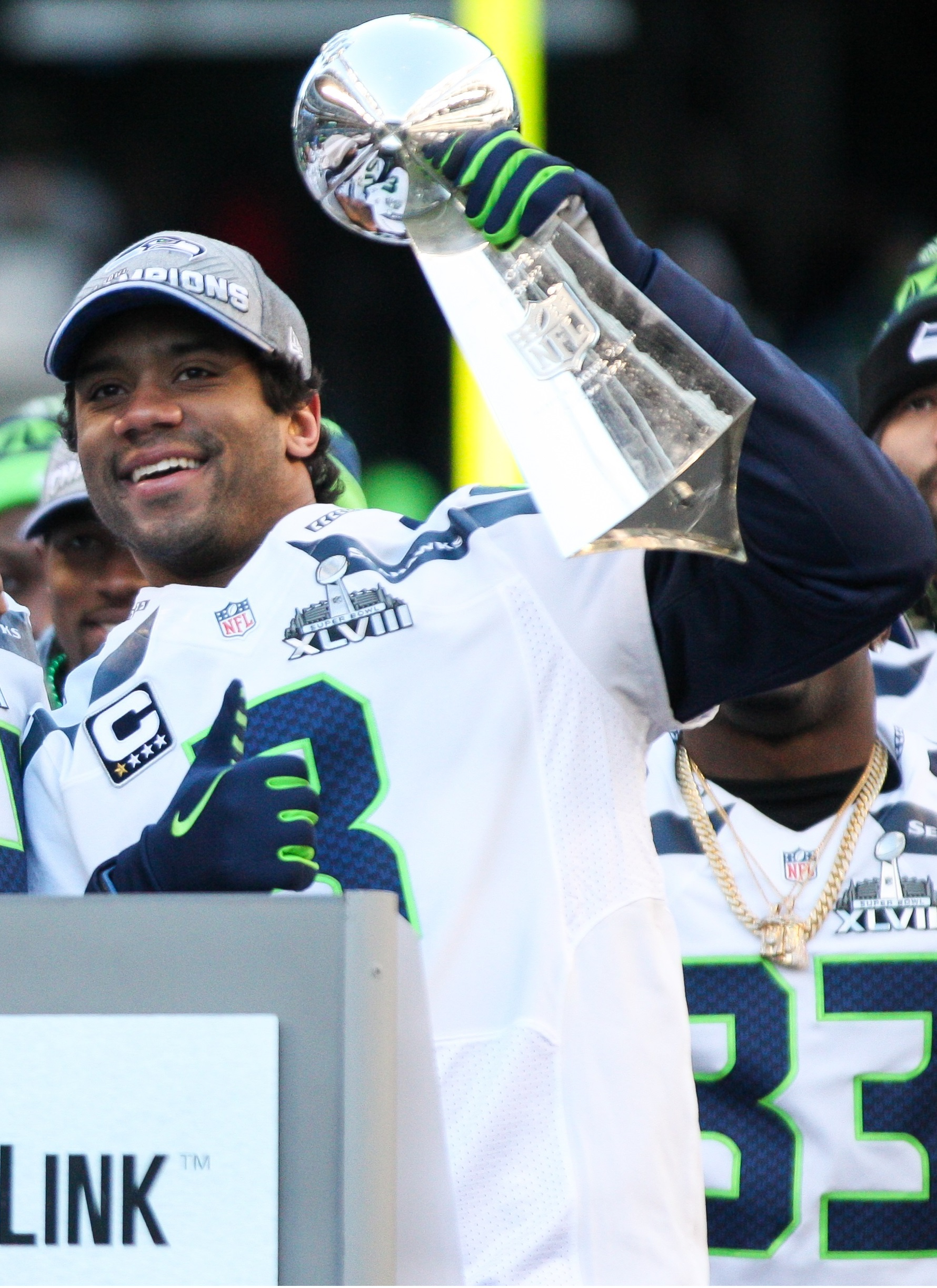
Wilson with the Lombardi Trophy after leading the Seahawks to win Super Bowl XLVIII

NFL

- Super Bowl XLVIII champion
- 2× NFC champion (2013, 2014)
- Walter Payton NFL Man of the Year (2020)
- Pepsi NFL Rookie of the Year (2012)
- Second-team All-Pro (2019)
- 10× Pro Bowl (2012–2015, 2017–2021, 2024)
- Pro Bowl Offensive MVP (2015)
- NFL passer rating leader (2015)
- NFL passing touchdowns leader (2017)
- Bart Starr Award (2022)
- PFWA Good Guy Award (2014)
- 3× Steve Largent Award (2012, 2018, 2019)
- Seattle Seahawks Top 50 Players
- NFC Offensive Player of the Month (September 2020)
- NFL Offensive Rookie of the Month (December 2012)
- 11× NFC Offensive Player of the Week
- Pepsi NFL Rookie of the Week (Week 10, 2012)
- 7× FedEx Air Player of the Week
- 10× NFL Top 100 — 51st (2013), 20th (2014), 22nd (2015), 17th (2016), 24th (2017), 11th (2018), 25th (2019), 2nd (2020), 12th (2021), 61st (2022)

College

- Big Ten Quarterback of the Year (2011)
- NCAA passer rating leader (2011)
- First-team All-Big Ten (2011)
- ACC Rookie of the Year (2008)
- ACC Offensive Rookie of the Year (2008)
- First-team All-ACC (2008)
- Second-team All-ACC (2010)
- NC State Wolfpack jersey No. 16 honored

MLS

- 2019 MLS Cup Champion (as part owner of the Seattle Sounders FC)

=== Records ===
==== NFL records ====
- Most passing yards in a playoff game by a rookie: 385
- Most fourth quarter touchdown passes in a season: 16 (2017)

==== Seattle Seahawks records ====
- Highest passer rating, career (minimum 500 attempts): 101.8
- Highest passer rating, season (minimum 200 attempts): 110.9, 2018
- Highest passer rating, rookie season (minimum 200 attempts): 100.0
- Highest completion percentage, rookie season (minimum 200 attempts): 64.1
- Lowest percentage passes intercepted, career (minimum 500 attempts): 1.80
- Lowest percentage passes intercepted, rookie season (minimum 200 attempts): 2.54
- Most rushing yards by a quarterback, career: 4,689
- Most rushing yards by a quarterback, season: 849, 2014
- Most rushing yards by a quarterback, rookie season: 489
- Highest yard rushing average, career (minimum 400 attempts): 5.5
- Highest yard rushing average, season (minimum 100 attempts): 7.2
- Most passing yards, career: 37,059
- Most passing yards, rookie season: 3,118
- Most passing yards, game: 452 on October 29, 2017, against the Houston Texans
- Most passing touchdowns, career: 292
- Most passing touchdowns, season: 40, 2020
- Most passing touchdowns, rookie season: 26
- Most passing touchdowns, game (tied with three others): 5
- Most games with a passing touchdown, career: 137

== Broadcasting career ==
On June 1, 2026, Wilson accepted a deal with CBS Sports to join its Sunday pregame show.

== Baseball career ==
After graduating from high school, Wilson was selected by the Baltimore Orioles as the fifth pick in the 41st round (1,222nd overall) of the 2007 MLB draft. The Orioles considered Wilson a talent worthy of the first ten rounds and offered him a $350,000 signing bonus, the third-largest they offered a draftee that year after Matt Wieters ($6 million) and Jake Arrieta ($1.1 million). Wilson instead chose to attend NC State that fall. In a 2008 interview, Wilson said, "I was leaning towards [entering the draft], but a college education is something you'll always have."

=== College baseball ===
Wilson was a member of the NC State Wolfpack baseball team from 2008 to 2010, and in the summer of 2009 played for the Gastonia Grizzlies, a collegiate summer baseball team in the Coastal Plain League. He hit .282/.384/.415 with five home runs and 30 runs batted in (RBIs) during his collegiate career.

=== Professional baseball ===
Russell Wilson
- Second baseman
- Bats: Right Throws: Right
- Stats at Baseball Reference

On June 8, 2010, Wilson was drafted by the Colorado Rockies in the fourth round (140th pick overall) of the 2010 MLB draft. That summer he played 32 games as a second baseman for the Tri-City Dust Devils, the Class A Short Season affiliate of the Rockies in the Northwest League. He finished the season with two home runs, 11 RBIs, and a .230 batting average.

In the summer of 2011, Wilson played 61 games for the Asheville Tourists, the Class A affiliate of the Colorado Rockies in the South Atlantic League. He hit three home runs with 15 RBIs and a .228 batting average. In January 2012, Wilson informed the Rockies that he would be pursuing a career in the NFL and would not report to spring training for the 2012 season.

On December 12, 2013, Wilson was acquired from the Rockies by the Texas Rangers in the Triple-A phase of the Rule 5 draft. Wilson attended Rangers spring training in Surprise, Arizona, in 2014 and 2015.

On February 7, 2018, Wilson was traded from the Rangers to the New York Yankees and assigned to the Yankees' Double-A affiliate, the Trenton Thunder. Wilson grew up as a Yankees fan and promised his late father that he would one day wear the Yankees uniform. On March 2, Wilson pinch-hit for Aaron Judge in the fifth inning of a Spring Training game against the Atlanta Braves, his first appearance in a professional baseball game since 2011. He struck out on five pitches from Braves pitcher Max Fried.

== Business ventures and endorsements ==
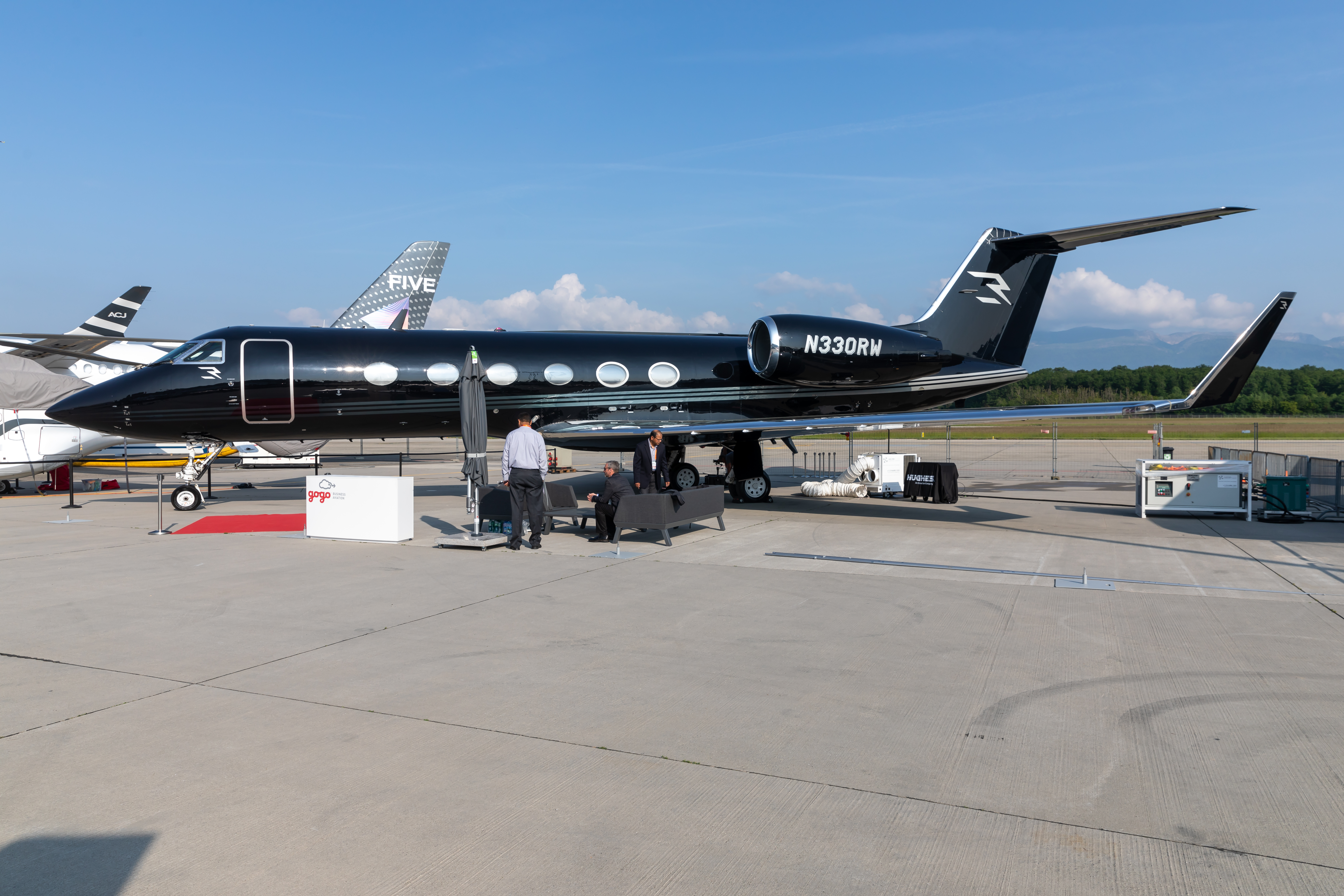
Gulfstream G-IV owned by his West2East production company

On April 26, 2012, Wilson announced he had chosen French/West/Vaughan as his marketing, public relations, and endorsements agency. Since being named the starting quarterback of the Seahawks in August 2012, Wilson has appeared in advertisements for Levi's, American Family Insurance, Pepsi, Nike, Alaska Airlines, Microsoft, Duracell, Braun, Bose, United Way, and Larson Automotive Group.

In 2014, Wilson became part-owner and endorser of Eat the Ball, a European bread company. In 2015, he began endorsing Luvo, a frozen food company, and Reliant Recovery Water. On February 29, 2016, Wilson launched Good Man Brand, a clothing line which he co-founded. In August 2016, it was announced that Wilson had partnered with Juice Press to open the company's first Seattle franchise.

On November 14, 2016, Wilson announced he had joined Chris Hansen, Wally Walker, and Erik and Pete Nordstrom as partners in the investment group working to bring a new sports arena to Seattle's SoDo neighborhood for potential NBA and NHL teams.

In 2017, Wilson founded a fan network platform to connect fans with celebrities called TraceMe. TraceMe launched its public beta on September 8, 2017, and announced $9 million in Series A funding with investors including Jeff Bezos' Bezos Expeditions, Alibaba co-founder Joe Tsai, and YouTube co-founder Chad Hurley.

On November 20, 2017, football helmet manufacturer VICIS announced a $7 million investment round which included Wilson as an investor.

In June 2018, Wilson and his wife Ciara announced they were joining an effort to bring a Major League Baseball franchise to Portland, Oregon. In July 2018, Wilson became an investor and endorser for Molecule, a mattress company.

In September 2018, Wilson was announced as the next athlete to appear on the cover of the Wheaties cereal box.

In August 2019, Wilson and Ciara announced that they had joined the ownership group of Seattle Sounders FC, the local Major League Soccer club. The Sounders went on to win the MLS Cup 2019, giving Wilson an MLS Cup to his credit as part owner.

In January 2020, Wilson was named Chairman of NFL FLAG. The global partnership will focus on strengthening NFL FLAG domestically and expanding the league internationally. He has worked with the flag football organizations in China, Brazil, Canada, and the United Kingdom to help spread awareness of the sport and get athletes engaged in the game at a young age. More recently, both Wilson and Ciara struck first look deal with Amazon Studios.

== In popular culture ==
Wilson has appeared on the cover of several magazines including Sports Illustrated, Sports Illustrated Kids, Rolling Stone, ESPN The Magazine, Men's Fitness, Essence, and Men's Health.

Rapper Eminem mentions Wilson in his 2013 song, "The Monster":

"It's payback, Russell Wilson falling way back / In the draft, turn nothing into something, still can make that / Straw into gold chump, I will spin Rumpelstiltskin in a haystack"

Wilson has appeared on Late Show with David Letterman, Jimmy Kimmel Live!, Late Night with Seth Meyers, Charlie Rose, and in the 2015 film Entourage. He hosted the 2015, 2016, and 2017 Kids' Choice Sports on Nickelodeon.

Wilson was the keynote speaker for the commencement address at both of his alma maters in 2016 at the University of Wisconsin–Madison and in 2021 at North Carolina State University. He was also the keynote speaker at Dartmouth College's commencement in 2022.

== Personal life ==
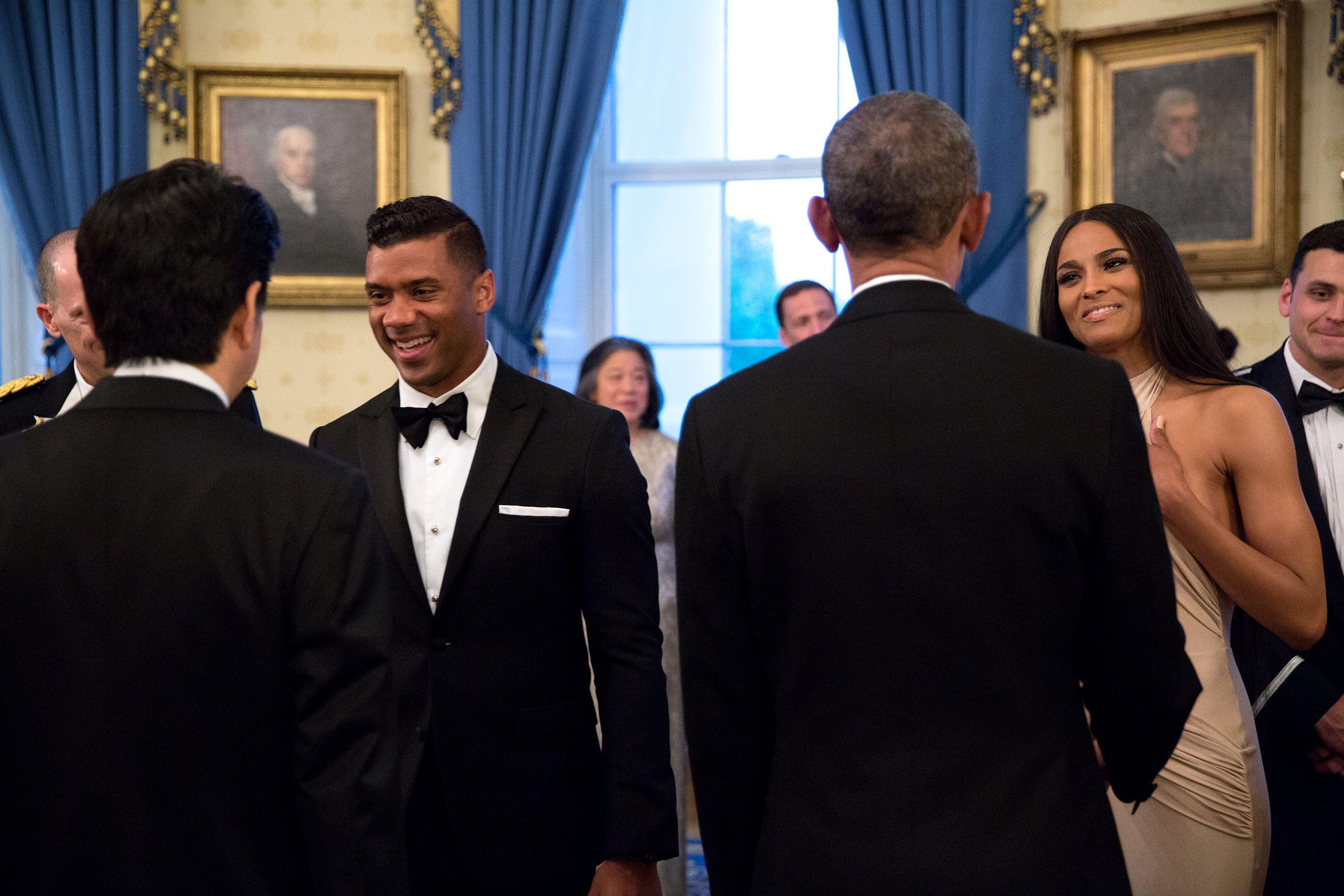
Wilson and then-girlfriend (later wife) Ciara meet Barack Obama and Shinzō Abe at the White House on April 28, 2015.

Wilson met his first wife, Ashton Meem, while they were both high school students. They married in January 2012 and divorced in April 2014.

Wilson is married to American R&B singer Ciara. They began dating in early 2015 and announced their engagement on March 11, 2016. They were married on July 6, 2016, at Peckforton Castle in Cheshire, England. He has a stepson from her relationship with Future. Their elder daughter was born on April 28, 2017. Their son was born on July 23, 2020. Their second daughter was born on December 11, 2023.

While Wilson was playing for the Seahawks, he and Ciara lived in the Seattle suburb of Bellevue, Washington, until selling their home in April 2022 for $36 million. In 2022, the couple purchased a home in Cherry Hills Village, Colorado, for $25 million, setting the record for the most expensive home purchase in the Denver metropolitan area. Wilson also has a house in San Diego.

Wilson is a devout Christian. He frequently speaks about his Christian faith on his social media accounts. Wilson and Ciara vowed to be celibate until they married.

His net worth as of March 2025 is $283 million.

Wilson's younger sister Anna played basketball at Stanford.

In September 2021, Wilson and Ciara announced that they were writing a children's book called Why Not You? to help kids pursue their dreams. The book was co-written with JaNay Brown-Wood, published by Random House, and released on March 1, 2022; it received a starred review from the School Library Journal and was a New York Times bestseller.

== Charitable work ==
Wilson was an active volunteer in the Seattle community. During the NFL season, Wilson made weekly visits on his days off to the Seattle Children's Hospital, and also visited soldiers at Joint Base Lewis-McChord. In the offseason, Wilson hosts the Russell Wilson Passing Academy, a youth football camp, in several cities. In 2012, proceeds from the camp went to the Charles Ray III Diabetes Association, for which Wilson is the National Ambassador. In 2013 and 2014, Wilson partnered with Russell Investments for its "Invested with Russell" program, which donated $3,000 to Wilson's charitable foundation for every touchdown he scored.

Wilson co-hosts an annual charity golf event along with NASCAR driver Kasey Kahne at Suncadia Resort in Cle Elum, Washington, to support various organizations, including Boys & Girls Clubs of America and the Seattle Children's Hospital. In August 2016, Wilson's Why Not You Foundation raised $1,060,005 for the Seattle Children's Hospital's Strong Against Cancer initiative. The Why Not You Foundation also supported Friends of the Children, a nonprofit mentoring organization.

In March 2020, Wilson and Ciara partnered with Food Lifeline to donate one million meals to those in need during the COVID-19 pandemic.

In May 2022, Wilson and Ciara received the Paul G. Allen Humanitarian Award for their philanthropic and humanitarian contributions to Seattle.

In July 2022, Wilson and Ciara pledged to donate $500,000 to nonprofit organizations in Colorado.

== See also ==
- List of NCAA Division I FBS passing touchdowns leaders
- List of NCAA major college football yearly passing leaders
- List of Denver Broncos starting quarterbacks
- List of New York Giants starting quarterbacks
- List of Pittsburgh Steelers starting quarterbacks
- List of Seattle Seahawks starting quarterbacks
- List of Super Bowl starting quarterbacks
- List of NFL annual passing touchdowns leaders
- List of NFL career passing touchdowns leaders
- List of NFL career passing yards leaders
- List of NFL quarterbacks who have posted a perfect passer rating
