= Lyfe =

Lyfe may refer to:

- Lyfe (EP), an extended play by American rapper Yeat
- DJ Lyfe, former turntablist and co-songwriter of the band Incubus
- Lyfe Jennings, an American R&B and soul singer-songwriter, record producer, and instrumentalist
- Lyfe (food company), an American restaurant and grocery foods company
