= Jake McGee (American football) =

American football player (born 1991)

No. 83, 80
- Position: Tight end

Personal information
- Born: September 19, 1991 (age 35); Richmond, Virginia
- Listed height: 6 ft 5 in (1.96 m)
- Listed weight: 250 lb (113 kg)

Career information
- High school: Collegiate School (Richmond, Virginia)
- College: Virginia (2010–2013); Florida (2014–2015)
- NFL draft: 2016: undrafted

Career history
- Carolina Panthers (2016)*; Oakland Raiders (2016)*; San Diego Chargers/Los Angeles Chargers (2016–2017)*; Pittsburgh Steelers (2017–2018)
- * Offseason or practice squad member only

Awards and highlights
- Second team All-Southeastern Conference (2015)
- Stats at Pro Football Reference

Jake McGee (born September 19, 1991) is an American former football tight end. He played college football for the Virginia Cavaliers and the Florida Gators.

== Early life ==
McGee grew up in Richmond, Virginia and attended Collegiate School, where he lettered in football and basketball. At Collegiate, he helped the football team win two back-to-back state titles during his junior and senior year in 2008 and 2009. He finished his senior season with 3,007 yards, 34 touchdowns on 212-of-348 passing attempts, 576 rushing yards, 11 scores and 60 solo tackles at free safety. He was a two-star rated recruit and committed to play college football at the University of Virginia.

== College career ==
=== Virginia ===
McGee was redshirted during his true freshman season in 2010. During the 2011 season, he played in all 13 games, finishing the season with eight tackles on special teams and a forced fumble against Indiana along with a fumble recovery. During the 2012 season, he played in all 12 games and started three of them, finishing the season with five touchdown receptions, 28 receptions for 374 yards and eight total tackles (four solo and assisted). During the 2013 season, he played in 11 games missing only one against Louisiana Tech due to a lower extremity injury and he started three games. He finished the season with 43 receptions, 395 receiving yards, two touchdown receptions and two solo tackles.

On April 25, 2014, McGee announced that he would be transferring from Virginia.

=== Florida ===
On May 9, 2014, McGee announced that he would transfer to Florida.

During the 2014 season, he would play only one game before suffering a season-ending injury in the first half of the season opener against Eastern Michigan and would ultimately receive a medical waiver and was redshirted. He would then be granted a sixth year of eligibility after the injury. During the 2015 season, he played in and started 13 games missing the finale due to an injury, along with being named one of eight John Mackey Award semifinalists and earned Second Team All-SEC honors by the Associated Press. He finished the season with 41 receptions for 381 yards and four touchdown receptions.

He would later be invited to play for the 2016 Senior Bowl.

== Professional career ==
Pre-draft measurables
Height	Weight	Arm length	Hand span	Bench press
6 ft 5 1/2 in (1.97 m)	250 lb (113 kg)	32 3/8 in (0.82 m)	9 5/8 in (0.24 m)	17 reps
All values from NFL Scouting Combine

=== Carolina Panthers ===
After going undrafted in the 2016 NFL draft, McGee signed with the Carolina Panthers on May 2, 2016. He was waived on May 20, 2016, and was placed on injury reserve three days later. He was released on May 25, 2016.

=== Oakland Raiders ===
On August 16, 2016, McGee signed to play for the Oakland Raiders. He was then released on September 4, 2016.

=== San Diego Chargers/Los Angeles Chargers ===
On September 5, 2016 just a day after being released from the Raiders, McGee signed to play for the San Diego Chargers. On January 2, 2017, he was placed on the reserve/future list. On February 6, 2017, he was activated from the list. He was released on May 2, 2017.

=== Pittsburgh Steelers ===
On August 2, 2017, McGee signed to play for the Pittsburgh Steelers. He was waived on September 2, 2017, but was assigned to the practice squad the next day. On June 5, 2018, he was placed on the injured reserve list.
