= Collegiate School (Richmond, Virginia) =

Private school in Virginia, US

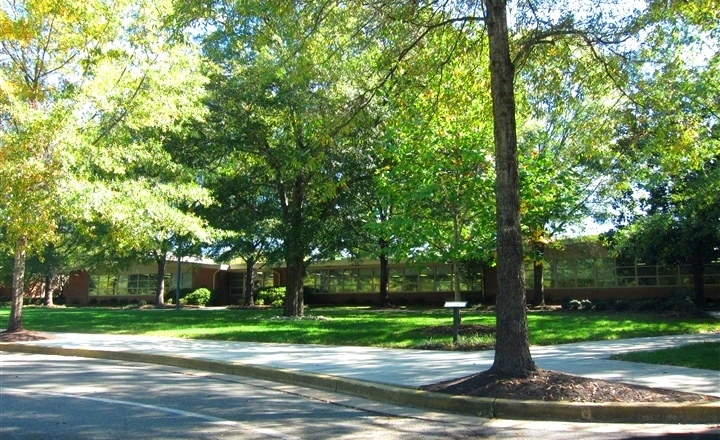

Location
- 103 North Mooreland Road; Richmond, Virginia 23229; United States; 37°34′41.8″N 77°35′13.6″W

Information
- Type: Private, day, college prep
- Motto: Parat. Ditat. Durat. (Prepare, Enrich, Endure)
- Religious affiliation: Nonsectarian
- Established: 1915; 111 years ago
- Head of school: Jeff Mancabelli
- Faculty: 218
- Grades: JK–12
- Gender: Co-educational
- Enrollment: 1,600
- Campus type: Suburban
- Colors: Green and Gold
- Slogan: Minds that Seek, Hearts that Serve
- Song: Hail Collegiate
- Mascot: Cougar
- Nickname: Cougars
- Team name: Collegiate Cougars
- Accreditations: Southern Association of Independent Schools; Virginia Association of Independent Schools
- Publication: The Spark, The Magazine for Collegiate School
- Newspaper: Creative Voices (Student Newspaper) and The Flame (Creative Arts)
- Yearbook: The Torch
- Endowment: $84,605,000 (as of June 30, 2022)
- School fees: Books & Supplies: $80–$650; Laptops: $900
- Tuition: $19,560–$32,820 (2024–25)
- Website: www.collegiate-va.org

Collegiate School is a private, day, preparatory school for boys and girls located in Richmond, Virginia, United States. The student body of Collegiate comprises about 1,600 total students from Junior Kindergarten through Grade 12. The Lower School and Upper School are coeducational, while the Middle School is coordinated with boys and girls in separate classes.

== History ==
Collegiate was founded in 1915, by Helen Baker as the Collegiate School for Girls, a college preparatory school located in downtown Richmond. In addition to this campus in town, Collegiate opened the Collegiate Country Day School, off Mooreland and River roads, in 1953 Collegiate's Town School and the Country Day School merged on Mooreland Road in 1960. Today, Collegiate still remains on the Mooreland Road campus and has purchased over 155 acres (0.63 km^{2}) in Goochland County. Collegiate had already developed 60 of these acres for athletic purposes.

== Notable alumni ==
- Ann Cottrell Free (1934), journalist and author
- Ray Easterling (1968), former safety for Atlanta Falcons
- Eugene Welch Hickok (1968), former U.S. Deputy Secretary of Education
- Stanley Druckenmiller (1971), investment manager
- Steve Kelley (1977), syndicated cartoonist
- Robert Wrenn (1977), professional golfer
- Eric Cantor (1981), House Majority Leader (2011–2014), Member of the United States House of Representatives from Virginia's 7th district (2001–2014)
- David Allen Schools (1983), Widespread Panic bassist
- Mike Henry (1984), actor, producer, and screenwriter for Family Guy, voice of Cleveland Brown, Herbert, Consuela, Bruce and various other characters
- Robert Ukrop (1988), former professional soccer player for the Davidson Wildcats, Richmond Kickers, and New England Revolution
- Thomas T. Cullen (1996), United States District Judge and former United States Attorney for the Western District of Virginia
- Matt Reid (1996), baseball coach for the Florida Gulf Coast Eagles
- Bret Myers (1998), soccer player and professor
- Scottie Thompson (2000), actress (NCIS, Trauma)
- Russell Wilson (2007), quarterback for the Pittsburgh Steelers, Super Bowl XLVIII champion, businessman, and a minority owner of the Seattle Sounders FC
- Jake McGee (2010), professional football tight end
- Wilton Speight (2014), starting quarterback at University of California, Los Angeles (2018) and University of Michigan (2016–2017)
- Evan Justice (2017), pitcher for the Colorado Rockies
