= Peter Free =

English cricketer (born 1971)

Personal information
- Full name: Peter John Free
- Born: 6 December 1971 (age 54); Norwich, Norfolk, England
- Batting: Right-handed
- Bowling: Right-arm medium

Domestic team information
- Years: Team
- 2000–2008: Norfolk

Career statistics
Competition	List A
Matches	4
Runs scored	18
Batting average	9.00
100s/50s	–/–
Top score	12*
Balls bowled	–
Wickets	–
Bowling average	–
5 wickets in innings	–
10 wickets in match	–
Best bowling	–
Catches/stumpings	–/–
- Source: Cricinfo, 28 June 2011

Peter John Free (born 6 December 1971) is a former English cricketer. Free was a right-handed batsman who bowled right-arm medium pace. He was born in Norwich, Norfolk.

Free made his debut for Norfolk in the 2000 Minor Counties Championship against Cumberland. Free played Minor counties cricket for Norfolk from 2000 to 2008, which included 9 Minor Counties Championship matches and 10 MCCA Knockout Trophy matches. He made his List A debut against Cornwall in the 2000 NatWest Trophy. He made 3 further List A appearances, the last coming against the Somerset Cricket Board in the 2nd round of the 2002 Cheltenham & Gloucester Trophy, which was played in 2001. In his 4 List A matches, he scored 18 runs at an average of 9.00, with a high score of 12 not out.
