= Ann Cottrell Free =

American journalist

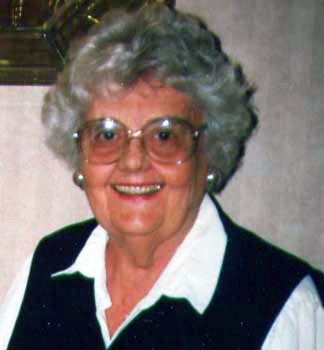
- Born: June 4, 1916; Richmond, Virginia, U.S.
- Died: October 30, 2004 (aged 88); Washington, D.C., U.S.
- Education: Collegiate School; Barnard College
- Occupation: Journalist
- Spouse: James S. Free

Ann Cottrell Free (June 4, 1916 – October 30, 2004) was an American journalist who wrote extensively on animal protection issues.

== Biography ==
Free was born in Richmond, Virginia on June 4, 1916. A graduate of Collegiate School and Barnard College, she became the first woman Washington correspondent for the New York Herald Tribune, Newsweek and the Chicago Sun, where she covered First Lady Eleanor Roosevelt and wartime-Washington.

After the war she served in China as a special correspondent for the United Nations Relief and Rehabilitation Administration and in Europe for the Marshall Plan. She later wrote for the North American Newspaper Alliance and was a contributing columnist to The Washington Post, the Washington Star, other newspapers and syndicates. An Albert Schweitzer Medalist, she was also the recipient of a variety of humanitarian and writing awards for her novel, Forever the Wild Mare, as well as her other animal writing.

She initiated the establishment of the Rachel Carson National Wildlife Refuge and presented testimony on numerous animal protection issues to Congressional committees.

She authored three books, Forever the Wild Mare (Dodd Mead 1963), No Room, Save in the Heart (Flying Fox Press 1987) and Animals, Nature and Albert Schweitzer (Flying Fox Press, 2000). She received the Rachel Carson Legacy Award in 1988 and in 1996 was inducted into the Virginia Communications Hall of Fame.

She was married to journalist James S. Free, and, for a time, they co-authored Whirligig, a syndicated column about Washington politics.

Her oral histories are in the collections of Columbia University and the National Press Club. She died on October 30, 2004, at the age of 88 in Washington, D.C. A year later, the National Press Club Ann Cottrell Free Animal Reporting Award was established to inspire and encourage other journalists to follow in her footsteps. In 2008 she was one of twenty three women featured in the book They Made Their Mark: An Illustrated History of the Society of Woman Geographers (Globe Pequot Press). In 2023, she was included in a permanent exhibit at the Centre Schweitzer in Kaysersberg, France, as one of 10 people whose work for world peace was inspired by Albert Schweitzer.

Her personal and professional papers are housed at the Library of Congress.
