= Marcella Free =

American businesswoman

Marcella Jones Free (September 17, 1920 – November 23, 2007) was respected as one of the advertising industry's leading copywriters. She was a pioneering woman in the business and was the first female Creative Director at N. W. Ayer in Philadelphia in the 1940s.

With her former husband, F. William Free, she created a number of famous and memorable campaigns for companies such as Nescafé, Coca-Cola, Purina, National Airlines, Pfizer and Gillette, among others. One of her more memorable campaigns was a commercial for Nair, featuring girls singing "Who wears short shorts? We wear short shorts! If you dare wear short shorts, Nair for short shorts." This song was based on the hit 1958 hit "Short Shorts" by The Royal Teens.

She was a founding partner of the agency Avrett Free Ginsberg. She retired to her house in Water Mill, New York, and died in Rye in 2007.
