= James S. Free =

American journalist (1908–1996)

- Born: James Stillman Free; November 5, 1908; Gordo, Alabama, U.S.
- Died: April 3, 1996 (aged 87)
- Education: University of Alabama (B.A.); Columbia University (M.A., journalism)
- Occupation: Journalist
- Employer: Birmingham News
- Known for: Washington-reporting; Whirligig
- Spouse: Ann Cottrell Free (m. 1950)

James Stillman Free (November 5, 1908 – April 3, 1996) was an American journalist whose 50 years of Washington-based reporting included coverage of 10 presidential administrations, seven national political conventions, the Cold War, labor relations, civil rights, and the space program.

For 33 years he served as the Washington correspondent for the Birmingham News. In a Congressional Record tribute, Sen. Howell Heflin of Alabama said of Free, "his name and writings became synonymous with Alabama political coverage and analysis in the nation's capital." Because of his pivotal reporting during the civil rights struggle, Free had unusually open access to Attorney General Robert F. Kennedy.

Free was chairman of the Standing Committee of Correspondents of the Congressional Press Galleries and was president of the Washington chapter of the Society of Professional Journalists, as well as a member of its hall of fame.

For many years Free served as the historian of the Gridiron Club, an organization of Washington journalists. He wrote a book about the club's history, entitled, The First One Hundred Years: A Casual Chronicle of the Gridiron Club.

Before establishing the Birmingham News bureau in Washington, Free worked for the paper in Birmingham, and for the Richmond Times-Dispatch, the Washington Star, the Chicago Sun and the Raleigh News & Observer.

His reporting received recognition in 1953 from the Raymond Clapper Award Committee for his coverage of national affairs, and he received an outstanding alumnus award from the University of Alabama.

Free, a native of Gordo, who grew up in Tuscaloosa, received his bachelor's degree from the University of Alabama and his master's degree in journalism from Columbia University.

In 1932, Free briefly partnered with L. Ron Hubbard, who later founded the Church of Scientology. They co-directed an unsuccessful sailing expedition in the Caribbean on the Doris Hamlin, which was to have included the production of a film and the collection of flora and fauna.

Free served in the U.S. Navy in the Caribbean and Pacific during World War II and retired from the Naval Reserve as a captain in 1968.

In 1950 he married journalist Ann Cottrell Free and for a time they co-authored Whirligig, a daily syndicated column about Washington politics.

His professional papers are in the manuscript division of the Library of Congress and his professional oral history is in the collection of the National Press Club.
