= F. William Free =

American advertising executive

- Born: August 28, 1928; Pittsburgh, Pennsylvania, U.S.
- Died: January 1, 2003 (aged 74)
- Occupation: Advertising executive
- Years active: 1950–2003

F. William Free (August 28, 1928 – January 1, 2003) was an American advertising executive. He is best remembered for the controversial 1971 advertising slogan for National Airlines, "I'm Cheryl – Fly Me."

== Career ==
=== Early career and Marschalk years ===
He began his advertising career in 1950 as a junior art director at N. W. Ayer & Son in Philadelphia. After working as an art director for J. Walter Thompson in London and Foote, Cone & Belding in New York, he became creative director of the Marschalk Company in 1959. During his time at Marschalk, Free introduced New York to the first soda brands to be added by the Coca-Cola company; Sprite, Tab and Fresca. His Fresca campaign featured a memorable exploit. Commercials for the citrus-flavored drink labeled it as having the "frosty taste of a blizzard", and were first published in winter 1967. The day after the ad was first shown, a foot of snow fell in New York. Free marched out into the blizzard and was photographed with a bottle of Fresca in his hand. He took a full-page newspaper advertisement out in The New York Times the next day, announcing "New York. I'm sorry." He later became president of Marschalk. He opened his agency, F. William Free & Company, in 1969 with his wife, Marcella.

=== Controversial advertisements ===
Free is best remembered for the controversial 1971 advertising slogan for National Airlines, "I'm Cheryl – Fly Me." The slogan caused women's rights groups to protest outside his office in New York City carrying signs reading "I'm Bill-Fire Me." The campaign's notoriety paid off for National, and they saw an increase in revenue per passenger mile. The next year he created another ad, "I'm Eileen – Fly Me", this time featuring an 8-year-old girl who aspires to be a flight attendant. He also reprised the original ad, saying: "Millions of people flew me last year."

Another well known ad campaign of his was for the Silva Thins cigarettes of the American Tobacco Company. Some of Free's ads for Silva Thins were almost as notorious as the Cheryl ads. One, in 1970, went, "Cigarettes are like women. The best ones are thin and rich", which prompted the National Organization for Women to demand a boycott of the brand.

=== Later career ===
He sold F. William Free & Company to Daniel & Charles after his divorce in 1981. The agency changed its name to Laurence, Charles & Free after the acquisition. At the new agency of Laurence, Charles & Free he was a key player in popularization of the tequila sunrise with his ads for José Cuervo.

== Personal life ==
Free was born in Pittsburgh, Pennsylvania, in 1928. He was also a champion horse breeder. One of the horses he bred, Packett's Landing, accumulated earnings of $799,769. He married twice, first to Marcella Free (née Jones), and then to Mary Anne Free (née Murry). Free had four children, Abagail, Adam and Molly with Jones, and Samantha with Murry. He was a longtime prominent resident of Millbrook, New York. He died in 2003, from complications of lung cancer.

== Sources ==
- Philip H. Dougherty (September 22, 1981). "Advertising; Lombardo & Willis Part of F. William Free". The New York Times.
- "Molly F. Free Marries John Hall McClement". The New York Times. June 5, 1988.
- August, Melissa; Bland, Elizabeth L.; Gregory, Sean; Horowitz, Janice M.; McLaughlin, Lisa; Winters, Rebecca (January 20, 2003). "Milestones". Time. Archived from the original on September 30, 2007.
- Stuart Lavietes (January 8, 2003). "F. William Free, 74, Ad Man Behind 'Fly Me'". The New York Times.
