= Steve Free =

American musician

Steve Free (born September 16, 1950) is an American musician.

== Early career ==
Steve Free was born near Portsmouth, Ohio, on September 16, 1950. When he was three, he moved to Tucson, Arizona, for a brief time, and before returning to Ohio at age 9, where he graduated from Northwest High School in Scioto County, Ohio, in 1968. He served in the Air Force from 1969 to 1973, where he started playing the guitar and began writing songs.

Around this time, he met Philadelphia, Pennsylvania native John Starkey and formed a folk trio in Philadelphia. There, they recorded and released songs on two small record labels. In 1990, Free signed with Fraternity Records, which is his current label. He shot to national attention in 1993 with his song about the Ohio Prison riot entitled "Siege at Lucasville", which was used by the television series 48 Hours when they covered the story about the prison riot on their program.

== Today ==
Free is a known recording artist who has been called the "Appalachian Jimmy Buffett." Additionally, Cashbox Records has labeled him one of the most diverse artists known in music today. Free won eight ASCAP Awards, received a Platinum Award, and charted 14 songs on the national and international charts, including his "number one" song "Just a Baby Boy". In 2008, he was awarded the State of Ohio's Governor's Award as "Individual Artist." He received an arts award from the Kentucky State Senate in 2009 for his musical contributions to Appalachia. He has charted over 40 songs on the National and International Charts and has 3 Americana Music Award nominations.

In 1996, he was named International Independent Recording Artist of the Year, in 2008, he won the Governor's Award as the #1 Artist in his home state of Ohio, and in 2009, he was honored by the Kentucky State Senate for his musical contributions to Appalachia. He is an Ohio Arts Council and Midwest Arts Council "Ohio Artist On Tour ".

In 2000, he received a lifetime achievement award from Airplay International in Nashville for his decades of international airplay. His song "Siege at Lucasville", about the 1993 Ohio prison riot, was filmed by CBS TV's 48 Hours in 1996, and his song "Our Hometown" is featured in the PBS documentary Beyond These Walls.

In 200,9 he was honored by being named an Official "Ohio Treasure".

In 2014, he performed on PBS, NPR, and The Nashville Network and was featured in the AFM International Magazine, GTE Music Magazine in Nashville, and numerous other music industry magazines and newspaper articles.

== Song history ==
In 2012, he began writing a song titled "A Million Years" before his mother, Florence Elizabeth (Thompson) LeBrun Free Wagner, died on December 19, 2012. He recorded it in 2014 in memory of his mother. She never got to hear the song but she did get to see the lyrics of it.

== Venues ==
Steve Free and his band are dedicated to performing throughout the Tri-State area at diverse locations such as Camden Park and smaller venues such as Moyer's Winery and the Ye Olde Lantern in Portsmouth, Ohio they also perform at various festivals in the southern Ohio area.
