= LYFE Kitchen =

American restaurant chain

- Industry: Restaurants
- Founded: 2011
- Founder: Mike Roberts; Stephen Sidwell; Mike Donahue
- Headquarters: Chicago, Illinois, U.S.
- Number of locations: 3 (2018)
- Area served: United States-Illinois
- Key people: Gail Taggart (CEO)
- Website: www.LYFEKitchen.com

LYFE Kitchen is an American fast-casual restaurant chain operating in Illinois. The company's name is an acronym that stands for "Love Your Food Everyday". LYFE promises functional, locally sourced foods and does not use artificial ingredients. They strive to use 100% biodegradable, compostable, recyclable packaging.

LYFE was founded in 2011 by Mike Roberts, the former global president of McDonald's, Stephen Sidwell, and Mike Donahue, McDonald's former chief of corporate communications in Palo Alto, California.

== History ==
Roberts' business partner, Stephen Sidwell, approached Roberts and Mike Donahue (also a former McDonald's executive) with a business idea for a healthier brand of fast-food. By March 2010, they had created a sample menu with the help of Oprah's celebrity chefs, Art Smith and Tal Ronnen.

In August 2011, LYFE Kitchen opened it first location in Palo Alto, California. Then CEO Mike Roberts told the Palo Alto Patch, "We chose Palo Alto because of the people, because of the innovative spirit here. Because a lot of early adopters to movements that move across the country start here in California. We can get our produce here fresh, local, organic, hormone-free, antibiotic-free, all within a hundred miles of Palo Alto". The restaurant was met with positive reviews from critics and locals, and the company soon expanded to other locations throughout California. By 2013, LYFE Kitchen opened its first franchise location in Chicago.

During 2013, the "Lyfe Kitchen Retail" division was launched to sell a number of trans fat-free frozen entrees through Target, Publix, Safeway, Amazon, and other outlets. Later, this division was renamed "Luvo Inc." after being bought by its current CEO, former Lululemon CEO Christine Day.

In May 2014, restaurant developer Carlisle Corp. made a large, undisclosed investment in LYFE Kitchen and prompted the relocation of its company's headquarters from Chicago to Memphis. It was also announced that Chance Carlisle was to succeed Mike Roberts as LYFE's chief executive officer. While, Roberts still holds a place as a member of LYFE's board.

The first LYFE Kitchen in Memphis opened in 2015 and was the first LYFE Kitchen to have a bar. In 2016, another LYFE Kitchen opened in Memphis on South Main. However, in 2018, Gail Taggert, co-founder of L3 Hospitality, announced that Carlisle Corp. would be selling LYFE Kitchen brand back to the LYFE Kitchen franchisee based out of Chicago. The decision was made based upon Carlisle Corp. refocusing its efforts on its current Wendy's restaurants and the desire to go from 74 locations to 152 across the southeastern United States in the next couple years. In addition, they are one of the developers working on the One Beale project in downtown Memphis which seeks to transform the Memphis riverfront.

In a statement, CEO Chance Carlisle stated: "LYFE Kitchen was a fantastic brand that looks to change how we perceive ‘healthy food’. Unfortunately, as we aligned our strategic priorities, we did not have the time or resources necessary to fulfill LYFE’s potential and felt a divestiture made sense of all parties. We have our plate full with the start of One Beale and the continued opportunistic growth of our Wendy’s business as we continue to evaluate expansion options."

Currently, there is only one LYFE Kitchen open and it is located in Chicago, Illinois.

=== Food Sourcing and Preparation ===
Since its conception, LYFE Kitchen has made local sourcing and sustainability a major focus of its business. Its overall mission statement states, "Great food can do amazing things. It can make you feel better. It can support local farms. Promote sustainability. Reward environmentally sound businesses. Give back to the community." LYFE uses all grass-fed beef, free-range chicken, and sustainable raised seafood and claims to source its ingredients locally whenever possible. The chain also uses Gardein foods, which contain meat-free proteins, on some of their salads and pizzas.

All of LYFE Kitchen's items are prepared in-store and LYFE utilizes computerized ordering, cooking, and delivery systems to increase efficiency without using pre-prepared ingredients. Customer orders are entered into a software program which divides the meal into separate elements that are sent to different stations according to their relative cooking times. A plater assembles the finished product from their stations and serves it to the customer who has a GPS-tracking coaster. The activity is all tracked in real time.

== Store Design ==
LYFE Kitchen reflects its sustainable "lyfestyle" branding through its store design. According to co-founder Mike Roberts, "In addition to offering great-tasting, good-for-you food, we believe that LYFE Kitchen will also serve as a place where guests feel good about the sustainability measures taken to ensure an environmental stewardship". Design consultant Margee Drews incorporated many "green" elements into interior store design, including sofas made from recycled milk containers, bamboo floors, countertops made from recycled glass, and energy-efficient fixtures. In addition, all the stores feature an interior herb wall designed and planted by Plant Manager Maureen Roberts, the wife of co-founder Mike Roberts.

LYFE Kitchen staff members are outfitted with uniforms made of eco-friendly canvas and cotton. In place of disposable cups, plates, and utensils, the restaurant serves food on china. LYFE Kitchen operations maintain efficiency standards in their restaurants for electricity, water, food waste, air quality, and recycling. For their efforts, they have been certified by the United States Green Building Council, the International WELL Building Institute, and LEED.

== Social Responsibility ==
Besides its local sourcing methods, LYFE Kitchen is involved in many community and environmental outreach programs. One of its larger initiatives is working with and maintaining the standards of the Global Animal Partnership, a nonprofit organization that connects restaurants, retailers, farmers, and scientists to promote the welfare of animals in agriculture. In addition, each LYFE Kitchen restaurant is involved in local charities in their area and do works such as building local parks or donating meals to food programs in the area.
