= List of New York Giants starting quarterbacks =

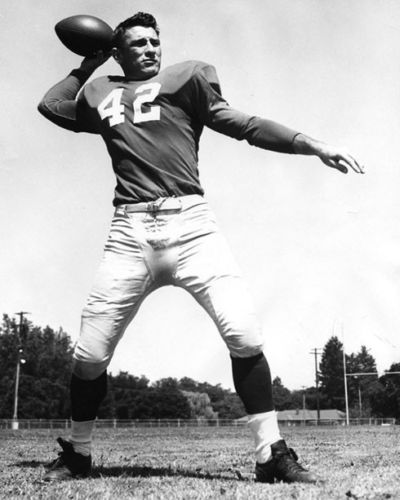
Charlie Conerly (1950–1961)

These quarterbacks have started at least one game for the New York Giants of the National Football League (NFL).

The early era of the NFL and American football in general was not conducive to passing the football, with the forward pass not being legalized until the early 1900s and not fully adopted for many more years. Although the quarterback position has historically been the one to receive the snap and thus handle the football on every offensive play, the importance of the position during this era was limited by various rules, like having to be five yards behind the line of scrimmage before a forward pass could be attempted. These rules and the tactical focus on rushing the ball limited the importance of the quarterback position while enhancing the value of different types of backs, such as the halfback and the fullback. Some of these backs were considered triple-threat men, capable of rushing, passing or kicking the football, making it common for multiple players to attempt a pass during a game.

As rules changed and the NFL began adopting a more pass-centric approach to offensive football, the importance of the quarterback position grew. Beginning in 1950, total wins and losses by a team's starting quarterback were tracked. Prior to 1950, the Giants had numerous players identified as playing the quarterback position. However, the combination of unreliable statistics in the early era of the NFL and the differences in the early quarterback position make tracking starts by quarterbacks impractical for this timeframe.

== Regular season ==
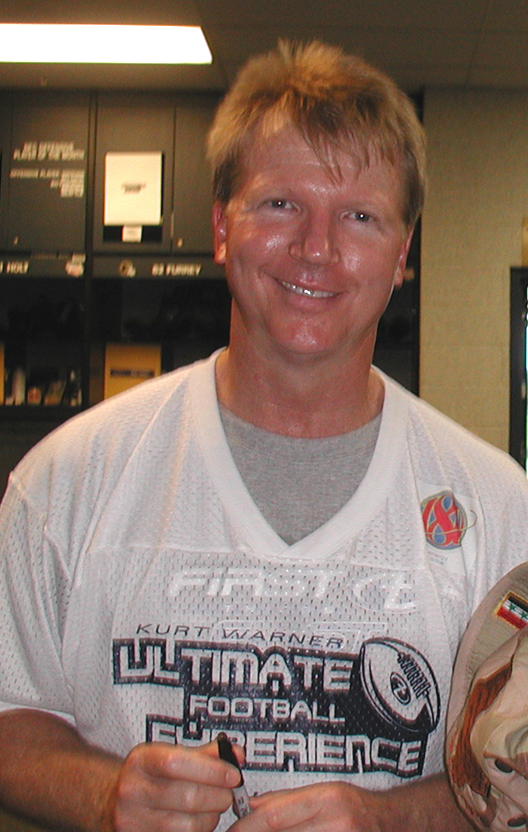
Phil Simms (1979–1981, 1984–1993)

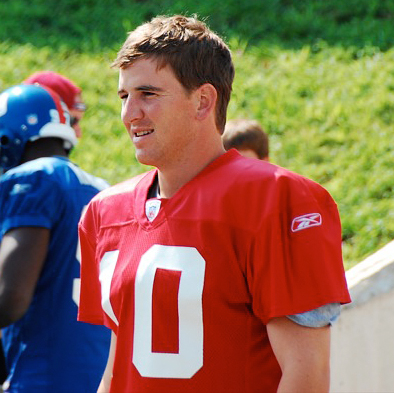
Eli Manning (2004–2019)

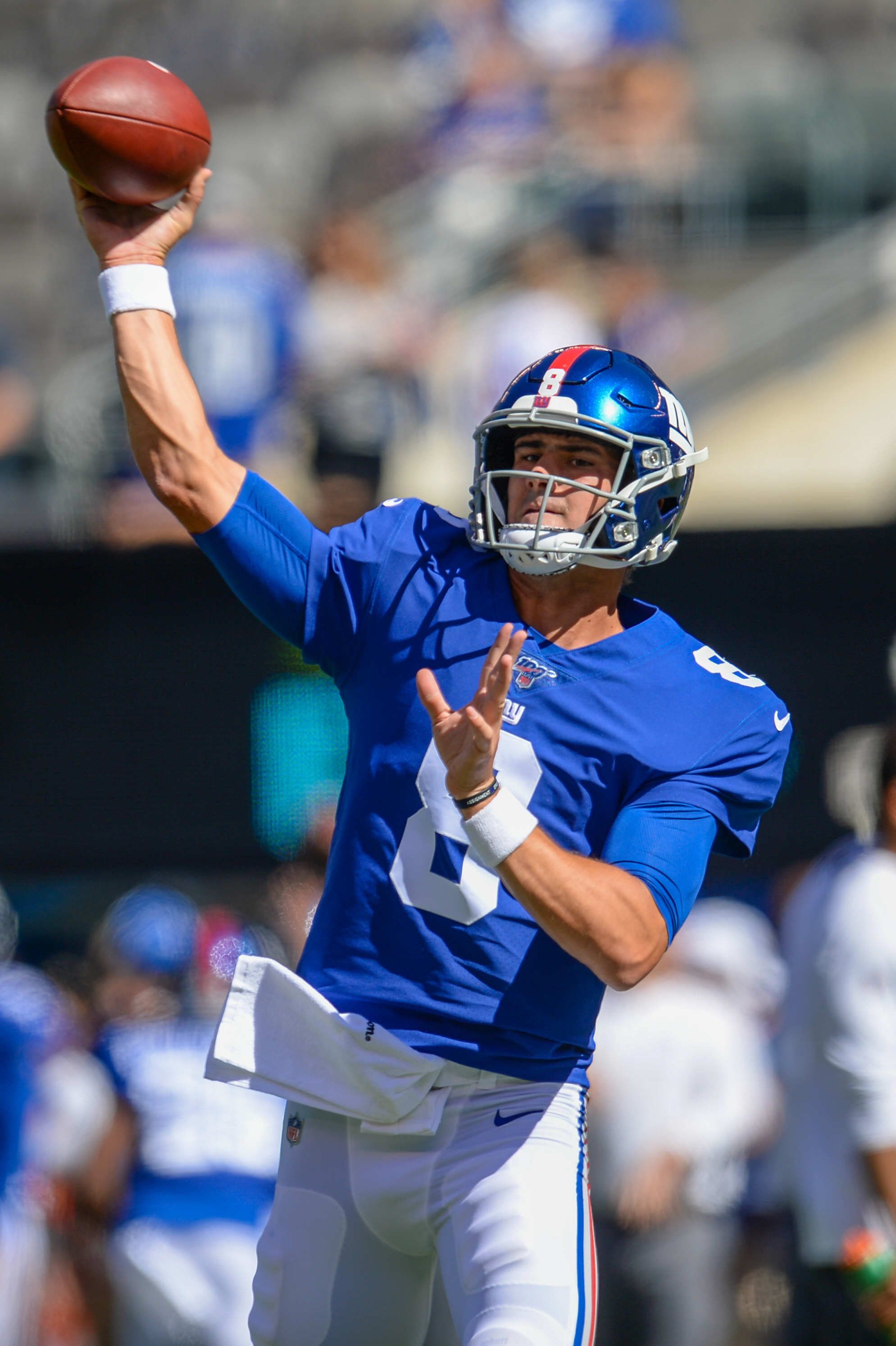
Daniel Jones (2019–2024)

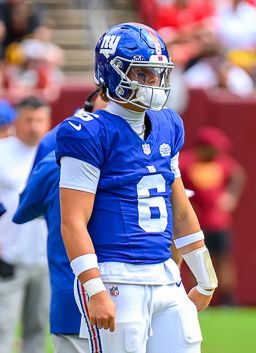
Jaxson Dart (2025–present)

The number of games they started during the season is listed to the right:

Season	Quarterback(s)
1950	Charlie Conerly (8) / Travis Tidwell (4)
1951	Charlie Conerly (11) / Travis Tidwell (1)
1952	Charlie Conerly (11) / Tom Landry (1)
1953	Charlie Conerly (11) / Arnie Galiffa (1)
1954	Charlie Conerly (10) / Bob Clatterbuck (2)
1955	Don Heinrich (7) / Charlie Conerly (5)
1956	Don Heinrich (12)
1957	Charlie Conerly (8) / Don Heinrich (4)
1958	Charlie Conerly (6) / Don Heinrich (6)
1959	Charlie Conerly (10) / George Shaw (1) / Don Heinrich (1)
1960	Charlie Conerly (8) / George Shaw (4)
1961	Y. A. Tittle (10) / Charlie Conerly (4)
1962	Y. A. Tittle (14)
1963	Y. A. Tittle (14)
1964	Y. A. Tittle (11) / Gary Wood (3)
1965	Earl Morrall (14)
1966	Earl Morrall (7) / Gary Wood (6) / Tom Kennedy (1)
1967	Fran Tarkenton (14)
1968	Fran Tarkenton (14)
1969	Fran Tarkenton (14)
1970	Fran Tarkenton (14)
1971	Fran Tarkenton (13) / Randy Johnson (1)
1972	Norm Snead (13) / Randy Johnson (1)
1973	Norm Snead (8) / Randy Johnson (6)
1974	Craig Morton (8) / Norm Snead (5) / Jim Del Gaizo (1)
1975	Craig Morton (14)
1976	Craig Morton (12) / Norm Snead (2)
1977	Joe Pisarcik (11) / Jerry Golsteyn (3)
1978	Joe Pisarcik (12) / Jerry Golsteyn (2) / Randy Dean (2)
1979	Phil Simms (11) / Joe Pisarcik (4) / Randy Dean (1)
1980	Phil Simms (13) / Scott Brunner (3)
1981	Phil Simms (10) / Scott Brunner (6)
1982	Scott Brunner (9)^{[a]}
1983	Scott Brunner (12) / Jeff Rutledge (4)
1984	Phil Simms (16)
1985	Phil Simms (16)
1986	Phil Simms (16)
1987	Phil Simms (9) / Jeff Rutledge (4) / Mike Busch (1) / Jim Crocicchia (1)
1988	Phil Simms (15) / Jeff Hostetler (1)
1989	Phil Simms (15) / Jeff Hostetler (1)
1990	Phil Simms (14) / Jeff Hostetler (2)
1991	Jeff Hostetler (12) / Phil Simms (4)
1992	Jeff Hostetler (9) / Phil Simms (4) / Kent Graham (3)
1993	Phil Simms (16)
1994	Dave Brown (15) / Kent Graham (1)
1995	Dave Brown (16)
1996	Dave Brown (16)
1997	Danny Kanell (10) / Dave Brown (6)
1998	Danny Kanell (10) / Kent Graham (6)
1999	Kent Graham (9) / Kerry Collins (7)
2000	Kerry Collins (16)
2001	Kerry Collins (16)
2002	Kerry Collins (16)
2003	Kerry Collins (13) / Jesse Palmer (3)
2004	Kurt Warner (9) / Eli Manning (7)
2005	Eli Manning (16)
2006	Eli Manning (16)
2007	Eli Manning (16)
2008	Eli Manning (16)
2009	Eli Manning (16)
2010	Eli Manning (16)
2011	Eli Manning (16)
2012	Eli Manning (16)
2013	Eli Manning (16)
2014	Eli Manning (16)
2015	Eli Manning (16)
2016	Eli Manning (16)
2017	Eli Manning (15) / Geno Smith (1)
2018	Eli Manning (16)
2019	Daniel Jones (12) / Eli Manning (4)
2020	Daniel Jones (14) / Colt McCoy (2)
2021	Daniel Jones (11) / Mike Glennon (4) / Jake Fromm (2)
2022	Daniel Jones (16) / Davis Webb (1)
2023	Daniel Jones (6) / Tommy DeVito (6) / Tyrod Taylor (5)
2024	Daniel Jones (10) / Drew Lock (5) / Tommy DeVito (2)
2025	Jaxson Dart (12) / Russell Wilson (3) / Jameis Winston (2)
2026	Jameis Winston (4) / Jaxson Dart (2) / J. J. McCarthy (2)

Notes:

^{a} Due to the 1982 Players' strike, only nine games were played in the 1982 season.

== Postseason ==
Season(s)	Quarterback(s)
1950	Charlie Conerly (0–1)
1956	Don Heinrich (1–0)
1958	Don Heinrich (1–1)
1959	Charlie Conerly (0–1)
1961	Y. A. Tittle (0–1)
1962	Y. A. Tittle (0–1)
1963	Y. A. Tittle (0–1)
1981	Scott Brunner (1–1)
1984	Phil Simms (1–1)
1985	Phil Simms (1–1)
1986	Phil Simms (3–0)
1989	Phil Simms (0–1)
1990	Jeff Hostetler (3–0)
1993	Phil Simms (1–1)
1997	Danny Kanell (0–1)
2000	Kerry Collins (2–1)
2002	Kerry Collins (0–1)
2005	Eli Manning (0–1)
2006	Eli Manning (0–1)
2007	Eli Manning (4–0)
2008	Eli Manning (0–1)
2011	Eli Manning (4–0)
2016	Eli Manning (0–1)
2022	Daniel Jones (1−1)

- * - Prior to 1933, the NFL Championship was won by the team with the best win–loss record in the regular season.

== Team career passing records ==
(Through the 2024 NFL Season)

Name	Comp	Att	%	Yds	TD	Int
Eli Manning	4,895	8,119	60.3	57,023	366	244
Phil Simms	2,576	4,647	55.4	33,462	199	157
Kerry Collins	1,447	2,473	58.5	16,875	81	70
Daniel Jones	1,437	2,241	64.1	14,618	70	47
Charlie Conerly	1,418	2,833	50.1	19,488	173	167
Fran Tarkenton	1,051	1,898	55.4	13,905	103	72
Y. A. Tittle	731	1,308	55.9	10,439	96	68

== See also ==
- Lists of NFL starting quarterbacks
