= List of Tennessee Titans starting quarterbacks =

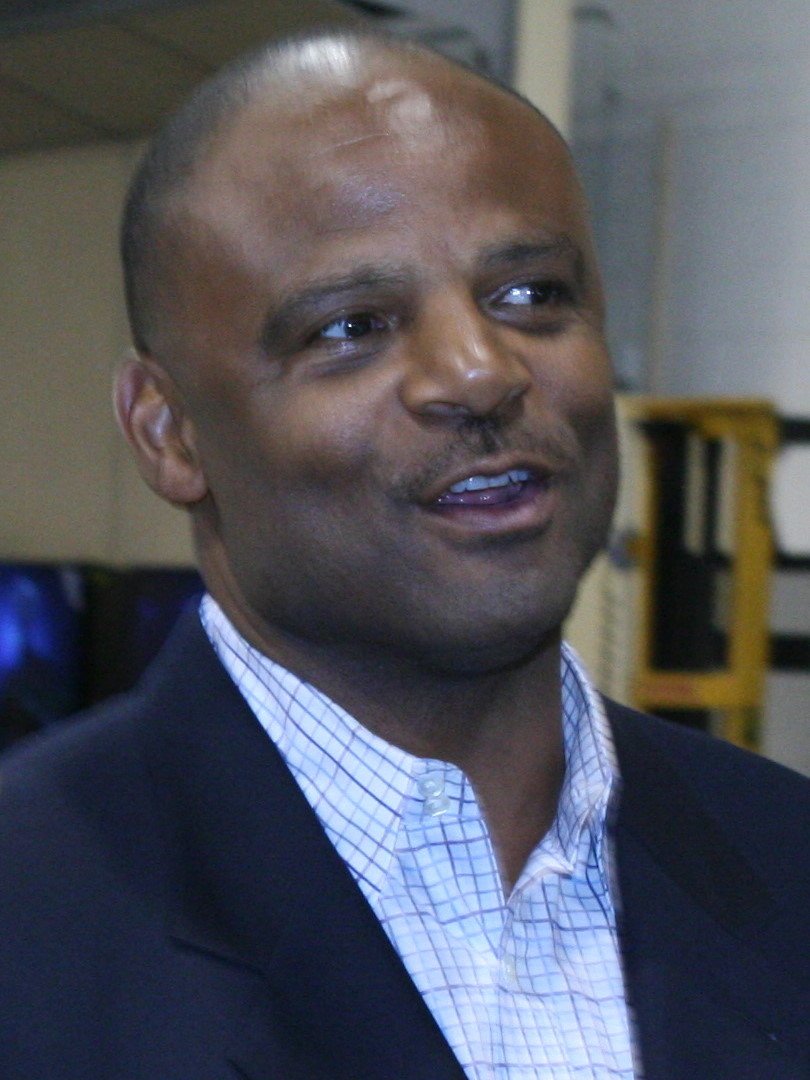
Warren Moon (1984–1993)

These quarterbacks have started at least one game for the Tennessee Titans of the National Football League (NFL). The Titans were the Houston Oilers from 1960 to 1996 and the Tennessee Oilers from 1997 to 1998.

== Starting quarterbacks ==
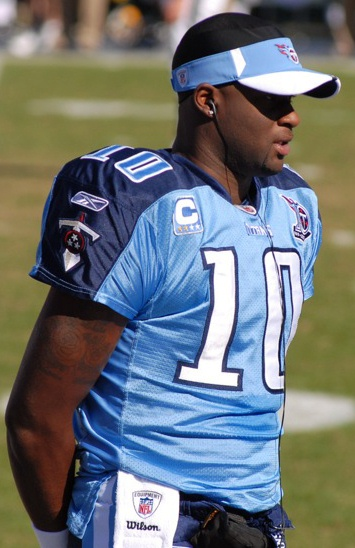
Vince Young (2006–2010)

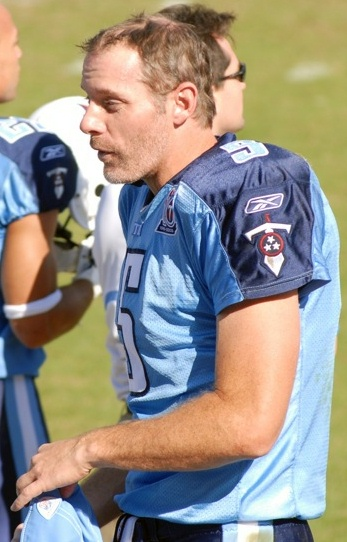
Kerry Collins (2006–2010)

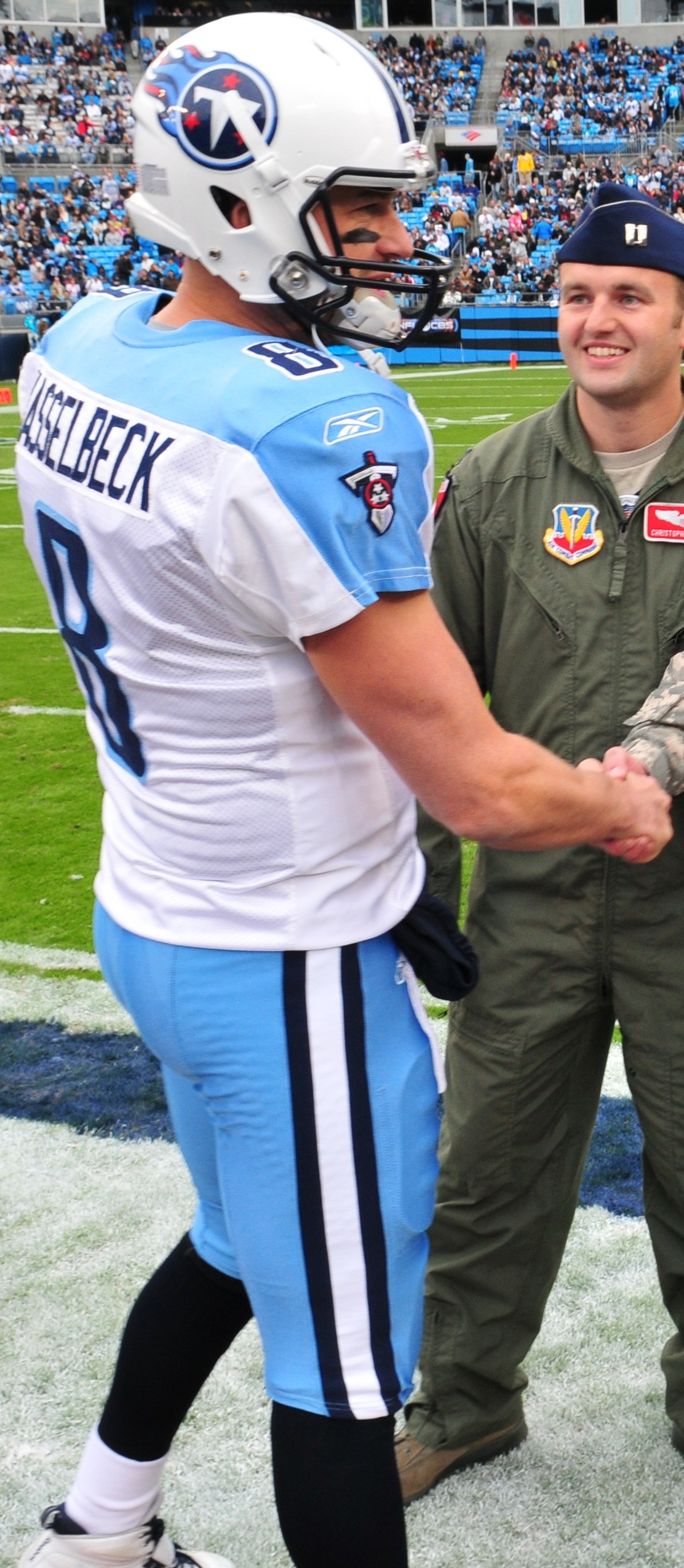
Matt Hasselbeck (2011–2012)

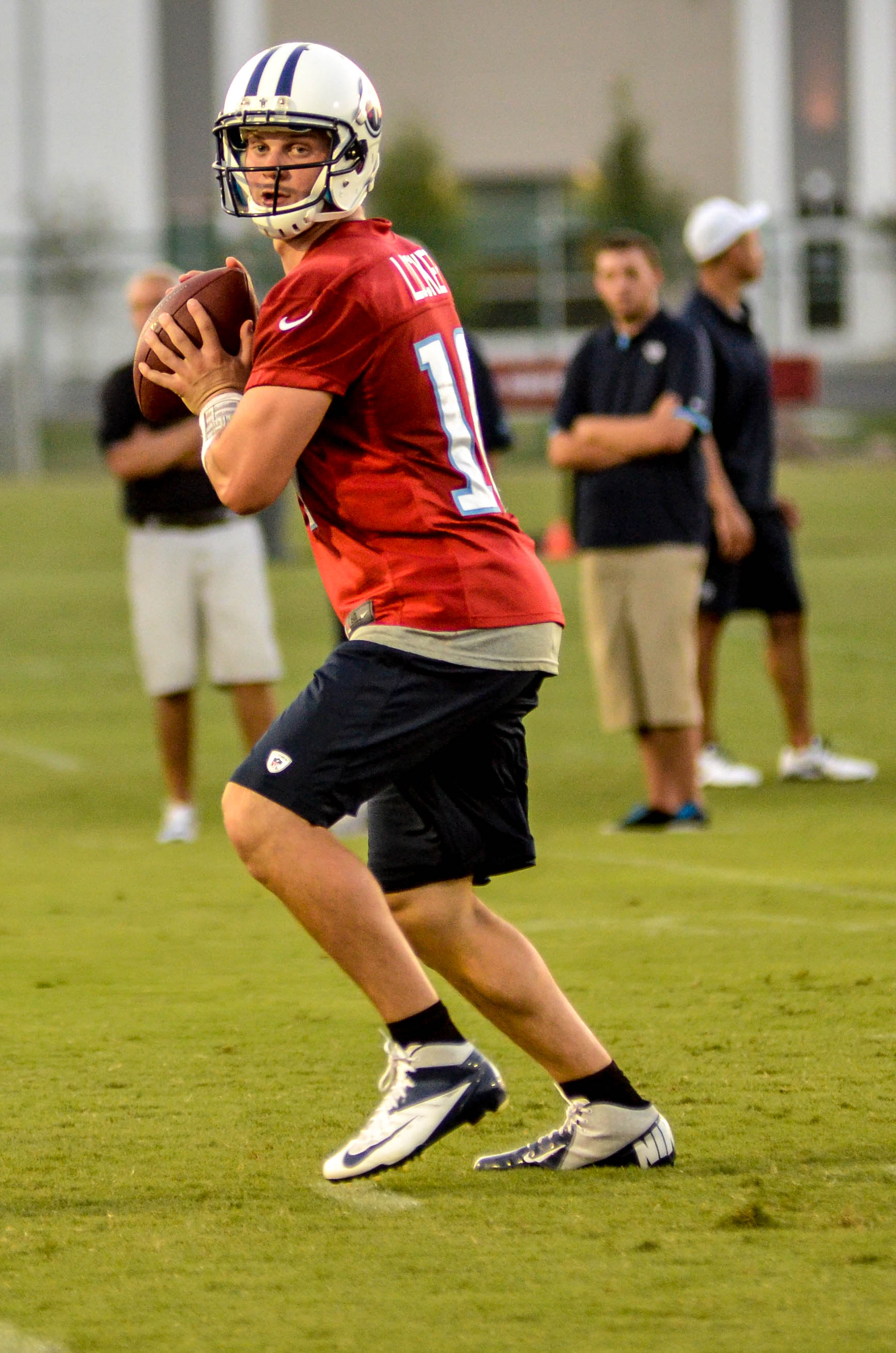
Jake Locker (2012–2014)

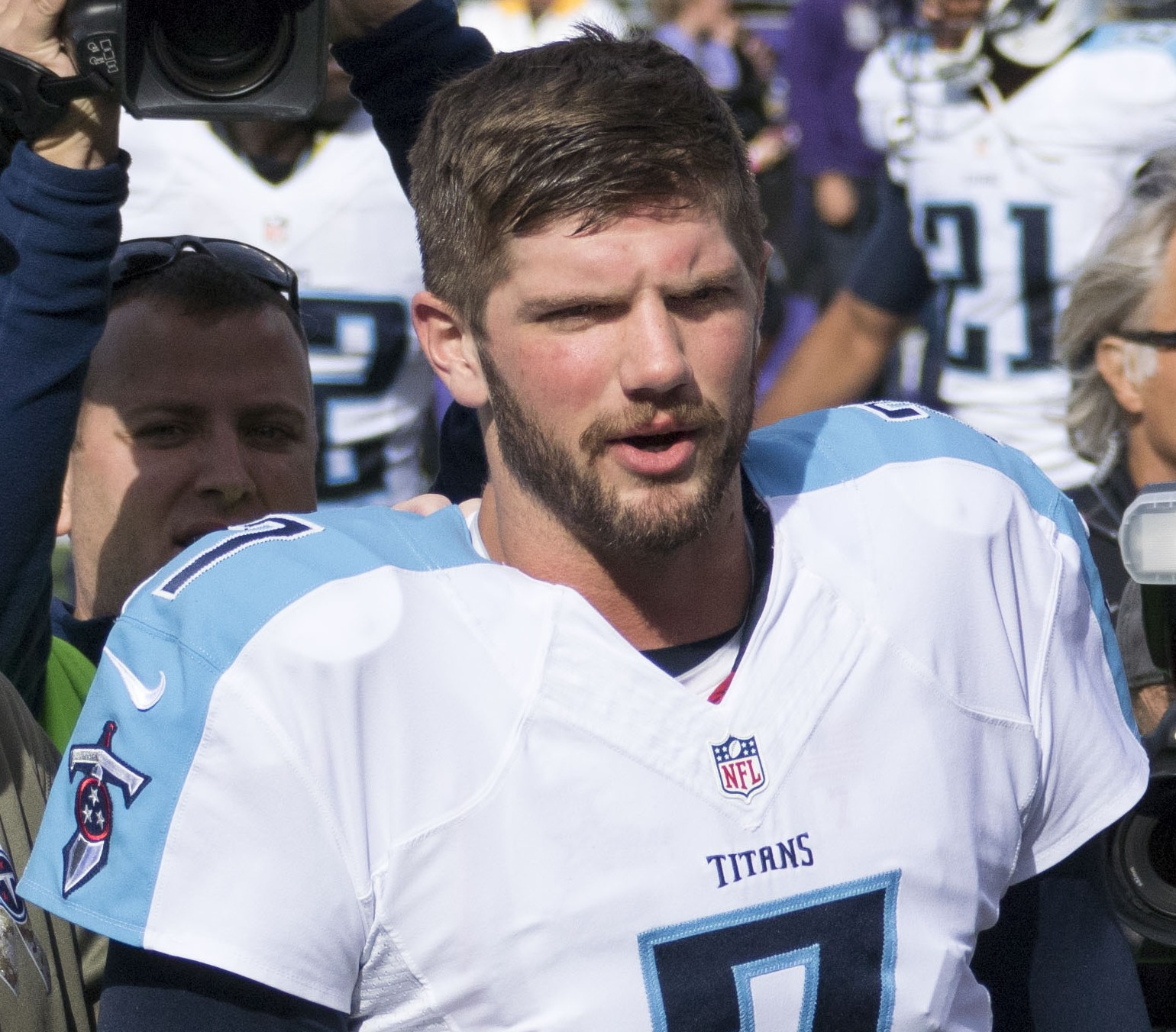
Zach Mettenberger (2014–2015)

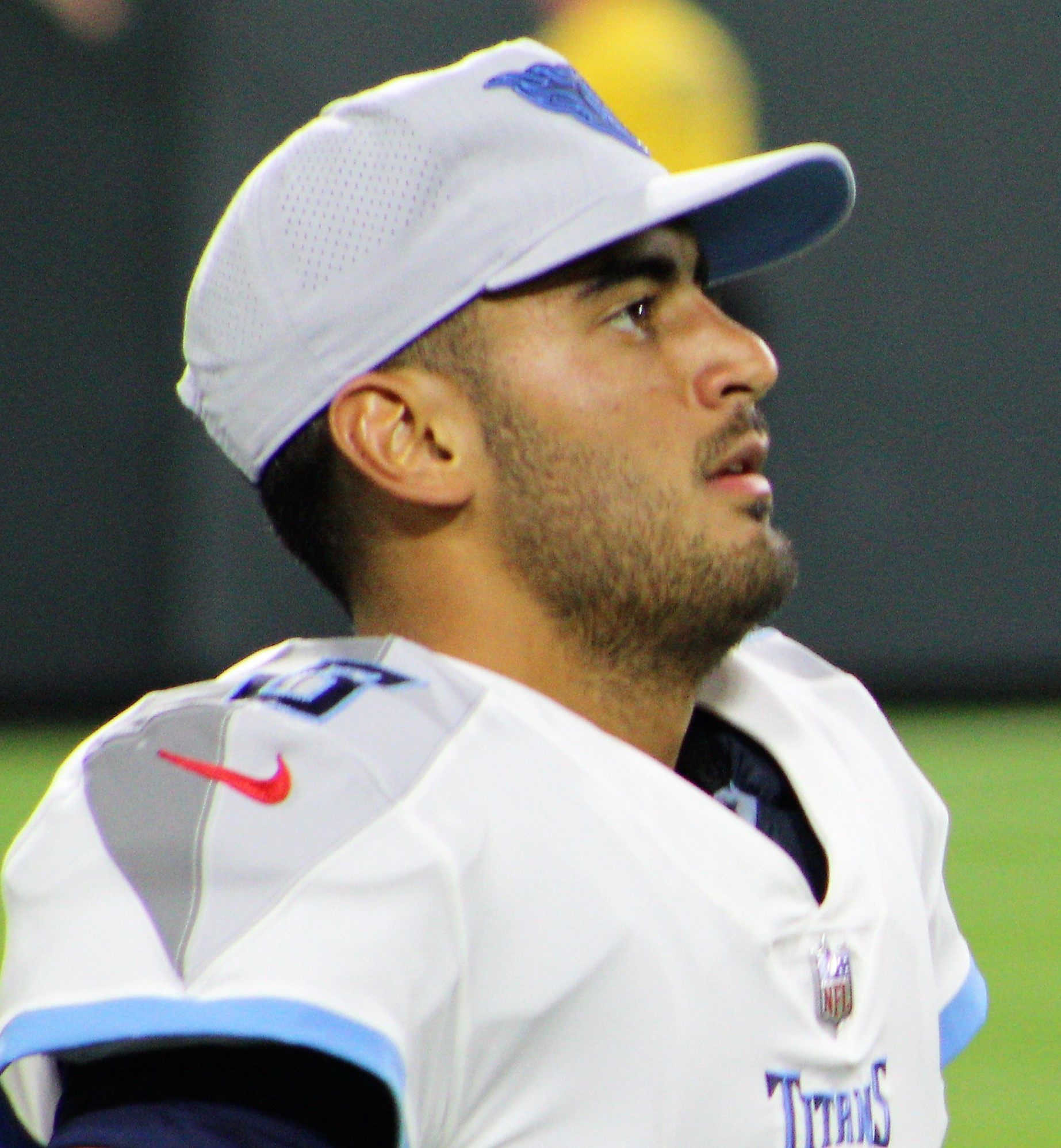
Marcus Mariota (2015–2019)

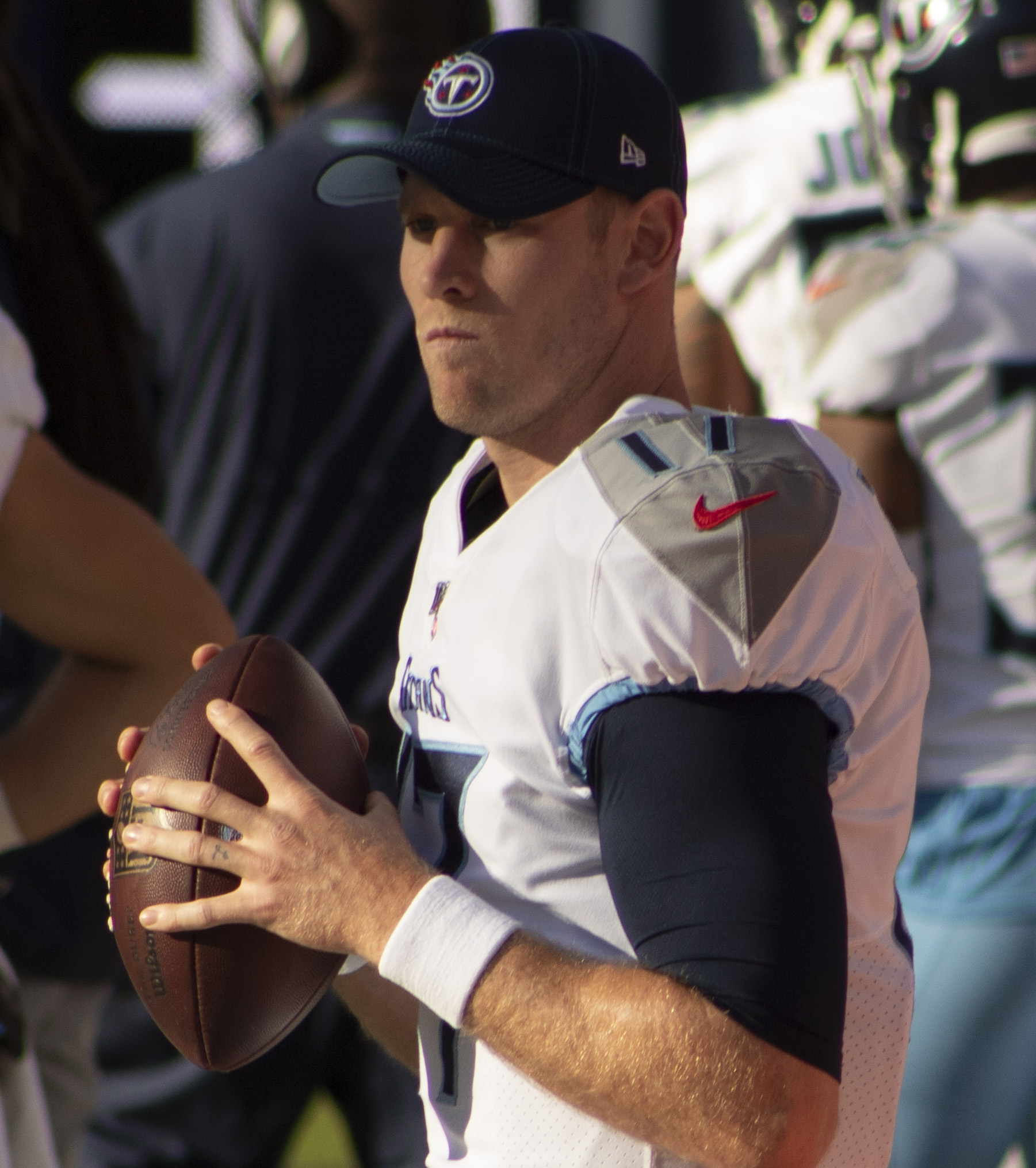
Ryan Tannehill (2019–2023)

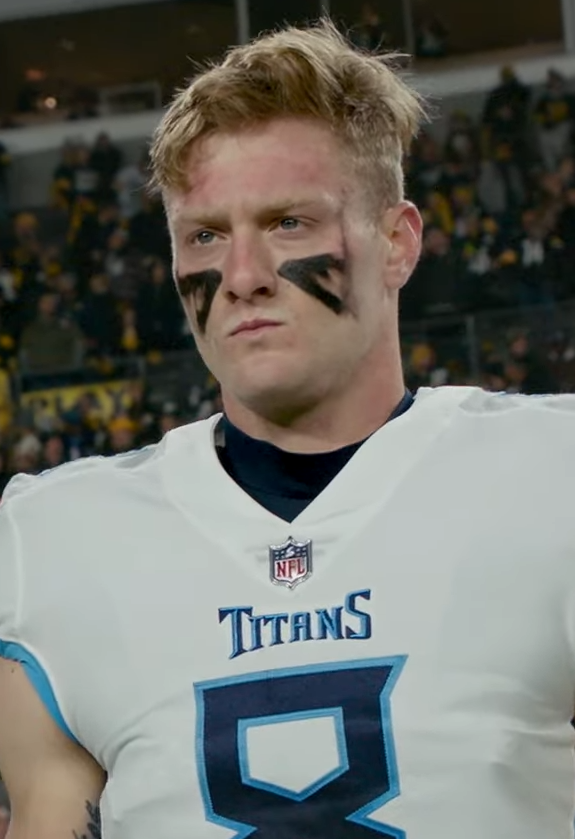
Will Levis (2023–2024)

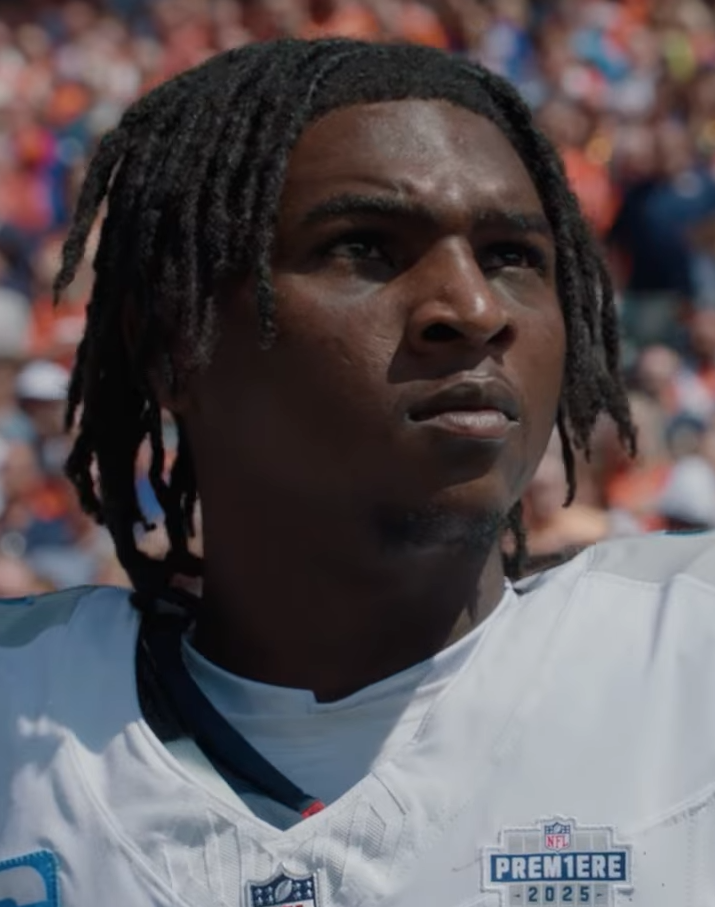
Cam Ward (2025–present)

The players are listed in order of the date of each one's first start at quarterback for the Titans. The number of games they started during the season is listed to the right:

=== Regular season ===
Season(s)	Quarterback(s)
Houston Oilers 1960–1996
1960 (AFL)	George Blanda (11) / Jacky Lee (3)
1961 (AFL)	George Blanda (11) / Jacky Lee (3)
1962 (AFL)	George Blanda (14)
1963 (AFL)	George Blanda (13) / Jacky Lee (1)
1964 (AFL)	George Blanda (13) / Don Trull (1)
1965 (AFL)	George Blanda (12) / Don Trull (2)
1966 (AFL)	George Blanda (8) / Don Trull (5) / Buddy Humphrey (1)
1967 (AFL)	Pete Beathard (9) / Jacky Lee (3) / Bob Davis (2)
1968 (AFL)	Pete Beathard (7) / Don Trull (4) / Bob Davis (3)
1969 (AFL)	Pete Beathard (10) / Don Trull (3) / Bob Davis (1)
1970	Charley Johnson (10) / Jerry Rhome (4)
1971	Dan Pastorini (8) / Charley Johnson (4) / Lynn Dickey (2)
1972	Dan Pastorini (12) / Kent Nix (2)
1973	Dan Pastorini (10) / Lynn Dickey (4)
1974	Dan Pastorini (10) / Lynn Dickey (4)
1975	Dan Pastorini (14)
1976	Dan Pastorini (10) / John Hadl (4)
1977	Dan Pastorini (12) / John Hadl (2)
1978	Dan Pastorini (16)
1979	Dan Pastorini (15) / Gifford Nielsen (1)
1980	Ken Stabler (16)
1981	Ken Stabler (12) / Gifford Nielsen (2) / John Reaves (2)
1982	Archie Manning (5) / Gifford Nielsen (4)
1983	Gifford Nielsen (7) / Oliver Luck (6) / Archie Manning (3)
1984	Warren Moon (16)
1985	Warren Moon (14) / Oliver Luck (2)
1986	Warren Moon (15) / Oliver Luck (1)
1987	Warren Moon (12) / Brent Pease (3)
1988	Warren Moon (11) / Cody Carlson (5)
1989	Warren Moon (16)
1990	Warren Moon (15) / Cody Carlson (1)
1991	Warren Moon (16)
1992	Warren Moon (10) / Cody Carlson (6)
1993	Warren Moon (14) / Cody Carlson (2)
1994	Billy Joe Tolliver (7) / Cody Carlson (5) / Bucky Richardson (4)
1995	Chris Chandler (13) / Steve McNair (2) / Will Furrer (1)
1996	Chris Chandler (12) / Steve McNair (4)
Tennessee Oilers 1997–1998
1997	Steve McNair (16)
1998	Steve McNair (16)
Tennessee Titans 1999–present
1999	Steve McNair (11) / Neil O'Donnell (5)
2000	Steve McNair (15) / Neil O'Donnell (1)
2001	Steve McNair (15) / Neil O'Donnell (1)
2002	Steve McNair (16)
2003	Steve McNair (14) / Billy Volek (1) / Neil O'Donnell (1)
2004	Steve McNair (8) / Billy Volek (8)
2005	Steve McNair (14) / Billy Volek (1) / Matt Mauck (1)
2006	Vince Young (13) / Kerry Collins (3)
2007	Vince Young (15) / Kerry Collins (1)
2008	Kerry Collins (15) / Vince Young (1)
2009	Vince Young (10) / Kerry Collins (6)
2010	Vince Young (8) / Kerry Collins (7) / Rusty Smith (1)
2011	Matt Hasselbeck (16)
2012	Jake Locker (11) / Matt Hasselbeck (5)
2013	Ryan Fitzpatrick (9) / Jake Locker (7)
2014	Zach Mettenberger (6) / Jake Locker (5) / Charlie Whitehurst (5)
2015	Marcus Mariota (12) / Zach Mettenberger (4)
2016	Marcus Mariota (15) / Matt Cassel (1)
2017	Marcus Mariota (15) / Matt Cassel (1)
2018	Marcus Mariota (13) / Blaine Gabbert (3)
2019	Ryan Tannehill (10) / Marcus Mariota (6)
2020	Ryan Tannehill (16)
2021	Ryan Tannehill (17)
2022	Ryan Tannehill (12) / Malik Willis (3) / Joshua Dobbs (2)
2023	Will Levis (9) / Ryan Tannehill (8)
2024	Will Levis (12) / Mason Rudolph (5)
2025	Cam Ward (17)
2026	Cam Ward (7)

=== Postseason ===
Season	Quarterback(s)
1960 (AFL)	George Blanda (1–0)
1961 (AFL)	George Blanda (1–0)
1962 (AFL)	George Blanda (0–1)
1967 (AFL)	Pete Beathard (0–1)
1969 (AFL)	Pete Beathard (0–1)
1978	Dan Pastorini (2–1)
1979	Gifford Nielsen (1–0)
1979	Dan Pastorini (1–1)
1980	Ken Stabler (0–1)
1987	Warren Moon (1–1)
1988	Warren Moon (1–1)
1989	Warren Moon (0–1)
1990	Cody Carlson (0–1)
1991	Warren Moon (1–1)
1992	Warren Moon (0–1)
1993	Warren Moon (0–1)
1999	Steve McNair (3–1)
2000	Steve McNair (0–1)
2002	Steve McNair (1–1)
2003	Steve McNair (1–1)
2007	Vince Young (0–1)
2008	Kerry Collins (0–1)
2017	Marcus Mariota (1–1)
2019	Ryan Tannehill (2–1)
2020	Ryan Tannehill (0–1)
2021	Ryan Tannehill (0–1)

== Most games as starting quarterback ==
These quarterbacks have at least 40 starts for the Oilers/Titans in regular season games.

Name	
GP	Games played
GS	Games started
W	Number of wins as starting quarterback
L	Number of losses as starting quarterback
T	Number of ties as starting quarterback
Pct	Winning percentage as starting quarterback

Name	Period	GP	GS	W	L	T	%
Warren Moon	1984–1993	141	139	70	69	—	.504
Steve McNair	1995–2005	139	131	76	55	—	.580
Dan Pastorini	1971–1979	125	107	53	54	—	.495
George Blanda	1960–1966	98	82	44	38	—	.537
Ryan Tannehill	2019–2023	67	63	39	24	—	.619
Marcus Mariota	2015–2019	63	61	29	32	—	.475
Vince Young	2006–2010	54	47	30	17	—	.638

== Team career passing records ==
These quarterbacks have over 10,000 career passing yards with the Oilers/Titans in regular season games.

Name	Comp	Att	%	Yds	TD	Int
Warren Moon	2,632	4,546	57.9	33,685	196	166
Steve McNair	2,305	3,871	59.5	27,141	156	103
Dan Pastorini	1,426	2,768	51.5	16,864	96	139
George Blanda	1,347	2,784	48.4	19,149	165	189
Ryan Tannehill	1,234	1,853	66.6	14,447	93	40
Marcus Mariota	1,110	1,764	62.9	13,183	76	44

== See also ==
- Lists of NFL starting quarterbacks
