= List of current NFL starting quarterbacks =

In American football, the starting quarterback is considered to be among the most important positions in sports. They are among the most high-profile athletes in North America and are typically viewed as the team's leader. The success of a National Football League (NFL) franchise often rests on the quarterback; thus, teams will go to great lengths to find a franchise quarterback to build around.

== List ==
Note: The players listed are each team's starting quarterback from their most recently played game (Week 11) and may not reflect roster changes made since that time. Because of this, quarterbacks that have been announced as replacement due to injury or otherwise are not included until they make their start.

Team	Quarterback	College	First start with team	Starter since
Arizona Cardinals (list)	Josh Johnson	San Diego	Week 11, 2026	Week 11, 2026
Atlanta Falcons (list)	Michael Penix Jr.	Washington	Week 16, 2024	Week 3, 2026
Baltimore Ravens (list)	Jacoby Brissett	NC State	Week 10, 2026	Week 10, 2026
Buffalo Bills (list)	Josh Allen	Wyoming	Week 2, 2018	Week 12, 2018
Carolina Panthers (list)	Bryce Young	Alabama	Week 1, 2023	Week 9, 2025
Chicago Bears (list)	Caleb Williams	USC	Week 1, 2024	Week 6, 2026
Cincinnati Bengals (list)	Joe Burrow	LSU	Week 1, 2020	Week 13, 2025
Cleveland Browns (list)	Deshaun Watson	Clemson	Week 13, 2022	Week 10, 2026
Dallas Cowboys (list)	Dak Prescott	Mississippi State	Week 1, 2016	Week 1, 2025
Denver Broncos (list)	Bo Nix	Oregon	Week 1, 2024	Week 1, 2026
Detroit Lions (list)	Jared Goff	California	Week 1, 2021	Week 18, 2021
Green Bay Packers (list)	Jordan Love	Utah State	Week 9, 2021	Wild Card, 2025
Houston Texans (list)	C. J. Stroud	Ohio State	Week 1, 2023	Week 13, 2025
Indianapolis Colts (list)	Anthony Richardson	Florida	Week 1, 2023	Week 12, 2026
Jacksonville Jaguars (list)	Trevor Lawrence	Clemson	Week 1, 2021	Week 1, 2025
Kansas City Chiefs (list)	Patrick Mahomes	Texas Tech	Week 17, 2017	Week 1, 2026
Las Vegas Raiders (list)	Fernando Mendoza	Indiana	Week 10, 2026	Week 10, 2026
Los Angeles Chargers (list)	Justin Herbert	Oregon	Week 2, 2020	Wild Card, 2025
Los Angeles Rams (list)	Matthew Stafford	Georgia	Week 1, 2021	Wild Card, 2024
Miami Dolphins (list)	Kyle McCord	Syracuse	Week 10, 2026	Week 10, 2026
Minnesota Vikings (list)	Kirk Cousins	Michigan State	Week 1, 2018 (Note: Cousins's first start in his first stint with the Vikings was Week 1 of the 2018 season. He was a member of the Vikings from 2018 to 2023, and again since 2026.)	Week 10, 2026
New England Patriots (list)	Drake Maye	North Carolina	Week 6, 2024	Week 6, 2024
New Orleans Saints (list)	Tyler Shough	Louisville	Week 9, 2025	Week 9, 2025
New York Giants (list)	J. J. McCarthy	Michigan	Week 7, 2026	Week 7, 2026
New York Jets (list)	Geno Smith	West Virginia	Week 1, 2026 (Note: Smith's first start in his first stint with the Jets was Week 1 of the 2013 season. He was a member of the Jets from 2013 to 2016, and again since 2026.)	Week 1, 2026
Philadelphia Eagles (list)	Joe Milton	Tennessee	Week 9, 2026	Week 9, 2026
Pittsburgh Steelers (list)	Aaron Rodgers	California	Week 1, 2025	Week 13, 2025
San Francisco 49ers (list)	Brock Purdy	Iowa State	Week 13, 2022	Week 11, 2025
Seattle Seahawks (list)	Drew Lock	Missouri	Week 2, 2026 (Note: Lock's first start in his first stint with the Seahawks was Week 14 of the 2023 season. He was a member of the Seahawks from 2022 to 2023, and again since 2025.)	Week 9, 2026
Tampa Bay Buccaneers (list)	Baker Mayfield	Oklahoma	Week 1, 2023	Week 7, 2026
Tennessee Titans (list)	Cam Ward	Miami (FL)	Week 1, 2025	Week 1, 2025
Washington Commanders (list)	Jayden Daniels	LSU	Week 1, 2024	Week 5, 2026

== Starting quarterbacks by week ==
Team	Week																	
Team	1	2	3	4	5	6	7	8	9	10	11	12	13	14	15	16	17	18
Arizona Cardinals	Brissett	Brissett	Brissett	Brissett	Brissett	Brissett	Brissett	Brissett	Minshew	Beck	Johnson							
Atlanta Falcons	Rush	Rush	Penix Jr.	Penix Jr.	Penix Jr.	Penix Jr.	Penix Jr.	Penix Jr.	Penix Jr.	Penix Jr.	Penix Jr.							
Baltimore Ravens	Jackson	Jackson	Jackson	Jackson	Huntley	Huntley	Huntley	Jackson	Fagnano	Brissett	Brissett							
Buffalo Bills	Allen	Allen	Allen	Allen	Allen	Allen	Allen	Allen	Allen	Allen	Allen							
Carolina Panthers	Young	Young	Young	Young	Young	Young	Young	Young	Young	Young	Young							
Chicago Bears	Williams	Williams	Keenum	Keenum	Bagent	Williams	Williams	Williams	Williams	Williams	Williams							
Cincinnati Bengals	Burrow	Burrow	Burrow	Burrow	Burrow	Burrow	Burrow	Burrow	Burrow	Burrow	Burrow							
Cleveland Browns	Watson	Watson	Watson	Watson	Watson	Watson	Watson	Watson	Sanders	Watson	Watson							
Dallas Cowboys	Prescott	Prescott	Prescott	Prescott	Prescott	Prescott	Prescott	Prescott	Prescott	Prescott	Prescott							
Denver Broncos	Nix	Nix	Nix	Nix	Nix	Nix	Nix	Nix	Nix	Nix	Nix							
Detroit Lions	Goff	Goff	Goff	Goff	Goff	Goff	Goff	Goff	Goff	Goff	Goff							
Green Bay Packers	Love	Love	Love	Love	Love	Love	Love	Love	Love	Love	Love							
Houston Texans	Stroud	Stroud	Stroud	Stroud	Stroud	Stroud	Stroud	Stroud	Stroud	Stroud	Stroud							
Indianapolis Colts	Jones	Jones	Jones	Jones	Jones	Jones	Jones	Jones	Jones	Jones	Jones							
Jacksonville Jaguars	Lawrence	Lawrence	Lawrence	Lawrence	Lawrence	Lawrence	Lawrence	Lawrence	Lawrence	Lawrence	Lawrence							
Kansas City Chiefs	Mahomes	Mahomes	Mahomes	Mahomes	Mahomes	Mahomes	Mahomes	Mahomes	Mahomes	Mahomes	Mahomes							
Las Vegas Raiders	Cousins	Cousins	Cousins	Cousins	Cousins	Cousins	Cousins	Cousins	Cousins	Mendoza	Mendoza							
Los Angeles Chargers	Herbert	Herbert	Herbert	Herbert	Herbert	Herbert	Herbert	Herbert	Herbert	Herbert	Herbert							
Los Angeles Rams	Stafford	Stafford	Stafford	Stafford	Stafford	Stafford	Stafford	Stafford	Stafford	Stafford	Stafford							
Miami Dolphins	Willis	Willis	Willis	Willis	Willis	Willis	Willis	Willis	Willis	McCord	McCord							
Minnesota Vikings	Murray	Wentz	Murray	Murray	Murray	Murray	Murray	Murray	Wentz	Cousins	Cousins							
New England Patriots	Maye	Maye	Maye	Maye	Maye	Maye	Maye	Maye	Maye	Maye	Devito							
New York Giants	Dart	Dart	Winston	Winston	Winston	Winston	Winston	McCarthy	McCarthy	McCarthy	McCarthy							
New York Jets	Smith	Smith	Smith	Smith	Smith	Smith	Smith	Smith	Smith	Smith	Smith							
Philadelphia Eagles	Hurts	Hurts	Hurts	Hurts	Hurts	McKee	McKee	McKee	Milton	Milton	Milton							
Pittsburgh Steelers	Rodgers	Rodgers	Rodgers	Rodgers	Rodgers	Rodgers	Rodgers	Rodgers	Rodgers	Rodgers	Rodgers							
San Francisco 49ers	Purdy	Purdy	Purdy	Purdy	Purdy	Purdy	Purdy	Purdy	Purdy	Purdy	Purdy							
Seattle Seahawks	Darnold	Lock	Darnold	Darnold	Darnold	Darnold	Darnold	Darnold	Lock	Lock	Darnold							
Tampa Bay Buccaneers	Mayfield	Mayfield	Mayfield	Jal. Daniels	Jal. Daniels	Jal. Daniels	Mayfield	Mayfield	Mayfield	Mayfield	Mayfield							
Tennessee Titans	Ward	Ward	Ward	Ward	Ward	Ward	Ward	Ward	Ward	Ward	Ward							
Washington Commanders	Jay. Daniels	Jay. Daniels	Mariota	Mariota	Jay. Daniels	Jay. Daniels	Jay. Daniels	Jay. Daniels	Jay. Daniels	Jay. Daniels	Jay. Daniels							

== See also ==
- List of most consecutive starts by an NFL quarterback
- List of NFL career quarterback wins leaders
