= List of New England Patriots starting quarterbacks =

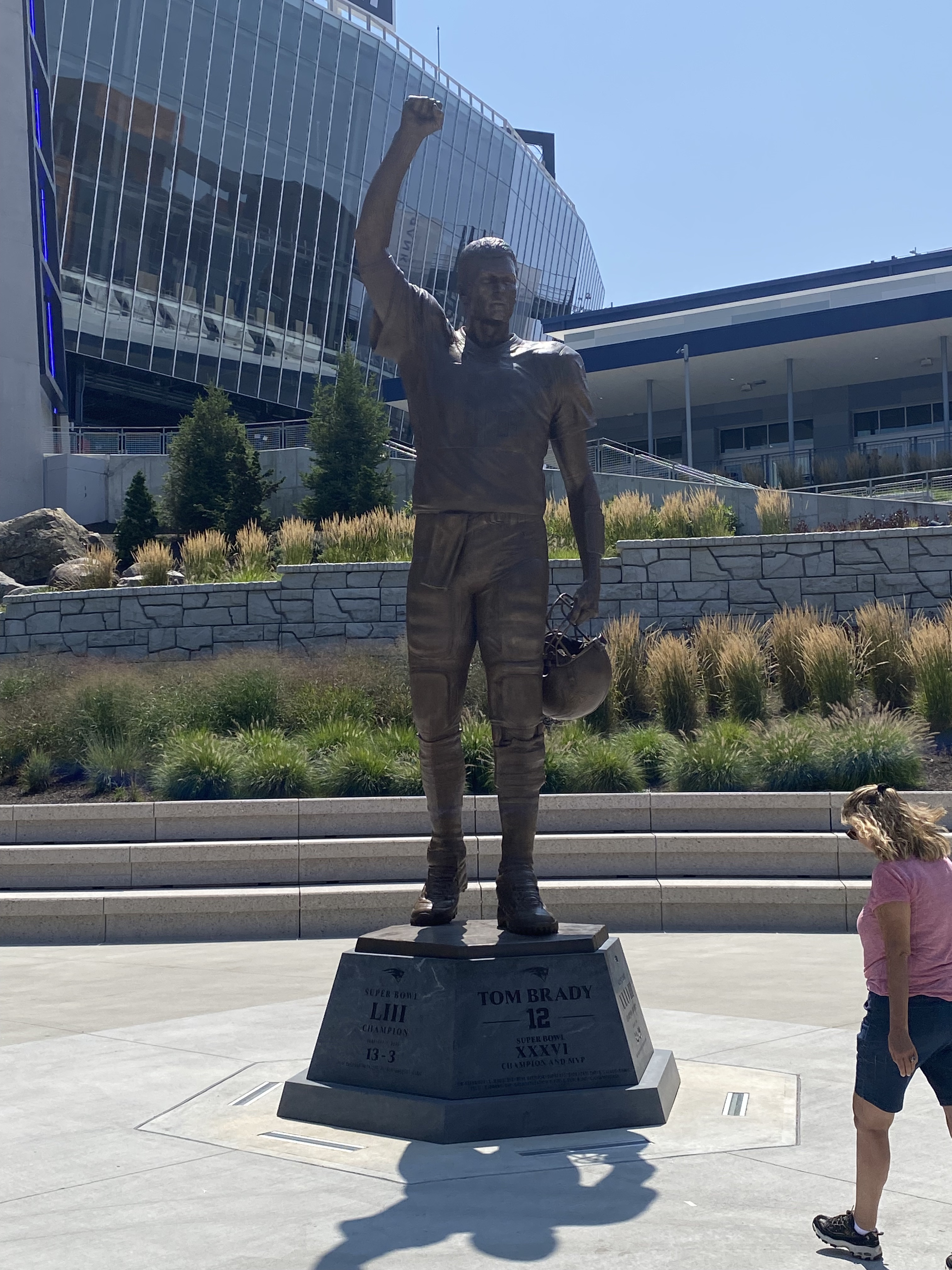
Tom Brady won a record six Super Bowls with the Patriots. Between 2000 and 2019, he started 283 regular season games and 41 postseason games for the franchise, both NFL records with a single team.

This is a list of every starting quarterback for the New England Patriots of the National Football League (NFL).

== History ==
There have been 30 starting quarterbacks for the Patriots since their founding in 1960. Babe Parilli was the franchise's first longtime starter, leading the Patriots to their only playoff berth and championship game appearance while a member of the American Football League (AFL). Following the AFL–NFL merger in 1970, Jim Plunkett was drafted by the Patriots first overall to become the starting quarterback, but an unsuccessful tenure resulted in him being traded after five seasons. Plunkett was succeeded by Steve Grogan, who served as the team's primary starter during the late 1970s and helped lead them to their first NFL playoff appearances. A series of injuries caused Grogan to lose his starting job by the 1980s, although he remained on the team until 1990.

The Patriots lacked a steady quarterback for most of the 1980s, with five (including Grogan) starting in the 1987 season. First-round selection Tony Eason, the longest-tenured of the decade, contributed to the Patriots making their Super Bowl debut, but lasted only three seasons as the primary starter. In the 1990s, first overall pick Drew Bledsoe ended the Patriots' search for a quarterback by bringing the team to consistent playoff contention after five losing seasons.

Bledsoe's success would be eclipsed the next decade when an injury caused him to be relieved by backup Tom Brady. As the franchise's longest-tenured quarterback from 2001 to 2019, Brady is credited with the Patriots dynasty that saw them set the records for Super Bowl appearances and wins. Following Brady's departure, the Patriots have alternated between multiple starting quarterbacks in the 2020s. The current starter is Drake Maye, who has held the position since his rookie season in 2024.

== Regular season ==
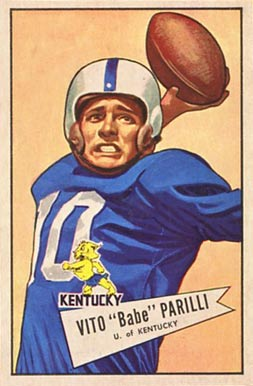
As the Patriots' primary quarterback in the AFL, Babe Parilli led them to the 1963 championship

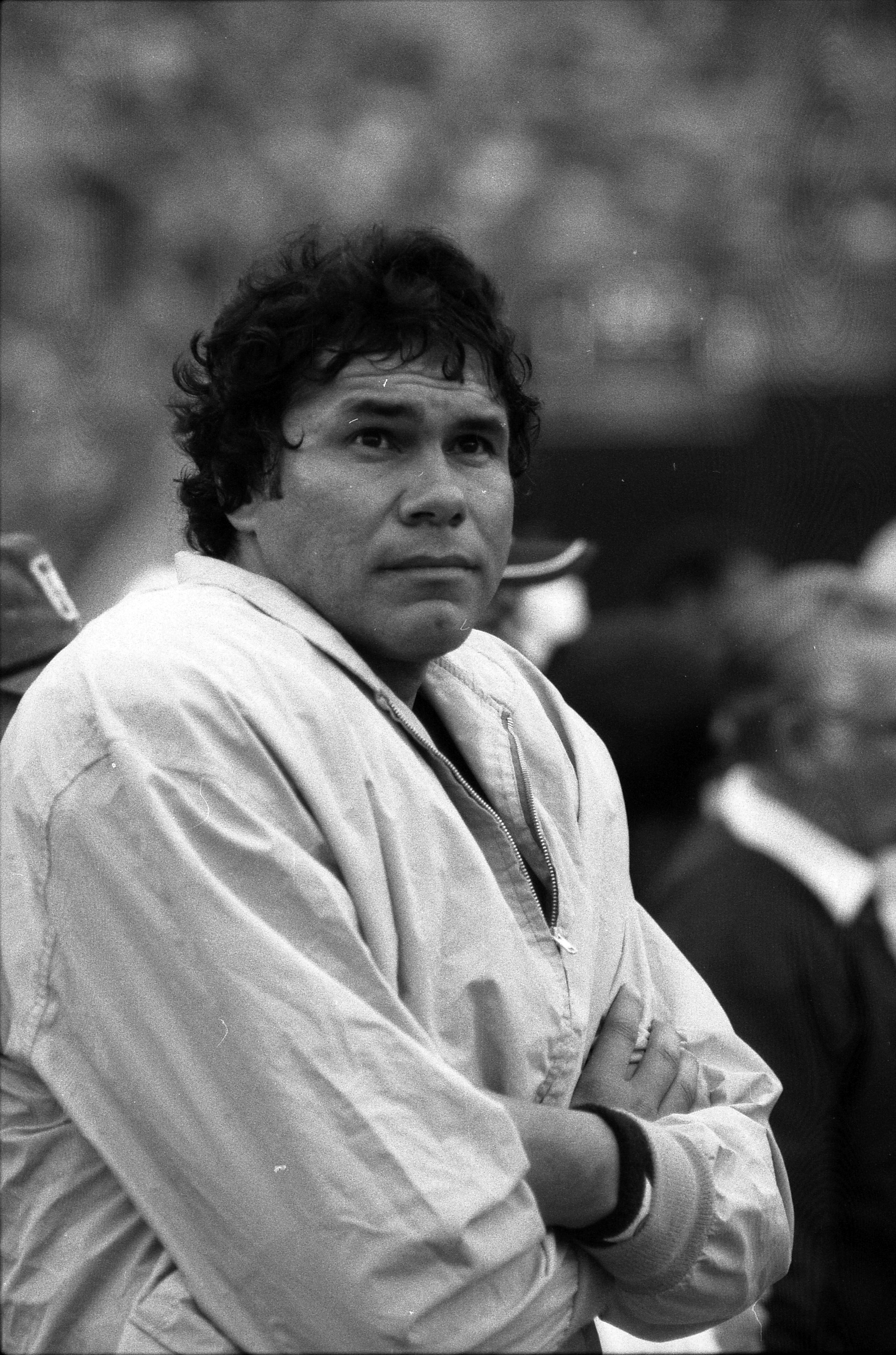
The Patriots drafted Jim Plunkett first overall in 1971, but traded him after five seasons

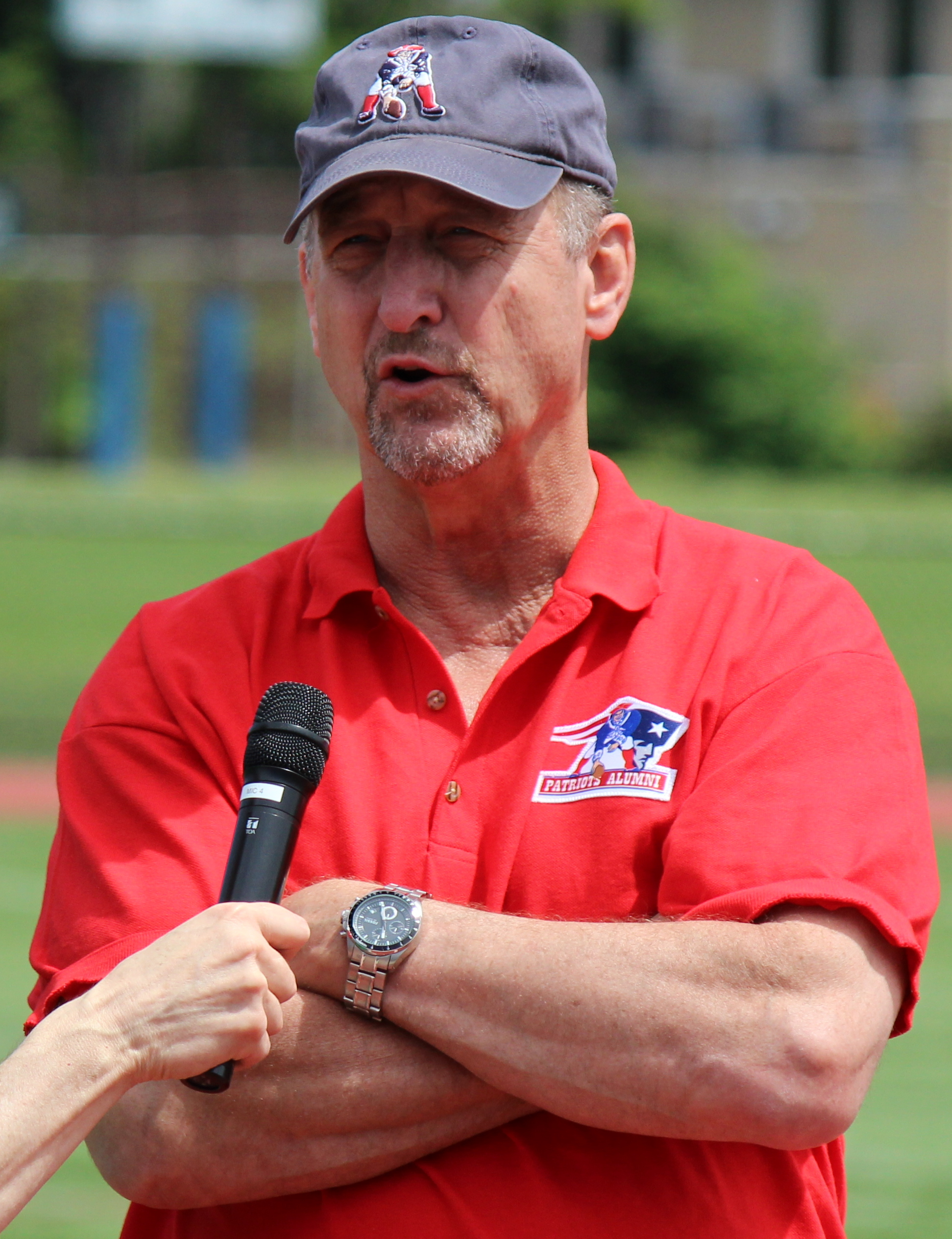
Steve Grogan set the season record for quarterback rushing touchdowns in 1976, which stood for 35 years

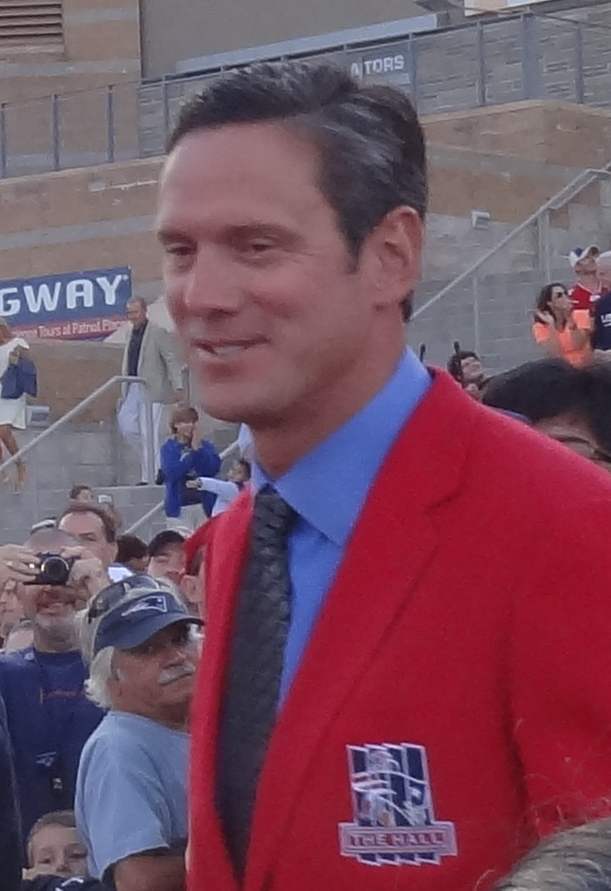
Drew Bledsoe helped transform the Patriots into playoff contenders during the 1990s

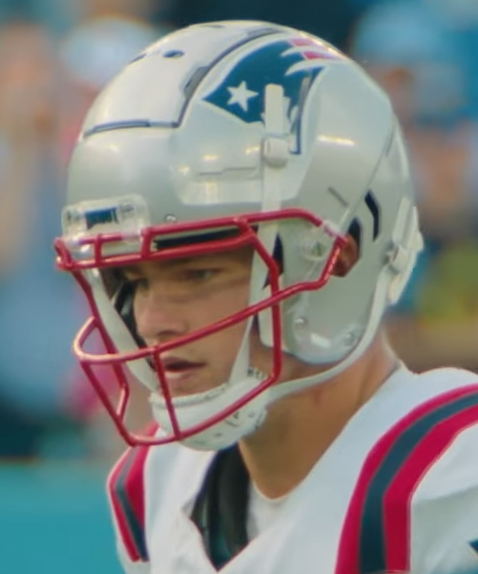
Current Patriots starting quarterback Drake Maye led the team to the Super Bowl in his second season

The number of games they started during the season is listed to the right in descending order:

Season(s)	Quarterback(s)	Ref.
Boston Patriots
1960 (AFL)	Butch Songin (12) / Tom Greene (2)	
1961 (AFL)	Babe Parilli (8) / Butch Songin (6)	
1962 (AFL)	Babe Parilli (10) / Tom Yewcic (4)	
1963 (AFL)	Babe Parilli (14)	
1964 (AFL)	Babe Parilli (14)	
1965 (AFL)	Babe Parilli (13) / Eddie Wilson (1)	
1966 (AFL)	Babe Parilli (14)	
1967 (AFL)	Babe Parilli (11) / Don Trull (3)	
1968 (AFL)	Mike Taliaferro (7) / Tom Sherman (7)	
1969 (AFL)	Mike Taliaferro (14)	
1970	Joe Kapp (10) / Mike Taliaferro (4)	
New England Patriots
1971	Jim Plunkett (14)	
1972	Jim Plunkett (14)	
1973	Jim Plunkett (14)	
1974	Jim Plunkett (14)	
1975	Steve Grogan (7) / Jim Plunkett (5) / Neil Graff (2)	
1976	Steve Grogan (14)	
1977	Steve Grogan (14)	
1978^{[a]}	Steve Grogan (16)	
1979	Steve Grogan (16)	
1980	Steve Grogan (12) / Matt Cavanaugh (4)	
1981	Matt Cavanaugh (8) / Steve Grogan (7) / Tom Owen (1)	
1982^{[b]}	Steve Grogan (6) / Matt Cavanaugh (3)	
1983	Steve Grogan (12) / Tony Eason (4)	
1984	Tony Eason (13) / Steve Grogan (3)	
1985	Tony Eason (10) / Steve Grogan (6)	
1986	Tony Eason (14) / Steve Grogan (2)	
1987^{[b]}	Steve Grogan (6) / Tom Ramsey (3) / Tony Eason (3) / Bob Bleier (2) / Doug Flutie (1)	
1988	Doug Flutie (9) / Steve Grogan (4) / Tony Eason (2) / Tom Ramsey (1)	
1989	Steve Grogan (6) / Marc Wilson (4) / Tony Eason (3) / Doug Flutie (3)	
1990	Marc Wilson (6) / Tommy Hodson (6) / Steve Grogan (4)	
1991	Hugh Millen (13) / Tommy Hodson (3)	
1992	Hugh Millen (7) / Scott Zolak (4) / Tommy Hodson (3) / Jeff Carlson (2)	
1993	Drew Bledsoe (12) / Scott Secules (4)	
1994	Drew Bledsoe (16)	
1995	Drew Bledsoe (15) / Scott Zolak (1)	
1996	Drew Bledsoe (16)	
1997	Drew Bledsoe (16)	
1998	Drew Bledsoe (14) / Scott Zolak (2)	
1999	Drew Bledsoe (16)	
2000	Drew Bledsoe (16)	
2001	Tom Brady (14) / Drew Bledsoe (2)	
2002	Tom Brady (16)	
2003	Tom Brady (16)	
2004	Tom Brady (16)	
2005	Tom Brady (16)	
2006	Tom Brady (16)	
2007	Tom Brady (16)	
2008	Matt Cassel (15) / Tom Brady (1)	
2009	Tom Brady (16)	
2010	Tom Brady (16)	
2011	Tom Brady (16)	
2012	Tom Brady (16)	
2013	Tom Brady (16)	
2014	Tom Brady (16)	
2015	Tom Brady (16)	
2016	Tom Brady (12) / Jacoby Brissett (2) / Jimmy Garoppolo (2)	
2017	Tom Brady (16)	
2018	Tom Brady (16)	
2019	Tom Brady (16)	
2020	Cam Newton (15) / Brian Hoyer (1)	
2021^{[c]}	Mac Jones (17)	
2022	Mac Jones (14) / Bailey Zappe (2) / Brian Hoyer (1)	
2023	Mac Jones (11) / Bailey Zappe (6)	
2024	Drake Maye (12) / Jacoby Brissett (5)	
2025	Drake Maye (17)	
2026	Drake Maye (10)	

== Postseason ==
Season(s)	Quarterback(s)
1963 (AFL)	Babe Parilli (1–1)
1976	Steve Grogan (0–1)
1978	Steve Grogan (0–1)
1982	Steve Grogan (0–1)
1985	Tony Eason (3–1)
1986	Tony Eason (0–1)
1994	Drew Bledsoe (0–1)
1996	Drew Bledsoe (2–1)
1997	Drew Bledsoe (1–1)
1998	Scott Zolak (0–1)
2001	Tom Brady (3–0)
2003	Tom Brady (3–0)
2004	Tom Brady (3–0)
2005	Tom Brady (1–1)
2006	Tom Brady (2–1)
2007	Tom Brady (2–1)
2009	Tom Brady (0–1)
2010	Tom Brady (0–1)
2011	Tom Brady (2–1)
2012	Tom Brady (1–1)
2013	Tom Brady (1–1)
2014	Tom Brady (3–0)
2015	Tom Brady (1–1)
2016	Tom Brady (3–0)
2017	Tom Brady (2–1)
2018	Tom Brady (3–0)
2019	Tom Brady (0–1)
2021	Mac Jones (0–1)
2025	Drake Maye (3–1)

== Most games as starting quarterback ==
These quarterbacks have at least 40 starts for the Patriots in regular season games.

GP	Games played
GS	Games started
W	Number of wins as starting quarterback
L	Number of losses as starting quarterback
T	Number of ties as starting quarterback
%	Winning percentage as starting quarterback

Name	Years	GP	GS	W	L	T	%
Tom Brady	2000–2019	285	283	219	64	—	.768
Steve Grogan	1975–1990	149	135	75	60	—	.556
Drew Bledsoe	1993–2001	124	123	63	60	—	.512
Babe Parilli	1961–1967	94	83	44	32	7	.572
Jim Plunkett	1971–1975	61	61	23	38	—	.377
Tony Eason	1983–1989	72	49	28	21	—	.571
Mac Jones	2021–2023	42	42	18	24	—	.429

== Team career passing records ==
These quarterbacks have over 10,000 career passing yards with the Patriots in regular season games.

Name	Comp	Att	%	Yds	TD	Int
Tom Brady	6,377	9,988	63.8	74,571	541	179
Drew Bledsoe	2,544	4,518	56.3	29,657	166	138
Steve Grogan	1,879	3,593	52.3	26,886	182	208
Babe Parilli	1,140	2,413	47.2	16,747	132	138
Jim Plunkett	729	1,503	48.5	12,665	62	87
Tony Eason	876	1,500	52.3	10,732	60	48

== See also ==
- Lists of NFL starting quarterbacks
- List of New England Patriots first-round draft picks
- History of the New England Patriots

== Notes ==
- ^{a} The regular season expanded to 16 games.
- ^{b} Strikes by the National Football League Players Association in the 1982 and 1987 seasons resulted in shortened seasons (9- and 15-game schedules, respectively).
- ^{c} The regular season expanded to 17 games.
