= List of Baltimore Ravens starting quarterbacks =

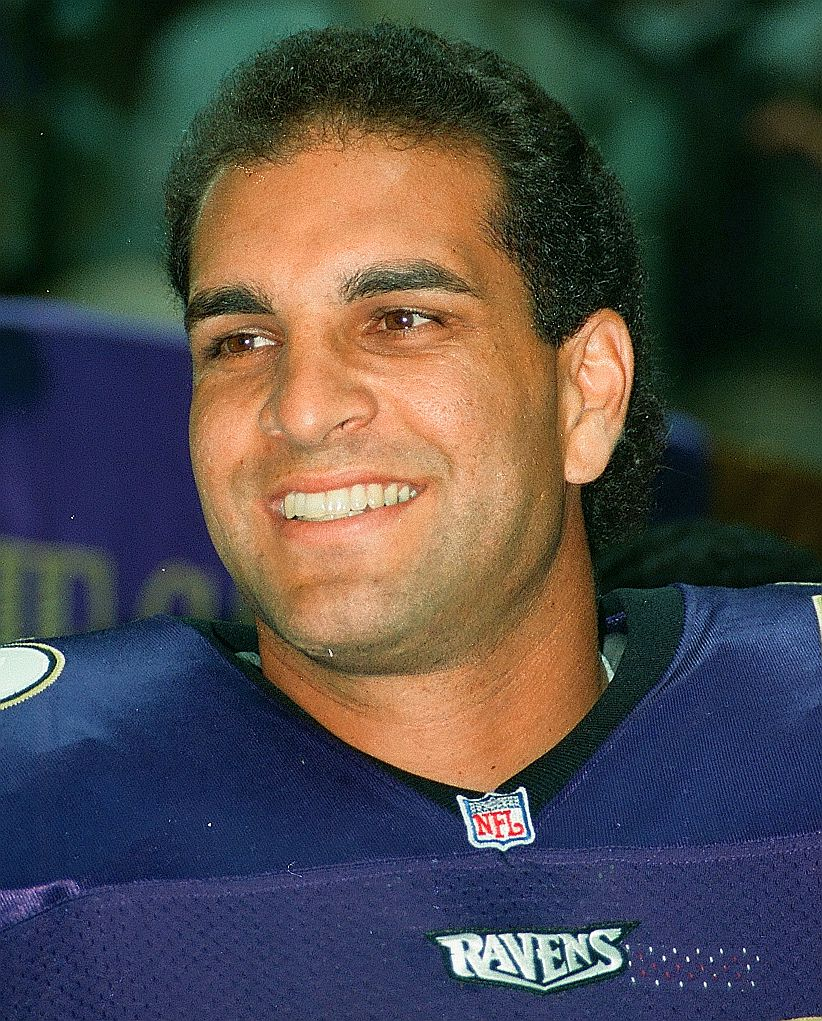
Vinny Testaverde (1996–1997)

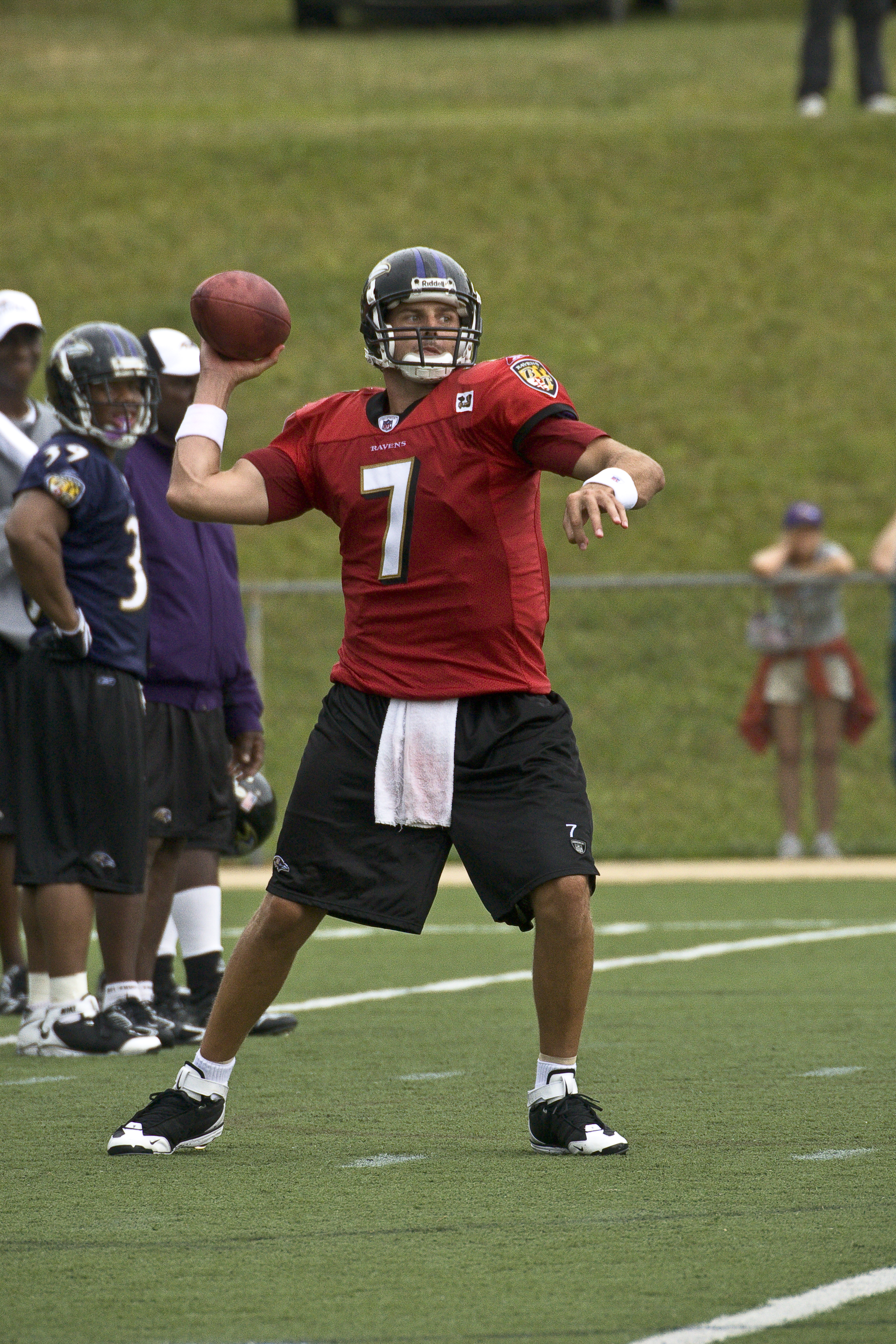
Kyle Boller (2003–2005, 2007)

Twenty-seven quarterbacks have started at least one game for the Baltimore Ravens of the National Football League (NFL). Seven of those quarterbacks have started at least one playoff game for the Ravens. These players are listed in order of the date of each player's first start at quarterback for the Ravens.

== Quarterback starts (by season) ==
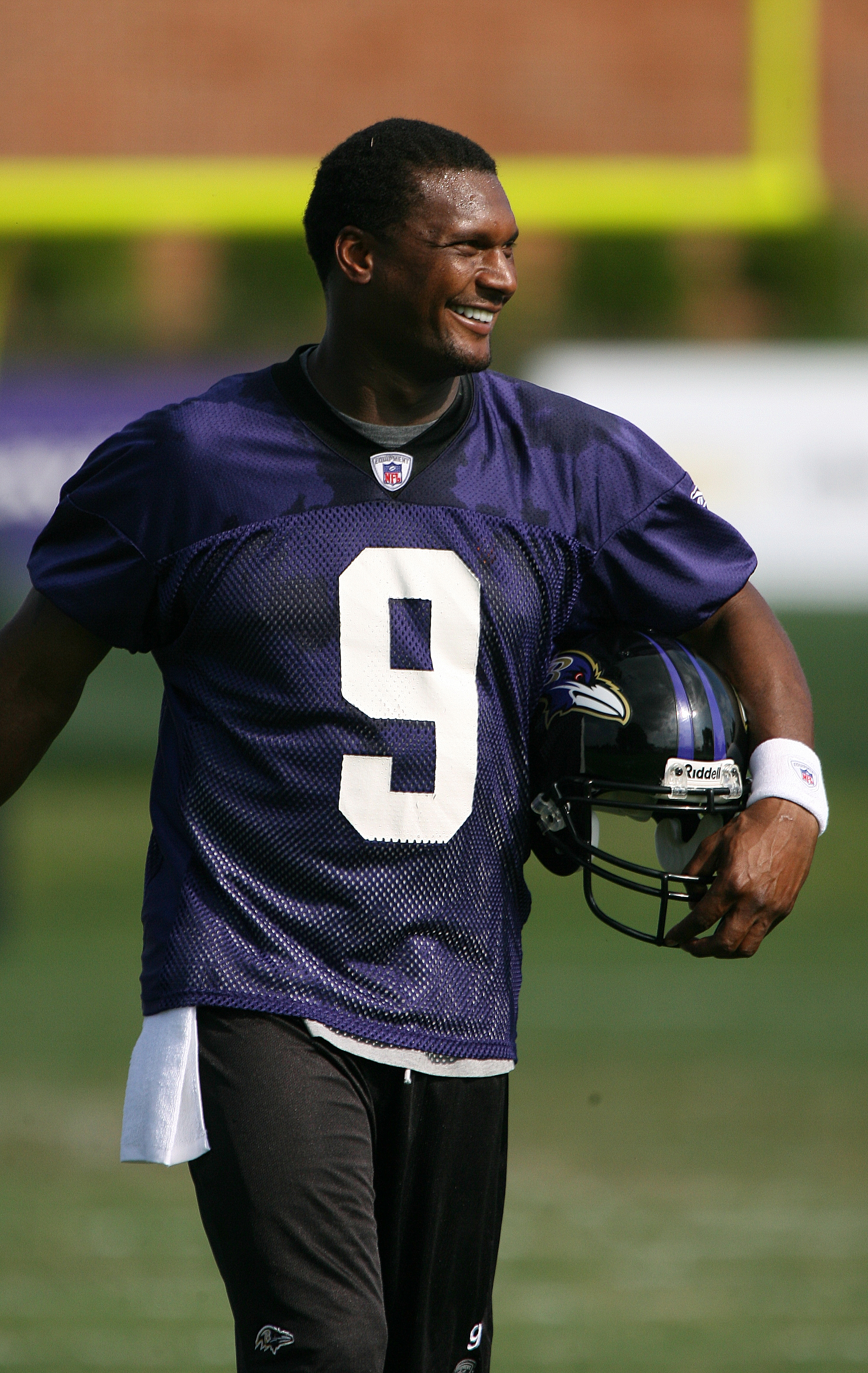
Steve McNair (2006–2007)

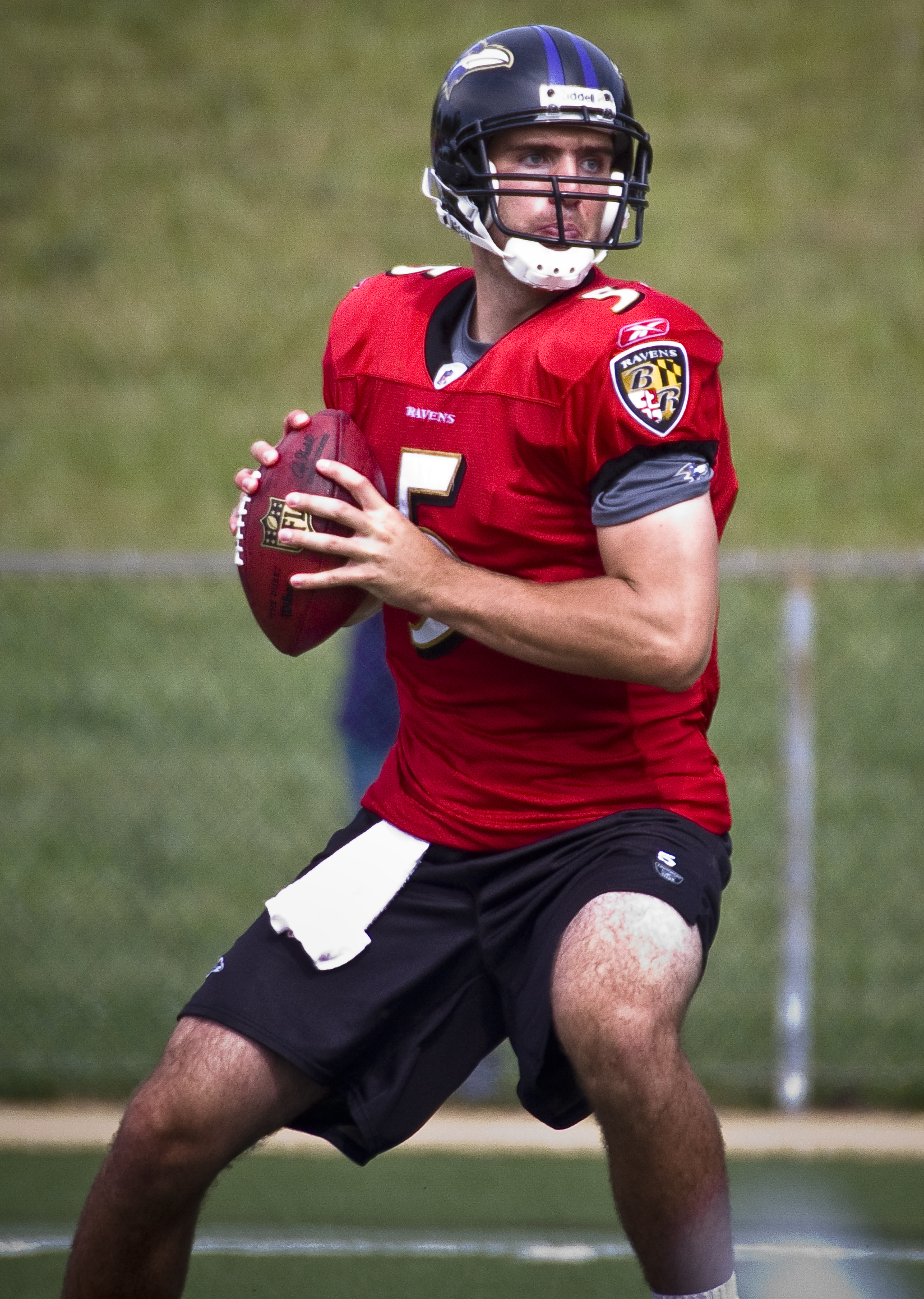
Joe Flacco (2008–2018)

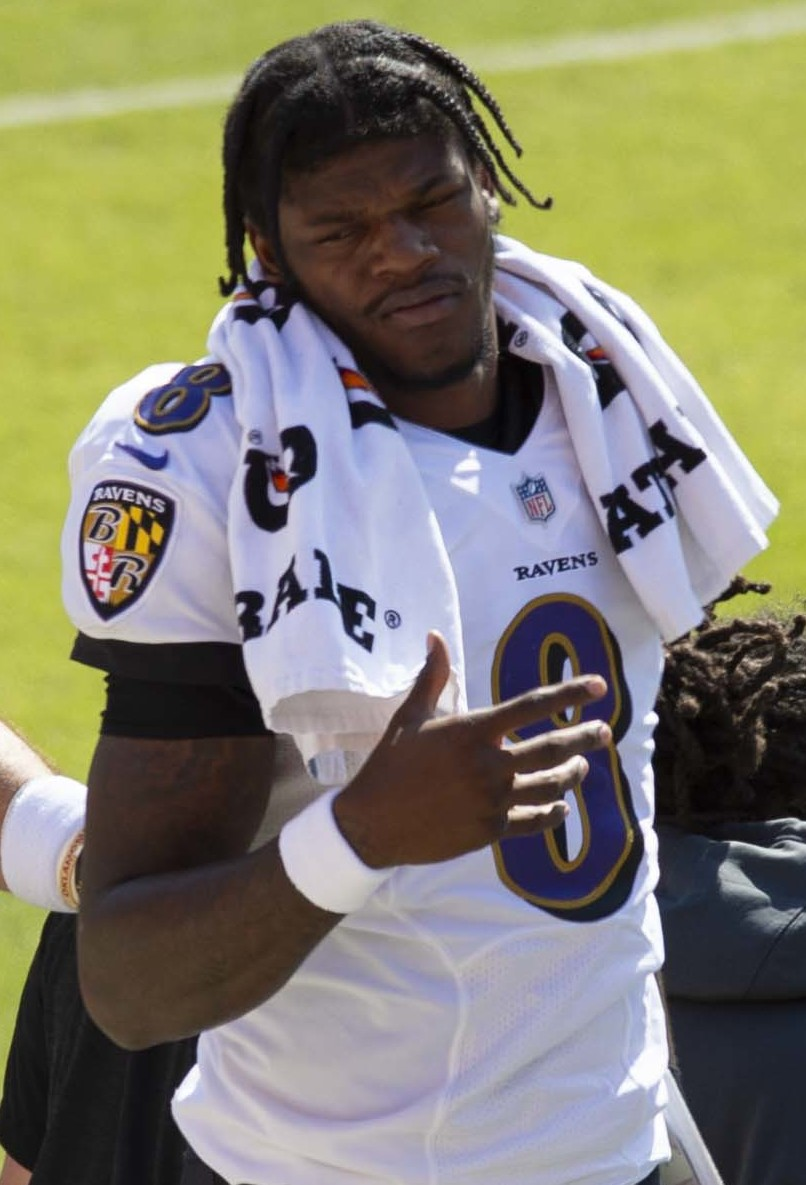
Lamar Jackson (2018–present)

The number of games started during the season is listed in parentheses to the right of the player's name; playoff starts are listed as wins–losses.

Season	Regular season	Playoffs
1996	Vinny Testaverde (16)	
1997	Vinny Testaverde (13) / Eric Zeier (3)	
1998	Jim Harbaugh (12) / Eric Zeier (4)	
1999	Tony Banks (10) / Stoney Case (4) / Scott Mitchell (2)	
2000	Tony Banks (8) / Trent Dilfer (8)	Trent Dilfer (4–0)
2001	Elvis Grbac (14) / Randall Cunningham (2)	Elvis Grbac (1–1)
2002	Jeff Blake (10) / Chris Redman (6)	
2003	Kyle Boller (9) / Anthony Wright (7)	Anthony Wright (0–1)
2004	Kyle Boller (16)	
2005	Kyle Boller (9) / Anthony Wright (7)	
2006	Steve McNair (16)	Steve McNair (0–1)
2007	Kyle Boller (8) / Steve McNair (6) / Troy Smith (2)	
2008	Joe Flacco (16)	Joe Flacco (2–1)
2009	Joe Flacco (16)	Joe Flacco (1–1)
2010	Joe Flacco (16)	Joe Flacco (1–1)
2011	Joe Flacco (16)	Joe Flacco (1–1)
2012	Joe Flacco (16)	Joe Flacco (4–0)
2013	Joe Flacco (16)	
2014	Joe Flacco (16)	Joe Flacco (1–1)
2015	Joe Flacco (10) / Matt Schaub (2) / Jimmy Clausen (2) / Ryan Mallett (2)	
2016	Joe Flacco (16)	
2017	Joe Flacco (16)	
2018	Joe Flacco (9) / Lamar Jackson (7)	Lamar Jackson (0–1)
2019	Lamar Jackson (15) / Robert Griffin III (1)	Lamar Jackson (0–1)
2020	Lamar Jackson (15) / Robert Griffin III (1)	Lamar Jackson (1–1)
2021	Lamar Jackson (12) / Tyler Huntley (4) / Josh Johnson (1)	
2022	Lamar Jackson (12) / Tyler Huntley (4) / Anthony Brown (1)	Tyler Huntley (0−1)
2023	Lamar Jackson (16) / Tyler Huntley (1)	Lamar Jackson (1−1)
2024	Lamar Jackson (17)	Lamar Jackson (1–1)
2025	Lamar Jackson (13) / Tyler Huntley (2) / Cooper Rush (2)	
2026	Lamar Jackson (5) / Tyler Huntley (3) / Joe Fagnano (1) / Jacoby Brissett (1)	

== Most games as starting quarterback ==
Accurate as of Week 9 of the 2026 NFL season.

GP	Games played
GS	Games started
W	Number of wins as starting quarterback
L	Number of losses as starting quarterback
T	Number of ties as starting quarterback
Pct	Winning percentage as starting quarterback

=== Regular season ===
Name	GP	GS	W	L	T	Pct
Joe Flacco	163	163	96	67	0	.589
Lamar Jackson	121	112	79	33	0	.705
Kyle Boller	53	42	20	22	0	.476
Vinny Testaverde	29	29	8	20	1	.293
Steve McNair	22	22	15	7	0	.682
Tony Banks	26	18	11	7	0	.611
Anthony Wright	16	14	7	7	0	.500
Elvis Grbac	14	14	8	6	0	.571
Tyler Huntley	30	14	6	8	0	.429
Jim Harbaugh	14	12	5	7	0	.417
Jeff Blake	11	10	4	6	0	.400
Trent Dilfer	11	8	7	1	0	.875
Eric Zeier	16	7	3	4	0	.429
Chris Redman	11	6	3	3	0	.500

=== Playoffs ===
Name	GP	GS	W	L	Pct
Joe Flacco	15	15	10	5	.667
Lamar Jackson	8	8	3	5	.375
Trent Dilfer	4	4	4	0	1.000
Elvis Grbac	2	2	1	1	.500
Tyler Huntley	2	1	0	1	.000
Steve McNair	1	1	0	1	.000
Anthony Wright	1	1	0	1	.000

== Team career passing records ==
Accurate as of week 2 of the 2026 NFL season.

Cmp	Pass completions
Att	Pass attempts
%	Completion percentage
Yds	Passing yards
TD	Passing touchdowns
Int	Interceptions thrown
Rate	Passer rating

=== Regular season ===
Name	Cmp	Att	%	Yds	TD	Int	Rate
Joe Flacco	3,499	5,670	61.7	38,245	212	136	84.1
Lamar Jackson	1,908	2,944	64.8	23,167	189	57	102.2
Kyle Boller	746	1,311	56.9	7,846	45	44	71.9
Vinny Testaverde	596	1,019	58.5	7,148	51	34	82.8
Steve McNair	428	673	63.6	4,163	18	16	79.9
Tony Banks	319	594	53.7	3,714	25	16	75.7
Elvis Grbac	265	467	56.7	3,033	15	18	71.1
Anthony Wright	258	444	58.1	2,781	15	17	71.9
Tyler Huntley	273	409	66.7	2,383	10	7	83.0
Eric Zeier	184	318	57.9	2,367	12	5	87.3
Jeff Blake	165	295	55.9	2,084	13	11	77.3
Jim Harbaugh	164	293	56.0	1,839	12	11	72.9
Trent Dilfer	134	226	59.3	1,502	12	11	76.6
Chris Redman	106	198	53.5	1,111	7	5	71.3

=== Playoffs ===
Name	Cmp	Att	%	Yds	TD	Int	Rate
Joe Flacco	253	447	56.6	3,223	25	10	88.6
Lamar Jackson	146	241	60.6	1,753	10	7	84.6
Trent Dilfer	35	73	47.9	590	3	1	83.7
Elvis Grbac	30	55	54.6	286	1	3	52.5
Tyler Huntley	23	42	54.8	286	2	1	82.0
Anthony Wright	20	37	54.1	214	1	2	57.7
Steve McNair	18	29	62.1	173	0	2	49.9

== See also ==
- List of NFL starting quarterbacks
