= List of Houston Texans starting quarterbacks =

The Houston Texans are a professional American football team based in Houston, Texas. The Texans are members of the South division in the American Football Conference (AFC) of the National Football League (NFL). They were founded in 1999 and began play as an expansion team in 2002. The team was owned by Bob McNair until his death in 2018; following McNair's death, the majority ownership of the team went to his wife, Janice. The Texans are the youngest franchise currently competing in the NFL.

In American football, the quarterback is widely regarded as the most important position, responsible for on-field decision-making as well taking the snap on almost all offensive plays. Only one quarterback can start any given game for each team.

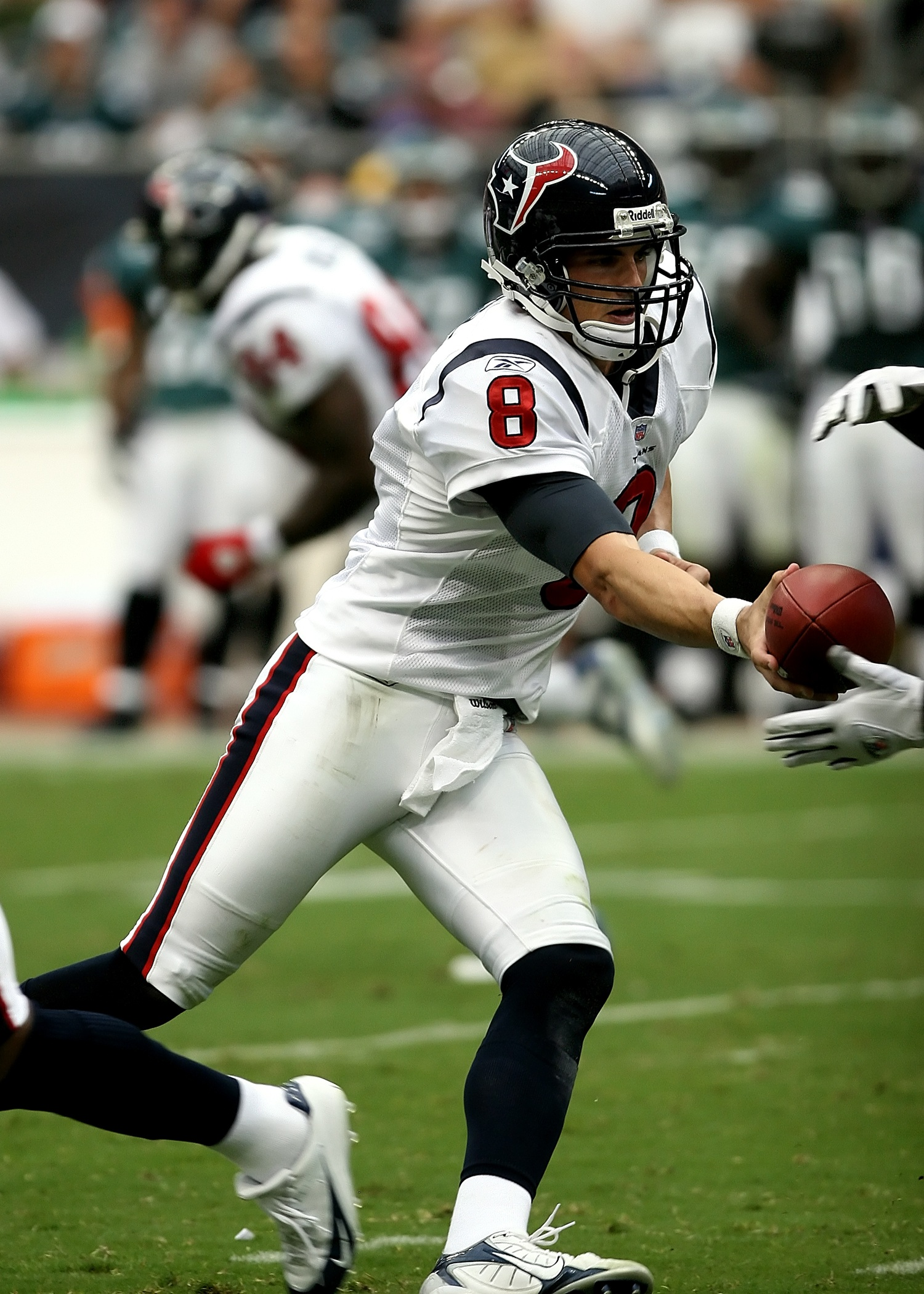
David Carr (2002–2006)

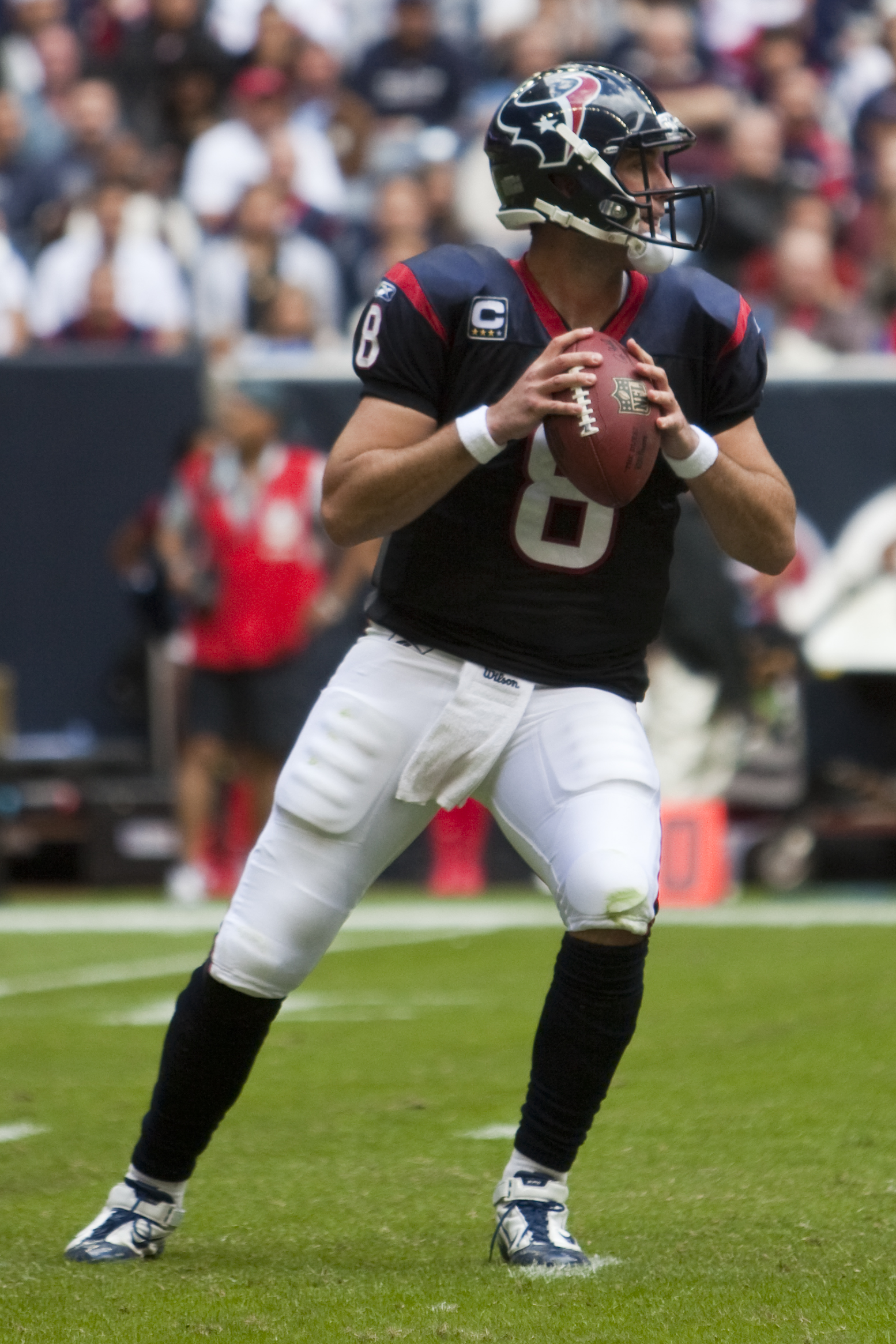
Matt Schaub (2007–2013)

These quarterbacks have started at least one game for the Houston Texans of the National Football League.

== Regular season ==
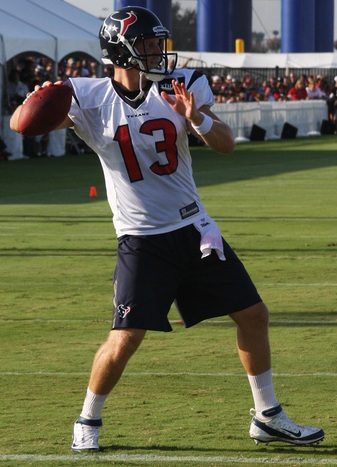
T. J. Yates (2011, 2015, 2017)

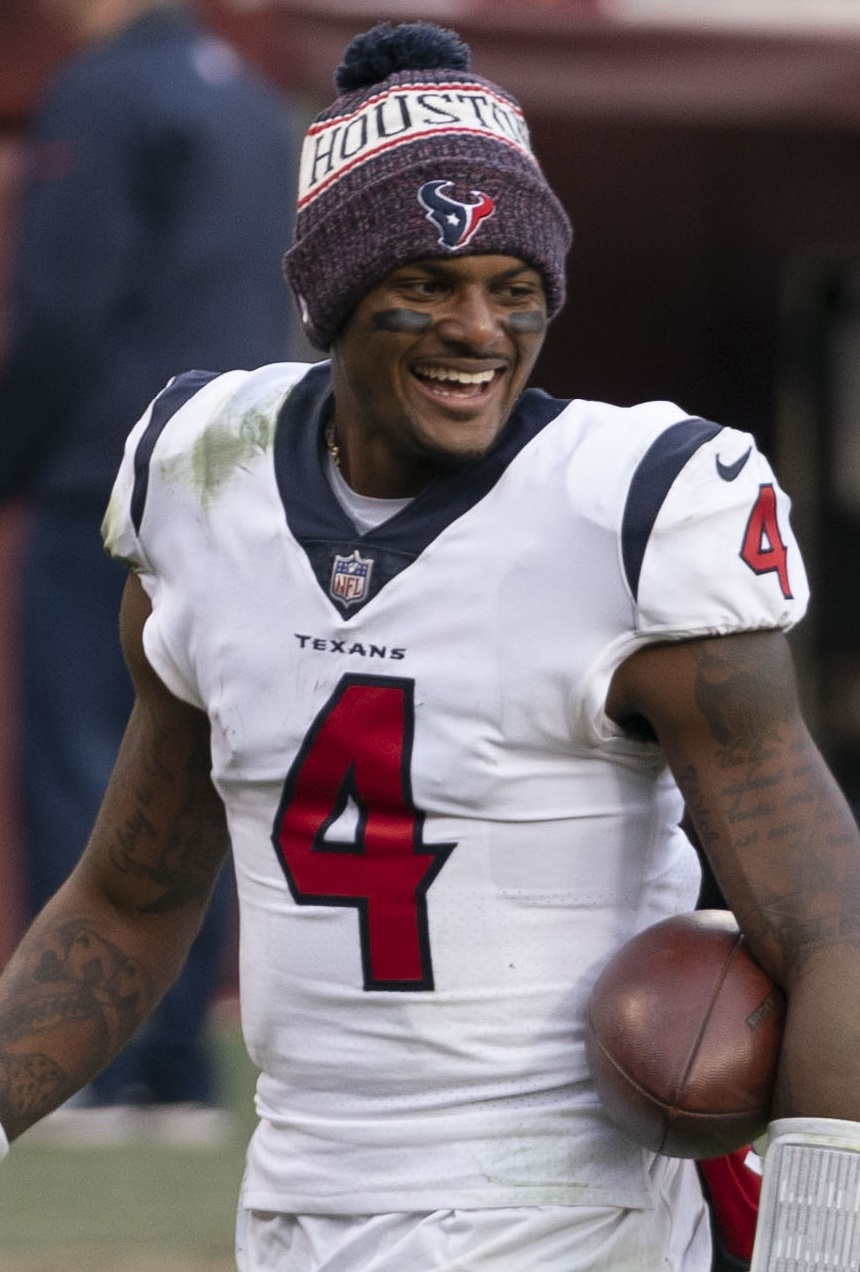
Deshaun Watson (2017–2020)

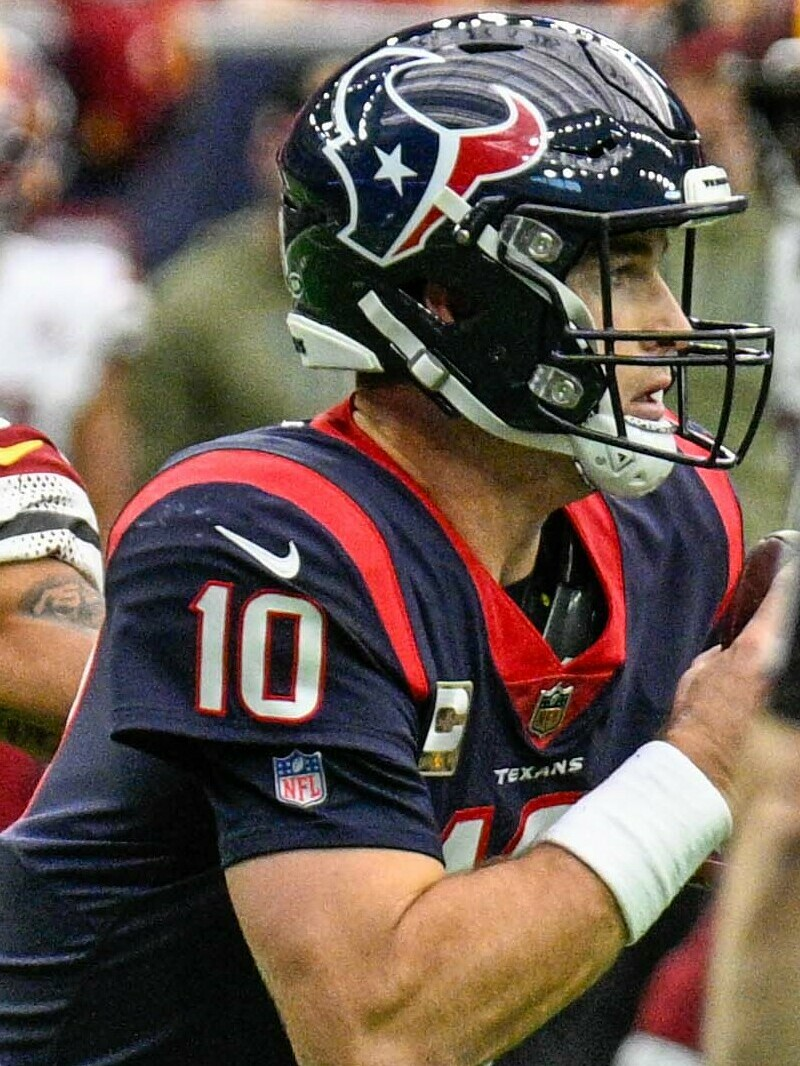
Davis Mills (2021–2022, 2025)

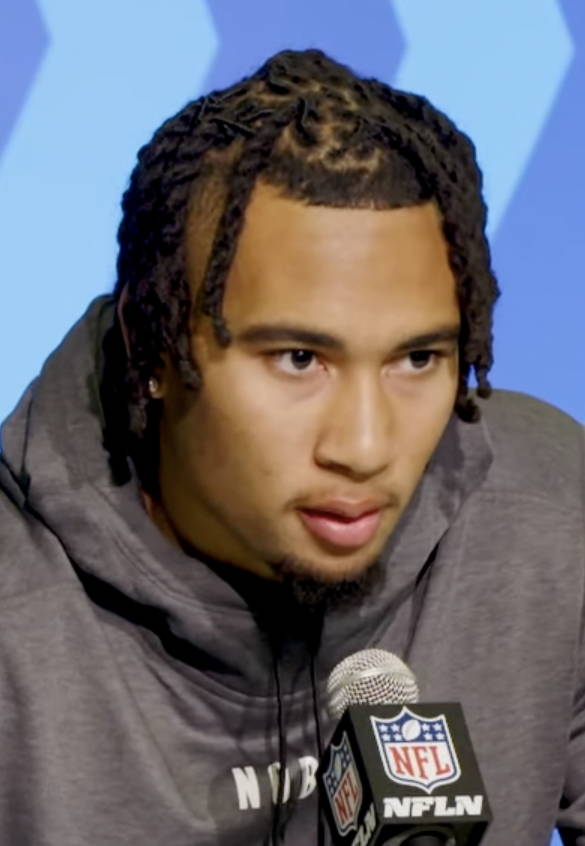
C. J. Stroud (2023–present)

The number of games they started during the season is listed to the right:

Season(s)	Quarterback(s)	References
2002	David Carr (16)	
2003	David Carr (11) / Tony Banks (3) / Dave Ragone (2)	
2004	David Carr (16)	
2005	David Carr (16)	
2006	David Carr (16)	
2007	Matt Schaub (11) / Sage Rosenfels (5)	
2008	Matt Schaub (11) / Sage Rosenfels (5)	
2009	Matt Schaub (16)	
2010	Matt Schaub (16)	
2011	Matt Schaub (10) / Matt Leinart (1) / T. J. Yates (5)	
2012	Matt Schaub (16)	
2013	Matt Schaub (8) / Case Keenum (8)	
2014	Ryan Fitzpatrick (12) / Ryan Mallett (2) / Case Keenum (2)	
2015	Brian Hoyer (9) / Ryan Mallett (4) / T. J. Yates (2) / Brandon Weeden (1)	
2016	Brock Osweiler (14) / Tom Savage (2)	
2017	Tom Savage (7) / Deshaun Watson (6) / T. J. Yates (3)	
2018	Deshaun Watson (16)	
2019	Deshaun Watson (15) / A. J. McCarron (1)	
2020	Deshaun Watson (16)	
2021	Davis Mills (11) / Tyrod Taylor (6)	
2022	Davis Mills (14) / Kyle Allen (2) / Jeff Driskel (1)	
2023	C. J. Stroud (15) / Case Keenum (2)	
2024	C. J. Stroud (17)	
2025	C. J. Stroud (14) / Davis Mills (3)	
2026	C. J. Stroud (10)	

== Postseason ==
Season	Quarterback(s)
2011	T. J. Yates (1–1)
2012	Matt Schaub (1–1)
2015	Brian Hoyer (0–1)
2016	Brock Osweiler (1–1)
2018	Deshaun Watson (0–1)
2019	Deshaun Watson (1–1)
2023	C. J. Stroud (1–1)
2024	C. J. Stroud (1–1)
2025	C. J. Stroud (1–1)

== Most games as starting quarterback ==
These quarterbacks have the most starts for the Texans in regular season games.

Name	Period	Starts	Wins	Losses	Ties	Win %
Matt Schaub	2007–2013	88	46	42	0	.523
David Carr	2002–2006	75	22	53	0	.293
C. J. Stroud	2023–2026	56	32	24	0	.571
Deshaun Watson	2017–2020	53	28	25	0	.528
Davis Mills	2021–2022, 2025	28	8	19	1	.304
Brock Osweiler	2016	14	8	6	0	.571
Ryan Fitzpatrick	2014	12	6	6	0	.500
Case Keenum	2013–2014, 2023	12	3	9	0	.250
Sage Rosenfels	2007–2008	10	6	4	0	.600
T. J. Yates	2011, 2015, 2017	10	4	6	0	.400
Brian Hoyer	2015	9	5	4	0	.556
Tom Savage	2016–2017	9	2	7	0	.222
Ryan Mallett	2014–2015	6	2	4	0	.333
Tyrod Taylor	2021	6	2	4	0	.333
Tony Banks	2003	3	2	1	0	.667
Dave Ragone	2003	2	0	2	0	.000
Kyle Allen	2022	2	0	2	0	.000
Matt Leinart	2011	1	1	0	0	1.000
Brandon Weeden	2015	1	1	0	0	1.000
A. J. McCarron	2019	1	0	1	0	.000
Jeff Driskel	2021–2022	1	0	1	0	.000

== See also ==
- Lists of NFL starting quarterbacks
