= List of Carolina Panthers starting quarterbacks =

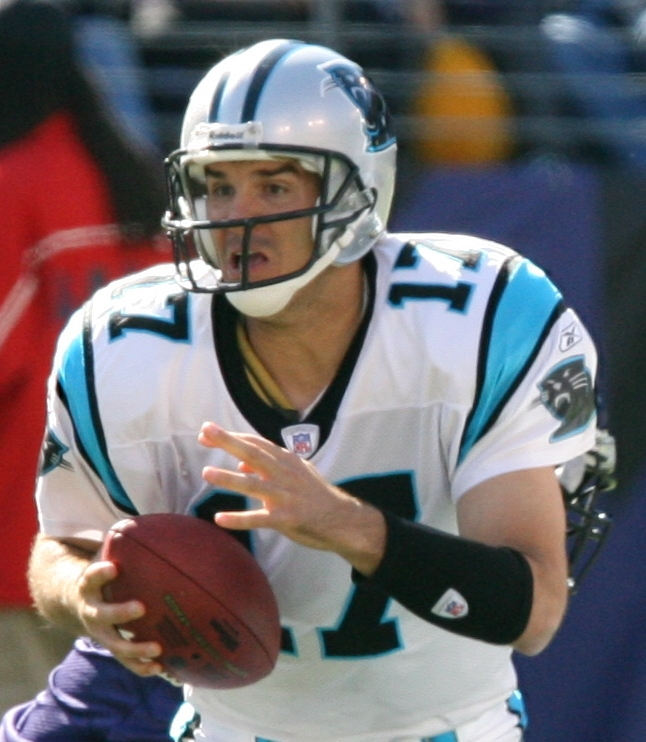
Jake Delhomme (2003–2009)

These quarterbacks have started at least one game for the Carolina Panthers of the National Football League (NFL).

== Quarterback starts (by season) ==
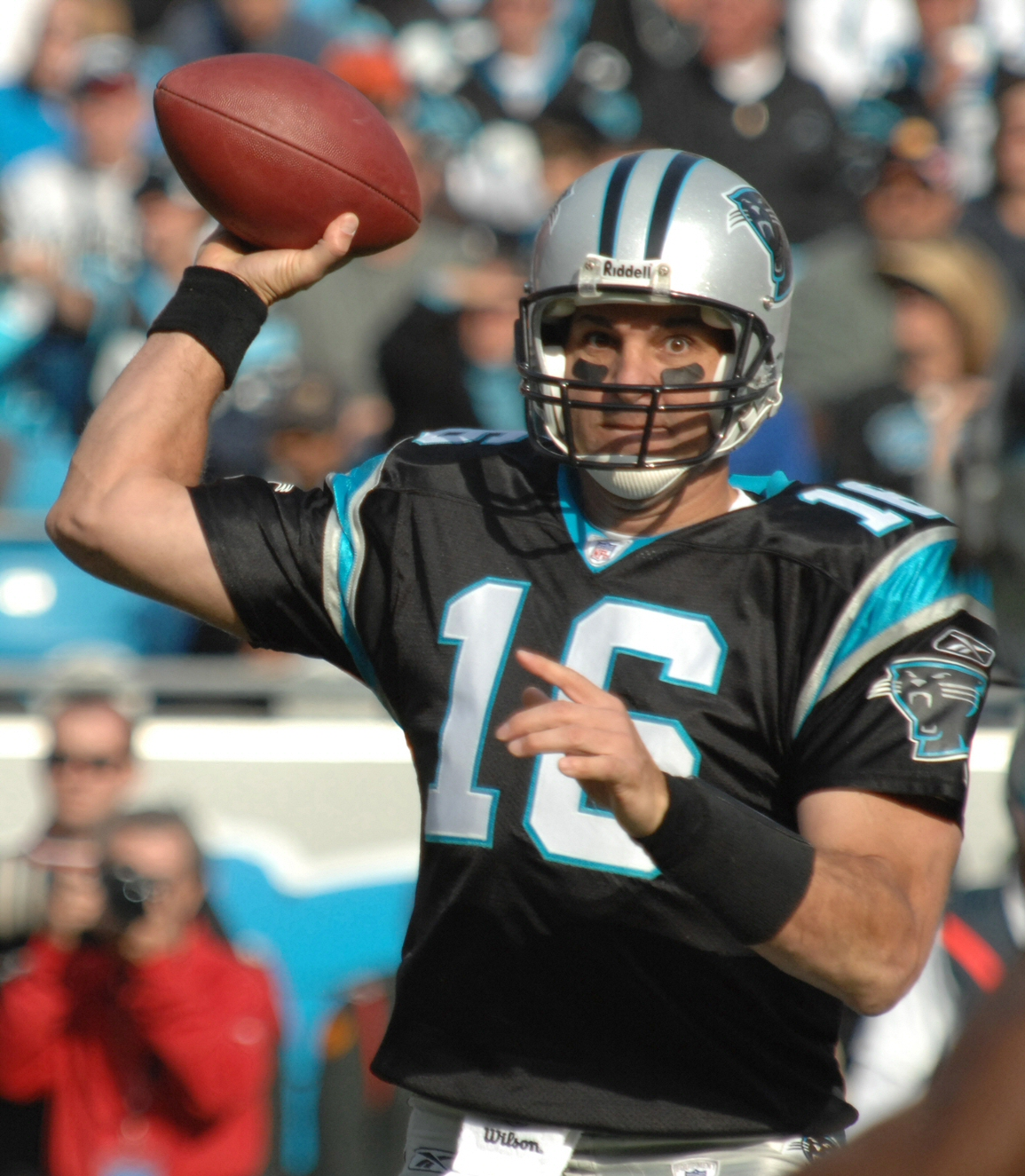
Vinny Testaverde (2007)

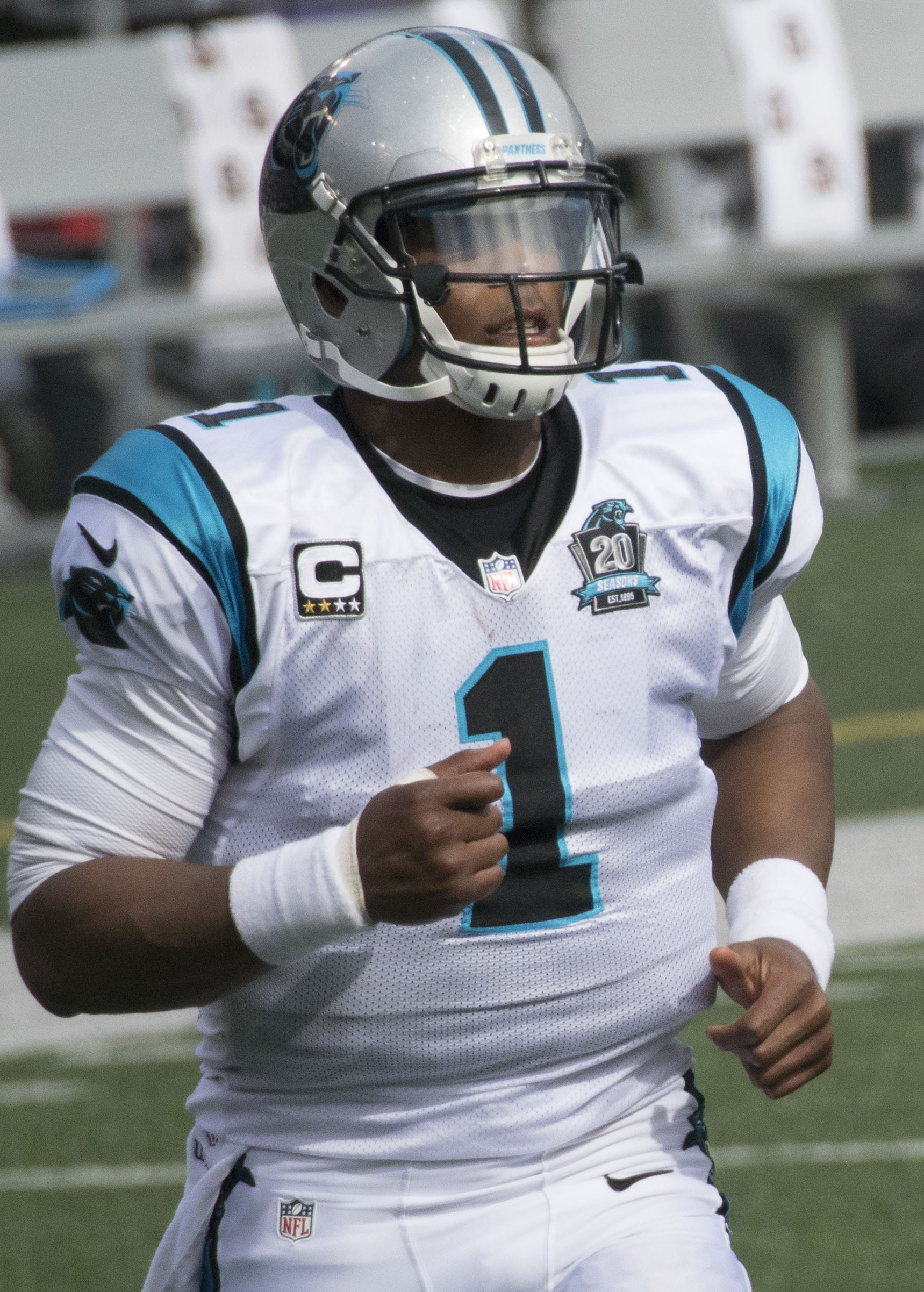
Cam Newton (2011–2019, 2021)

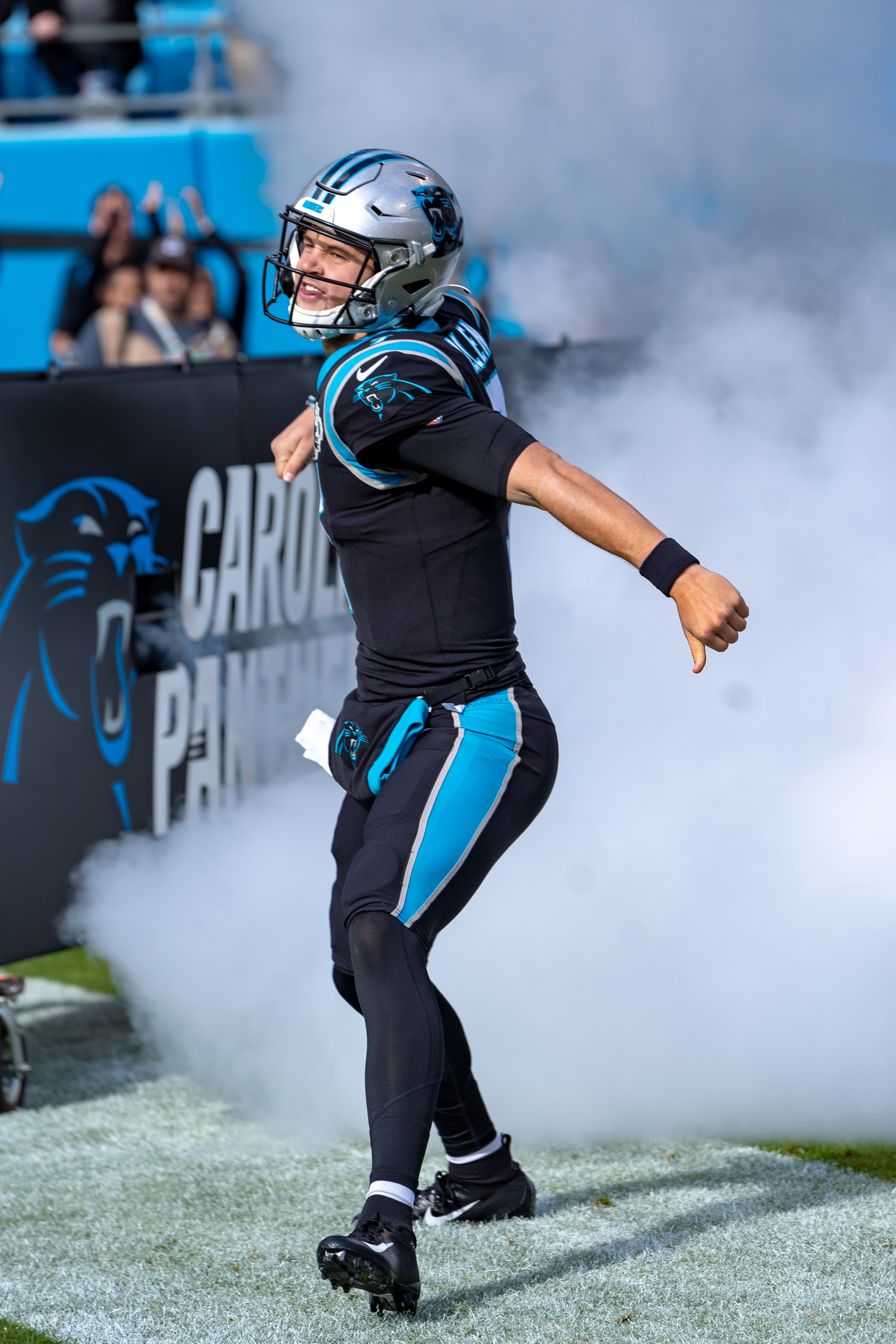
Kyle Allen (2018–2019)

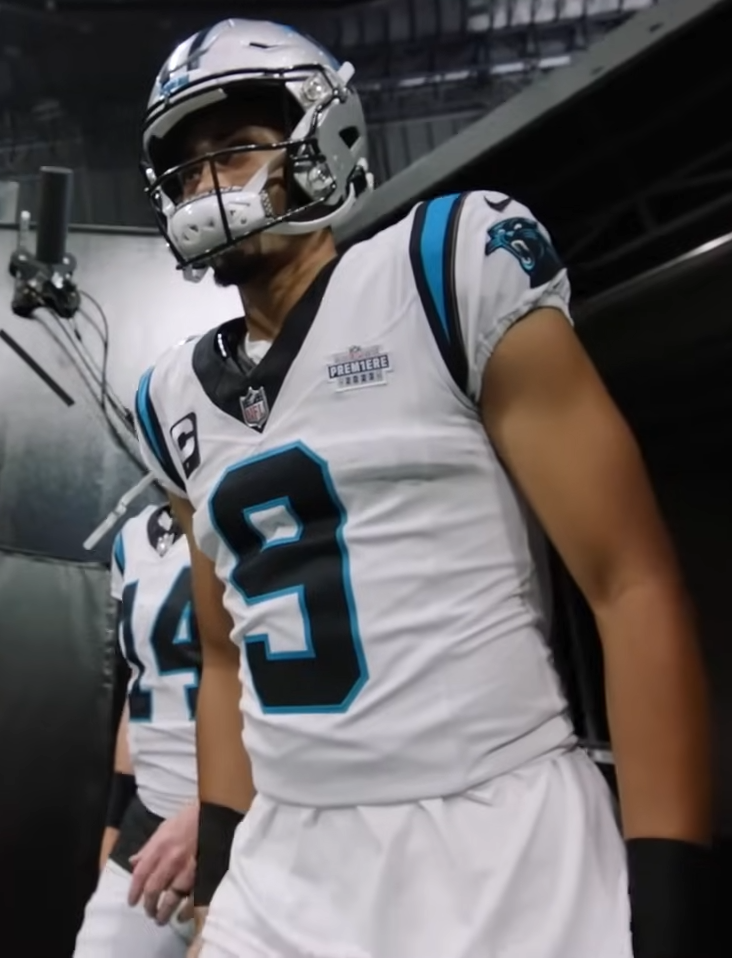
Bryce Young (2023–present)

The number of games started during the season is listed to the right of the player's name.

Season	Regular season	Postseason	Ref.
1995	Kerry Collins (7–6) / Frank Reich (0–3)		
1996	Kerry Collins (9–3) / Steve Beuerlein (3–1)	Kerry Collins (1–1)	
1997	Kerry Collins (6–7) / Steve Beuerlein (1–2)		
1998	Steve Beuerlein (4–8) / Kerry Collins (0–4)		
1999	Steve Beuerlein (8–8)		
2000	Steve Beuerlein (7–9)		
2001	Chris Weinke (1–14) / Matt Lytle (0–1)		
2002	Rodney Peete (7–7) / Chris Weinke (0–1) / Randy Fasani (0–1)		
2003	Jake Delhomme (10–5) / Rodney Peete (1–0)	Jake Delhomme (3–1)	
2004	Jake Delhomme (7–9)		
2005	Jake Delhomme (11–5)	Jake Delhomme (2–1)	
2006	Jake Delhomme (7–6) / Chris Weinke (1–2)		
2007	Vinny Testaverde (2–4) / David Carr (1–3) / Jake Delhomme (2–1) / Matt Moore (2–1)		
2008	Jake Delhomme (12–4)	Jake Delhomme (0–1)	
2009	Jake Delhomme (4–7) / Matt Moore (4–1)		
2010	Jimmy Clausen (1–9) / Matt Moore (1–4) / Brian St. Pierre (0–1)		
2011	Cam Newton (6–10)		
2012	Cam Newton (7–9)		
2013	Cam Newton (12–4)	Cam Newton (0–1)	
2014	Cam Newton (5–8–1) / Derek Anderson (2–0)	Cam Newton (1–1)	
2015	Cam Newton (15–1)	Cam Newton (2–1)	
2016	Cam Newton (6–8) / Derek Anderson (0–2)		
2017	Cam Newton (11–5)	Cam Newton (0–1)	
2018	Cam Newton (6–8) / Kyle Allen (1–0) / Taylor Heinicke (0–1)		
2019	Kyle Allen (5–7) / Cam Newton (0–2) / Will Grier (0–2)		
2020	Teddy Bridgewater (4–11) / P. J. Walker (1–0)		
2021	Sam Darnold (4–7) / Cam Newton (0–5) / P. J. Walker (1–0)		
2022	Sam Darnold (4–2) / Baker Mayfield (1–5) / P. J. Walker (2–3)		
2023	Bryce Young (2–14) / Andy Dalton (0–1)		
2024	Bryce Young (4–8) / Andy Dalton (1–4)		
2025	Bryce Young (8–8) / Andy Dalton (0–1)	Bryce Young (0–1)	
2026	Bryce Young (3–2)		

== Most games as starting quarterback ==
The following quarterbacks have the most starts for the Panthers in regular season games. Bold text indicates the player is currently on the team's roster.

Name	
GP	Games played
GS	Games started
W	Number of wins as starting quarterback
L	Number of losses as starting quarterback
T	Number of ties as starting quarterback
Pct	Winning percentage as starting quarterback

Name	GP	GS	W	L	T	Pct
Cam Newton	133	129	68	60	1	.531
Jake Delhomme	91	90	53	37	0	.589
Steve Beuerlein	59	51	23	28	0	.451
**Bryce Young**	53	51	17	34	0	.333
Kerry Collins	45	42	22	20	0	.524
Chris Weinke	27	19	2	17	0	.105
Sam Darnold	18	17	8	9	0	.471
Rodney Peete	16	15	8	7	0	.533
Teddy Bridgewater	15	15	4	11	0	.267
Matt Moore	22	13	7	6	0	.538
Kyle Allen	15	13	6	7	0	.462
Jimmy Clausen	13	10	1	9	0	.100
P. J. Walker	15	7	4	3	0	.571
Andy Dalton	13	7	1	6	0	.143
Vinny Testaverde	7	6	2	4	0	.333
Baker Mayfield	7	6	1	5	0	.167
Derek Anderson	25	4	2	2	0	.500
David Carr	6	4	1	3	0	.250
Frank Reich	3	3	0	3	0	.000
Will Grier	2	2	0	2	0	.000
Randy Fasani	4	1	0	1	0	.000
Taylor Heinicke	6	1	0	1	0	.000
Matt Lytle	3	1	0	1	0	.000
Brian St. Pierre	1	1	0	1	0	.000

Through the 2025 NFL season

== Team career passing records ==
(Through the 2026 NFL Season)

Name	Comp	Att	%	Yds	TD	Int
Cam Newton	2,440	4,106	59.4	29,725	186	113
Jake Delhomme	1,580	2,669	59.2	19,258	120	89
Steve Beuerlein	1,041	1,723	60.4	12,690	86	50
Bryce Young	974	1,590	61.3	9,840	60	32
Kerry Collins	694	1,340	51.8	8,306	47	54

== See also ==
- List of NFL starting quarterbacks
