= Chatty =

Chatty or Chattie may refer to:

== Surname ==
- Dawn Chatty (born 1947), American social anthropologist and professor
- Habib Chatty (1916–1991), Tunisian politician and diplomat
- Kerim Chatty (born 1973), Swede suspected of attempted hijacking of an airplane in 2002

== Nickname or given name ==
- "Chattie", nickname of Charlotte Cooper (tennis) (1870–1966), English tennis player
- Chattie Davidson, Auburn Tigers quarterback in 1931 - see List of Auburn Tigers starting quarterbacks
- Charlotte Harnett, whose nickname led to an area being named first Chattie's Wood, then Chatswood, New South Wales
- Charlotte "Chatty" MacLean, a fictional character in the novel Anne of Windy Poplars, by Lucy Maud Montgomery

== See also ==
- Chaty, a near-extinct ethnic group of Russia
- Chatty, the default-sms application of Phosh interface, for Purism's Librem phones
