= Cam Newton =

American football player (born 1989)

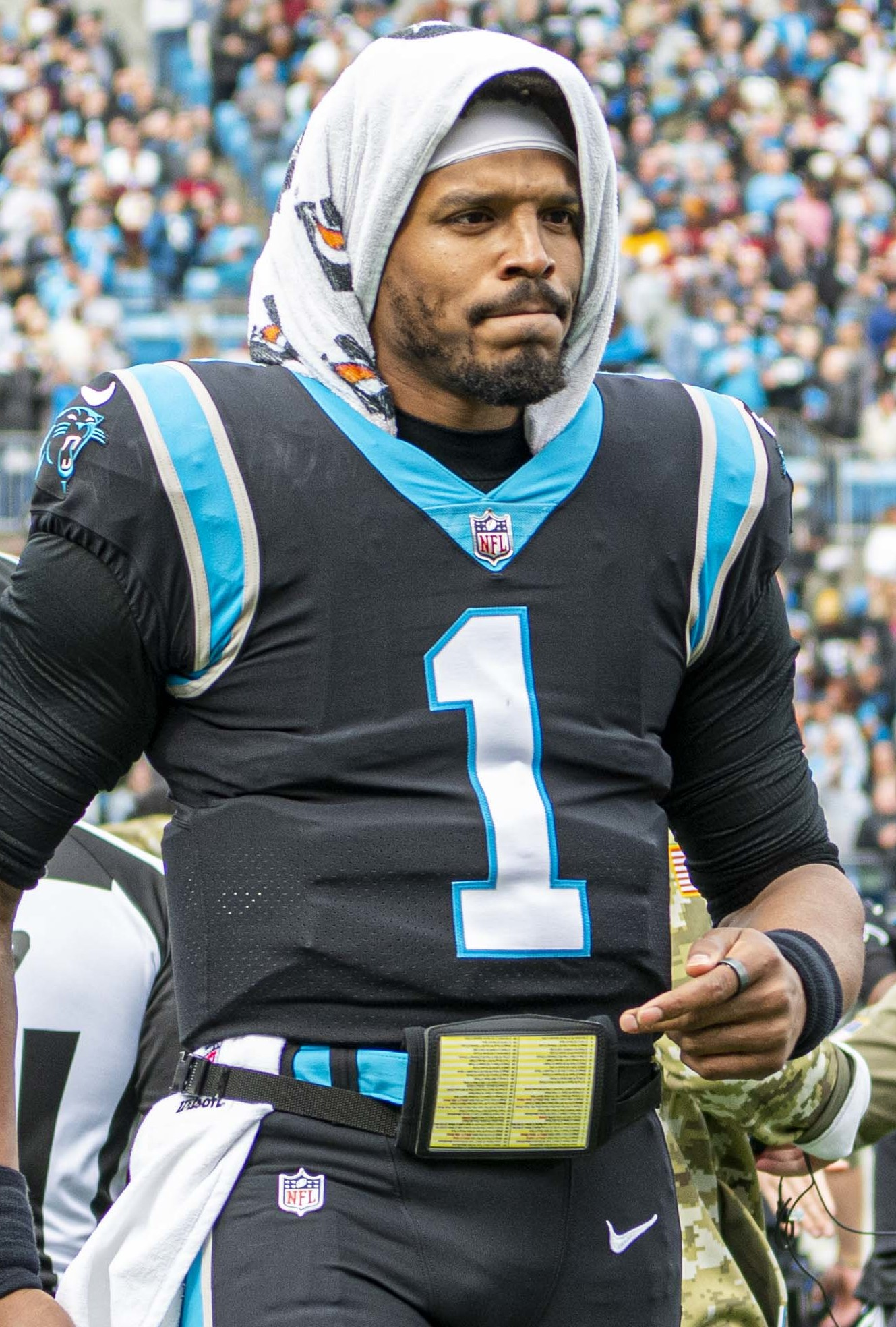
- Newton with the Carolina Panthers in 2021

No. 1
- Position: Quarterback

Personal information
- Born: May 11, 1989 (age 37); Atlanta, Georgia, U.S.
- Listed height: 6 ft 5 in (1.96 m)
- Listed weight: 245 lb (111 kg)

Career information
- High school: Westlake (Atlanta)
- College: Florida (2007–2008); Blinn (2009); Auburn (2010)
- NFL draft: 2011: 1st round, 1st overall pick

Career history
- Carolina Panthers (2011–2019); New England Patriots (2020); Carolina Panthers (2021)

Awards and highlights
- NFL Most Valuable Player (2015); NFL Offensive Player of the Year (2015); NFL Offensive Rookie of the Year (2011); First-team All-Pro (2015); 3× Pro Bowl (2011, 2013, 2015); 2× BCS national champion (2008, 2010); NJCAA national champion (2009); Heisman Trophy (2010); Auburn Tigers No. 2 retired; NFL records: Most career rushing attempts by a quarterback: 1,118

Career NFL statistics
- Passing attempts: 4,474
- Passing completions: 2,682
- Completion percentage: 59.9%
- TD–INT: 194–123
- Passing yards: 32,382
- Passer rating: 85.2
- Rushing yards: 5,628
- Rushing touchdowns: 75
- Stats at Pro Football Reference

Cameron Jerrell Newton (born May 11, 1989) is an American former professional football quarterback who played in the National Football League (NFL) for 11 seasons, primarily with the Carolina Panthers. Nicknamed "Super Cam", he is second in career quarterback rushing touchdowns and third in career quarterback rushing yards. Following a stint with the Florida Gators, Newton played college football for the Auburn Tigers, winning the Heisman Trophy in 2010 en route to a victory in the 2011 BCS National Championship Game. He was selected first overall by the Panthers in the 2011 NFL draft.

In his rookie year, Newton set the single season record for quarterback rushing touchdowns while also setting the rookie records for quarterback passing and rushing yards, earning him Offensive Rookie of the Year. From 2013 to 2017, Newton led the Panthers to four playoff appearances and three division titles. His most successful season came in 2015 when he was named the NFL Most Valuable Player (MVP) and helped Carolina obtain a franchise-best 15–1 record en route to an appearance in Super Bowl 50. Newton was also the first African American quarterback to outright win NFL MVP.

Following his MVP campaign, Newton struggled with injuries and reached the playoffs only once over the next four years. Released ahead of his 10th season, Newton played for the New England Patriots in 2020. He was released by the Patriots the following year and returned to the Panthers for his final season.

== Early life ==
Newton was born in Atlanta on May 11, 1989. He is the son of Jackie and Cecil Newton Sr., who was a safety for the 1983 Dallas Cowboys and 1984 Buffalo Bills, and the younger brother of Cecil Newton, a center who played in the NFL. His youngest brother, Caylin, was the quarterback for the Howard Bison in the mid-2010s.

Newton was a talented baseball and basketball player as a youth, but developed a fear of being hit by a pitch in baseball and could not avoid foul trouble on the basketball court. He stopped playing baseball at 14 years old and quit basketball shortly into his high school career. In 2015, Newton graduated from Auburn University with a degree in sociology.

Newton attended Westlake High School in Atlanta, playing for their high school football team. As a 16-year-old junior, he passed for 2,500 yards and 23 touchdowns and ran for 638 yards and nine touchdowns. After winning the state championship, he gained the attention of major college programs. In his senior year, Newton was rated a five-star prospect by Rivals.com, the No. 2 dual-threat quarterback in the nation, and the 14th quarterback and 28th player overall. He received scholarship offers from Florida, Georgia, Maryland, Ole Miss, Mississippi State, Oklahoma, and Virginia Tech. He committed to the University of Florida at the beginning of his senior year, becoming part of the top-rated recruiting class in the country for 2007.

College recruiting
Name	Hometown	School	Height	Weight	40^{‡}	Commit date
Cameron Newton; QB	Atlanta, GA	Westlake HS	6 ft 5 in (1.96 m)	235 lb (107 kg)	4.51	Sep 7, 2006
Cameron Newton; QB	Recruit ratings: Scout: Rivals: 247Sports: (81)					
Overall recruit ranking: Scout: 14 (QB) Rivals: 2 (Dual-threat QB) 247Sports: 3 (Dual-threat QB) ESPN: 9 (QB)
Note: In many cases, Scout, Rivals, 247Sports, On3, and ESPN may conflict in their listings of height and weight.; In these cases, the average was taken. ESPN grades are on a 100-point scale.; Sources: "Florida Football Commitments". Rivals.; "2007 Florida Football Commits". Scout.; "ESPN". ESPN.; "Scout.com Team Recruiting Rankings". Scout.; "2007 Team Ranking". Rivals.com.

== College career ==
=== University of Florida ===
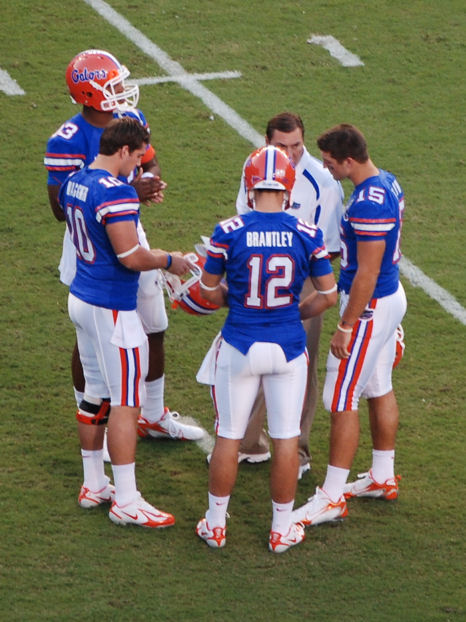
Newton, far left, with Dan Mullen, John Brantley, Tim Tebow, and Bryan Waggener during his freshman season at Florida

Newton initially attended the University of Florida, where he was a member of the Florida Gators football team in 2007 and 2008 under head coach Urban Meyer. As a freshman in 2007, Newton beat out fellow freshman quarterback John Brantley as the back-up for eventual Heisman Trophy winner Tim Tebow. He played in five games, passing for 40 yards on 5-of-10 and rushing 16 times for 103 yards and three touchdowns. In 2008, during his sophomore season, Newton played in the season opener against Hawaii but sustained an ankle injury and took a medical redshirt season.

On November 21, 2008, Newton was arrested on felony charges of burglary, larceny, and obstruction of justice on an accusation that he stole a laptop computer from another University of Florida student. He was subsequently suspended from the team. Campus police "tracked the stolen laptop to the athlete...Newton tossed the computer out his dorm window in a humorously ill-advised attempt to hide it from cops." All charges against Newton were dropped after he completed a court-approved pre-trial diversion program. "I believe that a person should not be thought of as a bad person because of some senseless mistake that they made," said Newton in 2010. "I think every person should have a second chance. If they blow that second chance, so be it for them." Newton announced his intention to transfer from Florida three days before the Gators' national championship win over Oklahoma. In November 2010, Thayer Evans of Fox Sports reported that Newton faced potential expulsion from the University of Florida for three instances of academic dishonesty, prior to transferring.

=== Blinn College ===
In January 2009, Newton transferred to Blinn College in Brenham, Texas, to play for head coach Brad Franchione, son of Dennis Franchione. That fall, he led his team to the 2009 NJCAA National Football Championship, throwing for 2,833 yards with 22 touchdowns and rushing for 655 yards. He was named a Juco All-American honorable mention and was the most recruited Juco quarterback in the country. Newton was ranked as the number one quarterback from either high school or junior college by Rivals.com and was the only five-star recruit. During Newton's recruitment, Oklahoma, Mississippi State and Auburn were his three finalists. He eventually signed with the Auburn Tigers.

=== Auburn University ===
In the offseason prior to his season at Auburn, Newton won the starting quarterback job. Auburn offensive coordinator Gus Malzahn worked with Newton to refine his throwing mechanics and learn Malzahn's offense as a dual-threat quarterback. Newton started the first game of Auburn University's 2010 season, a home win over Arkansas State on September 4, 2010. Newton accounted for 186 passing yards, 171 rushing yards, and five total offensive touchdowns. He was named SEC Offensive Player of the Week following his performance in the 52–26 victory. Three weeks later, Newton had a second break-out game with 158 passing yards, 176 rushing yards, and five total touchdowns against the South Carolina Gamecocks in the 35–27 victory. On October 2, Newton led Auburn to a 52–3 victory over Louisiana-Monroe. He completed three touchdown passes, one of which went for 94 yards to Emory Blake. It was the longest touchdown pass and offensive play in school history. On October 9, Newton led Auburn to a 37–34 victory over Kentucky. He passed for 210 yards and rushed for 198 yards including four rushing touchdowns. On October 16, during the Arkansas game, Newton ran for 188 rushing yards and three rushing touchdowns and threw one touchdown pass in the 65–43 victory. Following these performances, media reports began to list Newton among the top candidates to watch for the Heisman Trophy.

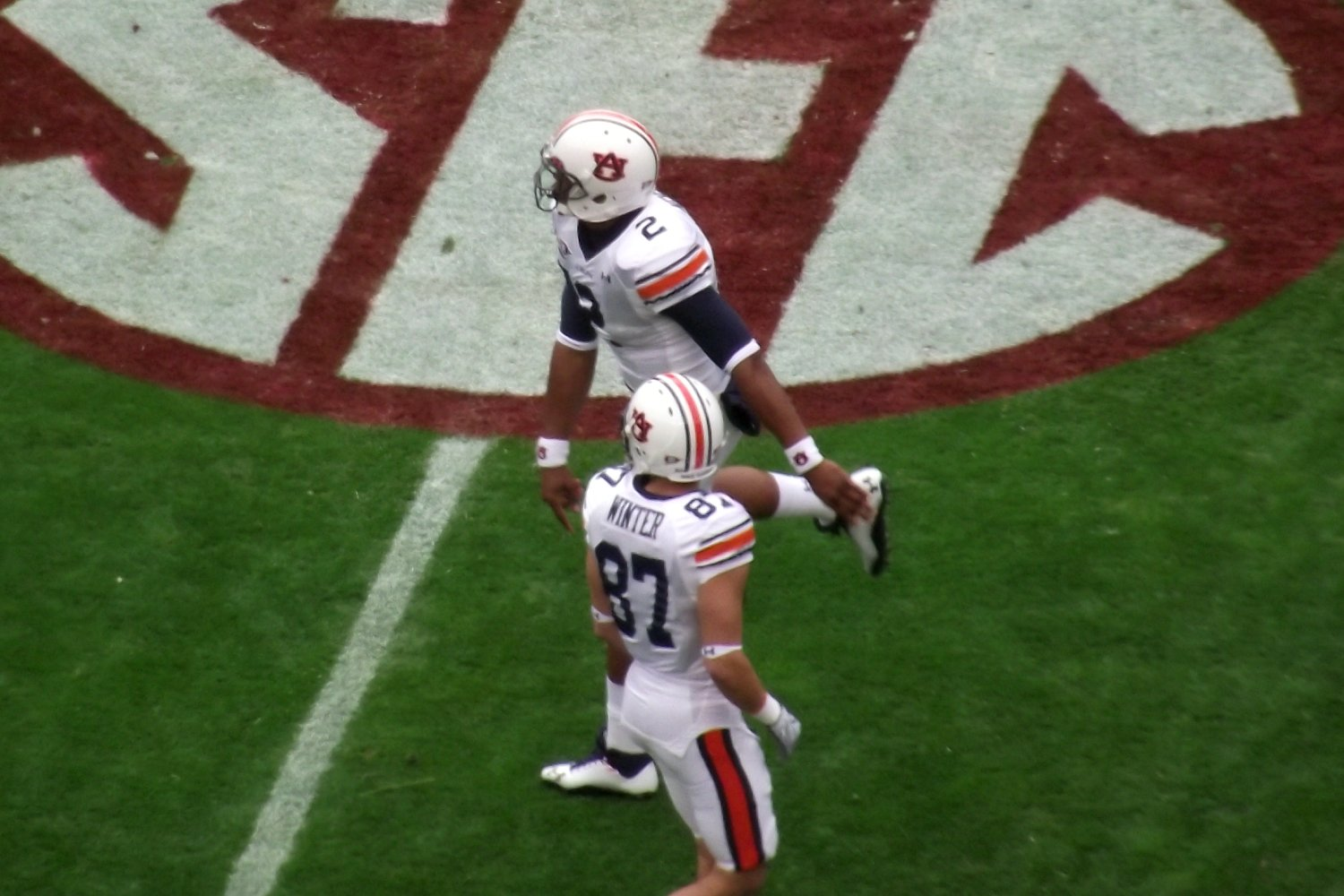
Newton (top) warming up prior to the 2010 Iron Bowl

On October 23, Newton led Auburn to a 24–17 victory over the LSU Tigers. He rushed for a season-high 217 yards in the game, giving him 1,077 yards for the season, and set the SEC record for yards rushing in a season by a quarterback—a record previously held by Auburn quarterback Jimmy Sidle that had stood for over 40 years. After this game, Newton became just the second quarterback to rush for over 1,000 yards in the conference's history. He also broke Pat Sullivan's school record for most touchdowns in a single season, a record that had stood since 1971, with 27. Both of these records were broken on the same play: a 49-yard touchdown run in which Newton escaped two tackles, corrected himself with his arm, eluded two additional tackles, and dragged a defender into the endzone for the touchdown. The play was described as Newton's "Heisman moment". Auburn received its first No. 1 overall BCS ranking, and Newton was listed as the overall favorite for the Heisman. In the following game against Ole Miss, Newton scored on a 20-yard receiving touchdown on a pass from Kodi Burns on a trick play.

By halftime of the game against rival Georgia, Newton became the first SEC player to ever throw for 2,000 yards and rush for 1,000 yards in a single season. With the 49–31 victory, Auburn extended its winning streak to 11–0 and clinched the SEC West, allowing them to play in the SEC Championship game. Newton led Auburn to a 28–27 victory over Alabama in the Iron Bowl after being down 24–0. The 24-point come-from-behind victory was the largest in the program's 117-year history. He passed for 216 yards with three passing touchdowns and ran for another.

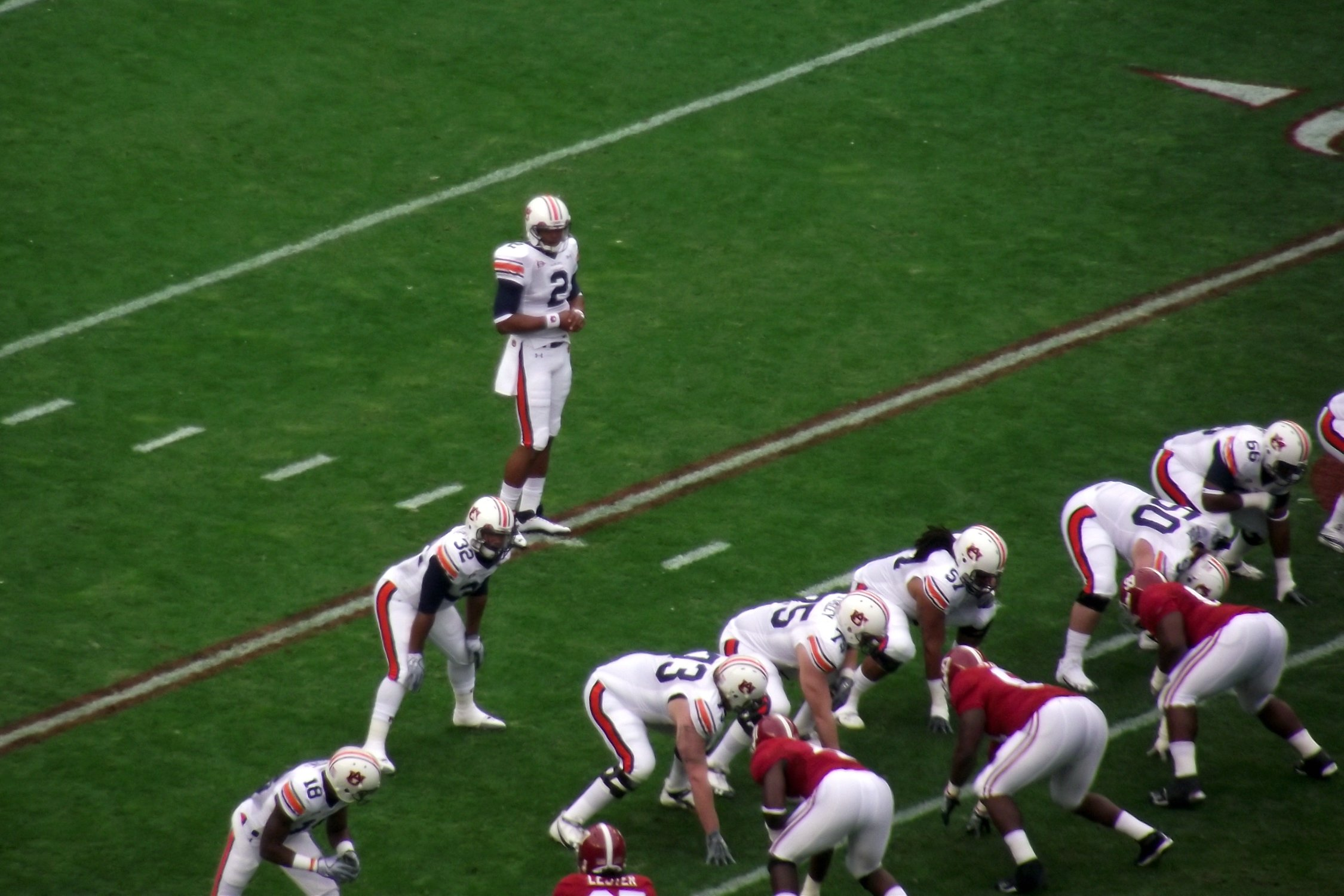
Newton led Auburn back from a 24-point deficit to defeat rival Alabama

On December 4, 2010, Newton led the Tigers to an SEC Championship, their first since 2004, by defeating South Carolina 56–17, setting an SEC Championship Game record for most points scored and largest margin of victory. Newton was named the game MVP after passing for a season-high 335 yards and scoring a career-best six total touchdowns, which were four passing and two rushing. With his performance, Newton also became the third player in NCAA FBS history to throw and run for 20-plus touchdowns in a single season joining former Florida teammate Tim Tebow and Colin Kaepernick, who reached the milestone earlier the same day. Newton was named the 2010 SEC Offensive Player of the Year as well as the 2010 AP Player of the Year. He was one of four finalists for the 2010 Heisman Trophy, which he won in a landslide victory. Newton was the third Auburn player to win the Heisman Trophy (along with Pat Sullivan and Bo Jackson).

Following the victory in the SEC Championship, Auburn was invited to participate in the school's first BCS National Championship Game. The game took place on January 10, 2011, in Glendale, Arizona, with Auburn playing against the Oregon Ducks. In a game that Steve Spurrier predicted to score as high as 60–55, Auburn beat Oregon just 22–19 to win the BCS National Championship. Newton threw for 262 yards, two touchdowns, and one interception. He rushed 22 times for 65 yards, though he lost a fumble that later allowed Oregon to tie the game with limited time remaining. Once Auburn received the ball, Newton drove the Tigers down the field to win the game on Wes Byrum's last-second field goal. Media outlets wrote Newton was upstaged by teammate Michael Dyer, the game's Offensive MVP, and Auburn's defense, which held the high-powered Oregon ground game to just 75 yards. On January 13, three days after winning the BCS National Championship, Newton declared for the 2011 NFL draft, forgoing his senior season. Some sportswriters have argued that Newton's 2010 season is the best single season by a player in NCAA history due to his dominance with relatively little talent around him.

2010 Heisman Trophy Finalist Voting
Finalist	First place votes (3 pts. each)	Second place votes (2 pts. each)	Third place votes (1 pt. each)	Total points
Cam Newton	729	24	28	2,263
Andrew Luck	78	309	227	1,079
LaMichael James	22	313	224	916

==== Eligibility controversy ====
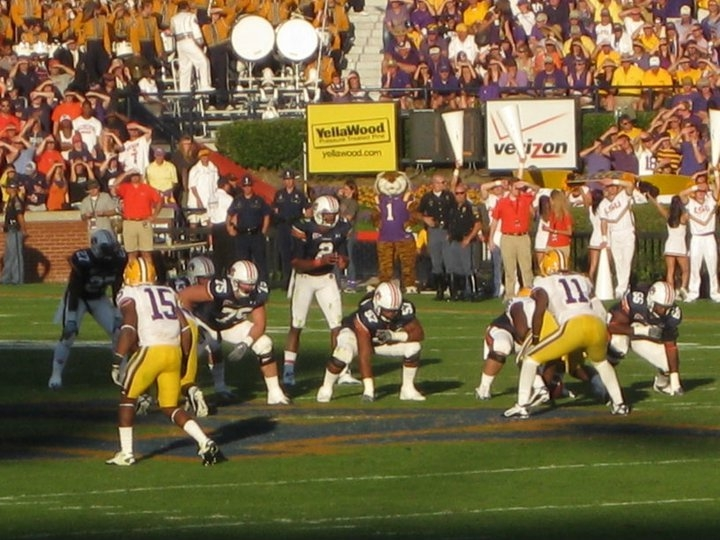
Newton receiving a snap in 2010 against the LSU Tigers

Newton spent much of the second half of the 2010 football season embroiled in a controversy regarding allegations that his father, Cecil Newton, had sought substantial sums of money in return for his son playing for a major college football team, in violation of National Collegiate Athletic Association rules. In early November 2010, several Mississippi State University athletic boosters reported to the media that, during their recruitment of his son out of Blinn College nearly a year earlier, Cecil Newton said that it would take "more than just a scholarship" to secure his son's services. This demand was communicated by booster and former Mississippi State football player Kenny Rogers to fellow boosters and former teammates Bill Bell and John Bond. Rogers said in a Dallas radio interview that Cecil Newton said it would take "anywhere between $100,000 and $180,000" to get his son to transfer to Mississippi State. Auburn maintained throughout the investigation, which had begun several months before the public was made aware of it, that they were not involved in any pay-for-play scheme and that Cam Newton was fully eligible to play.

On November 30, Auburn declared Cam Newton ineligible after the NCAA found evidence that Cecil Newton solicited Mississippi State $120,000 to $180,000 in exchange for Cam Newton's athletic service, a violation of amateurism. Auburn immediately filed to have him reinstated on the basis that Kenny Rogers could not be considered an agent and that Cam Newton was not aware of his father's illegal activity. The NCAA almost immediately sided with Auburn and reinstated Newton the next day on December 1, declaring him eligible for the 2010 SEC Championship Game three days later, stating that there was not sufficient evidence that Cam Newton or anyone from Auburn had any knowledge of Cecil Newton's actions. Auburn subsequently limited the access Cecil Newton had to the program as a result of the NCAA findings. Also, due to increased pressure by the media and the NCAA investigation, Cecil Newton announced he would not attend the Heisman Trophy Ceremony. The NCAA reinstatement did not clear Cecil Newton of any wrongdoing; it did, however, establish Cam Newton's eligibility as a candidate for the Heisman Trophy, which he won in a landslide victory with 2,263 points and 729 first-place votes.

In October 2011, the NCAA officially closed its 13-month investigation into the recruitment of Cam Newton, unable to substantiate any allegation or speculation of illicit recruiting by Auburn, and concluded that Cecil Newton only solicited a cash payment from Mississippi State and no other institution attempting to recruit his son. The investigation, which consisted of over 50 interviews and the reviewing of numerous bank records, IRS documents, telephone records, and e-mail messages, resulted in no findings that would indicate Auburn participated in any pay-for-play scenario in signing Cam Newton. The NCAA said that the allegations failed to "meet a burden of proof, which is a higher standard than rampant public speculation online and in the media" and that the allegations were not "based on credible and persuasive information". The NCAA's Stacey Osburn said "We've done all we can do. We've done all the interviews. We've looked into everything and there's nothing there. Unless something new comes to light that's credible and we need to look at, it's concluded."

== Professional career ==
=== Carolina Panthers (first stint) ===
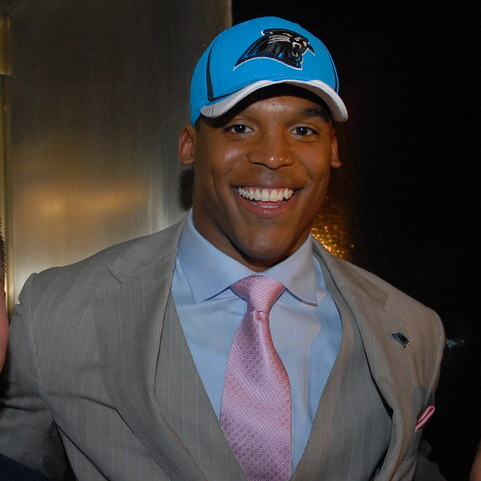
Newton after being selected by the Carolina Panthers in the 2011 NFL draft

In January 2011, Newton began working out with George Whitfield Jr. in San Diego. Whitfield has worked with other quarterbacks such as Ben Roethlisberger and Akili Smith. On April 28, 2011, Newton was selected with the first overall pick in the 2011 NFL draft by the Carolina Panthers. He was the first reigning Heisman Trophy winner to go first overall since Carson Palmer in 2003, in addition to being the first player to win the Heisman, a national championship, and be the top pick in consecution. He also was Auburn's fourth No. 1 selection after Tucker Frederickson (1965), Bo Jackson (1986), and Aundray Bruce (1988). He became Blinn College's fifth player to get drafted and the first in school history to be selected in the first round.

During the 2011 NFL lockout, he worked out for up to 12 hours a day at the IMG Madden Football Academy in Bradenton, Florida, spending up to two hours per day doing one-on-one training with fellow Heisman Trophy winner and ex-Panthers quarterback Chris Weinke.

Before the draft, Panthers owner Jerry Richardson asked Newton to maintain his clean-cut appearance after Newton told Richardson he had no tattoos or piercings and was thinking about growing his hair longer. This gained some controversy on Richardson's part due to the fact that other players on the team didn't meet these guidelines. Dave Zirin, reporter for TheNation.com, even accused Richardson of racism. Despite this, Newton agreed to Richardson's requests and was selected first overall. Newton would eventually start growing his hair out longer after Richardson sold the team to David Tepper.

Pre-draft measurables
Height	Weight	Arm length	Hand span	Wingspan	40-yard dash	10-yard split	20-yard split	20-yard shuttle	Three-cone drill	Vertical jump	Broad jump	Wonderlic
6 ft 5 in (1.96 m)	248 lb (112 kg)	33 3/4 in (0.86 m)	9 7/8 in (0.25 m)	6 ft 9 1/2 in (2.07 m)	4.60 s	1.60 s	2.67 s	4.18 s	6.92 s	35.0 in (0.89 m)	10 ft 6 in (3.20 m)	21
All values from 2011 NFL Scouting Combine

==== 2011 season ====
On July 29, 2011, Newton signed a four-year contract, worth over $22 million, with the Carolina Panthers that was fully guaranteed. After unsuccessfully negotiating with quarterback Jimmy Clausen for the No. 2 jersey Newton wore at Auburn, he decided to keep the No. 1 jersey that the Panthers had assigned him after the draft. His quarterbacks coach was Mike Shula, former head football coach of his college rival Alabama. A month later on September 1, 2011, he was named the Panthers' starting quarterback, ahead of Derek Anderson and Clausen.

In his NFL debut game on September 11, 2011, Newton was 24-of-37 passing for 422 yards, two touchdowns, and one interception, in a 28–21 road loss to the Arizona Cardinals. With a quarterback rating of 110.4, he also rushed for a touchdown, and became the first rookie to throw for at least 400 yards in his first career game. His 422 passing yards broke Peyton Manning's rookie record for most passing yards on opening day.

In his second career game, a 30–23 home loss to the defending Super Bowl champion Green Bay Packers, Newton broke his own record, set the weekend previously, with 432 yards passing, throwing and rushing for a touchdown. Newton's 854 passing yards through the first two games of the season, the most in league history by a rookie, broke the NFL record of 827 set by Kurt Warner in the 2000 season and stood as the most by any quarterback in the first two weeks of the season until New England's Tom Brady broke the mark again later in the day with 940. He also became the only player to begin his career with consecutive 400-yard passing games and broke the Carolina Panthers franchise record of 547 yards previously held by Steve Beuerlein. After Newton's second career game, Packers quarterback Aaron Rodgers commented, "I think someone said in the locker room that I'm kind of glad we played him early in the season because when he figures it out fully, he's going to be even tougher to stop." Newton's three additional interceptions against the Packers tied him for the most interceptions thrown in the league. His total passing yards over the first three games was 1,012 yards.

The Panthers recorded their first victory of the season against the Jacksonville Jaguars 16–10. Newton threw for 158 yards and one touchdown. The Panthers played the Atlanta Falcons, losing 31–17 while passing for 237 yards with no passing touchdowns. Newton increased his team's record to 2–5 with a Week 7 win over the Washington Redskins 33–20. He threw for 256 yards and one touchdown, completing 18 of his 23 passes. He also rushed for 59 yards and a touchdown, including one run for 25 yards. This performance brought Cam a passer rating of 127.5, his highest yet. With Carolina's win over the Indianapolis Colts, Newton became the fourth rookie quarterback to pass for over 3,000 yards in his first season, joining Peyton Manning, Matt Ryan, and Sam Bradford. Newton set the NFL rushing touchdown record for quarterbacks on December 4, 2011, rushing for his 13th touchdown of the season in the fourth quarter against the Tampa Bay Buccaneers breaking the record of Steve Grogan set in 1976. The historic performance was part of a career-high three rushing touchdowns, which were part of a 38–19 win. In that game, he also caught a 27-yard pass from wide receiver Legedu Naanee, making him a triple threat. With his Week 13 performance against the Buccaneers, Newton earned his first NFC Offensive Player of the Week nomination. On December 24, 2011, in a 48–16 victory over the Tampa Bay Buccaneers, Newton threw for 171 yards and three touchdowns and also rushed for 65 yards and a touchdown. In the process, he broke Peyton Manning's record of 3,739 yards passing for a rookie. On January 1, 2012, against the New Orleans Saints, Newton threw for 158 yards and became the first rookie quarterback to throw for 4,000 yards. He finished his rookie season with 4,051 yards, 21 touchdowns, and 17 interceptions. In addition, he rushed 126 times for 706 yards and 14 touchdowns. The 14 rushing touchdowns were an NFL record for rushing touchdowns in a single season by a quarterback. His 706 rushing yards were a rookie record for a single season until Robert Griffin III broke the mark in the next season. Over the course of the season, when Newton had a turnover, the team was 0–10; when he had no turnovers, the team went 6–0.

On January 22, 2012, Newton was named to be heading to the Pro Bowl after the New York Giants beat the San Francisco 49ers in the NFC Championship. Because Eli Manning was one of the three quarterbacks for the NFC to be selected, and with Newton being picked as the NFC alternate later in December, Newton was able to play in the Pro Bowl with Manning headed to the Super Bowl. He finished the Pro Bowl with 186 yards along with two touchdowns and three interceptions. Newton was named both AP Offensive Rookie of the Year and Pepsi NFL Rookie of the Year on February 4, 2012. He became the second straight number one pick to win the AP Rookie of the Year, after Sam Bradford won it the previous season. He was also the first Panther to win the Offensive award, but the second Panthers rookie of the year, following Julius Peppers, the AP Defensive Rookie of the Year in 2002. Cam received his Offensive Rookie of the Year, and Pepsi NFL Rookie of the Year awards on the inaugural NFL Honors award show, with 47 of the 50 possible 50 AP votes (the other 3 going to Andy Dalton). He was named to the PFWA All-Rookie Team, becoming the third Panthers quarterback to claim this award, joining Kerry Collins (1995) & Chris Weinke (2001). He also landed the number 5 and 2 play of the year with his 49-yard touchdown run against the Buccaneers (5), and his touchdown fumblerooski to Richie Brockel against the Houston Texans. He earned the nickname Superman due to his touchdown celebration. Newton was rated as the 40th best player in the NFL by his peers on the NFL Top 100 player list. His rookie season was when he started the Carolina Panther tradition "Sunday Giveaway", where the Panthers offensive players typically give away the football that they just scored a touchdown with to kids in the stands.

==== 2012 season ====
Newton started his second professional season with 303 passing yards, one touchdown, and two interceptions in the 16–10 loss to the Tampa Bay Buccaneers. After helping lead the team to a 35–27 victory over New Orleans in Week 2, Newton and the Panthers went on a five-game losing streak. In the last game of the losing streak, Newton threw for a season-high 314 passing yards but had two interceptions in the 23–22 loss to the Chicago Bears. The Panthers went on to lose three of their next five games to sit at 3–9. At the end of that stretch was one of Newton's more efficient games of the season. In Week 12, against the Philadelphia Eagles, he passed for 306 yards and two passing touchdowns to go along with two rushing touchdowns in the 30–22 victory to earn NFC Offensive Player of the Week. Against the Kansas City Chiefs in Week 13, he had 232 passing yards and three passing touchdowns to go along with 78 rushing yards in the 27–21 loss. In Week 14, a 30–20 victory over the Atlanta Falcons, he had a career-high 116 rushing yards and a rushing touchdown to go along with 287 passing yards and two passing touchdowns. The victory over the Falcons was the start of a four-game winning streak to end the season. However, the rough first half of the season was too much to overcome for the team.

He finished his second professional season with 3,869 passing yards, 19 passing touchdowns, 12 interceptions, 741 rushing yards, and eight rushing touchdowns. The Panthers finished the season at 7–9. Though this season could be seen by some as a "Sophomore Slump," he did improve in many statistical categories, improved on his efficiency, and cut back on his turnovers. Cam's noticeable decline in rushing touchdowns was due partially to the Panthers signing Mike Tolbert before the season began. Tolbert, a versatile fullback, recorded seven rushing touchdowns on the season. Newton led the league in Yards Per Completion (13.8) and was tied for second with Peyton Manning in Yards Per Attempt (8.0) behind Robert Griffin III. Newton was rated as the 46th best player by his peers on the NFL Top 100 Players of 2013 list.

==== 2013 season ====
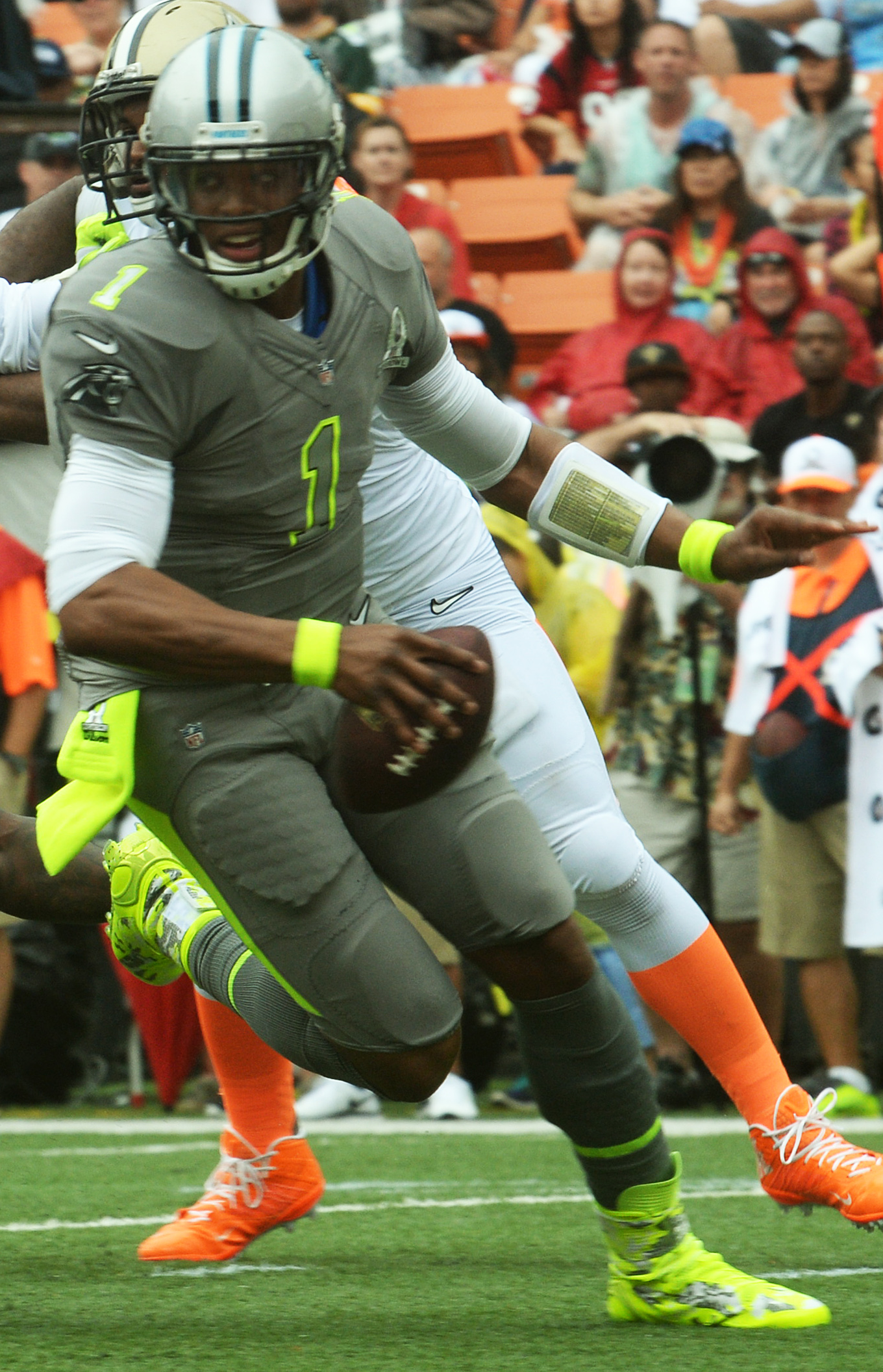
Newton in the 2014 Pro Bowl

The 2013 season started rough for Newton and the Panthers with a 1–3 start. The Panthers went on an eight-game winning streak starting in Week 5. Newton was consistent in that stretch, passing for 216.4 yards per game, 13 passing touchdowns, and six interceptions to go along with 62 carries for 324 rushing yards and five rushing touchdowns. The Panthers' winning streak ended in a 31–13 loss to the New Orleans Saints in Week 14. They won the last three games to finish with a 12–4 record and earn a first round bye in the playoffs.

In the regular season, he recorded 3,379 passing yards, 24 touchdowns, 13 interceptions, 585 rushing yards, and six rushing touchdowns. Newton was selected for the 2014 Pro Bowl. The week after, he lost his first NFL playoff game to the San Francisco 49ers in the Divisional Round. In the 23–10 loss, he had 267 passing yards, one touchdown, and two interceptions to go along with 54 rushing yards. Newton was drafted third in the first annual Pro Bowl Draft, by Team Sanders. Newton was rated as the 24th best player on the NFL Top 100 Players of 2014 list.

==== 2014 season ====
On March 21, 2014, Newton underwent surgery to "tighten" up his ankle ligaments, which Newton admitted he had dealt with since his college days at Auburn University. The estimated recovery time was four months, which caused him to miss training camp and the first preseason game. During the third preseason game against the New England Patriots, Newton sustained a hairline fracture on his ribs after a hit from Jamie Collins. Newton's streak of starting 48 consecutive games was snapped during the Panthers opening game 20–14 victory over the Tampa Bay Buccaneers. Newton made his debut during Carolina Panthers home opener against the Detroit Lions in Week 2. He recorded 300 yards of offense with a touchdown, no turnovers, and a 100.2 quarterback rating en route to a 24–7 victory.

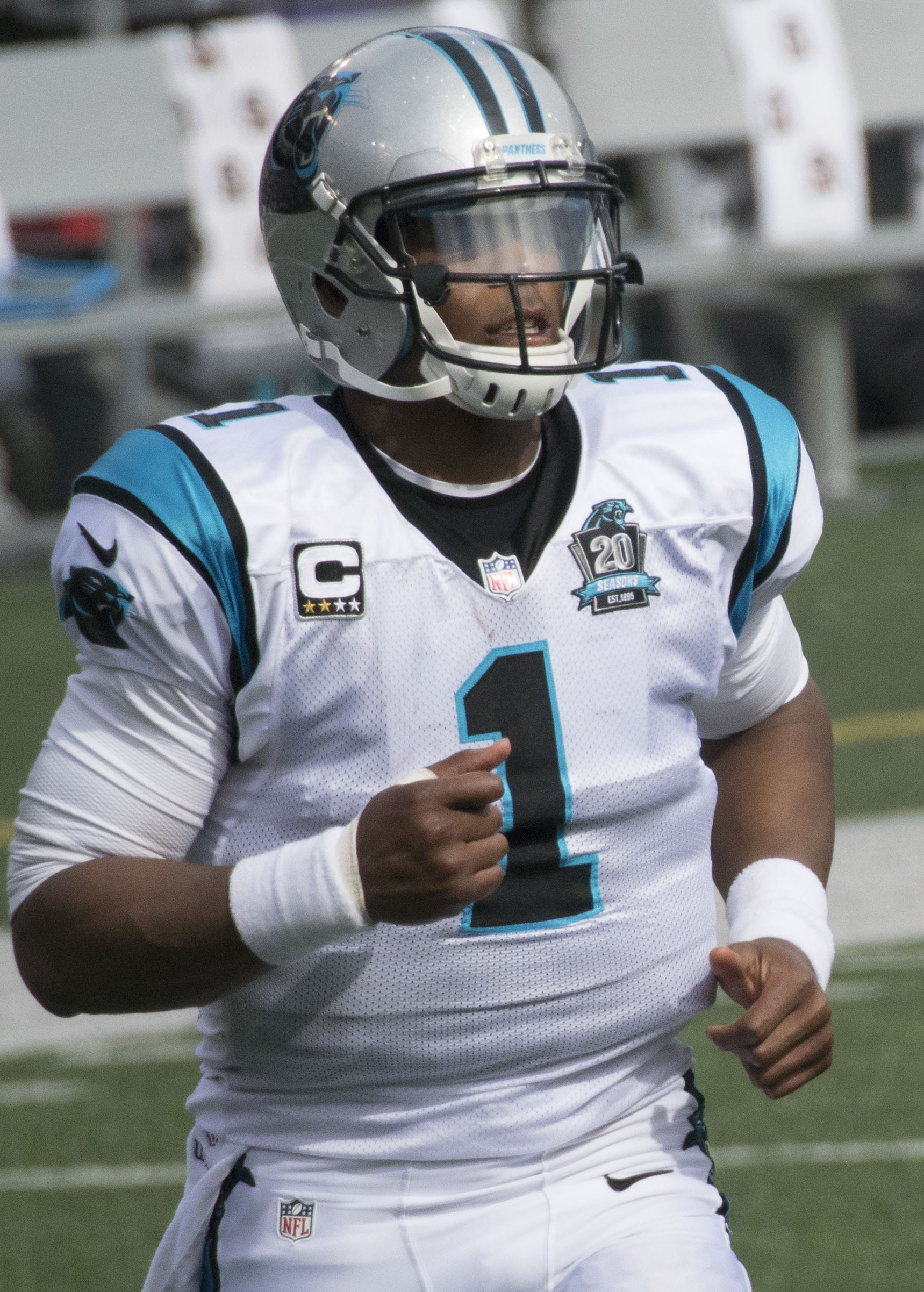
Newton in 2014 in Baltimore

Through his first three starts in the season, Newton recorded a 110.8 quarterback rating against the blitz. During the Panthers Week 5 victory against the Chicago Bears, Newton led the Panthers from a 14-point deficit and was named to the Pro Football Focus (PFF) Team of the Week for his performance. Senior producer of NFL Films Greg Cosell and respected Football Outsiders columnist and Pre Snap Reads owner, Cian Fahey, both noted Newton's clear development and growth as a pocket passer. During the Panthers Week 6 37–37 tie against the Cincinnati Bengals, Newton accounted for 91% of the offense, recording a career-high 29 of 46 completions for 286 yards with two touchdowns and an interception along with 17 rushing attempts for 107 yards and a rushing touchdown, the most since the 2012 Week 14 win against Atlanta, when he had 116 on nine carries. Through the first six games in the season, Newton averaged 2.53 seconds to attempt a pass (2.73 in 2013) and has had the ball out in under 2.5 seconds on 51.8% of his drop-backs (40% in 2013).

Newton had arguably his best game of the season in a 41–10 victory over the New Orleans Saints. Newton completed 21 of 33 passes for 226 yards and three touchdowns. Along with that he had 83 rushing yards and one rushing touchdown. He was named NFC Offensive Player of the Week for his efforts in that game and with this performance, Newton has had four games with at least 200 passing yards and 80 rushing yards with multiple touchdown passes and a rushing touchdown. That is the most such games in NFL history. Two days following the Saints game, Newton was involved in a well-publicized car crash in which he fractured two vertebrae in his lower back. He missed only one game and returned to the field a week later in a match against the Cleveland Browns to make the final end-of-season push to win the NFC South division and once again make the playoffs.

Newton led the Panthers to the first back-to-back division titles in the NFC South since the formation of the division and became the first quarterback since Michael Vick and Randall Cunningham as the only quarterbacks in NFL history with four seasons with at least 500 rushing yards. During the season, Newton also tied John Elway, Otto Graham, and Y. A. Tittle for 10th all-time in rushing touchdowns in the regular season by a quarterback with 33. Further, with his four victories in December, Newton ranked second in the NFL in December wins over the past four years with 14 only behind Tom Brady. Newton's 33 rushing touchdowns were the most by a quarterback in his first four seasons. He is also the only player in NFL history to have 10,000 passing yards and 2,000 rushing yards in his first four seasons and the first to have at least 3,000 passing yards and 500 rushing yards in four consecutive seasons.

The following week, Newton led the Panthers to their first playoff win in nine years in the Wild Card Round over the Arizona Cardinals, throwing for 198 yards and two touchdowns while running for 35 yards. Newton and the Panthers were defeated by the Seattle Seahawks 31–17 in the Divisional Round. Newton was 23–36 for 245 yards with two touchdowns, two interceptions, and 37 rushing yards. Despite missing two games and dealing with ankle, rib, throwing hand, and back injuries through the entire season, Newton was rated as the 73rd best player in the NFL on the NFL Top 100 Players of 2015.

==== 2015 season: MVP season and Super Bowl 50 appearance ====
On June 2, 2015, the Panthers and Newton agreed to a five-year, $103.8 million contract extension. Through the 2015 preseason, Newton graded as PFF's best quarterback. During the season-opener against the Jacksonville Jaguars, Newton finished with 175 yards passing, one touchdown, and one interception, while rushing for 35 yards. This was the first NFL opening-day victory for Newton (the Panthers won their opener in 2014 with an injured Newton on the sidelines). During the Panthers' Week 2 victory over the Houston Texans, Newton finished with 195 yards passing, two passing touchdowns, and one interception, while rushing for 76 yards and one touchdown. In week three against the New Orleans Saints, Newton passed for 315 yards and two passing touchdowns to go along with a rushing touchdown. It marked the 26th game in Newton's career in which he had a passing and a rushing touchdown, ranking second all-time in NFL history behind only Steve Young (31). Further, it marked the 14th time in his career where Newton notched two-plus touchdown passes and at least one rushing touchdown, third-most in the NFL since 1960, behind only Steve Young (17) and Fran Tarkenton (16). Through the first three games of the season, Newton accounted for 76% of the total offensive yards and 88% of the total touchdowns the Panthers generated. Newton helped lead the Panthers to a 3–0 start, the first time they had done so since the 2003 NFL season. Several experts noted Newton's continued growth as a quarterback; Gil Brandt noted Newton's improving internal clock in the pocket, citing his career low sack percentage of 4.8% in the early season; senior NFL columnist for CBSSports.com, Pete Prisco, noting Cam's improved pocket patience, mechanics, and ability to read defenses; Cian Fahey noted Newton's development into a refined pocket passer with the athleticism to diversify any offense with a multidimensional run game. In the following week, during a 37–23 victory over the Tampa Bay Buccaneers, Newton went 11 of 22 passing for 124 yards and two touchdowns while leading the team in rushing with 51 yards to give the Panthers a 4–0 record for the first time since 2003. As a rusher, through the first four weeks, Newton ranked third in the NFL in rushes for first downs.

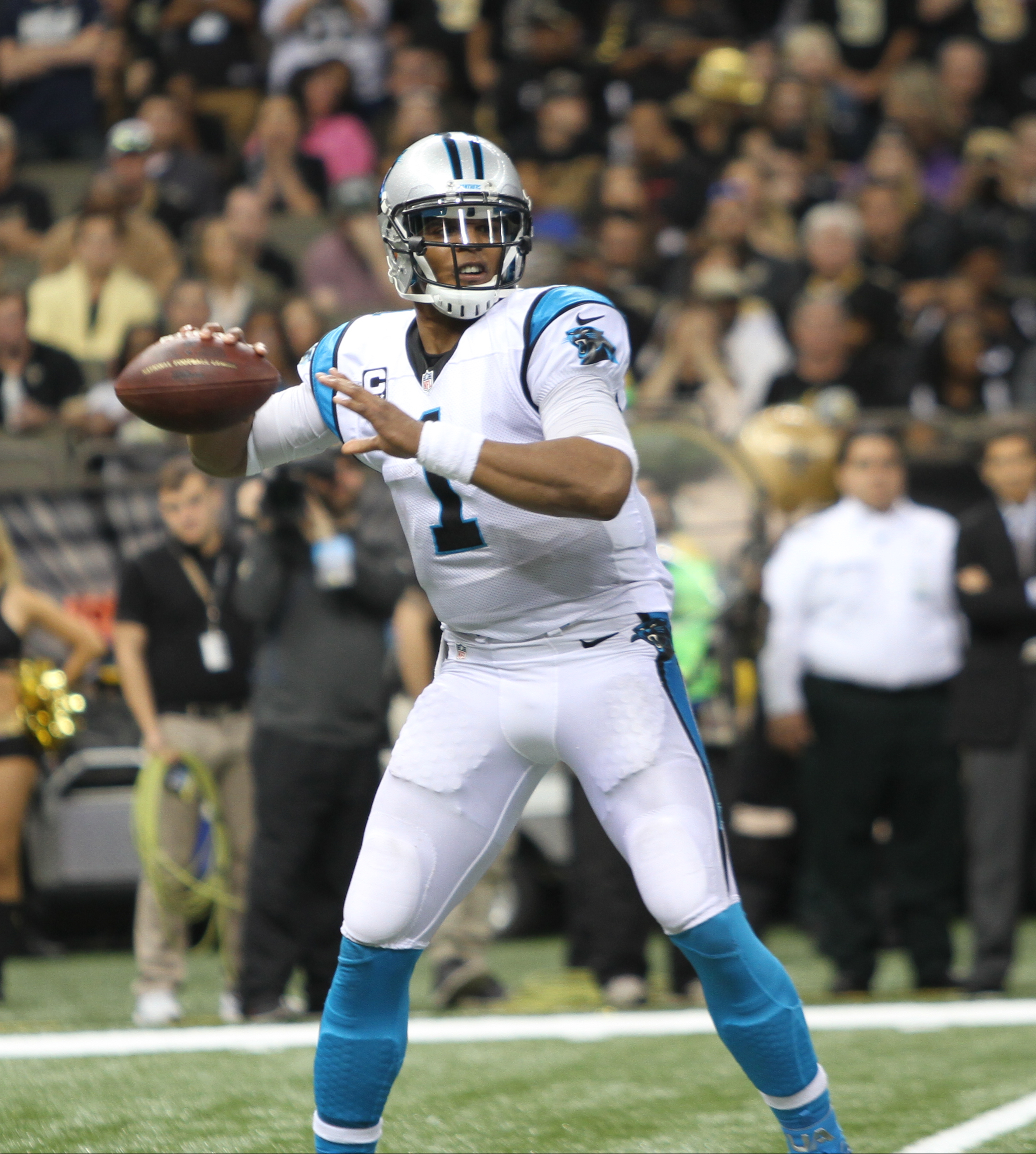
Newton playing against the Saints in 2015

Following a Week 4 bye, Newton threw for 269 yards, two interceptions, and a touchdown and rushed for 30 yards and a touchdown while leading the Panthers to victory against the Seattle Seahawks. It marked just the 3rd home Seahawks loss in the Russell Wilson era. It also marked the first franchise win in Seattle and Newton's ninth career fourth-quarter comeback win. During the game, Newton also recorded the 36th career rushing touchdown of his career; over that span, Marshawn Lynch and Adrian Peterson were the only players to record more rushing touchdowns since 2011. Through the first five weeks of the season, Newton recorded a career-high 67.6% of passes under pressure. The following week against the Philadelphia Eagles, Newton led the Panthers to a victory, earning the Panthers their first 6–0 record in franchise history; during the game, he threw three interceptions and recorded his 28th game with a rushing touchdown and a passing touchdown. In Week 8, against the Indianapolis Colts, Newton threw for 248 yards, two touchdowns, and one interception, as the Panthers moved to 7–0 with a 29–26 overtime victory; with the win, Newton became the first quarterback in NFL history to earn a comeback victory with his team trailing in overtime.

The following week, Newton led the Panthers to their first 8–0 start in franchise history with a 37–29 victory over the Green Bay Packers; Newton went 15–30 for 297 yards passing, three touchdowns, and one interception to go along with 9 rush, 57 yards, and one touchdown. Further, for the first time in his career, Newton threw for 200 yards and three touchdowns in a single half. For his game against the Packers, Newton was named the NFC Offensive Player of the Week. The following week, during the Panthers 27–10 victory over the Tennessee Titans, Newton went 21 for 26 passes for 217 yards and 1 passing touchdown while recording 9 rushes for 23 yards and 1 rushing touchdown. Newton began the game with 11 straight completions, tying his career best in a single game (vs. Bucs on 11/18/12). The following week, Newton led the Panthers to a 44–16 victory over the Washington Redskins. During the game, Newton threw for a career-high five touchdown passes and became the only quarterback in NFL history with 100+ passing touchdowns and 25+ rushing touchdowns in his first five seasons. For his efforts, Newton was named the NFC Offensive Player of the Week for the second time this season. During the Panthers 33–14 victory over the Dallas Cowboys on Thanksgiving, Newton completed 16-of-27 passes for 183 yards, including going 8-of-16 on third downs, and rushed 12 times for 45 yards and a touchdown. During the Panthers 41–38 victory over the Saints, Newton finished with 380 combined passing and rushing yards and five touchdown passes. He was 10 of 14 for 154 yards and two touchdowns. He led the game-winning 75-yard touchdown drive to the Panthers undefeated through their first 12 games. For his performance, Newton was named NFC Offensive Player of the week for the third time in five weeks. The last time a player achieved that feat was 2007, when Tom Brady of the New England Patriots won three player of the week awards in five weeks while quarterbacking the Patriots during an undefeated regular season. The following week, during the Panthers 38–0 victory over the Atlanta Falcons, Newton completed 15 of 21 passes for 265 yards, 3 passing touchdowns, and finished with a career-high quarterback rating of 153.3. The Panthers amassed 225 yards of offense in just the first quarter of the game, a franchise record. During the Panthers' thrilling 38–35 victory against the New York Giants, Newton went 25 of 45 for 340 yards and 5 passing touchdowns while adding 8 rushes for 100 yards, his third career game with at least 100 rushing yards. Newton also led the Panthers on his 12th-ever game-winning drive, and his fourth of the season. For his efforts, Newton was again named the NFC Offensive Player of the Week. Newton became the NFL's first player to win the award four times in a seven-week span since San Diego's LaDainian Tomlinson in 2006.

Through the first 15 weeks of the NFL season, Newton led the Panthers to a 14–0 record. During that span, he also threw the second-most touchdown passes and led the NFL with 40 combined passing and rushing touchdowns. Newton was on the field for 660 of Carolina's 923 plays in which he was either the decision-maker or ball carrier after the snap, which accounted for 72 percent of the Panthers' total snaps. Further, Newton had the second-lowest percentage of passing yards gained after the catch among NFL quarterbacks and 40 of Carolina's 49 touchdowns this season were either thrown or run by Newton.

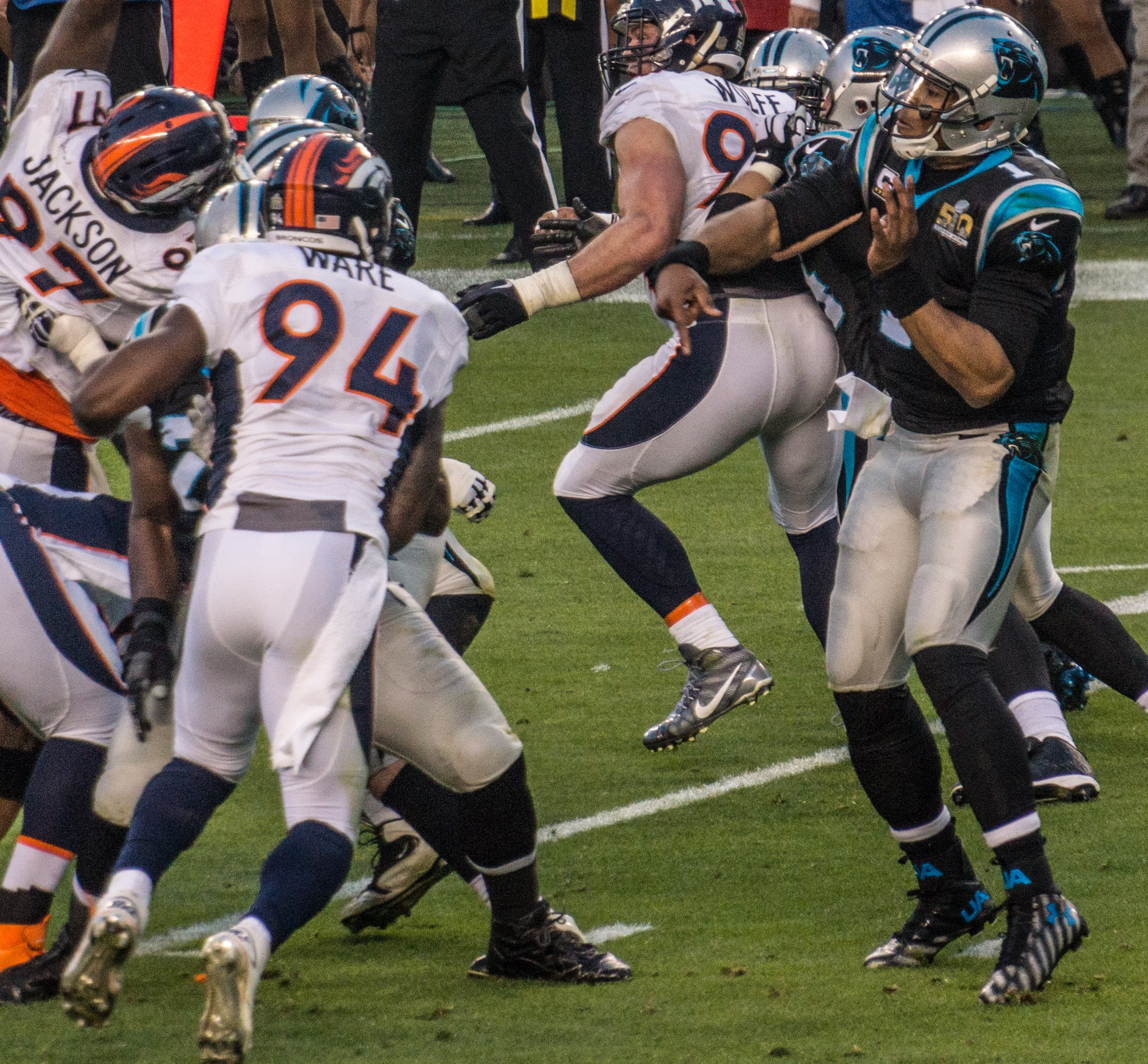
Newton in Super Bowl 50 against the Denver Broncos

The Panthers had their first setback in the 20–13 away loss to the Atlanta Falcons in their second divisional matchup. In the loss, Newton was 17 of 30 for 142 yards. In a 38–10 win over the Buccaneers during the regular-season finale, Newton tied his season-best completion percentage (80.8), threw for almost 300 yards and added a pair of touchdowns and had his first game with two rushing touchdowns since Week 12 of the 2012 season. His passer rating of 139.3 was the second-best mark he posted all season. For his efforts, he was named the NFC Offensive Player of the Week for the fifth time in the season. Newton became the first player to win five NFC Offensive Player of the Week awards in a nine-week span within a season and his five awards tied for the most in a season in NFL history (Tom Brady, 2007). Cam Newton led NFL quarterbacks in rushing attempts, rushing yards, and rushing touchdowns in 2015. Newton's 45 total touchdowns during the regular season marked the most touchdowns by a single player since 2013. Newton was selected as the 2015 NFL MVP and Offensive Player of the Year by the PFWA.

Newton and the Panthers finished the season with a 15–1 record, a franchise best, and earned a first-round bye in the playoffs. They defeated the Seattle Seahawks in the Divisional Round by a score of 31–24, despite nearly blowing a 31–0 lead, and went on to defeat the Arizona Cardinals 49–15 in the NFC Championship game to face the Broncos in Super Bowl 50. In the game, Newton completed 19 of 28 passes for 335 yards, with two touchdowns and one interception. In addition, he rushed 10 times for 47 yards and two touchdowns. He became the first quarterback in NFL history to rush for multiple touchdowns in a single NFC Championship. The Panthers' 49 points were the most in the history of the NFC Championship.

On February 6, 2016, Newton was named NFL MVP. Newton was the second African-American quarterback to receive the honor after Steve McNair in 2003 and the first sole recipient as McNair shared his award with Peyton Manning, who Newton would go on to face in the Super Bowl. Newton earned First-team All-Pro honors and his third Pro Bowl nomination. In Super Bowl 50 on February 7, 2016, which pitted the Panthers' top-ranked offense against the Broncos' top-ranked defense, the Panthers lost by a score of 24–10. The game was generally a one-score affair until a few minutes left in the fourth quarter. The defense of both teams performed extremely well and led to both offenses struggling terribly throughout the game. Newton was sacked six times and Manning was sacked five times, both quarterbacks fumbled twice, and both threw an interception. Newton's two fumbles were pivotal moments as the first fumble was from a strip-sack from Von Miller and led to the Broncos' first touchdown and the second was forced by Miller late in the fourth quarter with the Panthers needing only 6 points to tie the game leaving Newton in prime position to recover the football. Newton controversially hesitated to dive on the football (later citing injury concerns) allowing the Broncos to recover the football with a first-and-goal on their eventual game-clinching touchdown.

Newton was ranked as the top player in the NFL by his peers on the NFL Top 100 Players of 2016. For the season, Newton sold the 7th-most merchandise from March 2015 to February 2016.

==== 2016 season ====
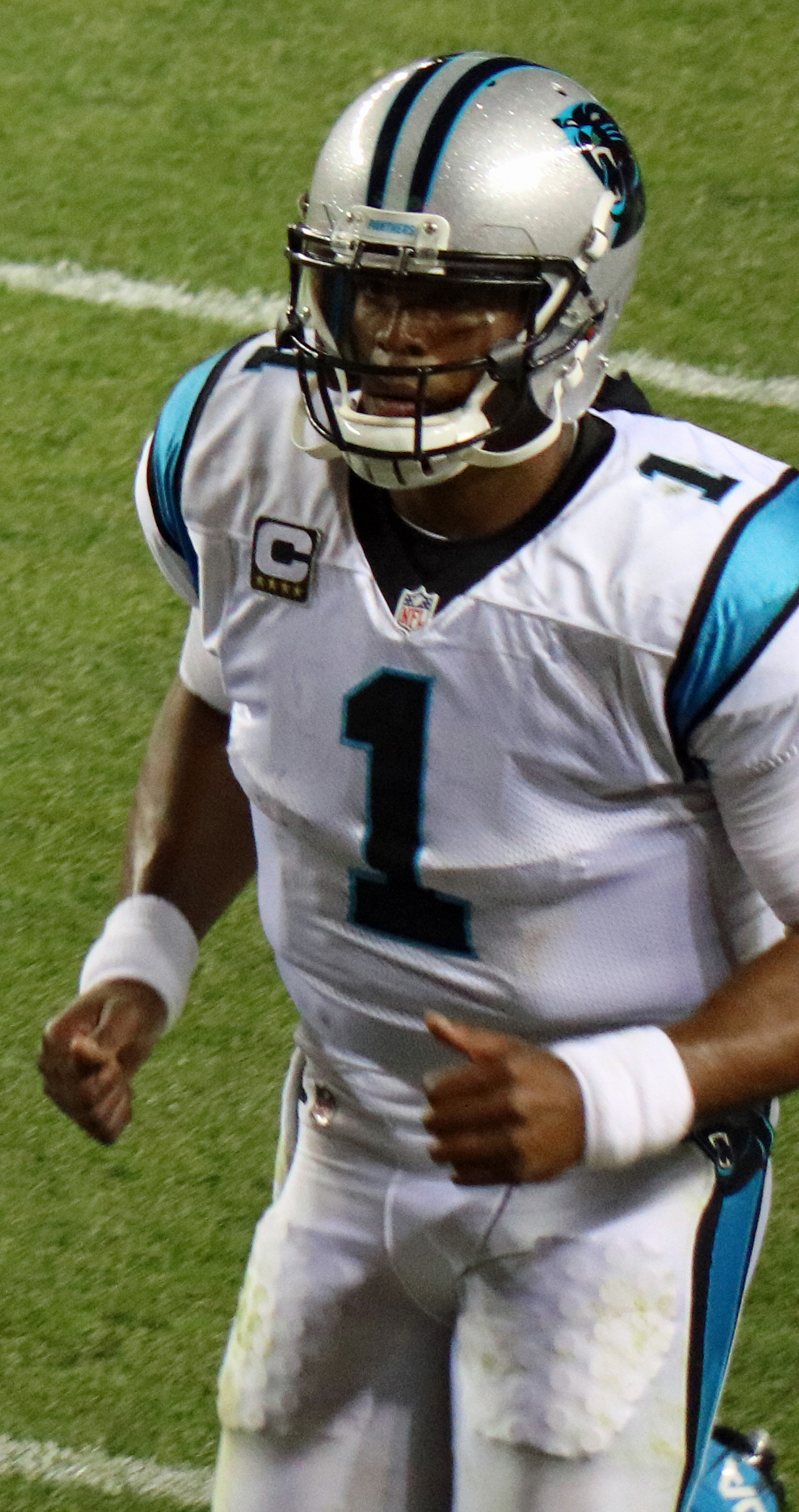
Newton in 2016 in Denver

In the opening game of the 2016 season against the Denver Broncos, Newton surpassed two of Steve Young's NFL records, one for the most career rushing touchdowns by a quarterback, with his 44th, and the other for most games with a passing and rushing touchdown, with his 32nd. This also tied Otto Graham's all-time professional American football mark of 44 rushing touchdowns by a quarterback. He passed for 194 yards, one passing touchdown, and one interception to go along with 11 carries for 54 rushing yards and a rushing touchdown in the 21–20 loss. In the next game, a 46–27 victory over the San Francisco 49ers, he had 353 passing yards, four passing touchdowns, and one interception. On October 2, in a 48–33 loss at the Atlanta Falcons in Week 4, Newton suffered a concussion on a two-point conversion run and missed the rest of the game. Newton missed the next game against the Tampa Bay Buccaneers. On December 4, against the Seattle Seahawks, Newton was benched for the first offensive series for a dress code violation. It was Newton's first professional game, other than his first career preseason game in 2011, in which he began the game as the backup.

For the 2016 season, Newton completed 52.9 percent of his passes, marking a career worst in that category. He threw 19 touchdown passes, 16 fewer than the previous year, and 14 interceptions, the second most of his career behind his rookie season. The Panthers regressed from their 15–1 record from the previous year to a 6–10 record in 2016. Despite a down 2016 season, Newton was still ranked 44th by his peers on the NFL Top 100 Players of 2017.

==== 2017 season ====
On March 30, Newton had surgery to repair a partially torn rotator cuff on his throwing shoulder.

During a press conference on October 4, Newton was asked a question by Jourdan Rodrigue, a female sportswriter for The Charlotte Observer, regarding passing routes. Newton smirked and said, "It's funny to hear a female talk about routes." Then he answered her question. His remarks were viewed as sexist by Rodrigue as well as many in the media. It later surfaced that Rodrigue had previously mocked Newton using a Twitter account with which she had also posted racist comments, causing the publication BlackSportsOnline.com to label her a hypocrite. The following day, yogurt company Dannon dropped Newton as a sponsor. Newton uploaded a video to Twitter later that day in which he apologized for his remarks. During Monday Night Football against the Miami Dolphins in Week 10, Newton threw for 254 yards and rushed for 95 yards with four total touchdowns. The Panthers combined for 294 rushing yards and 548 total yards of offense as the Panthers won 45–21. His performance in Week 10 earned him NFC Offensive Player of the Week. He finished the regular season with 3,302 passing yards, 22 touchdowns, 16 interceptions and a career-high 754 rushing yards to go along with six rushing touchdowns. The Panthers made the playoffs as the #5-seed. In the Wild Card Round against the New Orleans Saints, he threw for 24–40, for 349 total yards and two touchdowns as the Panthers lost with a score of 31–26. The Panthers made it to the Saints' 21-yard line on their final drive in the fourth quarter but turned the ball over on downs. Newton was ranked 25th by his peers on the NFL Top 100 Players of 2018.

==== 2018–19: Injury-shortened seasons ====
After a 16–8 victory over the Dallas Cowboys in Week 1 of the 2018 season, Newton went 32 of 45 passing, 335 passing yards, three touchdowns, and an interception to go along with 42 rushing yards in the 31–24 loss to the Atlanta Falcons. The next week, he passed for two touchdowns and ran for two touchdowns in the 31–21 victory over the Cincinnati Bengals. In Week 7 against the Philadelphia Eagles, after being down 17–0 in the fourth quarter, Newton completed 16 of 22 passes for 201 yards and two touchdowns in the final quarter as the Panthers defeated the Eagles 21–17, earning him NFC Offensive Player of the Week.

Newton and the Panthers began struggling in the month of November. After the Panthers lost to the New Orleans Saints in Week 15, which was their sixth straight loss after starting 6–2, Newton acknowledged a nagging shoulder injury that had been hampering his play during the losing streak, and hinted that the team would deactivate him for the final two games of the season in order to heal. On January 24, 2019, Newton underwent right shoulder surgery.

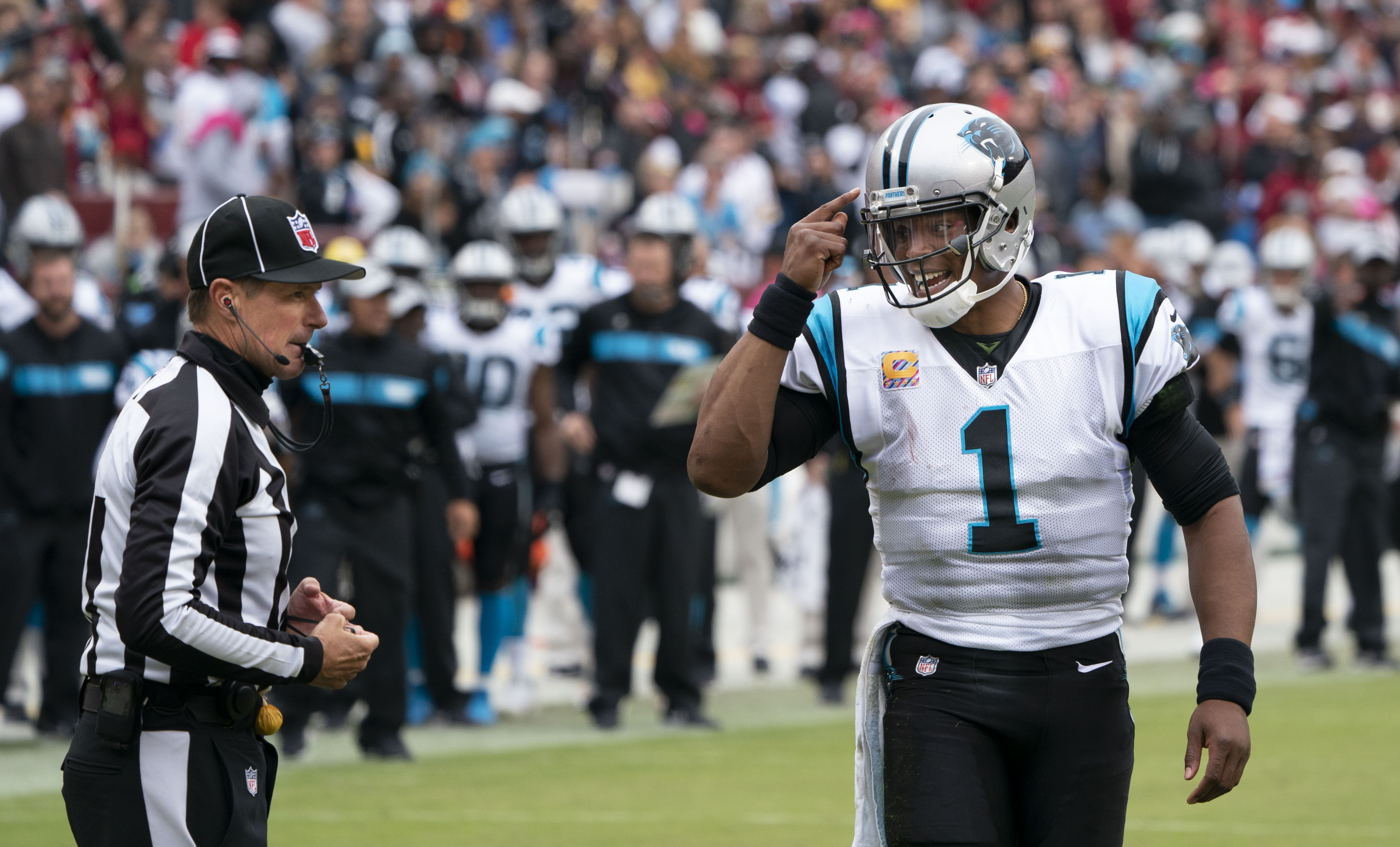
Newton in 2018

In a poll orchestrated by writers from The Athletic, Newton was voted the most underrated quarterback in the league by 85 defensive players from 25 teams. He was ranked 87th by his fellow players on the NFL Top 100 Players of 2019.

Newton made his return from injury in Week 1 of the following season against the Los Angeles Rams. In the game, Newton passed for 239 yards and one interception as the Panthers lost 30–27. In Week 2 against the Tampa Bay Buccaneers on Thursday Night Football, Newton completed 25 passes out of 51 attempts for 333 yards as the Panthers lost 20–14. After the game, Newton said "All fingers are pointed back to the offense and me specifically." Newton was held out of the week 3 game against the Arizona Cardinals due to injury, and it was later revealed that he had a Lisfranc fracture, which he later confirmed in a YouTube vlog. On November 5, the Panthers placed Newton on injured reserve as the injury was healing slower than expected.

On March 17, 2020, the Panthers announced they had given Newton permission to seek a trade. However, on March 24, after failing to find a trade partner, the team announced they had officially released Newton.

=== New England Patriots ===
After nearly three months in free agency, Newton signed a one-year deal with the New England Patriots on July 8, 2020. The contract included a base salary of $1.05 million, the minimum salary for a player with his amount of experience, and a maximum value of $7.5 million, including incentives and playing time bonuses. Newton was the first successor to 20-year veteran Tom Brady, who left New England in free agency. He was named starting quarterback and team captain of the Patriots on September 3, beating out veteran Brian Hoyer and second-year Jarrett Stidham, which made him the team's first new primary starter since 2002.

In his first career start with the Patriots, a Week 1 game at home against the Miami Dolphins, Newton led the team to a 21–11 victory, completing 15 of 19 passes for 155 yards with no touchdowns or interceptions while carrying the ball 15 times for 75 yards and two rushing touchdowns. After the game ended, Newton was involved in a scuffle with Dolphins defensive lineman Christian Wilkins and nose tackle Raekwon Davis, the latter of whom attempted to remove a chain from Newton's neck. During Week 2 against the Seattle Seahawks on Sunday Night Football, Newton finished with 397 passing yards, 47 rushing yards, one passing touchdown, an interception, and two rushing touchdowns. At the end of the game, with the Patriots trailing 35–30, Newton attempted to run into the end zone from the one-yard line, but was stopped short, resulting in a Patriots loss.

On October 3, 2020, a day before the team's Week 4 matchup against the Chiefs, Newton tested positive for COVID-19 and the team placed him on the reserve/COVID-19 list, which ultimately postponed the game by one day. He was activated from the list on October 14. In Week 9, in a 30–27 victory over the New York Jets on Monday Night Football, Newton passed for 274 yards and had two rushing touchdowns. The performance marked the third time in the 2020 season that Newton had rushed for two touchdowns in one game, matching his career-high of three such games in his rookie season in 2011.

In Week 11 against the Houston Texans, Newton threw for 365 yards and a touchdown during the 27–20 loss. In Week 12 against the Arizona Cardinals, Newton threw for a season-low 84 yards and two interceptions during the 20–17 win. In Week 13 against the Los Angeles Chargers, Newton threw for only 69 yards and a touchdown, but rushed for 48 yards and two more touchdowns during the 45–0 win. In Week 16 against the Buffalo Bills on Monday Night Football, Newton threw for 34 yards and rushed for 24 yards and a touchdown before being benched in favor of Jarrett Stidham in the third quarter during the 38–9 loss. In Week 17, against the New York Jets, he had 242 passing yards and three touchdowns to go along with his first career touchdown reception on a trick play where Jakobi Meyers threw to him during the 28–14 win.

Newton finished the season with a league-high 12 quarterback rushing touchdowns, the second-highest in a season behind his 14 in 2011. However, Newton threw for 2,657 yards and eight touchdowns, which were the lowest outside of his injury-shortened 2019 campaign.

On March 12, 2021, the Patriots re-signed Newton to a one-year deal worth up to $13.6 million. In training camp, he competed with rookie first-round draft pick Mac Jones. On August 21, he traveled to an appointment outside of the New England area. Despite multiple negative tests for COVID-19, he was required to stay away from the team facility for five days. This caused him to miss four days of practice prior to their preseason game. He did, however, participate virtually in the practices. Newton was able to return to the team in time for all three preseason games, which he did play in. On August 31, Newton was released from the Patriots during final roster cuts.

=== Carolina Panthers (second stint) ===
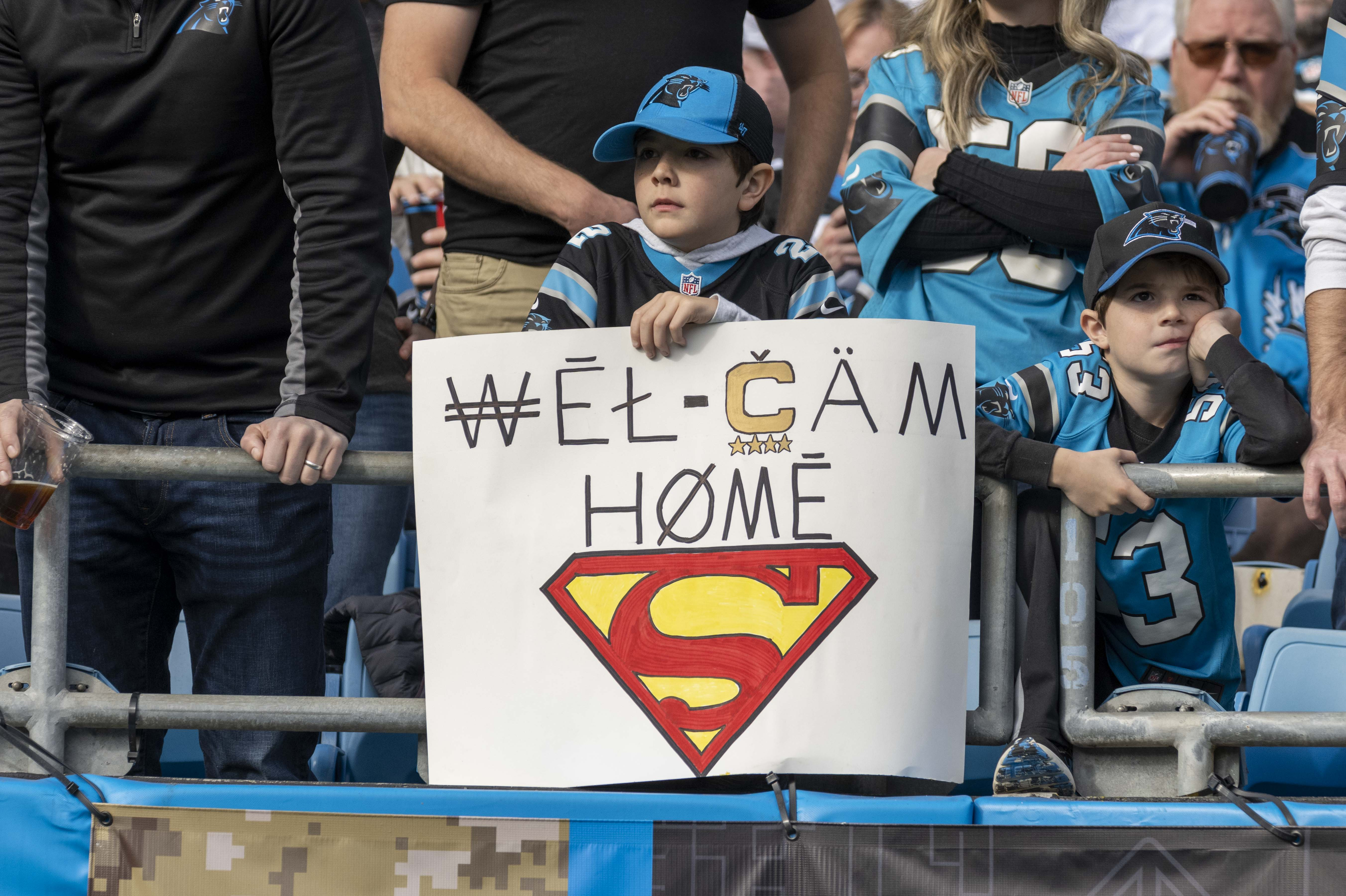
A young Panthers fan holding a handwritten sign during Newton's first game back at Bank of America Stadium

On November 11, 2021, Newton signed a one-year deal worth up to $10 million to return to the Panthers, following an injury to starting quarterback Sam Darnold. The deal included $4.5 million that was fully guaranteed and a $1.5 million roster bonus.

In his first game after re-signing, Newton received limited playing action as the backup to P. J. Walker in the Week 10 game against the Arizona Cardinals but made an immediate impact, scoring touchdowns on his first two plays of the game. The first-quarter touchdowns came by way of a two-yard run and a two-yard pass to Robby Anderson, respectively, and helped the Panthers to a 34–10 win. In his return to Carolina the following week, he was named the starter and scored two passing touchdowns and a rushing touchdown in a 27–21 loss to the Washington Football Team. Newton remained the starter for the Week 12 loss to the Miami Dolphins, but was benched in the fourth quarter for Walker after completing 5 of 21 passes for 92 yards, two interceptions, and a 5.8 passer rating. His 23.8 completion percentage was the lowest for a quarterback with at least 20 attempts since Joey Harrington in 2004. In a Week 14 game against the Atlanta Falcons, Newton was again named the starter, but split significant playing time with P.J. Walker, ending the game with a team-leading 47 yards rushing and a rushing touchdown, but also having thrown an interception in a 29–21 loss. Newton finished the season with 684 passing yards, four passing touchdowns, five interceptions, 230 rushing yards, and five rushing touchdowns in six games. The Panthers lost all five games he started.

== Career statistics ==
=== NFL ===
Legend
	AP NFL MVP & OPOTY
	Led the league
**Bold**	Career high

==== Regular season ====
Year	Team	Games			Passing									Rushing					Sacks		Fumbles	
Year	Team	GP	GS	Record	Cmp	Att	Pct	Yds	Avg	TD	Int	Lng	Rtg	Att	Yds	Avg	Lng	TD	Sck	SckY	Fum	Lost
2011	CAR	16	16	6–10	310	**517**	60.0	**4,051**	7.8	21	**17**	**91**	84.5	126	706	5.6	59	**14**	35	260	5	2
2012	CAR	16	16	7–9	280	485	57.7	3,869	**8.0**	19	12	82	86.2	127	741	**5.8**	**72**	8	36	244	**10**	3
2013	CAR	16	16	12–4	292	473	61.7	3,379	7.1	24	13	79	88.8	111	585	5.3	56	6	**43**	336	3	1
2014	CAR	14	14	5–8–1	262	448	58.5	3,127	7.0	18	12	51	82.1	103	539	5.2	22	5	38	300	9	**5**
2015	CAR	16	16	**15–1**	296	495	59.8	3,837	7.8	**35**	10	74	**99.4**	132	636	4.8	47	10	33	284	5	4
2016	CAR	15	14	6–8	270	510	52.9	3,509	6.9	19	14	88	75.8	90	359	4.0	28	5	36	277	3	2
2017	CAR	16	16	11–5	291	492	59.1	3,302	6.7	22	16	64	80.7	**139**	**754**	5.4	69	6	35	**342**	9	1
2018	CAR	14	14	6–8	**320**	471	**67.5**	3,395	7.2	24	13	82	94.2	101	488	4.8	29	4	29	213	6	0
2019	CAR	2	2	0–2	50	89	56.2	572	6.4	0	1	44	71.0	5	−2	−0.4	3	0	6	43	2	2
2020	NE	15	15	7–8	242	368	65.8	2,657	7.2	8	10	50	82.9	137	592	4.3	49	12	31	195	6	1
2021	CAR	8	5	0–5	69	126	54.8	684	5.4	4	5	27	64.4	47	230	4.9	33	5	10	83	4	1
Career		148	144	75−68−1	2,682	4,474	59.9	32,382	7.2	194	123	91	85.2	1,118	5,628	5.0	72	75	332	2,477	62	22

==== Postseason ====
Year	Team	Games			Passing									Rushing					Sacks		Fumbles	
Year	Team	GP	GS	Record	Cmp	Att	Pct	Yds	Avg	TD	Int	Lng	Rtg	Att	Yds	Avg	Lng	TD	Sck	SckY	Fum	Lost
2013	CAR	1	1	0–1	16	25	**64.0**	267	**10.7**	1	2	59	79.9	10	54	**5.4**	11	0	5	35	0	0
2014	CAR	2	2	1–1	41	68	60.3	444	6.5	**4**	**3**	39	80.8	18	72	4.0	13	0	3	16	**3**	**2**
2015	CAR	3	3	**2–1**	**53**	**91**	58.2	**761**	8.4	3	2	**86**	87.3	**27**	**95**	3.5	**14**	**2**	**8**	**85**	2	**2**
2017	CAR	1	1	0–1	24	40	60.0	349	8.7	2	0	56	**105.1**	8	37	4.6	10	0	4	43	0	0
Career		7	7	3–4	134	224	59.8	1,821	8.1	10	7	86	87.7	63	258	4.1	14	2	20	179	5	4

=== College ===
Season	Team	Games			Passing								Rushing			
Season	Team	GP	GS	Record	Cmp	Att	Pct	Yds	Y/A	TD	Int	Rtg	Att	Yds	Avg	TD
2007	Florida	5	0	—	5	10	50.0	40	4.0	0	0	83.6	16	103	**6.4**	3
2008	Florida	1	0	—	1	2	50.0	14	7.0	0	0	108.8	5	10	2.0	1
2009	Blinn	12	12	11−1	**204**	**336**	60.7	2,833	8.4	22	5	150.2	108	655	6.1	16
2010	Auburn	14	14	**14−0**	185	280	**66.1**	**2,854**	**10.2**	**30**	**7**	**182.0**	**264**	**1,473**	5.6	**20**
Career		32	26	25−1	395	628	62.9	5,741	9.1	52	12	163.2	393	2,241	5.7	40

== Career highlights ==
=== Awards and honors ===
NFL

- NFL MVP (2015)
- NFL Offensive Player of the Year (2015)
- NFL Offensive Rookie of the Year (2011)
- First-team All-Pro (2015)
- 3× Pro Bowl (2011, 2013, 2015)
- SN NFL Player of the Year (2015)
- Best NFL Player ESPY Award (2016)
- NFC champion (2015)
- PFWA MVP (2015)
- PFWA All-NFL Team (2015)
- PFWA All-NFC Team (2015)
- Bert Bell Award (2015)
- PFWA All-Rookie Team (2011)
- All-Iron Award (2015)
- NFL Offensive Rookie of the Month (September 2011)
- 3× Pepsi NFL Rookie of the Week (Weeks 4, 15, 16: 2011)
- 10× NFC Offensive Player of the Week
- 8× NFL Top 100 — 40th (2012), 46th (2013), 24th (2014), 73rd (2015), 1st (2016), 44th (2017), 25th (2018), 87th (2019)
- PFWA Offensive Rookie of the Year (2011)
- Sporting News Rookie of the Year (2011)

College

- 2× BCS national champion (2008, 2010)
- Heisman Trophy (2010)
- Maxwell Award (2010)
- Walter Camp Award (2010)
- Davey O'Brien Award (2010)
- Manning Award (2010)
- AP College Football Player of the Year (2010)
- SN College Player of the Year (2010)
- Chic Harley Award (2010)
- Consensus All-American (2010)
- SEC Offensive Player of the Year (2010)
- First-team All-SEC (2010)
- NJCAA national champion (2009)

=== Records ===
==== NFL records ====
- Most games in NFL history with a passing touchdown and a rushing touchdown (45, passed by Josh Allen in 2025)
- Most player of the week awards in a single season (5) tied with Tom Brady
- Most games in single season with at least one passing touchdown and one rushing touchdown (8)
- Only player in NFL history with at least 30 passing touchdowns and 10 rushing touchdowns in same season: 2015
- Most combined yards in a player's first five seasons (21,560)
- First quarterback and fifth player in NFL history with at least 500 rushing yards, 5 rushing touchdowns, and 4.8 yards a carry in 5 consecutive NFL seasons
- Most passing yards by a quarterback in debut game (422), September 11, 2011, against the Arizona Cardinals
- First player in NFL history with 4,000+ passing yards and 10+ rushing touchdowns in a season
- First player in NFL history with 4,000+ passing yards and 500+ rushing yards in a season
- First quarterback in NFL history with multiple seasons of 20+ passing touchdowns and 10+ rushing touchdowns in a season
- First player in NFL history with 10,000 passing yards and 1,000 rushing yards in his first three seasons
- First player in NFL history with 10,000 passing yards and 2,000 rushing yards in his first four seasons
- First player in NFL history to have at least 3,000 passing yards and 500 rushing yards in five consecutive seasons
- First quarterback in NFL history to rush for 100+ yards and pass for 300+ yards with 5 touchdowns in a single game (December 20, 2015).
- First player in NFL history with 100+ rush yards and 5 pass touchdowns in a single game
- First quarterback in NFL history with 10+ rushing touchdowns in multiple NFL seasons (2011, 2015)
- First quarterback in NFL history to earn a comeback victory when trailing in overtime
- First player in Super Bowl era to pass for 300 yards and rush for multiple touchdowns in a playoff game

==== Rookie records ====
- Most combined yards for a rookie in NFL history (4,784)
- First rookie to pass for at least 4,000 yards
- First and only rookie to pass for more than 4,000 yards and rush for more than 700 yards
- First rookie in NFL history to pass for more than 400 yards in back to back games, September 11, 2011, against the Arizona Cardinals and September 18, 2011, against the Green Bay Packers

==== Panthers franchise records ====
Note: As of 2019 off-season

- Pass completions, career (2,371), rookie season (310)
- Pass attempts, career (3,980), playoff game (41, February 7, 2016, against the Denver Broncos in Super Bowl 50)
- Passing yards, career (29,041), game (432, September 18, 2011, against the Green Bay Packers), playoff game (335, January 24, 2016, against the Arizona Cardinals in the NFC Championship), rookie season (4,051), rookie game (432, September 18, 2011, against the Green Bay Packers)
- Passing touchdowns, career (182), game (5, thrice, shared with Steve Beuerlein), rookie season (21), rookie game (3, October 30, 2011, against the Minnesota Vikings and December 24, 2011, against the Tampa Bay Buccaneers, shared with Kerry Collins)
- Interceptions, rookie game (4, November 20, 2011, against the Detroit Lions; shared with Kerry Collins (twice) and Chris Weinke)
- Passer Rating, season (99.4 in 2015), game (153.3, December 13, 2015, against the Atlanta Falcons), playoff career (83.9), rookie season (84.5), rookie game (142.4, December 24, 2011, against the Tampa Bay Buccaneers)
- Times sacked, career (291), game (9, November 10, 2014, against the Philadelphia Eagles; shared with Frank Reich), playoffs (16; shared with Jake Delhomme), playoff season (8 in 2015; shared with Jake Delhomme), playoff game (6, February 7, 2016, against the Denver Broncos in Super Bowl 50), rookie season (35)
- Yards per pass attempt, game (12.65, September 16, 2012, against the New Orleans Saints), playoff season (10.68 in 2013), playoff game (11.96, January 24, 2016, against the Arizona Cardinals in the NFC Championship), rookie season (7.84), and rookie game (11.41, September 11, 2011, against the Arizona Cardinals)
- Passing yards per game, career (232.3), playoffs (245.3), playoff season (267 in 2013), and rookie season (253.2)
- 300+ yard passing games, career (20) and rookie season (3)
- 4,000+ yard passing seasons: 1 (shared with Steve Beuerlein)
- Rushing touchdowns, career (58), rookie season (14), rookie game (3, December 4, 2011, against the Tampa Bay Buccaneers; shared with Fred Lane)
- Yards per carry, career (5.18), season (5.83 in 2012), rookie season (5.60)
- Rush/Rec Touchdowns, playoff game (2; shared with 3 players), rookie season (14), rookie game (3, December 4, 2011, against the Tampa Bay Buccaneers; shared with Fred Lane)
- Most combined yards in franchise history
- Most NFC Offensive Player of the Week Awards in a single season (5)
- Completions in a row (15) (December 6, 2015, against the New Orleans Saints)
- First quarterback in franchise history to throw four touchdown passes in the first half of a game (November 22, 2015, against the Washington Redskins)

==== Patriots franchise records ====
- Longest run by a quarterback (49 yards) (against the New York Jets on January 3, 2021)
- Most rushing yards by a quarterback, season (592)
- Most rushing touchdowns by a quarterback, season (12, tied with Steve Grogan)
- First quarterback to receive a touchdown pass

== Media career ==
In 2016, Newton hosted All in with Cam Newton. In October 2024, Newton was hired by ESPN as a football commentator, primarily appearing on First Take. In August 2025, Newton reached a new multi-year deal with ESPN, which included an "expanded role" on First Take. Newton parted ways with ESPN in July 2026 as part of a massive talent layoff.

On October 15, 2025, 106 & Sports, premiered with Newton and Ashley Nicole Moss as co-hosts on BET. The series is executive produced by LeBron James and Maverick Carter.

== Personal life ==
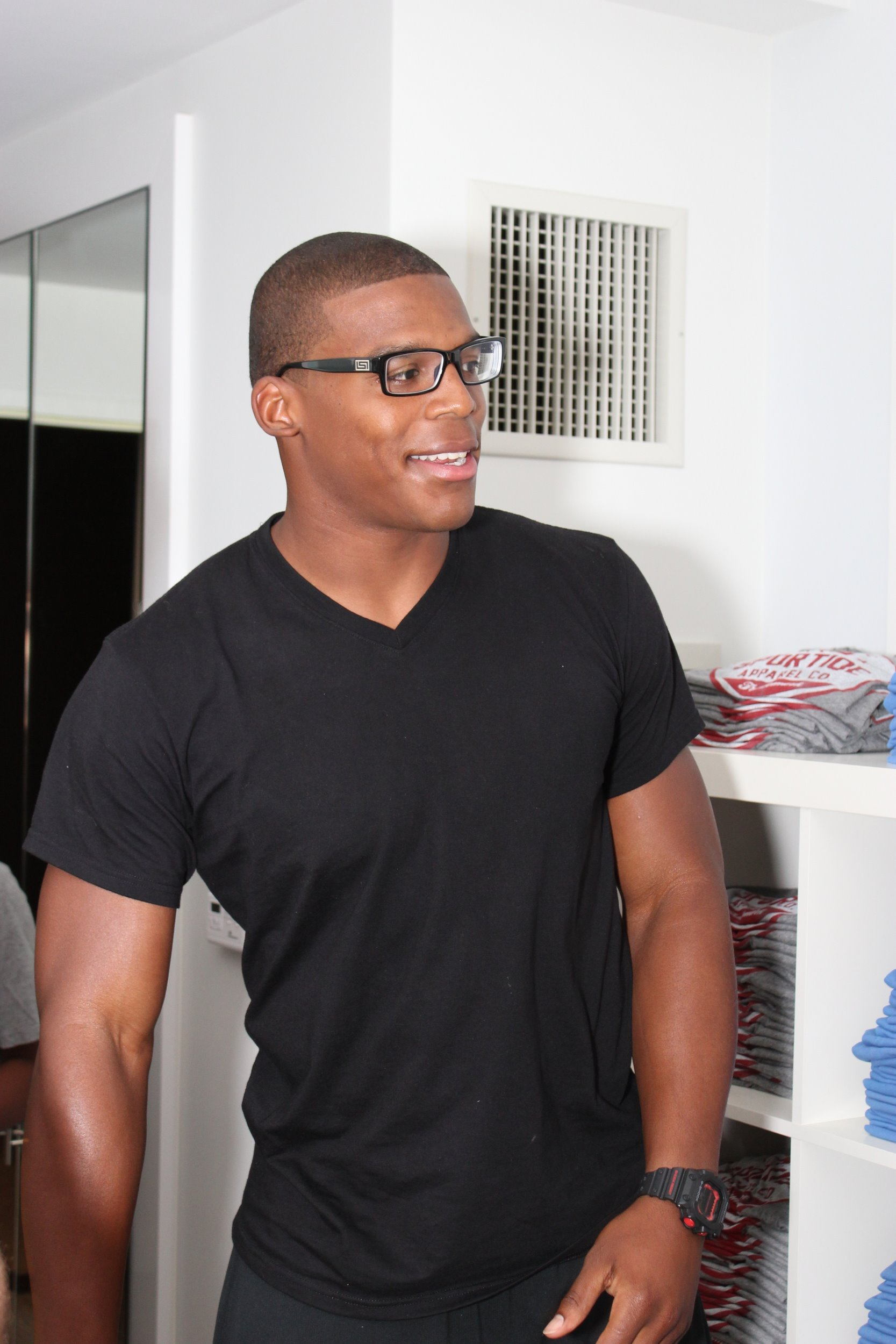
Newton in 2011

=== Relationships and children ===
Newton has nine children; five of whom he has with former girlfriend, Kia Proctor. The total of nine children include two children from his partners’ previous relationships. Newton has stated, “I proudly say I have 8 children. Six biologically through me. And I don’t believe in stepchildren […] What my biological kids get, everybody gets. I don’t have no favorites. I’m raising kings and queens.”

In mid-2019, Newton fathered a son with an Instagram model months before his fourth child with Proctor was born. Newton and Proctor split later that year as a result of the affair.

In 2024, Newton also fathered a daughter with actress and comedian Jasmin Brown. In May 2025, Brown announced that the couple were expecting another child, which will be Newton’s ninth.

=== Diet and lifestyle ===
Newton was a self-proclaimed pescetarian. As of March 2019, he has become a vegan.

Newton is a Christian. He spoke about his faith after winning the 2011 BCS National Championship Game, saying: "It's just a God thing. I thank God every single day. I'm just His instrument and He's using me on a consistent basis daily."

On December 9, 2014, Newton was involved in a car crash in Charlotte where his vehicle flipped, and he suffered two back fractures.

=== Business ventures ===
In 2013, Newton partnered with Southern department store chain Belk on his own clothing line, MADE by Cam Newton.

In February 2019, Cam Newton launched his YouTube channel, which he has updated consistently since.

In May 2019, Newton's cigar bar and restaurant named Fellaship formally opened at Olympic Park Drive near Mercedes-Benz Stadium in downtown Atlanta.

In addition to his commitment to football, Newton participates in motivational speaking, and has a namesake foundation dedicated to "enhancing the lives of youth by addressing their educational, physical and social needs".

=== 2024 Heisman Trophy ceremony attendance ===
In December 2024, Newton attended the Heisman Trophy ceremony for the first time since winning the award in 2010. His absence from previous ceremonies was due to a personal decision stemming from events surrounding his 2010 win. Newton's return to the ceremony was motivated by his desire to support Travis Hunter, a finalist for (and eventual winner of) the 2024 Heisman Trophy.

== See also ==
- List of Auburn Tigers starting quarterbacks
- List of Auburn Tigers football statistical leaders
- List of Carolina Panthers starting quarterbacks
- List of New England Patriots starting quarterbacks
- List of first overall National Football League draft picks
- List of Heisman Trophy winners
