= List of Auburn Tigers starting quarterbacks =

This is a list of every Auburn Tigers football team quarterback and the years they participated on the Auburn Tigers football team.

== Main starting quarterbacks ==
=== 1892 to 1894 ===
The following players were the predominant quarters for the Tigers.

Name	Years Started	Notability	References
Frank Lupton	1892	Auburn's first ever captain; scores its first ever points.	
Shel Toomer	1892	Later a state senator, namesake of Toomer's Corner.	
J. C. Dunham	1893		
Dutch Dorsey	1893	Scored the first-ever touchdown against Georgia.	

=== 1895 to 1921 ===
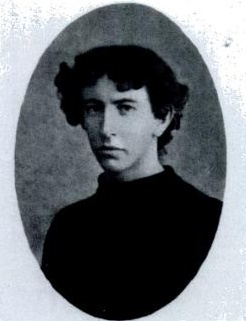
W. R. Tichenor

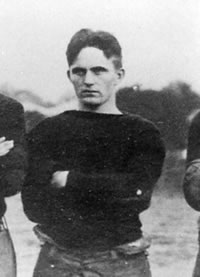
Kirk Newell

The following quarterbacks were the predominant quarters for the Tigers each season after the establishment of the Southern Intercollegiate Athletic Association until the establishment of the Southern Conference.

Name	Years Started	Notability	References
Reynolds Tichenor	1894–1896	Weighed only 116 pounds. He once executed a "hidden ball trick" in the 1895 game against Vanderbilt, a 6 to 9 loss which was the first game in the south decided by a field goal.	
Holcombe	1897		
Ed Huguley	1897–1900		
C. J. Williams	1901		
Zac Smith	1902–1903		
"Runt" Perkins	1904; 1906		
Royden Stanley	1905–1906		
Tom McLure	1906–1908	All-Southern (1908). McLure and Lew Hardage were in the 1908 backfield which despite a loss to LSU claims a southern title.	
Walker Reynolds	1909	First cousin of Reynolds Tichenor.	
Kirk Newell	1910–1913	Led Auburn to 1913 SIAA title. Gained 1,707 yards that year, 46% of the team's entire offensive output. Twice All-Southern. Alabama Sports Hall of Fame.	
Tom Wingo	1911		
Rip Major	1912	Coached at Wofford.	
Ted Arnold	1913	Allowed Newell to move to halfback, his more natural position. Later a referee	
Legare Hairston	1914	"Lucy" piloted Auburn to its 1914 SIAA title. in 1916, Moon Ducote kicked a field goal off of Hairston's helmet to beat Georgia.	
Kenny Caughman	1915	Transferred from Clemson.	
Homer Prendergast	1915–1916	Later coached high school ball in Shreveport.	
Pat Jones	1916		
Carey Robinson	1917	Played center all his other years. Later AD for Birmingham-Southern.	
Frank Stubbs	1918; 1920	Dated Zelda Sayre.	
John Trapp	1919	Led Auburn to 1919 SIAA title.	
Charles Scott	1919		
Red Brown	1920		
Charles Gibson	1921–1922		

=== 1922 to 1932 ===
The following quarterbacks were the predominant quarters for the Tigers each season after the establishment of the Southern Conference until the establishment of the Southeastern Conference.

Name	Years Started	Notability	References
S. D. Peterson	1923–1924		
Frank Tuxworth	1925	Threw a touchdown to Pea Green to tie Georgia Tech.	
Frankie Bogue	1925		
Pat Moulton	1926		
W. A. Hodges	1927		
Porter Callahan	1928		
Khaki Robinson	1929–1930		
Chattie Davidson	1931	He was co-captain with guard J. D. Bush.	
Ripper Williams	1932–1933	All-SEC	

=== 1933 to present ===
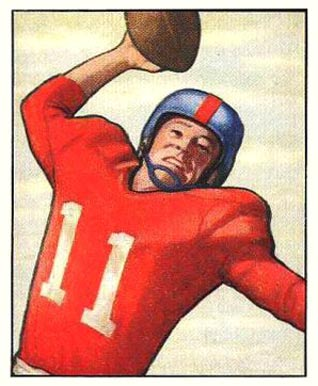
Travis Tidwell

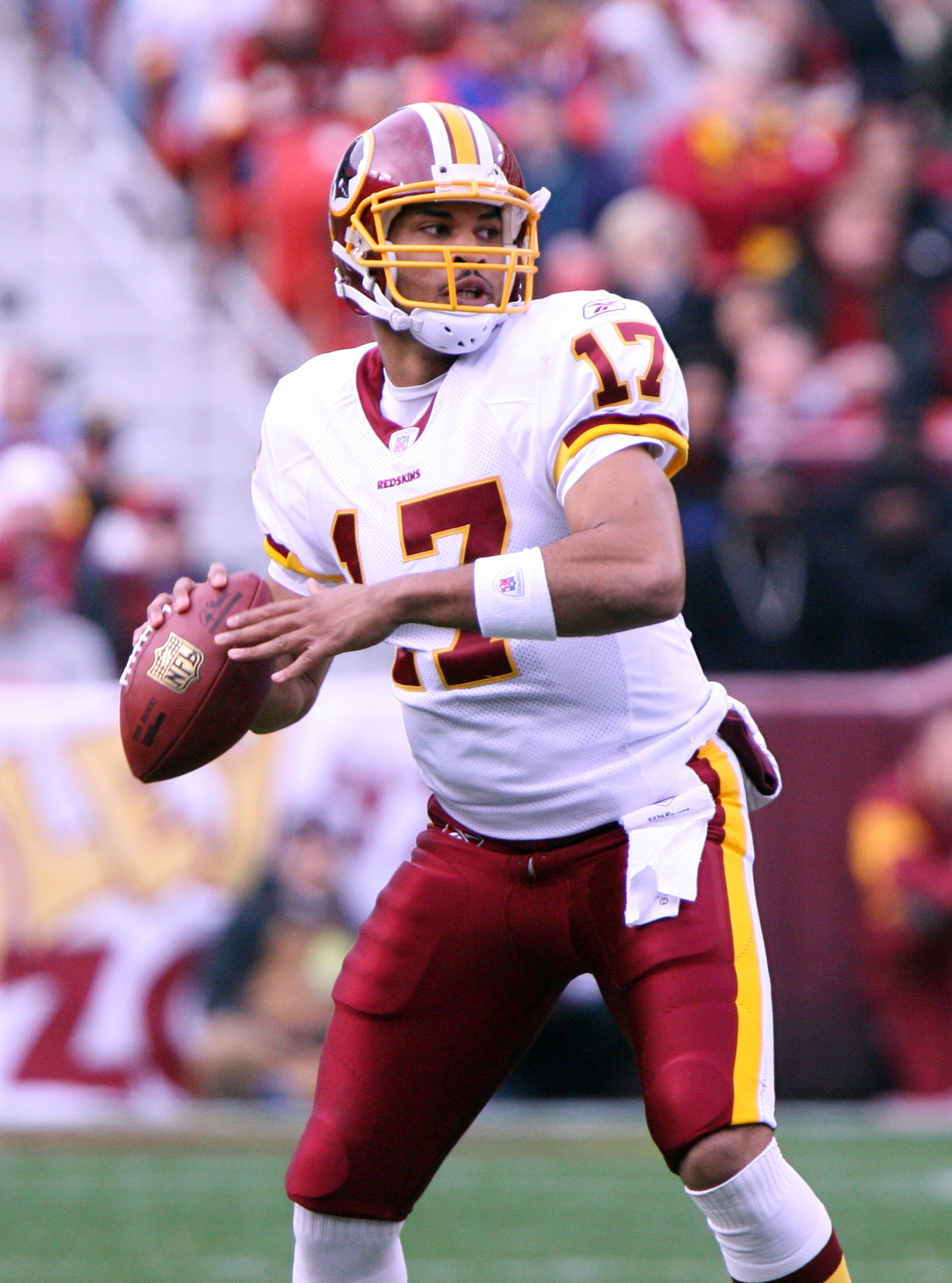
Jason Campbell in 2006

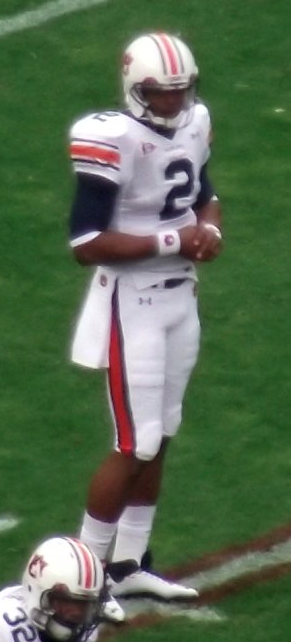
Cam Newton

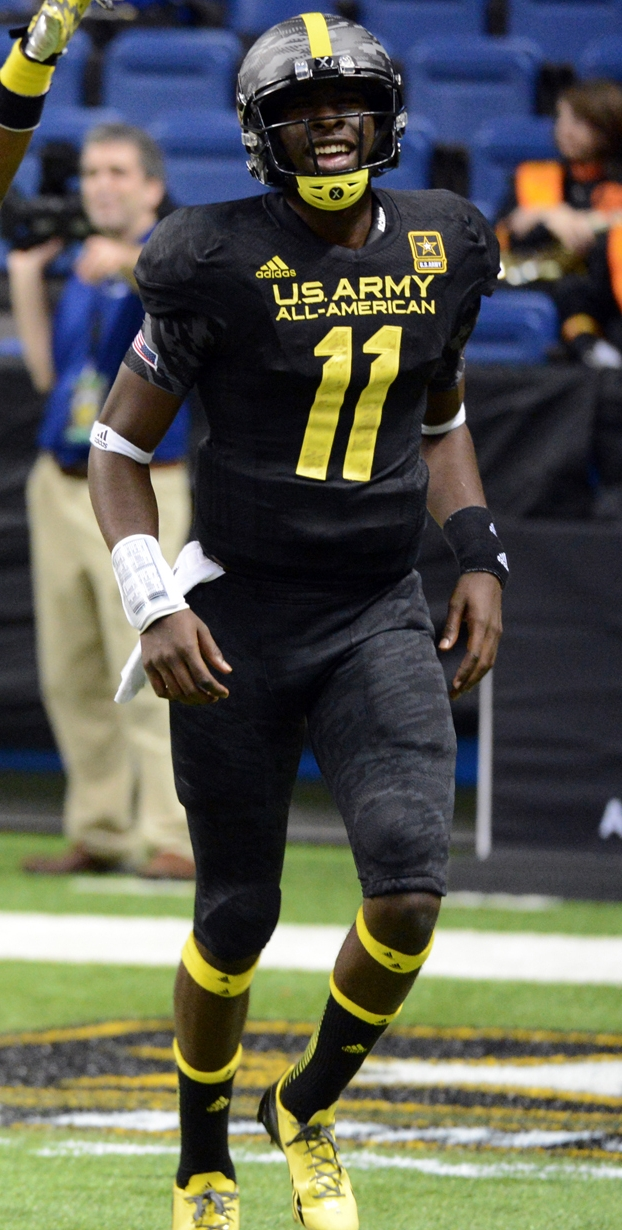
Jeremy Johnson

The following quarterbacks were the predominant quarters for the Tigers each season after the establishment of the Southeastern Conference up to the present day.

Name	Years Started	W-L	Notability	References
Billy Hitchcock	1936	-	Brother of Jimmy.	
Pig Walker	1937–1938			
Lloyd Cheatham	1939–1941	-	All-SEC.	
A. J. Gendusa	1942			
Aubrey Clayton	1942			
Hunter Owens	1944			
Leon Cochran	1945			
Edwin House	1945			
James McDaniel	1946–1947			
Travis Tidwell	1948–1949	-	National Football League player.	
Bill Tucker	1950			
Allan Parks	1950–1951			
Dudley Spence	1952			
Vince Dooley	1951–1953	14-16-1	Later a prominent coach for the Georgia Bulldogs.	
Bobby Freeman	1954			
Howell Tubbs	1955–1956			
Lloyd Nix	1957–1958	19-0-1	1957 SEC Championship and national championship. 19–0–1 record as a starter.	
Bryant Harvard	1959	-		
Bobby Hunt	1959–61	-	Hunt played both quarterback and defensive back for the Tigers from 1959 to 1961. In 1959, he was named SEC Sophomore of the Year, was named to Auburn's Team of the Decade for the 1960s as a defensive back. Went on to become a starter at DB in the NFL and was a starter for the Kansas City Chiefs in Super Bowl I.	
Jimmy Sidle	1963–1964	-	First SEC quarterback to rush for over 1,000 yards. All-American in 1963.	
Tom Bryan	1964–1966	-		
Loran Carter	1966–1968	-		
Pat Sullivan	1969–1971	26-7	Heisman Trophy Winner (1971). College Football Hall of Fame.	
Randy Walls	1972–1973	16-7		
Phil Gargis	1974–1976	18-15-1		
Charlie Trotman	1977–1979	20-12-1		
Joe Sullivan	1980–81	-	Brother of Pat Sullivan.	
Charles Thomas	1981	-		
Randy Campbell	1982–1983	-	Led Auburn to 9–3 record in 1982 and to an 11–1 record, SEC Title and Sugar Bowl victory in 1983.	
Pat Washington	1984–1985	-		
Bobby Walden	1985	-	Freshman starter, had to give up football with knee injury.	
Jeff Burger	1985–1987	-	SEC Championship 1987, 10-win 1986 season, first Auburn quarterback to take a snap from the 'shotgun' position.	
Reggie Slack	1987–1989	-	SEC Championship 1988–1989	
Stan White	1990–1993	29-14-2	School record for career passing yards. Led the Tigers to an undefeated season in 1993. Only four-year starter at QB at Auburn.	
Patrick Nix	1994–1995	17-5-1		
Dameyune Craig	1996–1997	18-7	1997 SEC West Championship	
Gabe Gross	1998–99	-	Opted to concentrate on baseball career after losing starting QB job to Leard during the first game of the 1999 season. Went on to successful MLB career.	
Ben Leard	1998–2000	-		
Daniel Cobb	2001–2002	-		
Jason Campbell	2002–2004	-	As a starter, he had a different offensive coordinator every year, finally finding success in his senior year when he led the Tigers to an undefeated season in 2004 and was named the SEC Player of the Year and MVP of the SEC Championship Game.	
Brandon Cox	2005–2007	29-9	3-0 against Alabama	
Kodi Burns	2008	-		
Chris Todd	2008–2009	-	2008 SEC Offensive Newcomer of the Year 2009 First Team All-SEC	
Cam Newton	2010	14-0	Newton netted a Heisman Trophy, Maxwell Award, Walter Camp Award, Davey O'Brien Award, Manning Award, AP College Football Player of the Year, All-American, and a national championship in 2010.	
Barrett Trotter	2011	6–2		
Clint Mosley	2011-2012	1–6		
Kiehl Frazier	2012	1–4		
Jonathan Wallace	2012	2-2		
Nick Marshall	2013–2014	20-7	In his first season on Auburn's team, Marshall led the Tigers to an SEC Championship in 2013 and the 2014 BCS National Championship Game. In two seasons, he amassed 4508 passing yards & 34 passing TD, and 1866 rushing yards & 23 rushing TD. He is one of three Auburn players to pass for 2,000 yards and rush for 1,000 yards in a career. He ranks third in school history for TDs accounted for with 57. Marshall moved to defensive back for the NFL draft. He now plays cornerback in the CFL for the Saskatchewan Roughriders.	
Jeremy Johnson	2015	-		
Sean White	2015–2016	-	Became first Auburn freshman quarterback to throw for 250 or more yards in three consecutive games.	
Jarrett Stidham	2017– 2018	18-9	Completed a school-record 18 consecutive passes vs. Mercer on Sep 16, 2017	
Bo Nix	2019-2021	16-10	Son of Patrick Nix.	
T. J. Finley	2021-2022	2-4	LSU Transfer. Took over in 2021, following injury to Nix. Week 1 starter in 2022 following Nix's transfer	
Robby Ashford	2022	3-6	Oregon Transfer	
Payton Thorne	2023-2024	7-7	Michigan State Transfer	
Hank Brown	2024	1-1		
Jackson Arnold	2025	4-5	Oklahoma Sooners Transfer	
