= 2024 New England Patriots season =

65th season in franchise history

- Owner: Robert Kraft
- General manager: Eliot Wolf (de facto)
- Head coach: Jerod Mayo
- Home stadium: Gillette Stadium

Results
- Record: 4–13
- Division place: 4th AFC East
- Playoffs: Did not qualify
- All-Pros: ST Brenden Schooler (1st team); CB Christian Gonzalez (2nd team)
- Pro Bowlers: ST Brenden Schooler; QB Drake Maye

Uniform
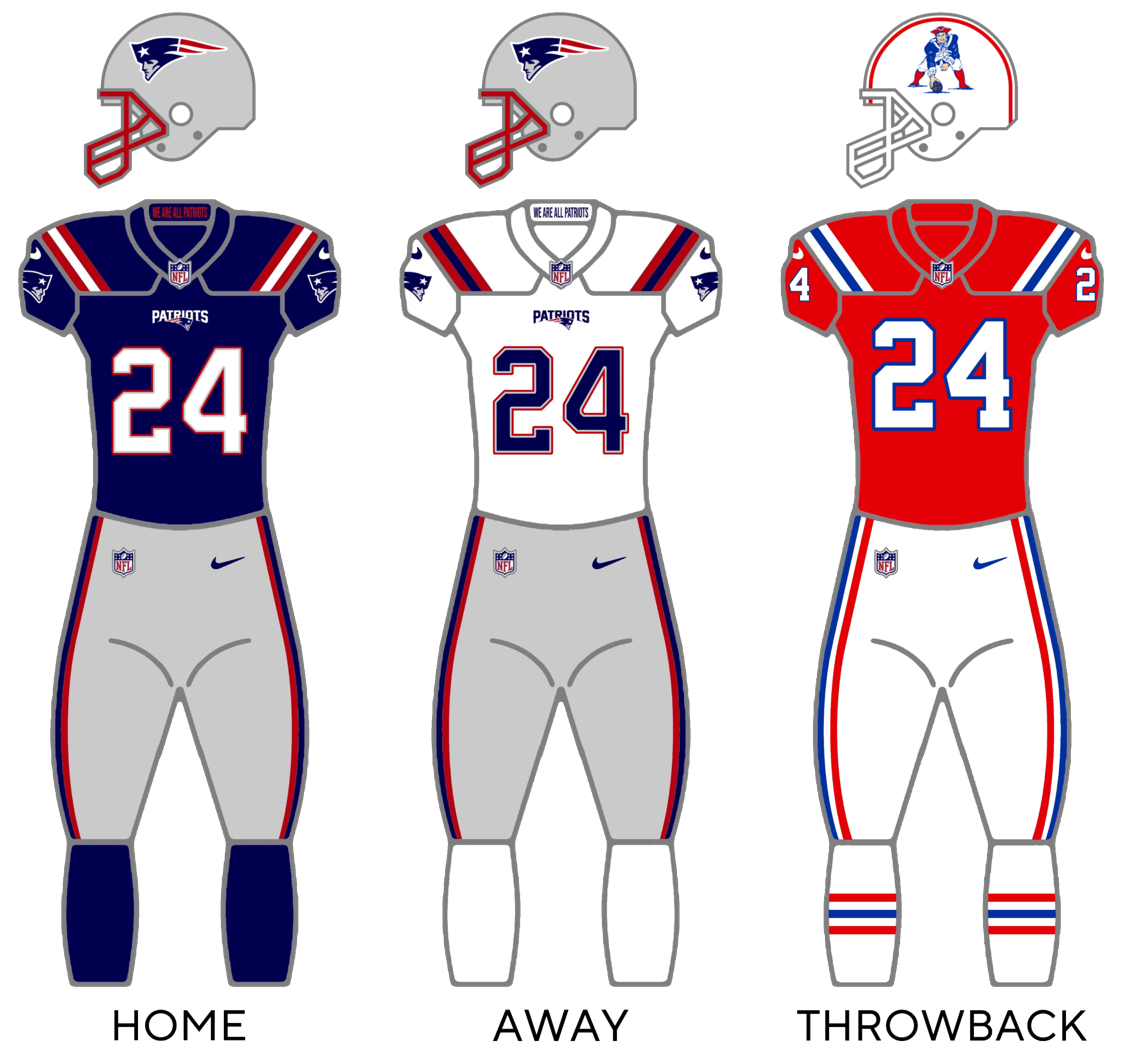

The 2024 season was the New England Patriots' 55th in the National Football League (NFL), their 65th overall, and their 23rd playing home games at Gillette Stadium. This was their first year under a new de facto general manager, executive vice president of player personnel Eliot Wolf, and their only season under head coach Jerod Mayo.

The Patriots matched their AFC-worst 4–13 record from the previous year, unable to improve upon it following a Week 17 loss to the Los Angeles Chargers. They started 1–6 while also losing 6 straight games for the first time since 1993. The Patriots failed to end their four-year AFC East title drought after a Week 12 loss to the Miami Dolphins dropping them to 3–9, guaranteeing their third losing season in a row and their fourth in five years. The Patriots were eliminated from playoff contention the following week with a loss to the Indianapolis Colts coupled with the Houston Texans beating the Jacksonville Jaguars. After an upset win over the Buffalo Bills in Week 18, Jerod Mayo was fired after just one season. That same win also eliminated their chance of obtaining the first overall pick in the 2025 NFL draft. In addition, after the New York Jets defeated the Dolphins later that day, the Patriots finished in last place in the AFC East, the first time since both 1999 and 2000 the Patriots finished last in the AFC East in consecutive seasons. In addition, in week 9, the Patriots suffered the indignity of losing to the Titans, 20–17, at Nissan Stadium, providing the Titans with their only home win during their head coach Brian Callahan's tenure.

This was the first season since 1999 without long time head coach Bill Belichick, as he and the Patriots mutually agreed to part ways on January 11. A day later, linebacker coach Jerod Mayo was hired as the 15th head coach in franchise history; Mayo had played with the team between 2008 and 2015, winning Super Bowl XLIX with them. This was also the first season since 2007 without special teams star Matthew Slater on the roster after he announced his retirement on February 20.

Prior to the season, on June 12, Patriots legend Tom Brady was enshrined into the Patriots Hall of Fame. His jersey number 12 was retired as over 60,000 fans attended the ceremony.

== Roster changes ==
=== Free agency ===
==== Unrestricted ====
Position	Player	2024 team	Date signed	Contract
WR	Kendrick Bourne	New England Patriots	March 21, 2024	3 years, $19.5 million
TE	Pharaoh Brown	Seattle Seahawks	March 14, 2024	1 year, $3.2 million
OT	Trent Brown	Cincinnati Bengals	March 19, 2024	1 year, $4.75 million
CB	Myles Bryant	Houston Texans	April 2, 2024	1 year, $1.75 million
S	Cody Davis			
S	Kyle Dugger	New England Patriots	April 7, 2024	4 years, $58 million
RB	Ezekiel Elliott	Dallas Cowboys	April 29, 2024	1 year, $3 million
TE	Mike Gesicki	Cincinnati Bengals	March 14, 2024	1 year, $2.5 million
LB	Terez Hall			
TE	Hunter Henry	New England Patriots	March 13, 2024	3 years, $27 million
LB	Anfernee Jennings	New England Patriots	March 15, 2024	3 years, $12 million
S	Jalen Mills	New York Giants	March 14, 2024	1 year, $1.38 million
WR	Tre Nixon			
OT	Michael Onwenu	New England Patriots	March 14, 2024	3 years, $57 million
WR	Jalen Reagor	New England Patriots	March 13, 2024	1 year, $1.29 million
OT	Riley Reiff			
LB	Josh Uche	New England Patriots	March 13, 2024	1 year, $3 million
LB	Mack Wilson	Arizona Cardinals	March 14, 2024	3 years, $12.75 million

==== Exclusive Rights ====
Position	Player	2024 team	Date signed	Contract
CB	Alex Austin	New England Patriots	March 13, 2024	1 year, $915,000
LB	Christian Elliss	New England Patriots	March 12, 2024	2 years, $1.6 million
QB	Nathan Rourke	New England Patriots	March 12, 2024	1 year, $915,000
OT	Tyrone Wheatley Jr.	New England Patriots	March 12, 2024	1 year, $750,000

==== Signings/waiver claims ====
Player	Position	Previous team	Date signed	Contract
OT	Chukwuma Okorafor	Pittsburgh Steelers	March 11, 2024	1 year, $4 million
RB	Antonio Gibson	Washington Commanders	March 14, 2024	3 years, $11.25 million
TE	Austin Hooper	Las Vegas Raiders	March 14, 2024	1 year, $3.13 million
LB	Sione Takitaki	Cleveland Browns	March 14, 2024	2 years, $6.65 million
QB	Jacoby Brissett	Washington Commanders	March 15, 2024	1 year, $8 million
G	Nick Leverett	Tampa Bay Buccaneers	March 15, 2024	1 year, $1.78 million
DT	Armon Watts	Pittsburgh Steelers	March 15, 2024	1 year, $2.2 million
WR	K. J. Osborn	Minnesota Vikings	March 19, 2024	1 year, $4 million
S	Jaylinn Hawkins	Los Angeles Chargers	March 21, 2024	1 year, $1.29 million
TE	Mitchell Wilcox	Cincinnati Bengals	April 22, 2024	1 year, $1.08 million
LB	Oshane Ximines	New York Giants	April 30, 2024	1 year, $1.13 million
K	Joey Slye	Jacksonville Jaguars	May 2, 2024	1 year, $1.27 million
OG	Liam Fornadel	DC Defenders	June 18, 2024	3 years, $2.83 million
OT	Kellen Diesch	Cleveland Browns	August 2, 2024	1 year, $795,000
S	A. J. Thomas	Birmingham Stallions	August 2, 2024	1 year, $985,000
RB	Deshaun Fenwick	New England Patriots	August 12, 2024	1 year, $795,000
WR	Matt Landers	Cleveland Browns	August 20, 2024	1 year, $225,000

=== Releases/waivers ===
Position	Player	Date released/waived
DT	Lawrence Guy	February 20, 2024
S	Adrian Phillips	February 20, 2024
CB	J. C. Jackson	March 1, 2024
LB	Chris Board	March 14, 2024
WR	DeVante Parker	March 14, 2024
OT	Conor McDermott	April 29, 2024
QB	Nathan Rourke	May 6, 2024
RB	Ke'Shawn Vaughn	May 13, 2024
OG	Andrew Stueber	June 3, 2024
WR	T. J. Luther	June 6, 2024
LB	Jay Person	June 11, 2024
LB	Jontrey Hunter	July 22, 2024
RB	Deshaun Fenwick	August 2, 2024
OT	Tyrone Wheatley Jr.	August 2, 2024
WR	JuJu Smith-Schuster	August 9, 2024
DE	John Morgan III	August 12, 2024
DT	Mike Purcell	August 21, 2024
LS	Tucker Addington	August 26, 2024
WR	Kawaan Baker	August 26, 2024
DE	William Bradley-King	August 26, 2024
DT	Josiah Bronson	August 26, 2024
LB	Steele Chambers	August 26, 2024
RB	Deshaun Fenwick	August 26, 2024
CB	Azizi Hearn	August 26, 2024
OT	Zuri Henry	August 26, 2024
DE	Christian McCarroll	August 26, 2024
TE	La'Michael Pettway	August 26, 2024
DT	Sam Roberts	August 26, 2024
C	Charles Turner III	August 26, 2024
CB	Mikey Victor	August 26, 2024
TE	Jacob Warren	August 26, 2024
S	Joshua Bledsoe	August 27, 2024
OT	Kellen Diesch	August 27, 2024
C	Liam Fornadel	August 27, 2024
LB	Joe Giles-Harris	August 27, 2024
RB	Kevin Harris	August 27, 2024
RB	Terrell Jennings	August 27, 2024
LB	Kobe Jones	August 27, 2024
WR	Matt Landers	August 27, 2024
OG	Atonio Mafi	August 27, 2024
DE	Jotham Russell	August 27, 2024
K	Chad Ryland	August 27, 2024
S	A. J. Thomas	August 27, 2024
CB	Shaun Wade	August 27, 2024
WR	David Wallis	August 27, 2024
TE	Mitchell Wilcox	August 27, 2024
QB	Bailey Zappe	August 27, 2024
CB	Isaiah Bolden	August 28, 2024
DT	Trysten Hill	August 28, 2024
OG	Michael Jordan	August 28, 2024
WR	Jalen Reagor	August 28, 2024
DE	Jamree Kromah	October 9, 2024
C	Nick Leverett	October 14, 2024
WR	Tyquan Thornton	November 16, 2024
CB	Marco Wilson	November 18, 2024
WR	K. J. Osborn	December 10, 2024

=== Trades ===
- March 14 – Quarterback Mac Jones was traded to the Jacksonville Jaguars in exchange for a 2024 sixth-round selection (No. 193).
- August 14 – Linebacker Matthew Judon was traded to the Atlanta Falcons in exchange for a 2025 third-round selection.
- October 28 – Linebacker Joshua Uche was traded to the Kansas City Chiefs in exchange for a 2026 sixth-round selection.

== Draft ==
2024 New England Patriots draft selections
Round	Selection	Player	Position	College	Notes
1	3	Drake Maye	QB	North Carolina	
2	37	Ja'Lynn Polk	WR	Washington	From Chargers (Note: The Patriots traded second- and fifth-round selections (34th and 137th overall) to the Los Angeles Chargers in exchange for second- and fourth-round selections (37th and 110th overall).)
3	68	Caedan Wallace	OT	Penn State	
4	103	Layden Robinson	G	Texas A&M	
4	110	Javon Baker	WR	UCF	From Bears via Chargers
6	180	Marcellas Dial	CB	South Carolina	
6	193	Joe Milton	QB	Tennessee	From Jaguars (Note: The Patriots traded QB Mac Jones to the Jacksonville Jaguars in exchange for a sixth-round selection (193rd overall).)
7	231	Jaheim Bell	TE	Florida State	From Bears (Note: The Patriots traded WR N'Keal Harry to the Chicago Bears in exchange for a seventh-round selection (231st overall).)

2024 New England Patriots undrafted free agents
Name	Position	College	Ref.
Deshaun Fenwick	RB	Oregon State	
Kaleb Ford-Dement	CB	Texas State	
Zuri Henry	OT	UTEP	
Jontrey Hunter	LB	Georgia State	
John Morgan III	DE	Arkansas	
Dell Pettus	S	Troy	
Charles Turner III	C	LSU	
Mikey Victor	CB	Alabama State	
Jacob Warren	TE	Tennessee	
Terrell Jennings	RB	Florida A&M	
Ryan Johnson	G	Youngstown State	
Jay Person	LB	Chattanooga	
Jotham Russell	DE	IPPP	
David Wallis	WR	Randolph–Macon	
JaQuae Jackson	WR	Rutgers	
Steele Chambers	LB	Ohio State	

Draft trades

== Staff ==
2024 New England Patriots staff
Front office: Chairman/CEO – Robert Kraft; President – Jonathan Kraft; Executive vice president of player personnel – Eliot Wolf; Executive vice president of football business – Robyn Glaser; Director of player personnel – Matt Groh; Director of pro personnel – Patrick Stewart; Assistant director of pro personnel – Sam Fioroni; Director of college scouting – Camren Williams; Director of scouting administration – Nancy Meier; Director of football strategy – Marshall Oium; Personnel coordinator – Brian Smith; Senior personnel executive – Alonzo Highsmith; Head coaches: Head coach – Jerod Mayo; Special assistant to the head coach – Matthew Slater; Offensive coaches: Offensive coordinator – Alex Van Pelt; Senior offensive assistant – Ben McAdoo; Quarterbacks – T. C. McCartney; Assistant quarterbacks / Director of game management – Evan Rothstein; Running backs – Taylor Embree; Wide receivers – Tyler Hughes; Assistant wide receivers – Tiquan Underwood; Tight ends – Bob Bicknell; Offensive line – Scott Peters; Assistant offensive line – Robert Kugler; Offensive coaching assistant – Michael McCarthy; Offensive coaching assistant – Omar Young	Defensive coaches: Defensive coordinator – DeMarcus Covington; Defensive line – Jerry Montgomery; Outside linebackers – Drew Wilkins; Inside linebackers – Dont'a Hightower; Cornerbacks – Mike Pellegrino; Safeties – Brian Belichick; Defensive coaching assistant – Vinny DePalma; Defensive coaching assistant – Jamael Lett; Defensive coaching assistant – Keith Jones Jr.; Special teams coaches: Special teams coordinator – Jeremy Springer; Kick & punt returners / Skill development – Troy Brown; Special teams assistant – Tom Quinn; Special teams assistant – Coby Tippett; Strength and conditioning: Head strength and conditioning – Deron Mayo; Strength and conditioning assistant – Brian McDonough; Strength and conditioning assistant – Brandon Martuccio; Strength and conditioning assistant – Dexter Taylor

== Final roster ==
2024 New England Patriots roster
Quarterbacks (QB): 7 Jacoby Brissett; 10 Drake Maye; 19 Joe Milton; Running backs (RB): 4 Antonio Gibson; 39 JaMycal Hasty; 26 Terrell Jennings; 38 Rhamondre Stevenson; Wide receivers (WR): 6 Javon Baker; 84 Kendrick Bourne; 9 Kayshon Boutte; 3 Demario Douglas; 1 Ja'Lynn Polk; Tight ends (TE): 88 Jaheim Bell; 85 Hunter Henry; 81 Austin Hooper; 87 Jack Westover	Offensive linemen (OL): 61 Lester Cotton RG; 75 Demontrey Jacobs RT; 59 Vederian Lowe LT; 71 Mike Onwenu RG; 64 Layden Robinson LG; 65 Tyrese Robinson LG; 68 Lecitus Smith C; 62 Sidy Sow RT; 69 Cole Strange C; 70 Caedan Wallace LT; Defensive linemen (DL): 95 Daniel Ekuale DT; 92 Davon Godchaux DT; 96 Eric Johnson DT; 54 Truman Jones DE; 98 Jeremiah Pharms Jr. DT; 99 Keion White DE; 91 Deatrich Wise Jr. DE	Linebackers (LB): 53 Christian Elliss MLB; 33 Anfernee Jennings OLB; 97 Titus Leo OLB; 45 Monty Rice MLB; 16 Sione Takitaki MLB; 48 Jahlani Tavai MLB; Defensive backs (DB): 28 Alex Austin CB; 35 Miles Battle CB; 29 Isaiah Bolden CB; 27 Marcellas Dial CB; 23 Kyle Dugger SS; 0 Christian Gonzalez CB; 21 Jaylinn Hawkins FS; 31 Jonathan Jones CB; 15 Marte Mapu FS; 24 Dell Pettus S; 41 Brenden Schooler SS; Special teams (ST): 17 Bryce Baringer P; 49 Joe Cardona LS; 13 Joey Slye K	Practice squad: 14 Alex Erickson WR; 36 Kevin Harris RB; 58 Marcus Harris DT; 30 D. J. James CB; 83 John Jiles WR; 76 Caleb Jones LT; 47 Andrew Parker Jr. LB; 34 Mark Perry S; 11 John Parker Romo K; 66 Jotham Russell DE (IPP); 80 Braylon Sanders WR; 86 Mitchell Wilcox TE; Reserve: 60 David Andrews C (IR); 67 Jake Andrews C (IR); 90 Christian Barmore DT (NF-Inj.); 8 Ja'Whaun Bentley MLB (IR); 77 Ben Brown C (IR); 82 JaQuae Jackson WR (IR); 52 Curtis Jacobs MLB (IR); 25 Marcus Jones CB (IR); 77 Chukwuma Okorafor LT (Left squad); 5 Jabrill Peppers FS (IR); 1 Ja'Lynn Polk WR (IR); 94 Jaquelin Roy DT (IR); 93 Oshane Ximines OLB (IR); Rookies in italics 52 active, 13 reserve, 11 practice squad (1 exempt)

== Preseason ==
Week	Date	Opponent	Result	Record	Venue	Recap
1	August 8	Carolina Panthers	W 17–3	1–0	Gillette Stadium	Recap
2	August 15	Philadelphia Eagles	L 13–14	1–1	Gillette Stadium	Recap
3	August 25	at Washington Commanders	L 10–20	1–2	Commanders Field	Recap

== Regular season ==
=== Schedule ===
Week	Date	Opponent	Result	Record	Venue	Recap
1	September 8	at Cincinnati Bengals	**W** 16–10	1–0	Paycor Stadium	Recap
2	September 15	Seattle Seahawks	**L** 20–23 (OT)	1–1	Gillette Stadium	Recap
3	September 19	at **New York Jets**	**L** 3–24	1–2	MetLife Stadium	Recap
4	September 29	at San Francisco 49ers	**L** 13–30	1–3	Levi's Stadium	Recap
5	October 6	**Miami Dolphins**	**L** 10–15	1–4	Gillette Stadium	Recap
6	October 13	Houston Texans	**L** 21–41	1–5	Gillette Stadium	Recap
7	October 20	at Jacksonville Jaguars	**L** 16–32	1–6	(United Kingdom) Wembley Stadium (London)	Recap
8	October 27	**New York Jets**	**W** 25–22	2–6	Gillette Stadium	Recap
9	November 3	at Tennessee Titans	**L** 17–20 (OT)	2–7	Nissan Stadium	Recap
10	November 10	at Chicago Bears	**W** 19–3	3–7	Soldier Field	Recap
11	November 17	Los Angeles Rams	**L** 22–28	3–8	Gillette Stadium	Recap
12	November 24	at **Miami Dolphins**	**L** 15–34	3–9	Hard Rock Stadium	Recap
13	December 1	Indianapolis Colts	**L** 24–25	3–10	Gillette Stadium	Recap
14	Bye					
15	December 15	at Arizona Cardinals	**L** 17–30	3–11	State Farm Stadium	Recap
16	December 22	at **Buffalo Bills**	**L** 21–24	3–12	Highmark Stadium	Recap
17	December 28	Los Angeles Chargers	**L** 7–40	3–13	Gillette Stadium	Recap
18	January 5	**Buffalo Bills**	**W** 23–16	4–13	Gillette Stadium	Recap

Note: Intra-division opponents are in bold text.

=== Game summaries ===
==== Week 1: at Cincinnati Bengals ====
Week 1: New England Patriots at Cincinnati Bengals – Game summary

Quarter	1	2	3	4	Total
**Patriots**	0	10	3	3	**16**
Bengals	0	0	7	3	**10**

at Paycor Stadium, Cincinnati, Ohio

- Date: September 8
- Game time: 1:00 p.m. EDT
- Game weather: Sunny, 66 °F (19 °C)
- Game attendance: 66,214
- Referee: Land Clark
- TV announcers (CBS): Ian Eagle, Charles Davis, and Evan Washburn
- Recap, Game Book

Game information

**First quarter**

- No scoring plays.

**Second quarter**

- NE – Rhamondre Stevenson 3-yard run (Joey Slye kick), 14:58. Patriots 7–0. **Drive: 14 plays, 80 yards, 7:20.**
- NE – Joey Slye 32-yard field goal, 0:00. Patriots 10–0. **Drive: 12 plays, 68 yards, 5:09.**

**Third quarter**

- NE – Joey Slye 35-yard field goal, 11:34. Patriots 13–0. **Drive: 4 plays, 7 yards, 2:08.**
- CIN – Zack Moss 5-yard run (Evan McPherson kick), 1:10. Patriots 13–7. **Drive: 9 plays, 90 yards, 4:27.**

**Fourth quarter**

- NE – Joey Slye 37-yard field goal, 8:46. Patriots 16–7. **Drive: 12 plays, 52 yards, 7:24.**
- CIN – Evan McPherson 51-yard field goal, 6:14. Patriots 16–10. **Drive: 6 plays, 37 yards, 2:32.**

**Top passers**

- NE – Jacoby Brissett – 15/24, 121 yards
- CIN – Joe Burrow – 21/29, 164 yards

**Top rushers**

- NE – Rhamondre Stevenson – 25 rushes, 120 yards, TD
- CIN – Zack Moss – 9 rushes, 44 yards, TD

**Top receivers**

- NE – Austin Hooper – 2 receptions, 31 yards
- CIN – Ja'Marr Chase – 6 receptions, 62 yards

With the upset win, the Patriots started 1–0 for the first time since 2020.

==== Week 2: vs. Seattle Seahawks ====
Week 2: Seattle Seahawks at New England Patriots – Game summary

Quarter	1	2	3	4	OT	Total
**Seahawks**	7	10	0	3	3	**23**
Patriots	7	6	0	7	0	**20**

at Gillette Stadium, Foxborough, Massachusetts

- Date: September 15
- Game time: 1:00 p.m. EDT
- Game weather: Sunny, 77 °F (25 °C)
- Game attendance: 64,686
- Referee: Carl Cheffers
- TV announcers (Fox): Kenny Albert, Jonathan Vilma and Megan Olivi
- Recap, Game Book

Game information

**First quarter**

- NE – Ja'Lynn Polk 5-yard pass from Jacoby Brissett (Joey Slye kick), 4:56. Patriots 7–0. **Drive: 8 plays, 60 yards, 4:53.**
- SEA – DK Metcalf 56-yard pass from Geno Smith (Jason Myers kick), 2:50. Tied 7–7. **Drive: 4 plays, 72 yards, 2:06.**

**Second quarter**

- NE – Joey Slye 29-yard field goal, 11:05. Patriots 10–7. **Drive: 15 plays, 59 yards, 6:45.**
- SEA – Zach Charbonnet 1-yard run (Jason Myers kick), 5:47. Seahawks 14–10. **Drive: 11 plays, 70 yards, 5:18.**
- NE – Joey Slye 28-yard field goal, 2:31. Seahawks 14–13. **Drive: 9 plays, 60 yards, 3:16.**
- SEA – Jason Myers 44-yard field goal, 0:00. Seahawks 17–13. **Drive: 6 plays, 26 yards, 0:35.**

**Third quarter**

- No scoring plays.

**Fourth quarter**

- NE – Rhamondre Stevenson 1-yard run (Joey Slye kick), 12:43. Patriots 20–17. **Drive: 11 plays, 66 yards, 6:20.**
- SEA – Jason Myers 38-yard field goal, 0:55. Tied 20–20. **Drive: 9 plays, 42 yards, 2:59.**

**Overtime**

- SEA – Jason Myers 31-yard field goal, 4:37. Seahawks 23–20. **Drive: 8 plays, 71 yards, 3:35.**

**Top passers**

- SEA – Geno Smith – 33/44, 327 yards, TD
- NE – Jacoby Brissett – 15/27, 149 yards, TD

**Top rushers**

- SEA – Zach Charbonnet – 14 rushes, 38 yards, TD
- NE – Antonio Gibson – 11 rushes, 96 yards

**Top receivers**

- SEA – DK Metcalf – 10 receptions, 129 yards, TD
- NE – Hunter Henry – 8 receptions, 109 yards

With the loss, the Patriots fell to 1–1 and 1–8 in their last nine home games dating back to last season.

==== Week 3: at New York Jets ====
Week 3: New England Patriots at New York Jets – Game summary

Quarter	1	2	3	4	Total
Patriots	0	3	0	0	**3**
**Jets**	7	7	7	3	**24**

at MetLife Stadium, East Rutherford, New Jersey

- Date: September 19
- Game time: 8:15 p.m. EDT
- Game weather: Cloudy, 75 °F (24 °C)
- Game attendance: 80,812
- Referee: John Hussey
- TV announcers (WFXT/Prime Video): Al Michaels, Kirk Herbstreit, and Kaylee Hartung
  Game exclusive to WFXT through syndication. Out of market on Prime Video.
- Recap, Game Book

Game information

**First quarter**

- NYJ – Allen Lazard 10-yard pass from Aaron Rodgers (Greg Zuerlein kick), 4:21. Jets 7–0. **Drive: 8 plays, 73 yards, 4:13.**

**Second quarter**

- NYJ – Breece Hall 1-yard run (Greg Zuerlein kick), 8:32. Jets 14–0. **Drive: 13 plays, 91 yards, 7:47.**
- NE – Joey Slye 44-yard field goal, 3:56. Jets 14–3. **Drive: 8 plays, 50 yards, 4:36.**

**Third quarter**

- NYJ – Garrett Wilson 2-yard pass from Aaron Rodgers (Greg Zuerlein kick), 6:18. Jets 21–3. **Drive: 11 plays, 66 yards, 7:10.**

**Fourth quarter**

- NYJ – Greg Zuerlein 28-yard field goal, 10:16. Jets 24–3. **Drive: 7 plays, 28 yards, 3:46.**

**Top passers**

- NE – Jacoby Brissett – 12/18, 98 yards
- NYJ – Aaron Rodgers – 27/35, 281 yards, 2 TD

**Top rushers**

- NE – Antonio Gibson – 5 rushes, 29 yards
- NYJ – Braelon Allen – 11 rushes, 55 yards

**Top receivers**

- NE – Demario Douglas – 7 receptions, 69 yards
- NYJ – Tyler Conklin – 5 receptions, 93 yards

With the lopsided loss, the Patriots fell to 1–2. This was the Pats' first away loss to the Jets since 2015. Rookie Drake Maye would make his regular season debut in the fourth quarter, completing four of eight passes for 22 yards and rushing for 12 yards.

==== Week 4: at San Francisco 49ers ====
Week 4: New England Patriots at San Francisco 49ers – Game summary

Quarter	1	2	3	4	Total
Patriots	0	3	7	3	**13**
**49ers**	6	14	7	3	**30**

at Levi's Stadium, Santa Clara, California

- Date: September 29
- Game time: 4:05 p.m. EDT/1:05 p.m. PDT
- Game weather: Sunny, 71 °F (22 °C)
- Game attendance: 71,042
- Referee: Scott Novak
- TV announcers (Fox): Joe Davis, Greg Olsen, and Pam Oliver
- Recap, Game Book

Game information

**First quarter**

- SF – Jake Moody 22-yard field goal, 2:26. 49ers 3–0. **Drive: 15 plays, 90 yards, 7:45.**
- SF – Jake Moody 26-yard field goal, 0:06. 49ers 6–0. **Drive: 5 plays, 22 yards, 2:09.**

**Second quarter**

- SF – Fred Warner 45-yard interception return (Jake Moody kick), 14:01. 49ers 13–0. **Drive: 3 plays, 5 yards, 1:05.**
- SF – George Kittle 12-yard pass from Brock Purdy (Jake Moody kick), 3:11. 49ers 20–0. **Drive: 10 plays, 80 yards, 4:56.**
- NE – Joey Slye 63-yard field goal, 0:00. 49ers 20–3. **Drive: 4 plays, −6 yards, 0:38.**

**Third quarter**

- NE – Austin Hooper 5-yard pass from Jacoby Brissett (Joey Slye kick), 12:05. 49ers 20–10. **Drive: 5 plays, 27 yards, 2:49.**
- SF – Jordan Mason 4-yard run (Jake Moody kick), 10:08. 49ers 27–10. **Drive: 4 plays, 70 yards, 1:57.**

**Fourth quarter**

- NE – Joey Slye 54-yard field goal, 13:26. 49ers 27–13. **Drive: 8 plays, 32 yards, 2:07.**
- SF – Jake Moody 41-yard field goal, 4:58. 49ers 30–13. **Drive: 6 plays, 13 yards, 3:20.**

**Top passers**

- NE – Jacoby Brissett – 19/32, 168 yards, TD, INT
- SF – Brock Purdy – 15/27, 288 yards, TD, INT

**Top rushers**

- NE – Rhamondre Stevenson – 13 rushes, 43 yards
- SF – Jordan Mason – 24 rushes, 123 yards, TD

**Top receivers**

- NE – Antonio Gibson – 3 receptions, 67 yards
- SF – Jauan Jennings – 3 receptions, 88 yards

Despite Joey Slye kicking in a 63-yard field goal, the longest in Patriots team history, the 49ers blew out the Patriots to drop them to 1–3.

==== Week 5: vs. Miami Dolphins ====
Week 5: Miami Dolphins at New England Patriots – Game summary

Quarter	1	2	3	4	Total
**Dolphins**	3	0	6	6	**15**
Patriots	7	0	3	0	**10**

at Gillette Stadium, Foxborough, Massachusetts

- Date: October 6
- Game time: 1:00 p.m. EDT
- Game weather: Sunny, 65 °F (18 °C)
- Game attendance: 64,628
- Referee: Adrian Hill
- TV announcers (Fox): Chris Myers, Mark Sanchez and Kristina Pink
- Recap, Game Book

Game information

**First quarter**

- MIA – Jason Sanders 54-yard field goal, 10:39. Dolphins 3–0. **Drive: 8 plays, 38 yards, 4:21.**
- NE – Rhamondre Stevenson 33-yard run (Joey Slye kick), 3:55. Patriots 7–3. **Drive: 4 plays, 43 yards, 2:16.**

**Second quarter**

- No scoring plays.

**Third quarter**

- NE – Joey Slye 38-yard field goal, 11:01. Patriots 10–3. **Drive: 10 plays, 50 yards, 3:59.**
- MIA – Jason Sanders 32-yard field goal, 7:47. Patriots 10–6. **Drive: 8 plays, 56 yards, 3:14.**
- MIA – Jason Sanders 47-yard field goal, 0:30. Patriots 10–9. **Drive: 9 plays, 57 yards, 5:15.**

**Fourth quarter**

- MIA – Alec Ingold 3-yard run (pass failed), 4:24. Dolphins 15–10. **Drive: 15 plays, 80 yards, 7:36.**

**Top passers**

- MIA – Tyler Huntley – 18/31, 194 yards, INT
- NE – Jacoby Brissett – 18/34, 160 yards

**Top rushers**

- MIA – Jaylen Wright – 13 rushes, 86 yards
- NE – Rhamondre Stevenson – 12 rushes, 89 yards, TD

**Top receivers**

- MIA – Tyreek Hill – 6 receptions, 69 yards
- NE – Demario Douglas – 6 receptions, 59 yards

With the loss, the Patriots fell to 1–4, 1–9 in their last 10 home games and 1–6 in their last 7 games against the Dolphins.

==== Week 6: vs. Houston Texans ====
Week 6: Houston Texans at New England Patriots – Game summary

Quarter	1	2	3	4	Total
**Texans**	14	0	13	14	**41**
Patriots	0	7	7	7	**21**

at Gillette Stadium, Foxborough, Massachusetts

- Date: October 13
- Game time: 1:00 p.m. EDT
- Game weather: Cloudy, 56 °F (13 °C)
- Game attendance: 64,628
- Referee: Ronald Torbert
- TV announcers (CBS): Kevin Harlan, Trent Green and Melanie Collins
- Recap, Game Book

Game information

**First quarter**

- HOU – Tank Dell 2-yard pass from C. J. Stroud (Kaʻimi Fairbairn kick), 9:13. Texans 7–0. **Drive: 11 plays, 65 yards, 5:47.**
- HOU – Joe Mixon 10-yard pass from C. J. Stroud (Kaʻimi Fairbairn kick), 3:13. Texans 14–0. **Drive: 8 plays, 45 yards, 4:21.**

**Second quarter**

- NE – Kayshon Boutte 40-yard pass from Drake Maye (Joey Slye kick), 0:11. Texans 14–7. **Drive: 5 plays, 84 yards, 0:48.**

**Third quarter**

- HOU – Stefon Diggs 10-yard pass from C. J. Stroud (Kaʻimi Fairbairn kick), 13:28. Texans 21–7. **Drive: 2 plays, 10 yards, 0:42.**
- HOU – Kaʻimi Fairbairn 39-yard field goal, 6:56. Texans 24–7. **Drive: 10 plays, 59 yards, 5:02.**
- HOU – Kaʻimi Fairbairn 46-yard field goal, 5:22. Texans 27–7. **Drive: 4 plays, 3 yards, 1:20.**
- NE – Hunter Henry 6-yard pass from Drake Maye (Joey Slye kick), 1:00. Texans 27–14. **Drive: 7 plays, 70 yards, 4:22.**

**Fourth quarter**

- HOU – Joe Mixon 20-yard run (Kaʻimi Fairbairn kick), 13:14. Texans 34–14. **Drive: 2 plays, 26 yards, 0:49.**
- NE – Demario Douglas 35-yard pass from Drake Maye (Joey Slye kick), 9:24. Texans 34–21. **Drive: 8 plays, 70 yards, 3:50.**
- HOU – Dameon Pierce 54-yard run (Kaʻimi Fairbairn kick), 7:47. Texans 41–21. **Drive: 4 plays, 70 yards, 1:37.**

**Top passers**

- HOU – C. J. Stroud – 20/31, 192 yards, 3 TD, INT
- NE – Drake Maye – 20/33, 243 yards, 3 TD, 2 INT

**Top rushers**

- HOU – Joe Mixon – 13 rushes, 102 yards, TD
- NE – Drake Maye – 5 rushes, 38 yards

**Top receivers**

- HOU – Stefon Diggs – 6 receptions, 77 yards, TD
- NE – Demario Douglas – 6 receptions, 92 yards, TD

The Patriots made a change at quarterback before the game, starting rookie Drake Maye. In his first start, Maye completed 20 of 33 passes for 243 yards with 3 touchdowns and 2 interceptions and rushed for 38 yards. This was the first time the Pats lost to the Texans at home as they dropped to 1–5 for the second consecutive season and lost their 10th home game in the last 11.

==== Week 7: at Jacksonville Jaguars ====
NFL London games

Week 7: New England Patriots at Jacksonville Jaguars – Game summary

Quarter	1	2	3	4	Total
Patriots	7	3	0	6	**16**
**Jaguars**	0	22	3	7	**32**

at Wembley Stadium, London, England

- Date: October 20
- Game time: 2:30 p.m. BST/9:30 a.m. EDT
- Game weather: Cloudy, 63 °F (17 °C)
- Game attendance: 86,651
- Referee: Brad Rogers
- TV announcers (WCVB/NFLN): Chris Rose, Joe Thomas, and Steve Wyche
  Game exclusive to WCVB through syndication. Out of market on the NFL Network.
- Recap, Game Book

Game information

**First quarter**

- NE – JaMycal Hasty 16-yard pass from Drake Maye (Joey Slye kick), 8:32. Patriots 7–0. **Drive: 11 plays, 68 yards, 6:28.**

**Second quarter**

- NE – Joey Slye 41-yard field goal, 13:31. Patriots 10–0. **Drive: 12 plays, 63 yards, 6:31.**
- JAX – Brian Thomas Jr. 6-yard pass from Trevor Lawrence (Cam Little kick), 9:21. Patriots 10–7. **Drive: 8 plays, 68 yards, 4:10.**
- JAX – Tank Bigsby 1-yard run (Cam Little kick), 3:32. Jaguars 14–10. **Drive: 6 plays, 82 yards, 3:37.**
- JAX – Parker Washington 96-yard punt return (Trevor Lawrence–Brian Thomas Jr. pass), 1:34. Jaguars 22–10.

**Third quarter**

- JAX – Cam Little 21-yard field goal, 9:42. Jaguars 25–10. **Drive: 12 plays, 67 yards, 5:18.**

**Fourth quarter**

- NE – K. J. Osborn 22-yard pass from Drake Maye (pass failed), 8:22. Jaguars 25–16. **Drive: 9 plays, 94 yards, 2:48.**
- JAX – Tank Bigsby 4-yard run (Cam Little kick), 1:41. Jaguars 32–16. **Drive: 3 plays, 10 yards, 0:13.**

**Top passers**

- NE – Drake Maye – 26/37, 276 yards, 2 TD
- JAX – Trevor Lawrence – 15/20, 193 yards, TD

**Top rushers**

- NE – Drake Maye – 3 rushes, 18 yards
- JAX – Tank Bigsby – 26 rushes, 118 yards, 2 TD

**Top receivers**

- NE – Hunter Henry – 8 receptions, 92 yards
- JAX – Brian Thomas Jr. – 5 receptions, 89 yards, TD

With the loss, the Patriots fell to 1–6 (0–2 against the AFC South), their sixth straight loss and their worst start since 1993.

==== Week 8: vs. New York Jets ====
Week 8: New York Jets at New England Patriots – Game summary

Quarter	1	2	3	4	Total
Jets	6	7	3	6	**22**
**Patriots**	7	0	7	11	**25**

at Gillette Stadium, Foxborough, Massachusetts

- Date: October 27
- Game time: 1:00 p.m. EDT
- Game weather: Sunny, 53 °F (12 °C)
- Game attendance: 64,628
- Referee: Craig Wrolstad
- TV announcers (CBS): Spero Dedes, Adam Archuleta, and Aditi Kinkhabwala
- Recap, Game Book

Game information

**First quarter**

- NE – Drake Maye 17-yard run (Joey Slye kick), 5:18. Patriots 7–0. **Drive: 10 plays, 77 yards, 6:28.**
- NYJ – Tyler Conklin 2-yard pass from Aaron Rodgers (kick failed, wide left), 1:23. Patriots 7–6. **Drive: 7 plays, 70 yards, 3:55.**

**Second quarter**

- NYJ – Xavier Gipson 1-yard pass from Aaron Rodgers (Greg Zuerlein kick), 9:06. Jets 13–7. **Drive: 8 plays, 60 yards, 4:39.**

**Third quarter**

- NE – Rhamondre Stevenson 3-yard run (Joey Slye kick), 10:55. Patriots 14–13. **Drive: 5 plays, 26 yards, 2:15.**
- NYJ – Greg Zuerlein 29-yard field goal, 7:54. Jets 16–14. **Drive: 7 plays, 59 yards, 3:01.**

**Fourth quarter**

- NE – Joey Slye 23-yard field goal, 7:34. Patriots 17–16. **Drive: 14 plays, 61 yards, 5:05.**
- NYJ – Braelon Allen 2-yard run (pass failed), 2:57. Jets 22–17. **Drive: 10 plays, 70 yards, 4:37.**
- NE – Rhamondre Stevenson 1-yard run (Jacoby Brissett–Rhamondre Stevenson pass), 0:25. Patriots 25–22. **Drive: 12 plays, 70 yards, 2:35.**

**Top passers**

- NYJ – Aaron Rodgers – 17/28, 233 yards, TD
- NE – Jacoby Brissett – 15/24, 132 yards

**Top rushers**

- NYJ – Breece Hall – 16 rushes, 80 yards
- NE – Rhamondre Stevenson – 20 rushes, 48 yards, 2 TD

**Top receivers**

- NYJ – Garrett Wilson – 5 receptions, 113 yards
- NE – Kayshon Boutte – 3 receptions, 46 yards

With their 16th win in 18 games against the Jets since 2016, the Patriots improved to 2–6 and won their first home game since Week 7 of last season.

==== Week 9: at Tennessee Titans ====
Week 9: New England Patriots at Tennessee Titans – Game summary

Quarter	1	2	3	4	OT	Total
Patriots	0	3	7	7	0	**17**
**Titans**	7	0	3	7	3	**20**

at Nissan Stadium, Nashville, Tennessee

- Date: November 3
- Game time: 1:00 p.m. EST/12:00 p.m. CST
- Game weather: Cloudy, 75 °F (24 °C)
- Game attendance: 66,533
- Referee: Alex Kemp
- TV announcers (Fox): Jason Benetti, Mark Schlereth and Jen Hale
- Recap, Game Book

Game information

**First quarter**

- TEN – Nick Vannett 9-yard pass from Mason Rudolph (Nick Folk kick), 10:18. Titans 7–0. **Drive: 8 plays, 75 yards, 4:42.**

**Second quarter**

- NE – Joey Slye 52-yard field goal, 7:13. Titans 7–3. **Drive: 11 plays, 46 yards, 5:32.**

**Third quarter**

- NE – Rhamondre Stevenson 1-yard run (Joey Slye kick), 7:39. Patriots 10–7. **Drive: 12 plays, 70 yards, 7:21.**
- TEN – Nick Folk 21-yard field goal, 0:34. Tied 10–10. **Drive: 14 plays, 67 yards, 7:05.**

**Fourth quarter**

- TEN – Nick Westbrook-Ikhine 6-yard pass from Mason Rudolph (Nick Folk kick), 4:27. Titans 17–10. **Drive: 5 plays, 26 yards, 2:26.**
- NE – Rhamondre Stevenson 5-yard pass from Drake Maye (Joey Slye kick), 0:00. Tied 17–17. **Drive: 11 plays, 50 yards, 1:45.**

**Overtime**

- TEN – Nick Folk 25-yard field goal, 2:32. Titans 20–17. **Drive: 13 plays, 72 yards, 7:28.**

**Top passers**

- NE – Drake Maye – 29/41, 206 yards, TD, 2 INT
- TEN – Mason Rudolph – 20/33, 240 yards, 2 TD, 3 INT

**Top rushers**

- NE – Drake Maye – 8 rushes, 95 yards
- TEN – Tony Pollard – 28 rushes, 128 yards

**Top receivers**

- NE – Hunter Henry – 7 receptions, 56 yards
- TEN – Calvin Ridley – 5 receptions, 73 yards

With the loss, the Patriots fell to 2–7 for the second straight season.

==== Week 10: at Chicago Bears ====
Week 10: New England Patriots at Chicago Bears – Game summary

Quarter	1	2	3	4	Total
**Patriots**	3	10	0	6	**19**
Bears	0	3	0	0	**3**

at Soldier Field, Chicago, Illinois

- Date: November 10
- Game time: 1:00 p.m. EST/12:00 p.m. CST
- Game weather: Mostly cloudy, 60 °F (16 °C)
- Game attendance: 58,912
- Referee: Land Clark
- TV announcers (Fox): Kevin Kugler, Daryl Johnston and Laura Okmin
- Recap, Game Book

Game information

**First quarter**

- NE – Joey Slye 30-yard field goal, 6:19. Patriots 3–0. **Drive: 11 plays, 54 yards, 5:26.**

**Second quarter**

- CHI – Cairo Santos 33-yard field goal, 7:17. Tied 3–3. **Drive: 12 plays, 50 yards, 4:41.**
- NE – Ja'Lynn Polk 2-yard pass from Drake Maye (Joey Slye kick), 1:46. Patriots 10–3. **Drive: 10 plays, 70 yards, 5:31.**
- NE – Joey Slye 37-yard field goal, 0:00. Patriots 13–3. **Drive: 5 plays, 41 yards, 0:35.**

**Third quarter**

- No scoring plays.

**Fourth quarter**

- NE – Joey Slye 25-yard field goal, 7:30. Patriots 16–3. **Drive: 10 plays, 47 yards, 6:03.**
- NE – Joey Slye 33-yard field goal, 2:17. Patriots 19–3. **Drive: 7 plays, 31 yards, 2:37.**

**Top passers**

- NE – Drake Maye – 15/25, 184 yards, TD, INT
- CHI – Caleb Williams – 16/30, 120 yards

**Top rushers**

- NE – Rhamondre Stevenson – 20 rushes, 74 yards
- CHI – D'Andre Swift – 16 rushes, 59 yards

**Top receivers**

- NE – Austin Hooper – 3 receptions, 64 yards
- CHI – Keenan Allen – 5 receptions, 44 yards

With the win, the Patriots improve to 3–7 and got their first win over an NFC team since Week 14 of 2022.

==== Week 11: vs. Los Angeles Rams ====
Week 11: Los Angeles Rams at New England Patriots – Game summary

Quarter	1	2	3	4	Total
**Rams**	0	14	14	0	**28**
Patriots	7	3	3	9	**22**

at Gillette Stadium, Foxborough, Massachusetts

- Date: November 17
- Game time: 1:00 p.m. EST
- Game weather: Sunny, 59 °F (15 °C)
- Game attendance: 64,628
- Referee: Shawn Smith
- TV announcers (Fox): Adam Amin, Mark Sanchez and Kristina Pink
- Recap, Game Book

Game information

**First quarter**

- NE – Kendrick Bourne 9-yard pass from Drake Maye (Joey Slye kick), 5:05. Patriots 7–0. **Drive: 7 plays, 77 yards, 3:34.**

**Second quarter**

- LAR – Cooper Kupp 5-yard pass from Matthew Stafford (Joshua Karty kick), 7:18. Tied 7–7. **Drive: 9 plays, 80 yards, 5:05.**
- LAR – Puka Nacua 12-yard pass from Matthew Stafford (Joshua Karty kick), 5:45. Rams 14–7. **Drive: 1 play, 12 yards, 0:04.**
- NE – Joey Slye 32-yard field goal, 1:52. Rams 14–10. **Drive: 9 plays, 57 yards, 3:53.**

**Third quarter**

- LAR – Cooper Kupp 69-yard pass from Matthew Stafford (Joshua Karty kick), 14:10. Rams 21–10. **Drive: 2 plays, 70 yards, 0:50.**
- NE – Joey Slye 25-yard field goal, 7:02. Rams 21–13. **Drive: 13 plays, 63 yards, 7:08.**
- LAR – Colby Parkinson 19-yard pass from Matthew Stafford (Joshua Karty kick), 3:30. Rams 28–13. **Drive: 7 plays, 72 yards, 3:32.**

**Fourth quarter**

- NE – Vederian Lowe 4-yard pass from Drake Maye (kick blocked), 12:45. Rams 28–19. **Drive: 10 plays, 70 yards, 5:45.**
- NE – Joey Slye 42-yard field goal, 4:54. Rams 28–22. **Drive: 13 plays, 66 yards, 6:09.**

**Top passers**

- LAR – Matthew Stafford – 18/27, 295 yards, 4 TD
- NE – Drake Maye – 30/40, 282 yards, 2 TD, INT

**Top rushers**

- LAR – Kyren Williams – 15 rushes, 86 yards
- NE – Rhamondre Stevenson – 20 rushes, 73 yards

**Top receivers**

- LAR – Puka Nacua – 7 receptions, 123 yards, TD
- NE – Kendrick Bourne – 5 receptions, 70 yards, TD

The Patriots drop to 3–8 while losing their second game against the Rams since 2020. Their last win against them being Super Bowl LIII. This was the Pats' first home loss to the Rams since 2001, back when the Rams were in St. Louis.

==== Week 12: at Miami Dolphins ====
Week 12: New England Patriots at Miami Dolphins – Game summary

Quarter	1	2	3	4	Total
Patriots	0	0	0	15	**15**
**Dolphins**	0	24	7	3	**34**

at Hard Rock Stadium, Miami Gardens, Florida

- Date: November 24
- Game time: 1:00 p.m. EST
- Game weather: Sunny, 77 °F (25 °C)
- Game attendance: 65,479
- Referee: Alan Eck
- TV announcers (CBS): Spero Dedes, Adam Archuleta, and Aditi Kinkhabwala
- Recap, Game Book

Game information

**First quarter**

- No scoring plays.

**Second quarter**

- MIA – Jonnu Smith 7-yard pass from Tua Tagovailoa (Jason Sanders kick), 14:10. Dolphins 7–0. **Drive: 8 plays, 65 yards, 3:57.**
- MIA – De'Von Achane 9-yard pass from Tua Tagovailoa (Jason Sanders kick), 7:50. Dolphins 14–0. **Drive: 9 plays, 66 yards, 4:47.**
- MIA – De'Von Achane 11-yard pass from Tua Tagovailoa (Jason Sanders kick), 1:50. Dolphins 21–0. **Drive: 10 plays, 80 yards, 4:13.**
- MIA – Jason Sanders 21-yard field goal, 0:02. Dolphins 24–0. **Drive: 7 plays, 56 yards, 1:26.**

**Third quarter**

- MIA – Jaylen Waddle 23-yard pass from Tua Tagovailoa (Jason Sanders kick), 1:37. Dolphins 31–0. **Drive: 2 plays, 25 yards, 0:42.**

**Fourth quarter**

- NE – Austin Hooper 38-yard pass from Drake Maye (Joey Slye kick), 13:43. Dolphins 31–7. **Drive: 8 plays, 70 yards, 2:54.**
- NE – Christian Gonzalez 63-yard fumble return (Drake Maye–Rhamondre Stevenson pass), 10:10. Dolphins 31–15.
- MIA – Jason Sanders 51-yard field goal, 3:33. Dolphins 34–15. **Drive: 6 plays, 21 yards, 1:40.**

**Top passers**

- NE – Drake Maye – 22/37, 221 yards, TD, INT
- MIA – Tua Tagovailoa – 29/40, 317 yards, 4 TD

**Top rushers**

- NE – Antonio Gibson – 6 rushes, 30 yards
- MIA – De'Von Achane – 10 rushes, 32 yards

**Top receivers**

- NE – Demario Douglas – 5 receptions, 61 yards
- MIA – Jaylen Waddle – 8 receptions, 144 yards, TD

The Patriots were swept by the Dolphins for the second year in a row, dropping their record to 3–9 overall. This was also New England's fifth straight loss in Miami.

==== Week 13: vs. Indianapolis Colts ====
Week 13: Indianapolis Colts at New England Patriots – Game summary

Quarter	1	2	3	4	Total
**Colts**	7	7	3	8	**25**
Patriots	6	10	0	8	**24**

at Gillette Stadium, Foxborough, Massachusetts

- Date: December 1
- Game time: 1:00 p.m. EST
- Game weather: Sunny, 36 °F (2 °C)
- Game attendance: 64,626
- Referee: Adrian Hill
- TV announcers (CBS): Spero Dedes, Adam Archuleta, and Aditi Kinkhabwala
- Recap, Game Book

Game information

**First quarter**

- NE – Joey Slye 35-yard field goal, 9:12. Patriots 3–0. **Drive: 11 plays, 60 yards, 5:48.**
- IND – Jonathan Taylor 7-yard pass from Anthony Richardson (Matt Gay kick), 5:02. Colts 7–3. **Drive: 8 plays, 71 yards, 4:10.**
- NE – Joey Slye 31-yard field goal, 0:43. Colts 7–6. **Drive: 8 plays, 57 yards, 4:19.**

**Second quarter**

- NE – Joey Slye 54-yard field goal, 12:49. Patriots 9–7. **Drive: 4 plays, 6 yards, 2:11.**
- IND – Anthony Richardson 3-yard run (Matt Gay kick), 8:36. Colts 14–9. **Drive: 8 plays, 70 yards, 4:13.**
- NE – Austin Hooper 16-yard pass from Drake Maye (Joey Slye kick), 4:02. Patriots 16–14. **Drive: 8 plays, 70 yards, 4:34.**

**Third quarter**

- IND – Matt Gay 25-yard field goal, 7:26. Colts 17–16. **Drive: 13 plays, 68 yards, 7:34.**

**Fourth quarter**

- NE – Antonio Gibson 11-yard run (Drake Maye–Kayshon Boutte pass), 8:43. Patriots 24–17. **Drive: 9 plays, 54 yards, 5:31.**
- IND – Alec Pierce 3-yard pass from Anthony Richardson (Anthony Richardson run), 0:12. Colts 25–24. **Drive: 19 plays, 80 yards, 5:22.**

**Top passers**

- IND – Anthony Richardson – 12/24, 109 yards, 2 TD, 2 INT
- NE – Drake Maye – 24/30, 238 yards, TD, INT

**Top rushers**

- IND – Jonathan Taylor – 25 rushes, 96 yards
- NE – Rhamondre Stevenson – 18 rushes, 73 yards

**Top receivers**

- IND – Michael Pittman Jr. – 5 receptions, 42 yards
- NE – Hunter Henry – 7 receptions, 75 yards

A last-second 68-yard FG attempt by Joey Slye of the Pats fell short as they suffered their first home loss to the Colts in 18 years, not counting the neutral-site game in Frankfurt the previous season. As a result, the loss, alongside Houston's win over Jacksonville, eliminated the Patriots from playoff contention for the third year in a row. It also meant the Patriots were swept by the AFC South.

==== Week 15: at Arizona Cardinals ====
Week 15: New England Patriots at Arizona Cardinals – Game summary

Quarter	1	2	3	4	Total
Patriots	0	3	0	14	**17**
**Cardinals**	10	3	3	14	**30**

at State Farm Stadium, Glendale, Arizona

- Date: December 15
- Game time: 4:25 p.m. EST/2:25 p.m. MST
- Game weather: Sunny, 68 °F (20 °C) (retractable roof open)
- Game attendance: 64,135
- Referee: Ronald Torbert
- TV announcers (CBS): Tom McCarthy, Jay Feely, Ross Tucker and Amanda Balionis
- Recap, Game Book

Game information

**First quarter**

- ARI – Chad Ryland 49-yard field goal, 7:13. Cardinals 3–0. **Drive: 6 plays, 26 yards, 3:26.**
- ARI – Jonah Williams fumble recovery in the endzone (Chad Ryland kick), 1:21. Cardinals 10–0. **Drive: 6 plays, 80 yards, 3:37.**

**Second quarter**

- NE – Joey Slye 50-yard field goal, 2:01. Cardinals 10–3. **Drive: 12 plays, 48 yards, 7:30.**
- ARI – Chad Ryland 35-yard field goal, 0:16. Cardinals 13–3. **Drive: 10 plays, 53 yards, 1:45.**

**Third quarter**

- ARI – Chad Ryland 40-yard field goal, 9:07. Cardinals 16–3. **Drive: 10 plays, 49 yards, 5:53.**

**Fourth quarter**

- ARI – James Conner 1-yard run (Chad Ryland kick), 10:39. Cardinals 23–3. **Drive: 9 plays, 55 yards, 4:52.**
- NE – Demario Douglas 3-yard pass from Drake Maye (Joey Slye kick), 8:14. Cardinals 23–10. **Drive: 6 plays, 75 yards, 2:25.**
- ARI – James Conner 1-yard run (Chad Ryland kick), 3:27. Cardinals 30–10. **Drive: 9 plays, 70 yards, 4:47.**
- NE – Drake Maye 5-yard run (Joey Slye kick), 1:55. Cardinals 30–17. **Drive: 6 plays, 70 yards, 1:32.**

**Top passers**

- NE – Drake Maye – 19/23, 202 yards, TD, INT
- ARI – Kyler Murray – 23/30, 224 yards

**Top rushers**

- NE – Rhamondre Stevenson – 13 rushes, 69 yards
- ARI – James Conner – 16 rushes, 110 yards, 2 TD

**Top receivers**

- NE – Kendrick Bourne – 3 receptions, 44 yards
- ARI – Trey McBride – 9 receptions, 87 yards

The loss marked the Patriots first loss to the Cardinals since 2012 snapping a three-game winning streak against them. It was also the first time since 1991 that they lost to the Cardinals on the road. New England fell to 3–11 and they were swept by the NFC West and 1–4 against the NFC.

==== Week 16: at Buffalo Bills ====
Week 16: New England Patriots at Buffalo Bills – Game summary

Quarter	1	2	3	4	Total
Patriots	7	7	0	7	**21**
**Bills**	0	7	10	7	**24**

at Highmark Stadium, Orchard Park, New York

- Date: December 22
- Game time: 4:25 p.m. EST
- Game weather: Sunny, 14 °F (−10 °C)
- Game attendance: 70,725
- Referee: Brad Allen
- TV announcers (CBS): Ian Eagle, Charles Davis and Evan Washburn
- Recap, Game Book

Game information

**First quarter**

- NE – Kayshon Boutte 28-yard pass from Drake Maye (Joey Slye kick), 12:01. Patriots 7–0. **Drive: 6 plays, 58 yards, 2:59.**

**Second quarter**

- NE – Rhamondre Stevenson 14-yard run (Joey Slye kick), 14:16. Patriots 14–0. **Drive: 16 plays, 91 yards, 9:57.**
- BUF – James Cook 46-yard run (Tyler Bass kick), 11:56. Patriots 14–7. **Drive: 4 plays, 70 yards, 2:20.**

**Third quarter**

- BUF – James Cook 4-yard pass from Josh Allen (Tyler Bass kick), 9:41. Tied 14–14. **Drive: 9 plays, 68 yards, 5:19.**
- BUF – Tyler Bass 50-yard field goal, 6:02. Bills 17–14. **Drive: 6 plays, 10 yards, 3:02.**

**Fourth quarter**

- BUF – Taron Johnson fumble recovery in the end zone (Tyler Bass kick), 10:10. Bills 24–14.
- NE – Hunter Henry 9-yard pass from Drake Maye (Joey Slye kick), 1:13. Bills 24–21. **Drive: 13 plays, 75 yards, 3:16.**

**Top passers**

- NE – Drake Maye – 22/36, 260 yards, 2 TD, INT
- BUF – Josh Allen – 16/29, 154 yards, TD, INT

**Top rushers**

- NE – Rhamondre Stevenson – 12 rushes, 60 yards, TD
- BUF – James Cook – 11 rushes, 100 yards, TD

**Top receivers**

- NE – Kayshon Boutte – 5 receptions, 95 yards, TD
- BUF – James Cook – 3 receptions, 26 yards, TD

Despite holding a 14–0 lead, the Bills would outscore the Patriots 24–7 for the rest of the game. This was the Pats' 4th loss in Buffalo since the 2021 Wild Card. New England finished 2–7 on the road.

==== Week 17: vs. Los Angeles Chargers ====
Week 17: Los Angeles Chargers at New England Patriots – Game summary

Quarter	1	2	3	4	Total
**Chargers**	7	13	10	10	**40**
Patriots	0	7	0	0	**7**

at Gillette Stadium, Foxborough, Massachusetts

- Date: December 28
- Game time: 1:00 p.m. EST
- Game weather: Mostly cloudy, 40 °F (4 °C)
- Game attendance: 64,628
- Referee: John Hussey
- TV announcers (WCVB/NFLN): Chris Rose, Ross Tucker and Steve Wyche
  Game exclusive to WCVB through syndication. Out of market on the NFL Network.
- Recap, Game Book

Game information

**First quarter**

- LAC – Derius Davis 23-yard pass from Justin Herbert (Cameron Dicker kick), 3:21. Chargers 7–0. **Drive: 11 plays, 91 yards, 6:12.**

**Second quarter**

- LAC – Cameron Dicker 27-yard field goal, 10:15. Chargers 10–0. **Drive: 12 plays, 67 yards, 6:43.**
- LAC – Ladd McConkey 6-yard pass from Justin Herbert (Cameron Dicker kick), 2:55. Chargers 17–0. **Drive: 9 plays, 44 yards, 5:40.**
- NE – Demario Douglas 36-yard pass from Drake Maye (Joey Slye kick), 1:24. Chargers 17–7. **Drive: 5 plays, 73 yards, 1:31.**
- LAC – Cameron Dicker 38-yard field goal, 0:02. Chargers 20–7. **Drive: 8 plays, 50 yards, 1:22.**

**Third quarter**

- LAC – Ladd McConkey 40-yard pass from Justin Herbert (Cameron Dicker kick), 7:37. Chargers 27–7. **Drive: 10 plays, 94 yards, 5:20.**
- LAC – Cameron Dicker 41-yard field goal, 5:43. Chargers 30–7. **Drive: 4 plays, 0 yards, 0:19.**

**Fourth quarter**

- LAC – J. K. Dobbins 2-yard run (Cameron Dicker kick), 11:58. Chargers 37–7. **Drive: 10 plays, 63 yards, 5:20.**
- LAC – Cameron Dicker 35-yard field goal, 3:47. Chargers 40–7. **Drive: 4 plays, 9 yards, 1:38.**

**Top passers**

- LAC – Justin Herbert – 26/38, 283 yards, 3 TD
- NE – Drake Maye – 12/22, 117 yards, TD

**Top rushers**

- LAC – J. K. Dobbins – 19 rushes, 76 yards, TD
- NE – Antonio Gibson – 12 rushes, 63 yards

**Top receivers**

- LAC – Ladd McConkey – 8 receptions, 94 yards, 2 TD
- NE – Demario Douglas – 4 receptions, 46 yards, TD

With their second loss in a row to the Chargers, the Patriots dropped to 3–13. This is their first back-to-back 13-loss campaign in franchise history. In addition, with the Giants win over the Colts, the Pats dropped to dead last in the NFL with their 2nd six-game losing streak.

==== Week 18: vs. Buffalo Bills ====
Week 18: Buffalo Bills at New England Patriots – Game summary

Quarter	1	2	3	4	Total
Bills	0	10	6	0	**16**
**Patriots**	7	7	3	6	**23**

at Gillette Stadium, Foxborough, Massachusetts

- Date: January 5
- Game time: 1:00 p.m. EST
- Game weather: Cloudy, 33 °F (1 °C)
- Game attendance: 64,626
- Referee: Alan Eck
- TV announcers (CBS): Spero Dedes, Adam Archuleta and Aditi Kinkhabwala
- Recap, Game Book

Game information

**First quarter**

- NE – Joe Milton III 1-yard run (Joey Slye kick), 4:25. Patriots 7–0. **Drive: 13 plays, 55 yards, 7:18.**

**Second quarter**

- BUF – Ray Davis 2-yard pass from Mitch Trubisky (Tyler Bass kick), 12:09. Tied 7–7. **Drive: 13 plays, 75 yards, 7:16.**
- NE – Kayshon Boutte 48-yard pass from Joe Milton III (Joey Slye kick), 9:10. Patriots 14–7. **Drive: 5 plays, 70 yards, 2:59.**
- BUF – Tyler Bass 49-yard field goal, 4:39. Patriots 14–10. **Drive: 8 plays, 39 yards, 4:31.**

**Third quarter**

- BUF – James Cook 1-yard run (kick failed), 7:56. Bills 16–14. **Drive: 5 plays, 16 yards, 2:21.**
- NE – Joey Slye 41-yard field goal, 1:00. Patriots 17–16. **Drive: 12 plays, 54 yards, 6:56.**

**Fourth quarter**

- NE – Joey Slye 42-yard field goal, 8:53. Patriots 20–16. **Drive: 11 plays, 55 yards, 5:09.**
- NE – Joey Slye 50-yard field goal, 1:55. Patriots 23–16. **Drive: 6 plays, 14 yards, 1:19.**

**Top passers**

- BUF – Mitch Trubisky – 15/21, 101 yards, TD
- NE – Joe Milton III – 22/29, 241 yards, TD

**Top rushers**

- BUF – Ray Davis – 15 rushes, 64 yards
- NE – Antonio Gibson – 12 rushes, 41 yards

**Top receivers**

- BUF – Curtis Samuel – 7 receptions, 52 yards
- NE – Kayshon Boutte – 7 receptions, 117 yards, TD

With the win, the Patriots snap their six game losing streak, while securing their first home win in 10 weeks, and finish 4–13 for the second straight year. However, thanks to the Jets's win over Miami, the Patriots finished dead last in the AFC East in back-to-back years for the first time since 1999–2000. Jerod Mayo was fired shortly after the game. New England finished the season 2–4 against the AFC East and 2–6 at home.

=== Standings ===
==== Division ====
AFC East
	W	L	T	PCT	DIV	CONF	PF	PA	STK
^{(2)} Buffalo Bills	13	4	0	.765	5–1	9–3	525	368	L1
Miami Dolphins	8	9	0	.471	3–3	6–6	345	364	L1
New York Jets	5	12	0	.294	2–4	5–7	338	404	W1
New England Patriots	4	13	0	.235	2–4	3–9	289	417	W1

==== Conference ====
AFC
Seed	Team	Division	W	L	T	PCT	DIV	CONF	SOS	SOV	STK
**Division leaders**
1	Kansas City Chiefs	West	15	2	0	.882	5–1	10–2	.488	.463	L1
2	Buffalo Bills	East	13	4	0	.765	5–1	9–3	.467	.448	L1
3	Baltimore Ravens	North	12	5	0	.706	4–2	8–4	.529	.525	W4
4	Houston Texans	South	10	7	0	.588	5–1	8–4	.481	.376	W1
**Wild cards**
5	Los Angeles Chargers	West	11	6	0	.647	4–2	8–4	.467	.348	W3
6 (Note: Pittsburgh clinched the #6 seed over Denver based on head-to-head victory.)	Pittsburgh Steelers	North	10	7	0	.588	3–3	7–5	.502	.453	L4
7	Denver Broncos	West	10	7	0	.588	3–3	6–6	.502	.394	W1
**Did not qualify for the postseason**
8	Cincinnati Bengals	North	9	8	0	.529	3–3	6–6	.478	.314	W5
9 (Note: Indianapolis finished ahead of Miami based on head-to-head victory.)	Indianapolis Colts	South	8	9	0	.471	3–3	7–5	.457	.309	W1
10	Miami Dolphins	East	8	9	0	.471	3–3	6–6	.419	.294	L1
11	New York Jets	East	5	12	0	.294	2–4	5–7	.495	.341	W1
12 (Note: Jacksonville finished ahead of New England and Las Vegas based on conference record. (Jacksonville 4–8 to New England 3–9 to Las Vegas 3–9))	Jacksonville Jaguars	South	4	13	0	.235	3–3	4–8	.478	.265	L1
13 (Note: New England finished ahead of Las Vegas based on strength of victory. (New England .471 to Las Vegas .353))	New England Patriots	East	4	13	0	.235	2–4	3–9	.471	.471	W1
14	Las Vegas Raiders	West	4	13	0	.235	0–6	3–9	.540	.353	L1
15 (Note: Cleveland finished ahead of Tennessee based on strength of victory. (Cleveland .510 to Tennessee .431))	Cleveland Browns	North	3	14	0	.176	2–4	3–9	.536	.510	L6
16	Tennessee Titans	South	3	14	0	.176	1–5	3–9	.522	.431	L6
**Tiebreakers** (Note: When breaking ties for three or more teams under the NFL's rules, they are first broken within divisions, then comparing only the highest ranked remaining team from each division.)
