= List of New England Patriots first-round draft picks =

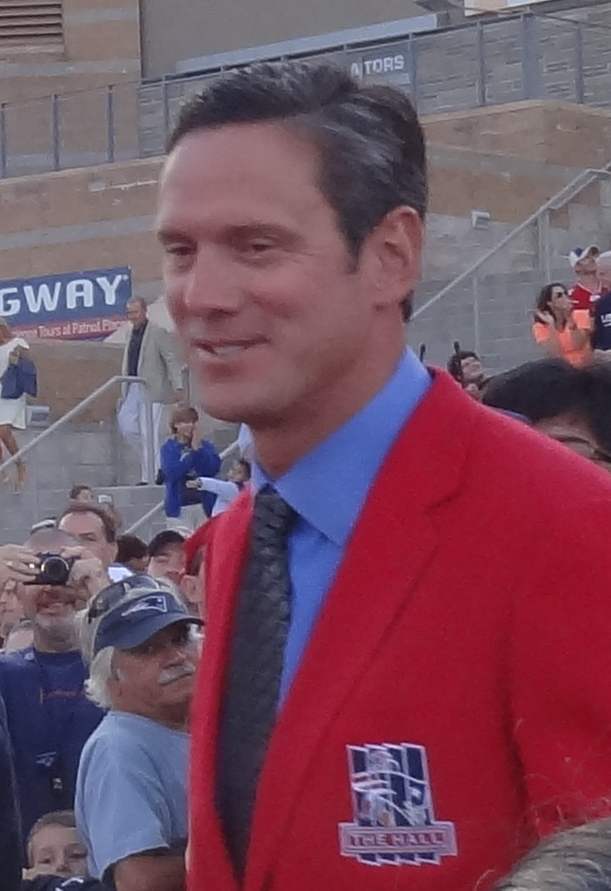
Quarterback Drew Bledsoe, drafted in 1993, was the most recent Patriots player to be drafted first overall. He spent nine seasons with the team, during which time he was a four-time Pro Bowler and led the league in passing once. He is a member of the New England Patriots Hall of Fame.

The New England Patriots are a professional American football team based in the Greater Boston metropolitan area. The Patriots compete in the National Football League (NFL) as a member of the American Football Conference East Division. Founded in 1959 as the Boston Patriots, they were a charter member of the American Football League (AFL) and joined the NFL in 1970 following the AFL–NFL merger. The Patriots played their home games at various stadiums throughout Boston, including Fenway Park from 1963 to 1969, until the franchise moved to Foxborough in 1971. As part of the move, the team changed its name to the New England Patriots. Home games were played at Foxboro Stadium until 2002 when the stadium was demolished alongside the opening of Gillette Stadium. The team began utilizing Gillette Stadium for home games the same year.

The NFL draft, officially known as the "NFL Annual Player Selection Meeting", is an annual event which serves as the league's most common source of player recruitment. The draft order is determined based on the previous season's standings; the teams with the worst win–loss records receive the earliest picks. Teams that qualified for the NFL playoffs select after non-qualifiers, and their order depends on how far they advanced, using their regular season record as a tie-breaker. The final two selections in the first round are reserved for the Super Bowl runner-up and champion. Draft picks are tradable and players or other picks can be acquired with them.

Before the merger agreements in 1966, the AFL directly competed with the NFL and held a separate draft. This led to a bidding war over top prospects between the two leagues, along with the subsequent drafting of the same player in each draft. As part of the merger agreement on June 8, 1966, the two leagues began holding a multiple round "common draft". Once the AFL officially merged with the NFL in 1970, the "common draft" simply became the NFL draft. The first AFL draft was held prior to the start of the 1960 season. The first round of the 1960 AFL draft was territorial selections. Each team received a "territorial pick" which allowed them to select a single player within a pre-agreed upon designated region (the team's "territory"). Teams then agreed on the top eight players at each position, who were subsequently assigned to teams by random draw, with each of the eight teams receiving one of those players. This process was repeated until all 53 roster spots were filled. Beginning in the 1961 draft, the AFL, using the same system as the NFL, began to assign picks based on the previous season's standings.

Since the team's first draft, the Patriots have selected 73 players in the first round. The team's first-round pick in the inaugural AFL draft was Gerhard Schwedes, a halfback out of Syracuse; he was the team's territorial selection. The Patriots have selected first overall five times, drafting Jack Concannon in 1964, Jim Plunkett in 1971, Kenneth Sims in 1982, Irving Fryar in 1984, and Drew Bledsoe in 1993. In the most recent draft, held in 2026, the Patriots selected Utah offensive tackle Caleb Lomu.

The Patriots did not draft a player in the first round on eight occasions. Four of the team's first-round picks—John Hannah, Mike Haynes, Ty Law, and Richard Seymour—have been inducted into the Pro Football Hall of Fame. The Patriots used four first-round picks in the 1960s to select players—Gary Collins, Jack Concannon, Tommy Mason, and Jerry Rush—who chose to sign with the NFL instead.

== Player selections ==
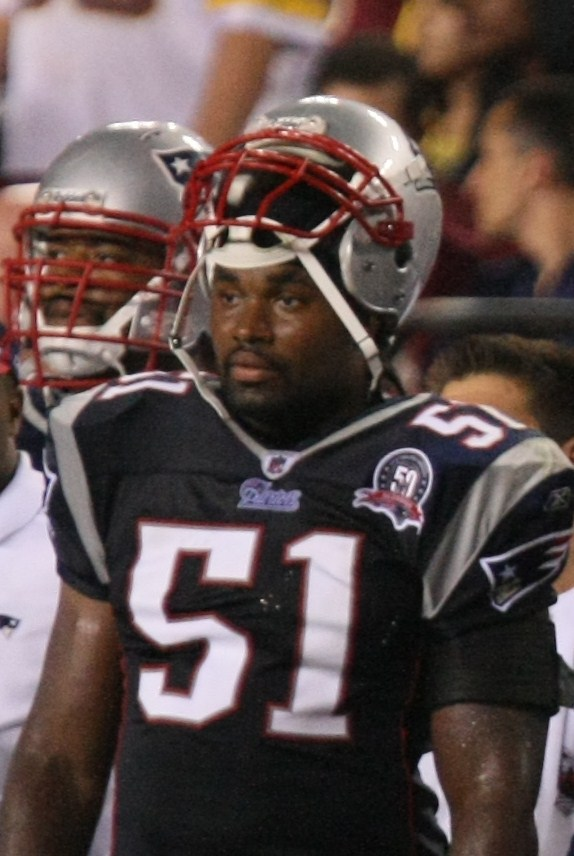
Linebacker Jerod Mayo was drafted tenth-overall in the 2008 NFL draft. He was a first-team All-Pro, two-time Pro Bowler, and the Defensive Rookie of the Year in 2008. Mayo was the head coach of the Patriots for the 2024 season, and spent his entire playing and coaching career with the team up until 2024.

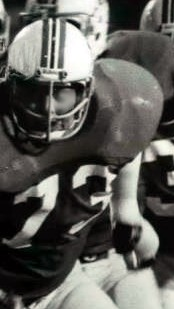
Guard John Hannah, drafted in 1973, spent his entire career with the Patriots. During his 13 seasons with the team, he was a seven-time first-team All-Pro and nine-time Pro Bowler. Hannah was elected into the Pro Football Hall of Fame in 1991 and made the NFL 100th Anniversary All-Time Team.

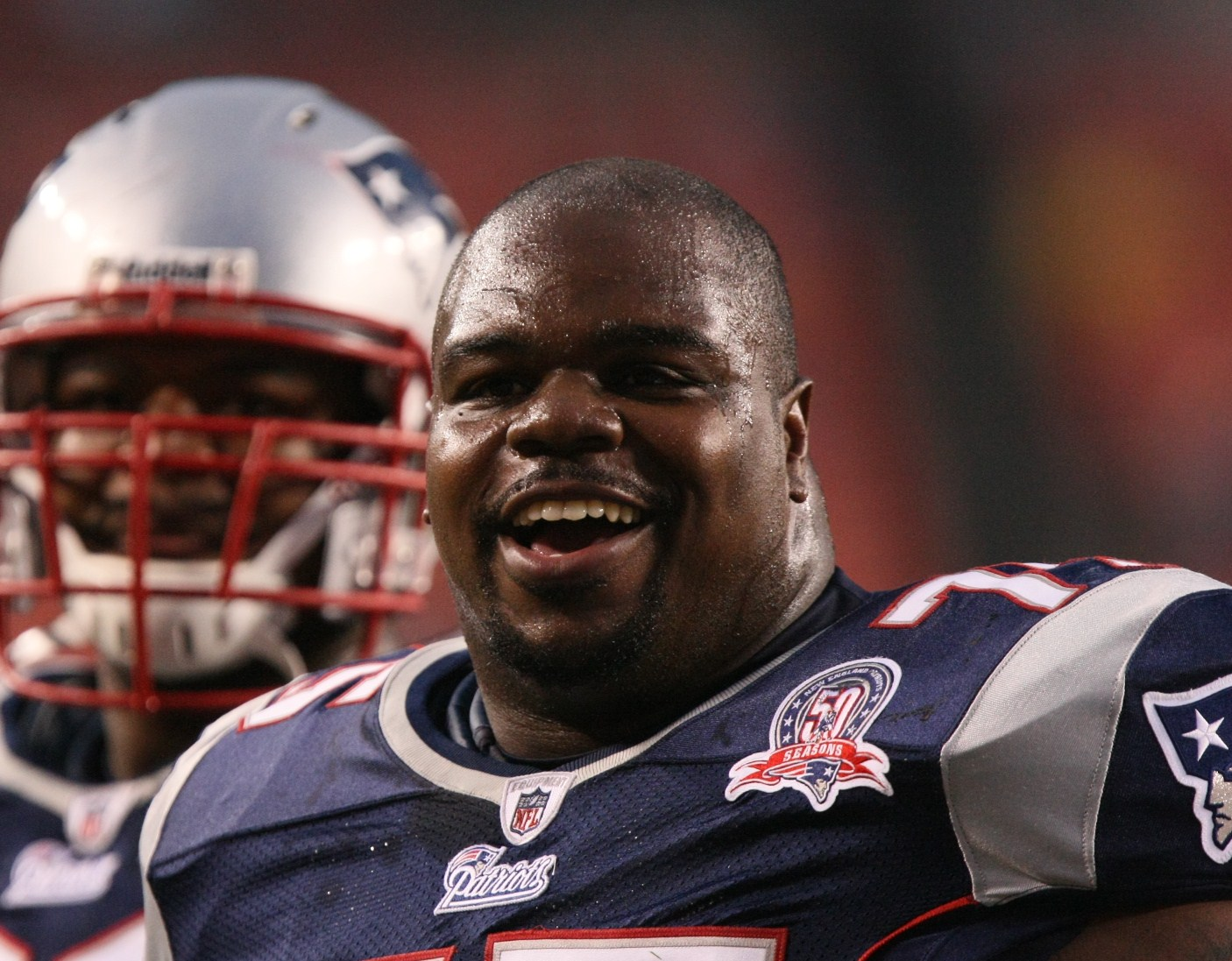
Vince Wilfork, a nose tackle drafted 21st overall in the 2004 NFL draft, played for the Patriots for eleven seasons. During that time he was a five-time All-Pro and five-time Pro Bowler. Wilfork is honored in the New England Patriots Hall of Fame.

Key
Symbol	Meaning
†	Inducted into the Pro Football Hall of Fame
*	Selected number one overall

Position abbreviations
C	Center
CB	Cornerback
DB	Defensive back
DE	Defensive end
DT	Defensive tackle
FL	Flanker
G	Guard
HB	Halfback
LB	Linebacker
NT	Nose tackle
QB	Quarterback
RB	Running back
T	Tackle
TE	Tight end
WR	Wide receiver

New England Patriots (Note: The New England Patriots were previously known as the Boston Patriots (1960–1970).) first-round draft picks
Season	Pick	Player	Position	College	Notes
1960	Territorial	Gerhard Schwedes	HB	Syracuse	First round was territorial selections (Note: The first round of the 1960 AFL draft was territorial selections. Teams were allowed to select a single player from a designated region (their "territory").)
1961	2	Tommy Mason	RB	Tulane	Signed for the NFL's Minnesota Vikings instead
1962	6	Gary Collins	FL	Maryland	Signed for the NFL's Cleveland Browns instead
1963	7	Art Graham	WR	Boston College	
1964	1	Jack Concannon*	QB	Boston College	Moved up draft order in trade with Denver Broncos. (Note: New England traded their 1964 first- and third-round selections (Nos. 4 and 20 overall) and a player to the Denver Broncos in exchange for their 1964 first-round selection (No. 1 overall).) Signed for the NFL's Philadelphia Eagles instead.
1965	7	Jerry Rush	DT	Michigan State	Signed for the NFL's Detroit Lions instead
1966	3	Karl Singer	T	Purdue	
1967	21	John Charles	DB	Purdue	
1968	6	Dennis Byrd	DE	NC State	
1969	6	Ron Sellers	WR	Florida State	
1970	4	Phil Olsen	DT	Utah State	
1971	1	Jim Plunkett*	QB	Stanford	
1972	No pick				Original pick sent to Minnesota Vikings. (Note: New England traded defensive back John Charles and their 1972 first-round selection (No. 10 overall) to the Minnesota Vikings in exchange for the right to sign free agent quarterback Joe Kapp.) Pick received from Los Angeles Rams (Note: New England received a 1972 first-round selection (No. 17 overall) from the Los Angeles Rams as compensation for free agent defensive lineman Phil Olsen.) and traded to New York Giants. (Note: New England traded defensive end Fred Dryer to the New York Giants in exchange for their 1972 first- and sixth-round selections (Nos. 17 and 140 overall) and 1973 second-round selection (No. 30 overall).)
1973	4	John Hannah†	G	Alabama	
1973	11	Sam Cunningham	RB	USC	Pick received from Los Angeles Rams (Note: New England traded defensive end Fred Dryer to the Los Angeles Rams in exchange for their 1973 first-round selection (No. 11 overall) and defensive lineman Rick Cash.)
1973	19	Darryl Stingley	WR	Purdue	Pick received from Chicago Bears (Note: New England traded running back Carl Garrett to the Chicago Bears in exchange for their 1973 first-round selection (No. 19 overall).)
1974	No pick				Pick traded to San Francisco 49ers (Note: New England traded their 1974 first-round selection (No. 9 overall) to the San Francisco 49ers in exchange for tight end Bob Windsor.)
1975	16	Russ Francis	TE	Oregon	
1976	5	Mike Haynes†	CB	Arizona State	
1976	12	Pete Brock	C	Colorado	Pick received from San Francisco 49ers (Note: New England traded quarterback Jim Plunkett to the San Francisco 49ers in exchange for their two 1976 first-round selections (Nos. 12 and 21 overall), 1977 first- and second-round selections (Nos. 16 and 44 overall), and quarterback Tom Owen.)
1976	21	Tim Fox	DB	Ohio State	Pick received from San Francisco 49ers
1977	16	Raymond Clayborn	CB	Texas	Pick received from San Francisco 49ers
1977	25	Stanley Morgan	WR	Tennessee	
1978	18	Bob Cryder	G	Alabama	
1979	25	Rick Sanford	DB	South Carolina	
1980	14	Roland James	DB	Tennessee	
1980	25	Vagas Ferguson	RB	Notre Dame	Pick received from Houston Oilers (Note: New England traded offensive tackle Leon Gray to the Houston Oilers in exchange for their 1980 first- and sixth-round selections (Nos. 25 and 160 overall).)
1981	19	Brian Holloway	T	Stanford	
1982	1	Kenneth Sims*	DE	Texas	
1982	27	Lester Williams	NT	Miami (FL)	Pick received from San Francisco 49ers (Note: New England traded their 1982 second-round selection (No. 29 overall) and tight end Russ Francis to the San Francisco 49ers in exchange for their 1982 first-, fourth-, and two second-round selections (Nos. 27, 42, 55, and 111 overall).)
1983	15	Tony Eason	QB	Illinois	
1984	1	Irving Fryar*	WR	Nebraska	Moved up draft order in trade with Cincinnati Bengals (Note: New England traded two 1984 first-round selections, a tenth-round selection (Nos. 16, 28, received from Los Angeles Raiders, (Note: New England traded cornerback Mike Haynes to the Los Angeles Raiders in exchange for their 1984 first-round selection (No. 28 overall) and 1985 second-round selection (No. 52 overall).) and 265 overall), and a 1985 fifth-round selection (No. 129 overall) to the Cincinnati Bengals in exchange for their 1984 first-round selection (No. 1 overall).) using pick received from Los Angeles Raiders
1985	28	Trevor Matich	C	BYU	Moved down draft order in trade with San Francisco 49ers (Note: New England traded their 1985 first- and third-round selections (Nos. 16 and 75 overall) to the San Francisco 49ers in exchange for their 1985 first-, second-, and third-round selections (Nos. 28, 56, and 84 overall).)
1986	26	Reggie Dupard	RB	SMU	
1987	23	Bruce Armstrong	T	Louisville	
1988	17	John Stephens	RB	Northwestern State	
1989	16	Hart Lee Dykes	WR	Oklahoma State	
1990	8	Chris Singleton	LB	Arizona	Moved down draft order in trade with Seattle Seahawks (Note: New England traded their 1990 first- and second-round selections (Nos. 3 and 29 overall) to the Seattle Seahawks in exchange for their 1990 third- and two first-round selections (Nos. 8, 10, and 64 overall) and 1991 fourth-round selection (No. 101 overall).)
1990	10	Ray Agnew	DE	NC State	Pick received from Seattle Seahawks
1991	11	Pat Harlow	T	USC	Moved down draft order in trade with Dallas Cowboys (Note: New England traded their 1991 first-round selection (No. 1 overall) to the Dallas Cowboys in exchange for their 1991 first- and second-round selections (Nos. 11 and 41 overall), cornerback Ron Francis, linebacker David Howard, and linebacker Eugene Lockhart.)
1991	14	Leonard Russell	RB	Arizona State	Moved up draft order in trades with Houston Oilers (Note: New England traded their 1991 second- and fourth-round selections (Nos. 28 and 101 overall) to the Houston Oilers in exchange for their 1991 first-round selection (No. 17 overall).) and Dallas Cowboys (Note: New England traded a 1991 first-, received from the Houston Oilers, and fourth-round selection (Nos. 17 and 110 overall) to the Dallas Cowboys in exchange for their 1991 first-round selection (No. 14 overall).)
1992	13	Eugene Chung	G	Virginia Tech	Moved down draft order in trade with Atlanta Falcons (Note: New England traded their 1992 first-round selection (No. 8 overall) to the Atlanta Falcons in exchange for their 1992 first-, second, and fourth-round selections (Nos. 19, 46, and 104 overall).) then up draft order in trade with Dallas Cowboys (Note: New England traded their 1992 first- and fourth-, received from the Atlanta Falcons, and second-round selections (Nos. 19, 37, and 104 overall) to the Dallas Cowboys in exchange for their 1992 first- and third-round selections (Nos. 13 and 71 overall).)
1993	1	Drew Bledsoe*	QB	Washington State	
1994	4	Willie McGinest	DE	USC	
1995	23	Ty Law†	CB	Michigan	
1996	7	Terry Glenn	WR	Ohio State	
1997	29	Chris Canty	DB	Kansas State	
1998	18	Robert Edwards	RB	Georgia	Pick received from New York Jets (Note: New England received a 1998 first- and third-round selection (Nos. 18 and 81 overall) from the New York Jets as compensation for restricted free agent running back Curtis Martin.)
1998	22	Tebucky Jones	DB	Syracuse	
1999	17	Damien Woody	C	Boston College	Moved up draft order in trade with Seattle Seahawks (Note: New England traded their 1999 first-, third-, and sixth-round selections (Nos. 20, 82, and 191 overall) to the Seattle Seahawks in exchange for their 1999 first-round selection (No. 17 overall).)
1999	28	Andy Katzenmoyer	LB	Ohio State	Pick received from New York Jets (Note: New England received a 1997 third- and fourth-round selection (Nos. 61 and 97 overall), 1998 second-round selection (No. 52 overall), and 1999 first-round selection (No. 28 overall) from the New York Jets as compensation for head coach Bill Parcells.)
2000	No pick				Pick traded to New York Jets (Note: New England traded a 2000 first-round selection (No. 16 overall) and 2001 fourth- and seventh-round selections (Nos. 101 and 206 overall) to the New York Jets in exchange for their 2001 fifth-round selection (No. 149 overall), 2002 seventh-round selection (No. 234 overall), and for the rights to sign head coach Bill Belichick.)
2001	6	Richard Seymour†	DE	Georgia	
2002	21	Daniel Graham	TE	Colorado	Moved up draft order in trade with Washington Redskins (Note: New England traded their 2002 first-, third, and seventh-round selections (Nos. 32, 96, and 234 overall) to the Washington Redskins in exchange for their 2002 first-round selection (No. 21 overall).)
2003	13	Ty Warren	DE	Texas A&M	Original pick traded to Baltimore Ravens. (Note: New England traded their 2003 first-round selection (No. 19 overall) to the Baltimore Ravens in exchange for their 2003 second-round selection (No. 41 overall) and 2004 first-round selection (No. 21 overall).) Pick received from Buffalo Bills (Note: New England traded quarterback Drew Bledsoe to the Buffalo Bills in exchange for their 2002 first-round selection (No. 14 overall).) then used to move up draft order in trade with Chicago Bears. (Note: New England traded their 2003 first- and sixth-round selections (Nos. 14 and 193 overall) to the Chicago Bears in exchange for their 2003 first-round selection (No. 13 overall).)
2004	21	Vince Wilfork	NT	Miami (FL)	Pick received from Baltimore Ravens
2004	32	Benjamin Watson	TE	Georgia	
2005	32	Logan Mankins	G	Fresno State	
2006	21	Laurence Maroney	RB	Minnesota	
2007	24	Brandon Meriweather	DB	Miami (FL)	Original pick traded to San Francisco 49ers. (Note: New England traded a 2007 first-round selection to the San Francisco 49ers in exchange for their 2007 fourth-round selection (No. 110 overall) and 2008 first-round selection (No. 7 overall).) Pick received from Seattle Seahawks. (Note: New England traded wide receiver Deion Branch to the Seattle Seahawks in exchange for their 2007 first-round selection (No. 24 overall).)
2008	10	Jerod Mayo	LB	Tennessee	Original pick forfeited. Pick received from San Francisco 49ers.
2009	No pick				Moved down draft order in trades with Baltimore Ravens (Note: New England traded their 2009 first-round selection (No. 23 overall) to the Baltimore Ravens in exchange for their 2009 first- and fifth-round selections (Nos. 26 and 162 overall).) and Green Bay Packers (Note: New England traded a 2009 first- and fifth-round selection (Nos. 26 and 162 overall, received from the Baltimore Ravens) to the Green Bay Packers in exchange for their 2009 second- and two third-round selections (Nos. 41, 73, and 83 overall).)
2010	27	Devin McCourty	DB	Rutgers	Moved down draft order in trades with Denver Broncos (Note: New England traded 2010 first-round selection (No. 22 overall) to the Denver Broncos in exchange for their 2010 first- and fourth-round selections (Nos. 24 and 113 overall).) and Dallas Cowboys (Note: New England traded a 2010 first- (received from the Denver Broncos) and fourth-round selection (Nos. 24 and 119 overall) to the Dallas Cowboys in exchange for their 2010 first- and third-round selections (Nos. 27 and 90 overall).)
2011	17	Nate Solder	T	Colorado	Original pick traded to New Orleans Saints. (Note: New England traded their 2011 first-round selection (No. 28 overall) to the New Orleans Saints in exchange for their 2011 second-round selection (No. 56 overall) and 2012 first-round selection (No. 27 overall).) Pick received from Oakland Raiders. (Note: New England traded defensive lineman Richard Seymour to the Oakland Raiders in exchange for their 2011 first-round selection (No. 17 overall).)
2012	21	Chandler Jones	DE	Syracuse	
2012	25	Dont'a Hightower	LB	Alabama	Pick received from New Orleans Saints
2013	No pick				Moved down draft order in trade with Minnesota Vikings (Note: New England traded their 2013 first-round selection (No. 29 overall) to the Minnesota Vikings in exchange for their 2013 second-, third-, fourth-, and seventh-round selections (Nos. 29, 52, 83, 102, and 229 overall).)
2014	29	Dominique Easley	DT	Florida	
2015	32	Malcom Brown	DT	Texas	
2016	No pick				Pick forfeited (Note: New England was stripped of their 2016 first-round selection (No. 29 overall) and 2017 fourth-round selection (No. 118 overall) as punishment for the Deflategate scandal.)
2017	No pick				Pick traded to New Orleans Saints (Note: New England traded their 2017 first- and third-round selections (Nos. 32 and 103 overall) to the New Orleans Saints in exchange for their 2017 fourth-round selection (No. 118 overall) and wide receiver Brandin Cooks.)
2018	23	Isaiah Wynn	T	Georgia	Pick received from Los Angeles Rams (Note: New England traded wide receiver Brandin Cooks and a 2018 fourth-round selection (No. 136 overall) to the Los Angeles Rams in exchange for their 2018 first- and sixth-round selections (Nos. 23 and 198 overall).)
2018	31	Sony Michel	RB	Georgia	
2019	32	N'Keal Harry	WR	Arizona State	
2020	No pick				Moved down draft order in trade with Los Angeles Chargers (Note: New England traded their 2021 first-round selection (No. 23 overall) to the Los Angeles Chargers in exchange for their 2022 second- and third-round selections (Nos. 37 and 71 overall).)
2021	15	Mac Jones	QB	Alabama	
2022	29	Cole Strange	G	Chattanooga	Moved down draft order in trade with Kansas City Chiefs (Note: New England traded their 2022 first-round selection (No. 21 overall) to the Kansas City Chiefs in exchange for their 2022 first-, third-, and fourth-round selections (Nos. 29, 94, and 121 overall).)
2023	17	Christian Gonzalez	DB	Oregon	Moved down draft order in trade with Pittsburgh Steelers (Note: New England traded a 2023 first-round selection (No. 14 overall) to the Pittsburgh Steelers in exchange for their 2023 first- and fourth-round selections (Nos. 17 and 120 overall).)
2024	3	Drake Maye	QB	North Carolina	
2025	4	Will Campbell	T	LSU	
2026	28	Caleb Lomu	T	Utah	

== See also ==
- History of the New England Patriots
- List of New England Patriots seasons
