= Shauna Seliy =

American novelist

Shauna Seliy is an American novelist.

Born in 1970 in a suburb of Pittsburgh, Pennsylvania, Seliy graduated from Serra Catholic High School in McKeesport. She earned a Bachelor of Arts from the University of Pennsylvania and a Master of Fine Arts from the University of Massachusetts Amherst.

She has received fellowships from Yaddo and the MacDowell Colony. From 2003-2004, she was the Writer-in-Residence at St. Albans School in Washington, DC.

Seliy is currently the artist in residence in the English Department at Northwestern University.

== Works ==
Seliy's most notable work is her novel When We Get There. Published on May 21, 2007, this book tells the story of thirteen year old Lucas, an only child living in the 1970s coal town of Banning, PA. The youngest member of a large and boisterous Eastern European family, Lucas is taken care of by his grandmother, affectionately known as Slats, after his mother, Mirjana, mysteriously disappears. When Zoli, Mirjana's admirer, takes it upon himself to find his lost love, violence and conflict ensue until Lucas decides to look for his mother himself.

== Literary awards ==
Seliy has won several awards for her novel When We Get There. These awards include best book of the year by Sunday Independent, best debut of the year by Metro UK, and was a Booklist Editor's Choice in 2007.

== Literary criticism ==
Critics have praised Seliy’s ability to create an historically accurate depiction of a western Pennsylvania coal mining town. Additionally, her depiction of Zoli has been praised for allowing the audience to feel sympathy towards him, despite his being a villain. Additionally, critics have acclaimed the way in which the topic of coming of age and experiencing life-altering events is adequately brought to light in When We Get There.

== Sources ==
- Contemporary Authors Online. The Gale Group, 2008. PEN (Permanent Entry Number): 0000177886.
- Seliy, Shauna (2007). When We Get There. New York: Bloomsbury. ISBN 978-0-7432-8183-6.
- Northwestern University Department of English - http://www.english.northwestern.edu/people/seliy.html
