= When We Get There =

Book by Shauna Seliy

When We Get There (WWGT)
- First edition
- Author: Shauna Seliy
- Language: English
- Publisher: Bloomsbury
- Publication date: 2007
- Publication place: United States
- Media type: Print (hardback)
- Pages: 259
- OCLC: 77573534

When We Get There is a novel about coming-of-age by the American writer Shauna Seliy set in 1974 in western Pennsylvania. The author’s hometown of Yukon is in Westmoreland County, Pennsylvania which has coal mining history.

The novel tells the story of Lucas Lessar. His father has died in a mining accident and his mother has mysteriously disappeared, so he lives with his grandmother. Zoli, his mother's estranged boyfriend, starts to harass Lucas, prompting him to skip school and take long bus rides in attempts to find his mother.
