= Deron Mayo =

American gridiron football player and coach (born 1988)

New England Patriots
- Title: Head strength and conditioning coach

Personal information
- Born: March 28, 1988 (age 38); Hampton, Virginia, U.S
- Listed height: 5 ft 11 in (1.80 m)
- Listed weight: 225 lb (102 kg)

Career information
- Position: Linebacker
- High school: Kecoughtan (Hampton)
- College: Hofstra (2007-2009); Old Dominion (2010)
- NFL draft: 2011: undrafted

Career history

Playing
- Denver Broncos (2011)*; Calgary Stampeders (2012–2017)
- * Offseason or practice squad member only

Coaching
- New England Patriots (2018–2023) Assistant strength and conditioning coach; New England Patriots (2024–present) Head strength and conditioning coach

Awards and highlights
- Grey Cup champion (2014)

Career CFL statistics
- Tackles: 277
- Sacks: 14
- Interceptions: 1
- Fumble recoveries: 4
- Stats at CFL.ca
- Stats at Pro Football Reference

Deron Mayo (born March 28, 1988) is an American football coach and former linebacker and is the head strength and conditioning coach for the New England Patriots of the National Football League (NFL). He played college football for Hofstra and Old Dominion. He signed with the Denver Broncos as an undrafted free agent in 2011. Mayo also played for the Calgary Stampeders of the Canadian Football League (CFL).

== Early life ==
Mayo attended Kecoughtan High School in Hampton, Virginia where he played football. He was selected to the All-Peninsula District first-team and all-area second-team both in his senior seasons.

== Playing career ==
=== College ===
He played college football at Hofstra University in his first three seasons before transferring to Old Dominion for his senior season.

=== National Football League ===
==== Denver Broncos ====
On July 26, 2011, he signed with the Denver Broncos as an undrafted free agent.

=== Canadian Football League ===
==== Calgary Stampeders ====
On May 8, 2012, Mayo signed with the Calgary Stampeders of the Canadian Football League. In his first season in the CFL, Mayo was a big contributor on special teams, amassing 15 special teams tackles: He also had 9 defensive tackles and 1 quarterback sack. In his second season Mayo became a major part of the Stamps' defensive unit. He finished the season with 57 tackles (9 special teams tackles), 5 sacks, 1 interception and 2 fumble recoveries. Following the season, on February 13, 2014, he re-signed with the Stampeders. In the 2014 CFL season Mayo continued his strong play, setting a new career high in tackles with 67; while also contributing 2 sacks, 2 fumble recoveries and 1 special teams tackle. To conclude the 2014 season, the Stampeders won the 102nd Grey Cup by defeating Hamilton 20-16. In the championship game, Mayo led the team with 7 tackles and a forced fumble. On March 9, 2015, the Stampeders and Mayo agreed to a contract extension. His retirement was made public by 3DownNation on April 10, 2018

== Coaching career ==
=== New England Patriots ===
In 2018, Mayo was hired by the New England Patriots as the assistant strength and conditioning coach. In 2024, he was promoted to head strength and conditioning coach. Despite his brother Jerod Mayo being fired as the Patriots head coach after the 2024 season, the then-recently hired Patriots head coach Mike Vrabel announced on February 5, 2025, that Deron Mayo would return for the 2025 season as the Patriots head strength and conditioning coach.

== Personal life ==
Mayo has two brothers, Jerod and Derek, who both played football as linebackers. Jerod played college football at Tennessee and was a first round pick for the New England Patriots of the NFL. He played with the team from 2008 to 2015, winning a Super Bowl. Jerod was the head coach for the Patriots during the 2024 season. Derek played college football at the University of Richmond, where he was a member of the 2008 Richmond Spiders NCAA FCS National Championship team.
