= Ja'Lynn Polk =

American football player (born 2002)

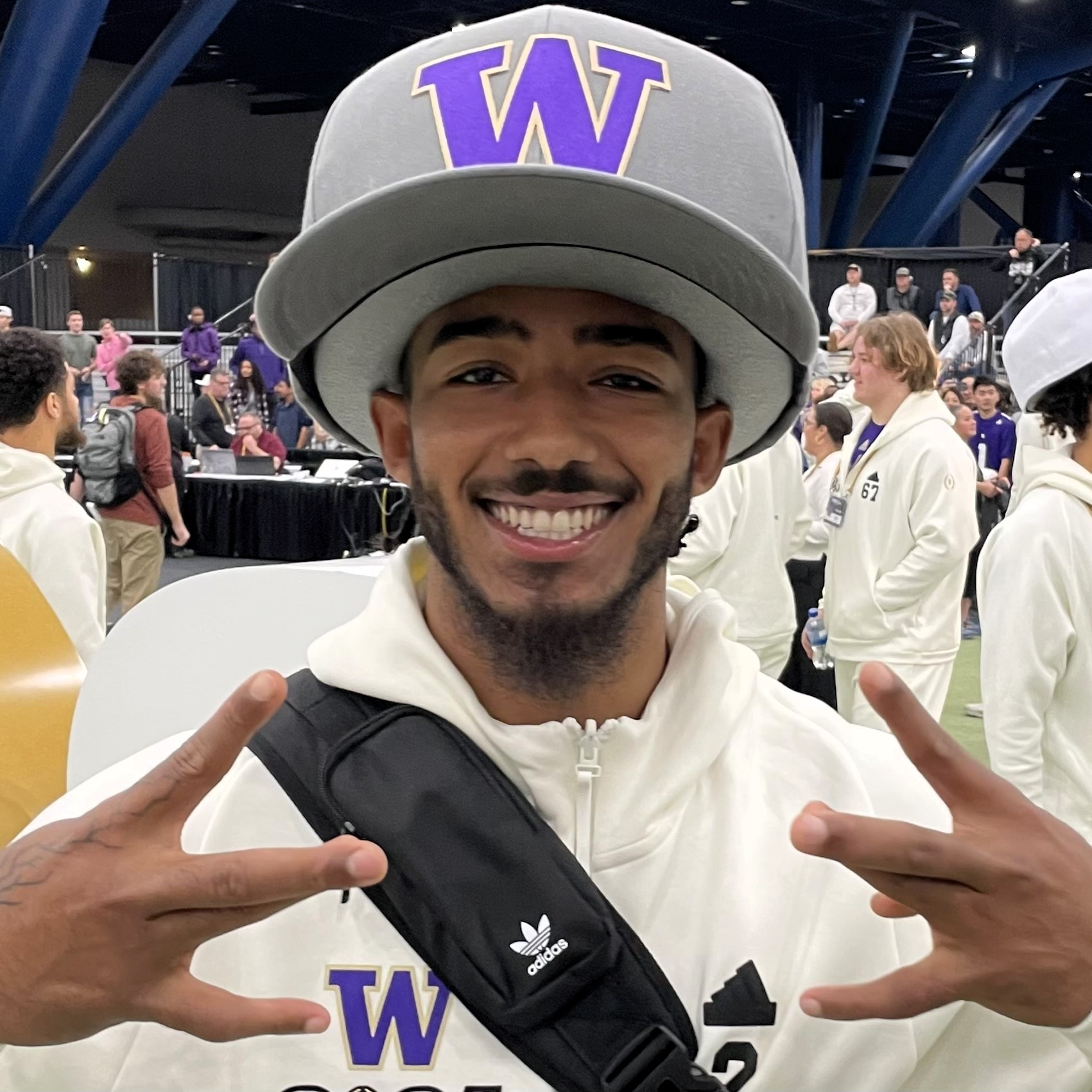
- Polk in 2024

No. 1, 13, 89
- Position: Wide receiver

Personal information
- Born: April 11, 2002 (age 24); Lufkin, Texas, U.S.
- Listed height: 6 ft 1 in (1.85 m)
- Listed weight: 203 lb (92 kg)

Career information
- High school: Lufkin
- College: Texas Tech (2020); Washington (2021–2023)
- NFL draft: 2024: 2nd round, 37th overall pick

Career history
- New England Patriots (2024); New Orleans Saints (2025)

Career NFL statistics
- Receptions: 12
- Receiving yards: 87
- Receiving touchdowns: 2
- Stats at Pro Football Reference

Ja'Lynn Polk (born April 11, 2002) is an American former professional football player who was a wide receiver in the National Football League (NFL). He played college football at Texas Tech and Washington before being selected 37th overall in the 2024 NFL draft by the New England Patriots. Polk was also a member of the New Orleans Saints.

== Early life ==
Polk attended Lufkin High School in Lufkin, Texas. During his career, he had 131 receptions for 2,412 yards and 24 touchdowns. He committed to Texas Tech University to play college football.

== College career ==
Polk played at Texas Tech for one season in 2020, starting seven of 10 games, recording 28 receptions for 264 yards and two touchdowns. In 2021, he transferred to the University of Washington. He played in only three games with two starts his first year at Washington due to injury and finished with five receptions for 114 yards and a touchdown. Polk spent 2022 as the team's third receiver behind Rome Odunze and Jalen McMillan. He finished the year with 41 receptions for 694 yards and six touchdowns. He returned to Washington in 2023. In the 2023 season, he had seven games with over 100 receiving yards. In the College Football Playoffs Semifinal against Texas, he had five receptions for 122 yards in the 37–31 win. He finished with 69 receptions for 1,159 yards and nine touchdowns. After the 2024 CFP National Championship, Polk declared for the NFL Draft.

== Professional career ==
Pre-draft measurables
Height	Weight	Arm length	Hand span	Wingspan	40-yard dash	10-yard split	20-yard split	Vertical jump	Broad jump
6 ft 1 3/8 in (1.86 m)	203 lb (92 kg)	31 3/4 in (0.81 m)	9 3/4 in (0.25 m)	6 ft 2 1/2 in (1.89 m)	4.52 s	1.52 s	2.65 s	37.5 in (0.95 m)	10 ft 9 in (3.28 m)
All values from NFL Combine

=== New England Patriots ===
Polk was selected by the New England Patriots with the 37th overall pick in second round of the 2024 NFL draft. On June 13, 2024, Polk signed his four-year rookie contract worth $9.7 million, with a $3.87 million signing bonus.

In the first quarter of Week 2 against the Seattle Seahawks, Polk scored his first NFL touchdown on a five-yard pass from Jacoby Brissett in the 20–23 overtime loss. As a rookie, Polk appeared in 15 games and started seven. He finished with 12 receptions for 87 yards and two touchdowns. Multiple statistical measurements and football analysts rated Polk as one of the worst wide receivers in the NFL for his performance in 2024.

On August 21, 2025, it was announced that Polk would require season-ending shoulder surgery.

=== New Orleans Saints ===
On September 13, 2025, the Patriots traded Polk and a 2028 seventh-round pick to the New Orleans Saints in exchange for a 2027 sixth-round pick.

On August 2, 2026, it was announced that Polk had retired from the NFL at age 24. The Saints placed him on their reserve/retired list shortly after.

== NFL career statistics ==
=== Regular season ===
Year	Team	Games		Receiving					Rushing					Fumbles	
Year	Team	GP	GS	Rec	Yds	Y/R	Lng	TD	Att	Yds	Y/A	Lng	TD	Fum	Lost
2024	NE	14	7	12	87	7.3	21	2	1	0	0	0.0	0	0	0
Career		14	7	12	87	7.3	21	2	1	0	0	0.0	0	0	0
