= Evan Rothstein =

American football coach

Denver Broncos
- Title: Director of game management/assistant quarterbacks coach

Career information
- High school: Bellmore (NY) John F. Kennedy High School
- College: SUNY Cortland

Career history
- Cortland (2006–2009) Student assistant; Syracuse (2010–2011) Offensive quality control coach; Detroit Lions (2012–2020); Special teams quality control coach (2012–2013); Special projects coach (2014); Offensive assistant (2015–2017); Head coach assistant/research & analyst (2018–2020); New England Patriots (2021–2024); Research and analysis/coaching (2021); Offensive assistant (2022); Assistant quarterbacks coach (2023); Assistant quarterbacks coach/director of game management (2024); Denver Broncos (2025–present); Director of game management/offensive line assistant (2025); Director of game management/assistant quarterbacks coach (2026–present)

Evan Rothstein is an American professional football coach who is the director of game management and assistant quarterbacks coach for the Denver Broncos of the National Football League (NFL).

== Early life and education ==
Evan Rothstein is a native of Merrick, New York and attended Bellmore John F. Kennedy High School. He graduated from SUNY Cortland in 2009 with a bachelor in sports management; he followed with a 2012 master's degree in sports management.

== Coaching career ==
=== SUNY Cortland ===
From 2006 to 2009 he was a student assistant football coach at Cortland. His duties included video operations, assisting with the offensive line and quality control. In the 2010 spring season, he worked briefly with the Cortland offensive line, before moving on to Syracuse.

=== Syracuse University ===
Rothstein interned with Syracuse's video operations department during the fall of 2009. Rothstein spent two seasons at Syracuse, 2010–2011, as an offensive quality control coach.

=== Detroit Lions ===
He joined the Lions in 2012 as a quality control/special team coach and had responsibility for breaking down film of opponents. Rothstein was offensive assistant coach from 2015–2017. In 2018, under coach Matt Patricia, he became "head coach assistant/research & analyst," mainly focusing on defense. In December 2020, because of quarantine restrictions, he became the defensive play caller for a game against Tom Brady.

=== New England Patriots ===
Rothstein moved to the Patriots in 2021, with Matt Patricia. He started as a member of the research and analysis department. He moved up to offensive assistant in 2022 and in 2023 became assistant quarterback coach. In the 2024 move to a new head coach, Rothstein was retained and given a new role, assisting head coach Jerod Mayo in situational matters; there was no official name designated for this position. His role appears to have been similar to that of former Patriot research director, Ernie Adams.

=== Denver Broncos ===
On March 6, 2025, Rothstein was hired by the Denver Broncos as their director of game management and offensive line assistant. Ahead of the 2026 season, Rothstein was named the assistant quarterbacks coach in addition to his duties as director of game management.

== Personal ==
Rothstein is married and has three children. Rothstein is Jewish.
