= Eliot Wolf =

American football executive (born 1982)

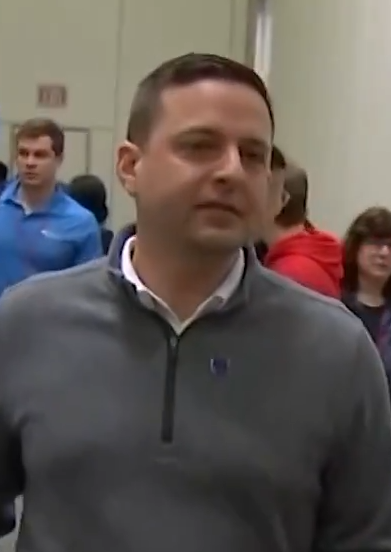
- Wolf in 2024

New England Patriots
- Title: Executive vice president of player personnel (Note: Also serves as de facto general manager for the Patriots.)

Personal information
- Born: March 21, 1982 (age 44); Oakland, California, U.S.

Career information
- High school: Notre Dame Academy (Green Bay, Wisconsin)
- College: University of Miami

Career history
- Green Bay Packers (2004–2017); Pro personnel assistant (2004–2008); Assistant director of pro personnel (2008–2011); Assistant director of player personnel (2011–2012); Director of pro personnel (2012–2015); Director of player personnel (2015–2016); Director of football operations (2016–2017); Cleveland Browns (2018–2019) Assistant general manager; New England Patriots (2020–present); Consultant (2020–2021); Director of scouting (2022–2023); Executive Vice President of Player Personnel (2024–present)

Awards and highlights
- Super Bowl champion (XLV)
- Executive profile at Pro Football Reference

Eliot R. Wolf (born March 21, 1982) is an American professional football executive who is the executive vice president of player personnel for the New England Patriots of the National Football League (NFL). He previously served in the Green Bay Packers' scouting department for 14 years before working as an assistant general manager with the Cleveland Browns in the late 2010s. Since the 2024 season, he has also served as New England's de facto general manager.

== Early life ==
Wolf was born on March 21, 1982, in Oakland, California, to a Jewish family. He graduated from Notre Dame Academy in Green Bay, Wisconsin, in 2000 and from the University of Miami in 2003. Wolf's father, Ron Wolf, was general manager of the Packers from 1991 to 2000.

== Executive career ==
Wolf joined the Packers as a pro personnel assistant in 2004. He became assistant director of pro personnel in 2008 and assistant director of player personnel in 2011 before advancing to director of pro personnel in 2012. On January 2, 2015, he was promoted to director of player personnel. A year later, on March 21, 2016, Wolf was promoted to director of football operations. In 2018, Wolf was one of four candidates interviewed to become the Packers' new general manager, but after Brian Gutekunst was hired for the job, Wolf left the Packers to be assistant general manager under John Dorsey with the Cleveland Browns.

Wolf and Dorsey spent two seasons with the Browns before parting ways following the 2019 season, and Wolf joined the New England Patriots as a scouting consultant the following year. He was promoted to director of scouting with the Patriots in 2022 and became the executive vice president of player personnel following the departure of longtime head coach and de facto general manager Bill Belichick in 2024.
