= Liam Fornadel =

American football player (born 1999)

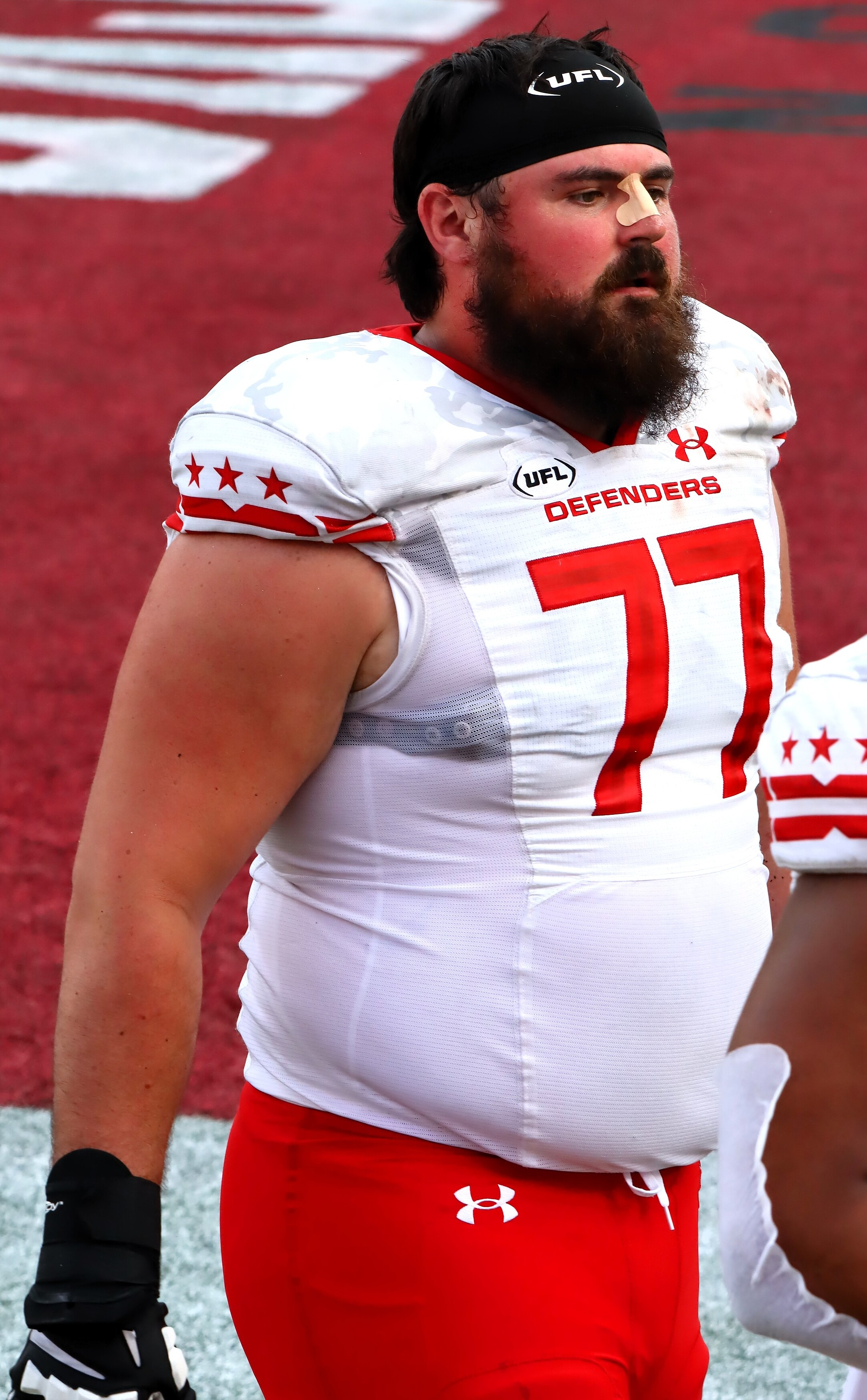
- Fornadel with the DC Defenders in 2025

Profile
- Position: Offensive guard

Personal information
- Born: June 17, 1999 (age 27)
- Listed height: 6 ft 4 in (1.93 m)
- Listed weight: 312 lb (142 kg)

Career information
- High school: Don Bosco Prep (Ramsey, New Jersey)
- College: James Madison (2017–2021)
- NFL draft: 2022: undrafted

Career history
- Winnipeg Blue Bombers (2022)*; DC Defenders (2023–2024); New England Patriots (2024)*; DC Defenders (2025); New York Jets (2025)*
- * Offseason or practice squad member only

Awards and highlights
- UFL champion (2025); All-XFL Team (2023)
- Stats at Pro Football Reference

Liam Paul Fornadel (born June 17, 1999) is an American professional football offensive guard. He played college football at James Madison. Fornadel has also played for the Winnipeg Blue Bombers of the Canadian Football League (CFL) and the DC Defenders of the United Football League (UFL) where in the latter he was part of the team's UFL championship win.

== College career ==
Fornadel played college football at James Madison from 2017 to 2021, where he played in 54 games, starting in 41.

== Professional career ==
Pre-draft measurables
Height	Weight	Arm length	Hand span	Wingspan	40-yard dash	10-yard split	20-yard split	20-yard shuttle	Three-cone drill	Vertical jump	Broad jump	Bench press
6 ft 4 1/4 in (1.94 m)	312 lb (142 kg)	32 1/4 in (0.82 m)	9 3/8 in (0.24 m)	6 ft 6 3/4 in (2.00 m)	5.51 s	1.84 s	3.17 s	4.72 s	7.67 s	24.0 in (0.61 m)	8 ft 0 in (2.44 m)	27 reps
All values from Pro Day

=== Winnipeg Blue Bombers ===
After going undrafted in the 2022 NFL draft, Fornadel was signed to the Winnipeg Blue Bombers of the Canadian Football League (CFL) practice squad on September 20, 2022. He was released on October 17, 2022.

=== DC Defenders (first stint) ===
On November 17, 2022, Fornadel was selected by the DC Defenders of the XFL. In 2023, Fornadel started in all 12 games, making the All-XFL team. In 2024, Fornadel started in all 10 games. His contract with the team was terminated on June 17, 2024, to sign with an NFL team.

=== New England Patriots ===
On June 18, 2024, Fornadel signed with the New England Patriots. He was waived on August 27, and re-signed to the practice squad. Fornadel was released on December 17.

=== DC Defenders (second stint) ===
On April 2, 2025, Fornadel signed with the DC Defenders.

=== New York Jets ===
On July 29, 2025, Fornadel signed with the New York Jets. He was waived on August 24, and re-signed to the practice squad on September 8. Fornadel was released on September 23 and re-signed to the practice squad one week later. He signed a reserve/future contract with New York on January 5, 2026.

On August 30, 2026, Fornadel was waived by the Jets as a part of final roster cuts.
