= JaQuae Jackson =

American football player (born 2000)

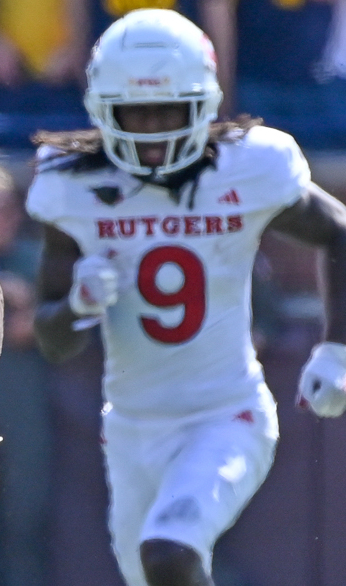
- Jackson with Rutgers in 2023

Profile
- Position: Wide receiver

Personal information
- Born: January 30, 2000 (age 26); Pittsburgh, Pennsylvania, U.S.
- Listed height: 6 ft 1 in (1.85 m)
- Listed weight: 184 lb (83 kg)

Career information
- High school: Serra Catholic (McKeesport, Pennsylvania)
- College: California (PA) (2018–2022); Rutgers (2023)
- NFL draft: 2024: undrafted

Career history
- Atlanta Falcons (2024)*; New England Patriots (2024); Los Angeles Chargers (2025–2026)*
- * Offseason or practice squad member only

Awards and highlights
- First-team All-PSAC West (2022)
- Stats at Pro Football Reference

JaQuae Jackson (born January 30, 2000) is an American professional football wide receiver. He played college football for the California Vulcans and Rutgers Scarlet Knights.

== Early life ==
Jackson attended high school at Serra Catholic. Coming out of high school he committed to play college football for the California Vulcans.

== College career ==
=== California (PA) ===
In Jackson's first season in 2018, he did not appear in any games. During his next season in 2019 he tallied 13 receptions for 198 yards and two touchdowns. In the 2020 season, Jackson would again not appear in any games due to his team's season being canceled due to the COVID-19 pandemic. During the 2021 season, Jackson totaled 58 receptions for 744 yards and eight touchdowns. Jackson had a breakout season in 2022 leading his team with 77 receptions for 1,178 yards and 13 touchdowns. For his performance in the 2022 season, Jackson was named a Division II All-American. After the conclusion of the 2022 season, Jackson decided to enter his name into the NCAA transfer portal.

=== Rutgers ===
Jackson decided to transfer to play for the Rutgers Scarlet Knights. In week two of the 2023 season, Jackson hauled in four receptions for 95 yards in a win over Temple. Jackson finished his lone season with Rutgers in 2023, hauling in 22 receptions for 361 yards and one touchdown in 12 starts. After the conclusion of the 2023 season, Jackson declared for the 2024 NFL draft.

== Professional career ==
Pre-draft measurables
Height	Weight	Arm length	Hand span	Wingspan	40-yard dash	10-yard split	20-yard split	20-yard shuttle	Three-cone drill	Vertical jump	Broad jump	Bench press
6 ft 1 in (1.85 m)	183 lb (83 kg)	31 7/8 in (0.81 m)	9 1/8 in (0.23 m)	6 ft 4 3/8 in (1.94 m)	4.52 s	1.56 s	2.61 s	4.18 s	6.85 s	36 in (0.91 m)	10 ft 0 in (3.05 m)	12 reps
All values from Pro Day

=== Atlanta Falcons ===
After not being selected in the 2024 NFL draft, Jackson decided to sign with the Atlanta Falcons as an undrafted free agent. On June 4, 2024, Jackson was waived by the Falcons.

=== New England Patriots ===
On June 6, 2024, Jackson was claimed off waivers by the New England Patriots. On August 8, Jackson caught a 38-yard touchdown pass from Joe Milton during the Patriots' preseason game against the Carolina Panthers. On August 20, Jackson was placed on injured reserve due to suffering an injury in a preseason game against the Philadelphia Eagles.

On April 28, 2025, Jackson was released by the Patriots.

=== Los Angeles Chargers ===
On July 25, 2025, Jackson signed with the Los Angeles Chargers. He was released on August 26 and re-signed to the practice squad the next day. On January 13, 2026, Jackson signed a reserve/futures contract with Los Angeles.

On August 30, 2026, Jackson was waived by the Chargers as a part of final roster cuts.
