= Serra Catholic High School =

Location
- 200 Hershey Drive; McKeesport, (Allegheny County), Pennsylvania 15132; United States; 40°19′32″N 79°49′27″W

Information
- Type: Private, Coeducational
- Motto: Amor a Dios (Love of God)
- Religious affiliations: Roman Catholic; Franciscan
- Established: 1961
- CEEB code: 392495
- Principal: Robert E. Childs
- Grades: 9–12
- Colors: Maroon and Gold
- Mascot: Eagle
- Team name: Eagles
- Accreditation: Middle States Association of Colleges and Schools
- Admissions Director: Lori Lyons
- Athletic Director: Cara DeSalvo
- Website: www.serrahs.org

Serra Catholic High School is a private, college preparatory, Roman Catholic high school in McKeesport, Pennsylvania. It is located in the Roman Catholic Diocese of Pittsburgh.

== History ==
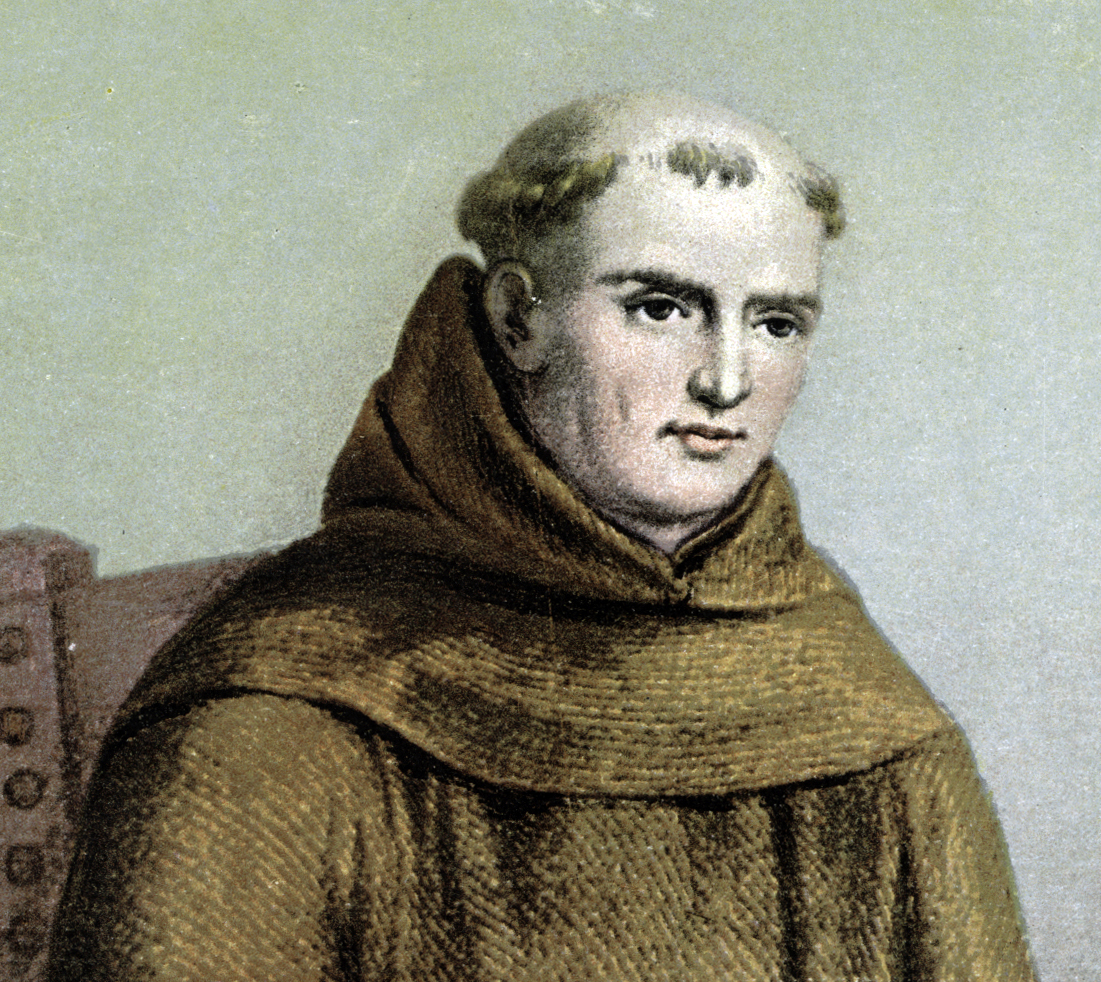
The school is named for Californian missionary Saint Junípero Serra.

Serra Catholic was established in September 1961 as an all-boys school by the Order of Friars Minor of the Province of the Immaculate Conception in New York City. The Order of Friars Minor of the Province of the Immaculate Conception led the school from 1961 until 1995, when the Franciscans Third Order Regular assumed the leadership role. The Third Order of Saint Francis led the school until 2004.

The school moved into its current building in 1963 and is named after St. Junípero Serra. The school was originally all-boys but became coeducational in 1972, when Serra Catholic High School merged with Mon Yough Catholic High School.

== Academics ==
Serra Catholic offers a college preparatory curriculum for all students. All courses are assigned a level, which determines how the grade is included in the student’s GPA, QPA, or both. The levels include Level 1 (academic course with support), Level 3 (academic course), Level 5 (honors level course), Level 7 (college credit course), and Level 8 (non-academic course).

The students at Serra Catholic participate in a variety of testing programs throughout their high school career. Incoming ninth grade students take the STS High School Placement Test, which helps determine the best courses to fit their academic needs. Students in both ninth and tenth grades take the Iowa Tests of Basic Skills during the school year. Students in tenth and eleventh grades prepare for the SAT exams by taking the Practice Scholastic Aptitude Test.

Serra Catholic is accredited through the Middle States Association of Colleges and Schools. In addition, in September 2012, the school became a recipient of the Catholic High School Honor Roll, by the Cardinal Newman Society.

=== College in High School (CHS) Program ===
Serra Catholic offers a wide variety of college-level courses for students through four local colleges and universities. A total of 70 College In High School Credits are available. Some students enter college with advanced standing as sophomores, based upon the college courses successfully completed at Serra.

== Activities ==
Activities and clubs are offered for Serra Catholic students. Most activities and clubs meet one time per month during the school day, but some programs conduct meetings and participate in activities outside of school.

In addition to activities and clubs, Serra Catholic also hosts annual events. These include a Walk-a-Thon to support local organizations, formal and informal dances, the March for Life in Washington, D.C., a talent show, a spring musical, and a summer trip to assist the needy in the Appalachian Mountains.

== Athletics ==
Serra Catholic offers a variety of sports, most of which compete in the Class AA WPIAL bracket.

=== Fall Sports ===
- Soccer
- Football
- Volleyball
- Golf
- Cheerleading
- Cross Country

=== Winter Sports ===
- Hockey
- Bowling
- Basketball

=== Spring Sports ===
- Baseball
- Softball
- Track & Field

Serra Catholic’s sports teams have won many championships over the years, including PIAA State Championships, WPIAL Championships, and Section Championships.

== Alma mater ==
The youth of Serra proudly fly
From out this hallowed eagles’ nest.
Their colors wave forever high,
For God and country ever blest.
Amor a Dios ever be,
The star that guides their destiny,
All hail to Alma Mater, aye!
May she stand with all that's best.

== Notable alumni ==
- JaQuae Jackson, NFL wide receiver for the LA Chargers
