= Jerod Mayo =

American football player and coach (born 1986)

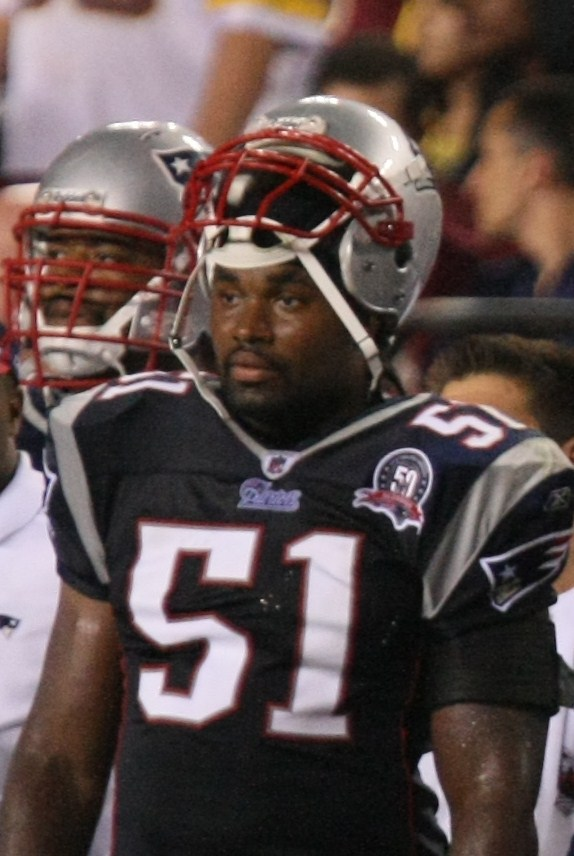
- Mayo with the New England Patriots in 2009

No. 51
- Position: Linebacker

Personal information
- Born: February 23, 1986 (age 40); Hampton, Virginia, U.S.
- Listed height: 6 ft 1 in (1.85 m)
- Listed weight: 250 lb (113 kg)

Career information
- High school: Kecoughtan (Hampton)
- College: Tennessee (2004–2007)
- NFL draft: 2008: 1st round, 10th overall pick

Career history

Playing
- New England Patriots (2008–2015)

Coaching
- New England Patriots (2019–2023) Inside linebackers coach; New England Patriots (2024) Head coach

Awards and highlights
- As a player: Super Bowl champion (XLIX); NFL Defensive Rookie of the Year (2008); First-team All-Pro (2010); 2× Pro Bowl (2010, 2012); NFL solo tackles leader (2010); NFL combined tackles leader (2010); PFWA All-Rookie Team (2008); New England Patriots All-2010s Team; First-team All-SEC (2007)

Career NFL statistics
- Tackles: 802
- Sacks: 11
- Forced fumbles: 8
- Fumble recoveries: 7
- Pass deflections: 19
- Interceptions: 3
- Stats at Pro Football Reference

Head coaching record
- Regular season: 4–13 (.235)
- Coaching profile at Pro Football Reference

Jerod Andrew Mayo Sr. (born February 23, 1986) is an American former professional football coach and former linebacker who played in the National Football League (NFL) for eight seasons with the New England Patriots. He also served as the head coach of the Patriots in 2024. Mayo played college football for the Tennessee Volunteers, receiving first-team All-SEC honors in 2007. He was selected by the Patriots 10th overall in the 2008 NFL draft.

During his playing career, Mayo was named Defensive Rookie of the Year, earned first-team All-Pro honors in 2010 after leading the league in tackles, and received two Pro Bowl selections. He rejoined the Patriots to be the inside linebackers coach, a position he held from 2019 to 2023. In 2024, he was named head coach, but was fired after one season.

== Early life ==
Mayo was born in Hampton, Virginia. He attended Kecoughtan High School in Hampton, where he earned three letters in football as a linebacker and a running back. As a senior, he recorded 110 tackles, including 18 for loss and two interceptions. Also playing running back for seven games, he picked up 1,245 rushing yards and scored 13 touchdowns and five two-point conversions during his final campaign. As a junior, he recorded 68 tackles including 22 for loss, four interceptions and three sacks and earned first-team All-District, All-Area and All-Region honors. Considered a four-star recruit by Rivals.com, Mayo ranked eleventh among outside linebackers nationwide. He chose University of Tennessee over North Carolina State, Purdue, Virginia, and Virginia Tech.

Jerod's younger brother, Deron Mayo, was a linebacker for the Calgary Stampeders of the Canadian Football League.

== College career ==
While attending Tennessee, Mayo played for the Tennessee Volunteers football team from 2004 to 2007. After redshirting the 2004 season, he appeared in six games at weak-side outside linebacker in 2005, finishing with 13 tackles (10 solo). Mayo made the Volunteers starting lineup as a redshirt sophomore in 2006, as he started 11 contests at weak-side outside linebacker. He finished third on the team with 83 tackles (48 solos), including five sacks for minus 40 yards, 12.5 stops for losses of 51 yards and a quarterback pressure. He also recovered one fumble and deflected a pass. Rivals.com subsequently named him to their All-American second-team.

For his junior season, Mayo moved to middle linebacker and started all 14 games. Serving as the defensive squad's co-captain, he registered 140 tackles in 2007, the most by a Tennessee defender since Earnest Fields registered those same totals for the Volunteers in 1990. He added 1.5 quarterback sacks for minus 11 yards, 8.5 stops for losses and five quarterback pressures, and also returned an interception 34 yards for a touchdown. Mayo was a first-team All-Southeastern Conference selection and also earned All-American second-team honors by The NFL Draft Report.

He graduated from Tennessee with a degree in political science.

== Professional career ==
=== Pre-draft ===
Mayo was considered one of the best linebackers available in the 2008 NFL draft and drew comparisons to Will Witherspoon. Sporting News described Mayo as a “perfect fit to play one of the inside spots” in a 3–4 defense.

Pre-draft measurables
Height	Weight	Arm length	Hand span	40-yard dash	10-yard split	20-yard split	20-yard shuttle	Three-cone drill	Vertical jump	Broad jump	Bench press
6 ft 1 1/4 in (1.86 m)	242 lb (110 kg)	32 7/8 in (0.84 m)	9 1/4 in (0.23 m)	4.54 s	1.51 s	2.58 s	4.29 s	7.31 s	40.5 in (1.03 m)	9 ft 6 in (2.90 m)	22 reps
Vertical and Bench from Tennessee Pro Day; all others from NFL Scouting Combine

=== 2008 season ===
The New England Patriots selected Mayo in the first round (10th overall) of the 2008 NFL draft. Mayo was the second linebacker drafted in 2008, behind Keith Rivers. On July 24, 2008, the Patriots signed Mayo to a five-year contract (rather than the six-year maximum allowed by the NFL's collective bargaining agreement) worth $18.9 million, including $13.8 million in bonuses and guarantees. Mayo was the only rookie in the Patriots' 2008 class to start in Week 1, and played every snap for the defense.

Mayo was named the NFL's Defensive Rookie of the Month for October 2008. He led the Patriots with 24 tackles for the month, including 11 against the Denver Broncos in his first Monday Night Football appearance. In the Patriots' Thursday Night Football game on November 13, 2008, against their division rivals, the New York Jets, Mayo led all defensive players with 20 tackles (16 solo, 4 assisted), the first 20-tackle game of his career.

At the end of the 2008 season, in which Mayo had 128 total tackles (100 solo, 28 assists) and a forced fumble, he was named AP Defensive Rookie of the Year for 2008 in a near-unanimous vote: Mayo received 49 of 50 votes cast, with Cincinnati Bengals linebacker Keith Rivers receiving the other vote.

=== 2009 season ===
Mayo was injured in the Patriots' 2009 season opener against the Buffalo Bills. The sprained MCL in his knee was originally expected to keep him out 6–8 weeks, but he returned in Week 5 against the Denver Broncos. Mayo finished the 2009 season with 103 tackles and 1.5 sacks.

=== 2010 season ===
In 2010, Mayo was named a defensive captain. In Week 4 against the Miami Dolphins, Mayo recorded 16 tackles, and two weeks later notched 18 tackles in an overtime win over the Baltimore Ravens. In Week 8, Mayo recorded 14 tackles in a win over the Minnesota Vikings. Against the Indianapolis Colts in Week 11, Mayo recorded 15 tackles in a win. In Week 12, Mayo's eight tackles gave him 132 on the season, surpassing his previous career high of 128, set in 2008. He added another 12 tackles in Week 13 against the New York Jets, and had 16 in Week 15 against the Green Bay Packers. He ended the season with a league-high 175 tackles, along with two sacks and one forced fumble.

He was named as a reserve to the 2011 Pro Bowl on January 2, 2011. In the same season he was named to the 2010 All Pro team. On December 17, 2011, at the beginning of Week 15, it was announced that he had signed a 5-year contract extension with the Patriots. He was ranked 62nd by his fellow players on the NFL Top 100 Players of 2011.

=== 2011 season ===
In 2011, Mayo missed three games due to injuries but still managed to eclipse the 100-tackle mark. Mayo and the Patriots reached Super Bowl XLVI. In the game, Mayo had 11 tackles but the Patriots lost to the New York Giants by a score of 21–17.

=== 2012 season ===
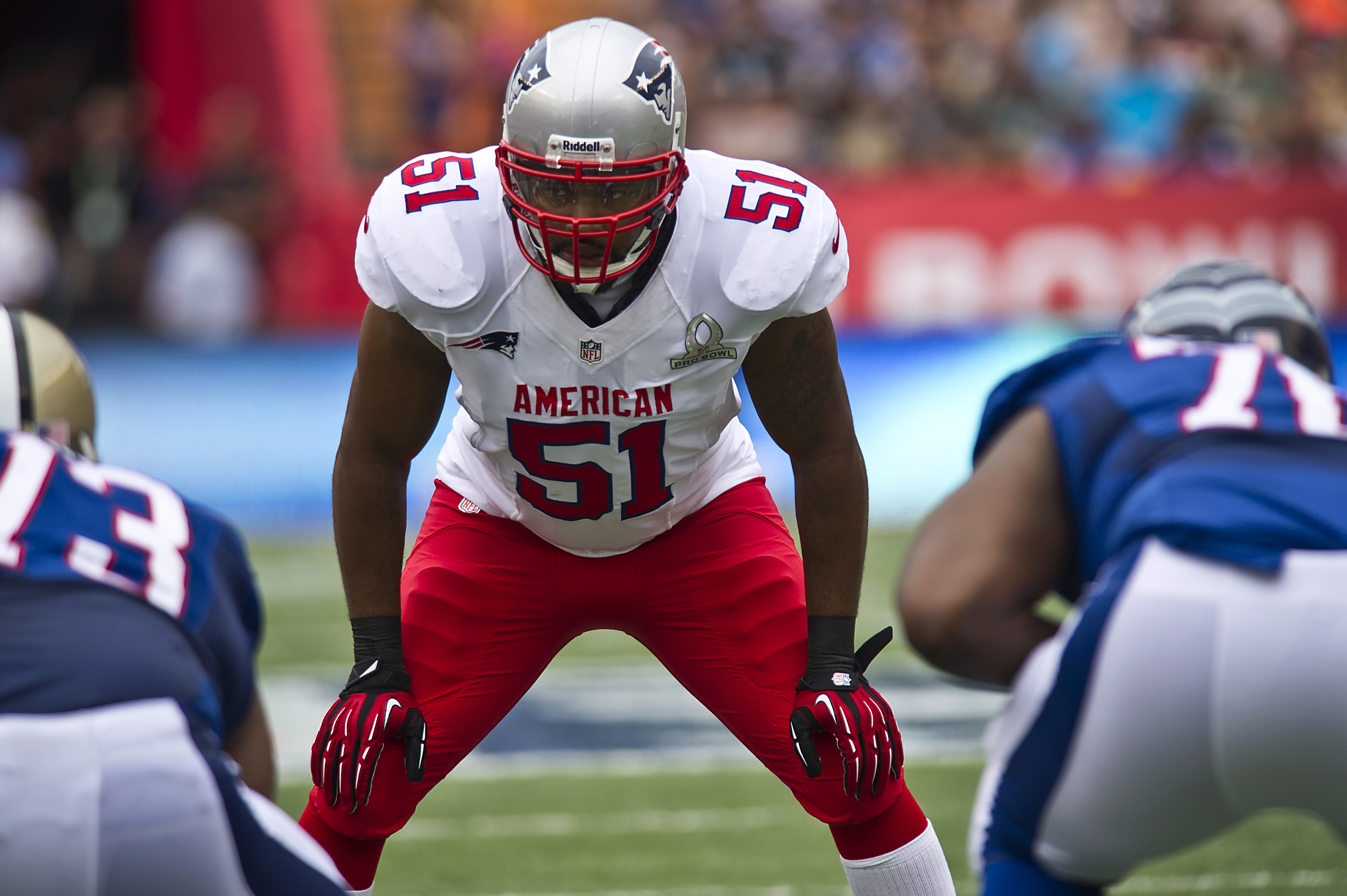
Mayo during the 2013 Pro Bowl

Mayo was voted a defensive co-captain by his teammates for the fourth straight year. On November 16, 2012, Mayo was fined $10,000 for a late hit out of bounds on Week 10 against C. J. Spiller with the Buffalo Bills. That drew an unnecessary roughness call.

Later in 2012, he was selected to the 2013 Pro Bowl in recognition of a standout 2012 season.

=== 2013 season ===
Mayo was placed on injured reserve on October 16 after tearing his pectoral muscle on October 13 in a Patriots comeback win against the New Orleans Saints.

=== 2014 season ===
On October 16, Mayo was placed on injured reserve with a torn patellar tendon that he suffered in a game against the Buffalo Bills in Week 6. Without Mayo, the Patriots won Super Bowl XLIX after they defeated the defending champion Seattle Seahawks by a score of 28–24.

=== 2015 season ===
Mayo's playing time dipped in the 2015 season, being behind Dont'a Hightower and Jamie Collins on the depth chart. On January 19, 2016, days before the AFC Championship against the Denver Broncos, Mayo was placed on injured reserve with a shoulder injury.

On February 16, 2016, Mayo posted a message on his Instagram account announcing his retirement, thanking the Patriots for the previous eight years.

== NFL career statistics ==
Legend
	Won the Super Bowl
	Led the league
**Bold**	Career high

=== Regular season ===
Year	Team	Games		Tackles				Fumbles			Interceptions					
Year	Team	GP	GS	Cmb	Solo	Ast	Sck	FF	FR	Yds	Int	Yds	Avg	Lng	TD	PD
2008	NE	**16**	**16**	128	100	28	0.0	1	1	0	0	0	0.0	0	0	4
2009	NE	13	12	103	70	33	1.5	1	0	0	0	0	0.0	0	0	1
2010	NE	**16**	**16**	**174**	**113**	**61**	2.0	1	**3**	−2	0	0	0.0	0	0	**5**
2011	NE	14	13	95	58	37	1.0	1	0	0	**2**	**4**	**2.0**	**2**	0	4
2012	NE	**16**	**16**	147	88	59	**3.0**	**4**	1	0	1	0	0.0	0	0	3
2013	NE	6	6	55	35	20	1.5	0	1	**2**	0	0	0.0	0	0	1
2014	NE	6	6	53	37	16	1.0	0	1	0	0	0	0.0	0	0	0
2015	NE	**16**	8	47	35	12	1.0	0	0	0	0	0	0.0	0	0	1
Career		103	93	802	536	266	11.0	8	7	0	3	4	1.0	2	0	19

=== Postseason ===
Year	Team	Games		Tackles				Fumbles			Interceptions					
Year	Team	GP	GS	Cmb	Solo	Ast	Sck	FF	FR	Yds	Int	Yds	Avg	Lng	TD	PD
2009	NE	1	1	8	4	4	0.0	0	0	0	—	—	—	—	—	0
2010	NE	1	1	6	3	3	0.0	0	0	0	—	—	—	—	—	**1**
2011	NE	3	3	**28**	**13**	**15**	0.0	**1**	0	0	—	—	—	—	—	0
2012	NE	2	2	15	10	5	0.0	**1**	0	0	—	—	—	—	—	0
2013	NE	0	0	Did not play due to injury												
2014	NE	0	0	Did not play due to injury												
2015	NE	1	0	0	0	0	0.0	0	0	0	—	—	—	—	—	0
Career		8	7	57	30	27	0.0	2	0	0	0	0	0.0	0	0	1

== Coaching career ==
On March 27, 2019, Patriots head coach Bill Belichick brought Mayo back as inside linebackers coach.

Mayo attracted considerable interest for head coaching jobs. By 2023, Robert Kraft was concerned about the large number of assistants leaving for other posts elsewhere, and believed Mayo could be a successful head coach despite his limited experience. Before the 2023 season, Kraft and Belichick agreed that Belichick would retire in 2025, and designated Mayo as his successor. The plan called for Belichick to groom Mayo for the job over the next two years. However, the plan came unraveled when the Patriots crumbled to 4-13 and Belichick's relationship with Kraft deteriorated. Kraft decided to have Mayo take over a year early.

On January 12, 2024, a day after Belichick and the Patriots mutually parted ways, the Patriots announced Mayo as the 15th head coach in franchise history and their first Black head coach. He is the second member of the Patriots' 2008 draft class to become an NFL head coach, after Kevin O'Connell became head coach of the Minnesota Vikings in 2022. Mayo also became the youngest head coach in the NFL until a few weeks later when the Seattle Seahawks hired Mike Macdonald. In his opening press conference, Mayo revealed his view on racism, saying: "I do see color," leading to an awkward moment on stage with owner Robert Kraft, who tried to downplay Mayo's skin color.

Mayo's Patriots struggled throughout the 2024 season, going on two separate six-game losing streaks and finishing the season with a 4–13 record. Although the team won the final game of the season, Mayo faced further criticism because the victory cost the Patriots the top pick in the 2025 NFL draft. In what would be his last press conference as head coach, Mayo defended the victory, saying that his goal was to always win.

On January 5, 2025, less than two hours after the Patriots' season finale ended, Kraft announced that Mayo would not return as the Patriots' head coach for the 2025 season, making him the second Patriots coach fired after one season. (The first was Rod Rust, who went 1–15 in 1990.) The move came after significant regression from 2023 under Belichick, especially on defense (where Mayo had played and coached), and multiple press conference gaffes where Mayo was forced to walk back comments.

According to a report from Chad Graff of The Athletic, citing sources within the team, Mayo had sought to differentiate himself and his style of coaching from Belichick but it backfired on him as he "struggled to apply and uphold discipline after positioning himself as a players' coach." One Patriots source said "[H]onestly, Jerod is a good guy. I just don't think he was ready for all the big decisions and discipline and focus the job takes." Graff also pointed to the fact that Mayo had only five seasons of coaching experience prior to his promotion to head coach, and had never worked as a full-time coordinator. Additionally, Belichick largely cut Mayo out of his circle as the 2023 season unraveled. It didn't help that Mayo had few ties outside the Patriots, forcing him to rely on general manager Eliot Wolf to help him fill out his staff. His defensive coordinator, DeMarcus Covington, along with several other assistants, had never held their jobs before. Kraft took accountability for Mayo's struggles, saying that he put him in "an untenable situation."

== Head coaching record ==
Team	Year	Regular season					Postseason			
Team	Year	Won	Lost	Ties	Win %	Finish	Won	Lost	Win %	Result
NE	2024	4	13	0	.235	4th in AFC East	—	—	—	—
Total		4	13	0	.235		0	0	.000	

== Personal life ==
Mayo and his wife, Chantel, have four children. They live in North Attleboro, Massachusetts. Jerod is a Christian.

He has four brothers and two sisters. Two of his brothers were also linebackers: his younger brother, Deron, played in the Canadian Football League and is the head strength and conditioning coach for the New England Patriots, while Derek is a graduate of the University of Richmond in Richmond, Virginia, where he won the NCAA Football Championship Subdivision title in 2008. Mayo held a cameo role in the 2012 film The Three Stooges, alongside Troy Brown.

In February 2026, Mayo became the managing director of the Fifth Down Capital private equity firm.
