= 2020 New England Patriots season =

61st season in franchise history; first losing season since 2000

- Owner: Robert Kraft
- General manager: Bill Belichick
- Head coach: Bill Belichick
- Home stadium: Gillette Stadium

Results
- Record: 7–9
- Division place: 3rd AFC East
- Playoffs: Did not qualify
- All-Pros: PR Gunner Olszewski (1st team); P Jake Bailey (1st team); ST Matthew Slater (2nd team)
- Pro Bowlers: CB Stephon Gilmore; ST Matthew Slater; P Jake Bailey

Uniform
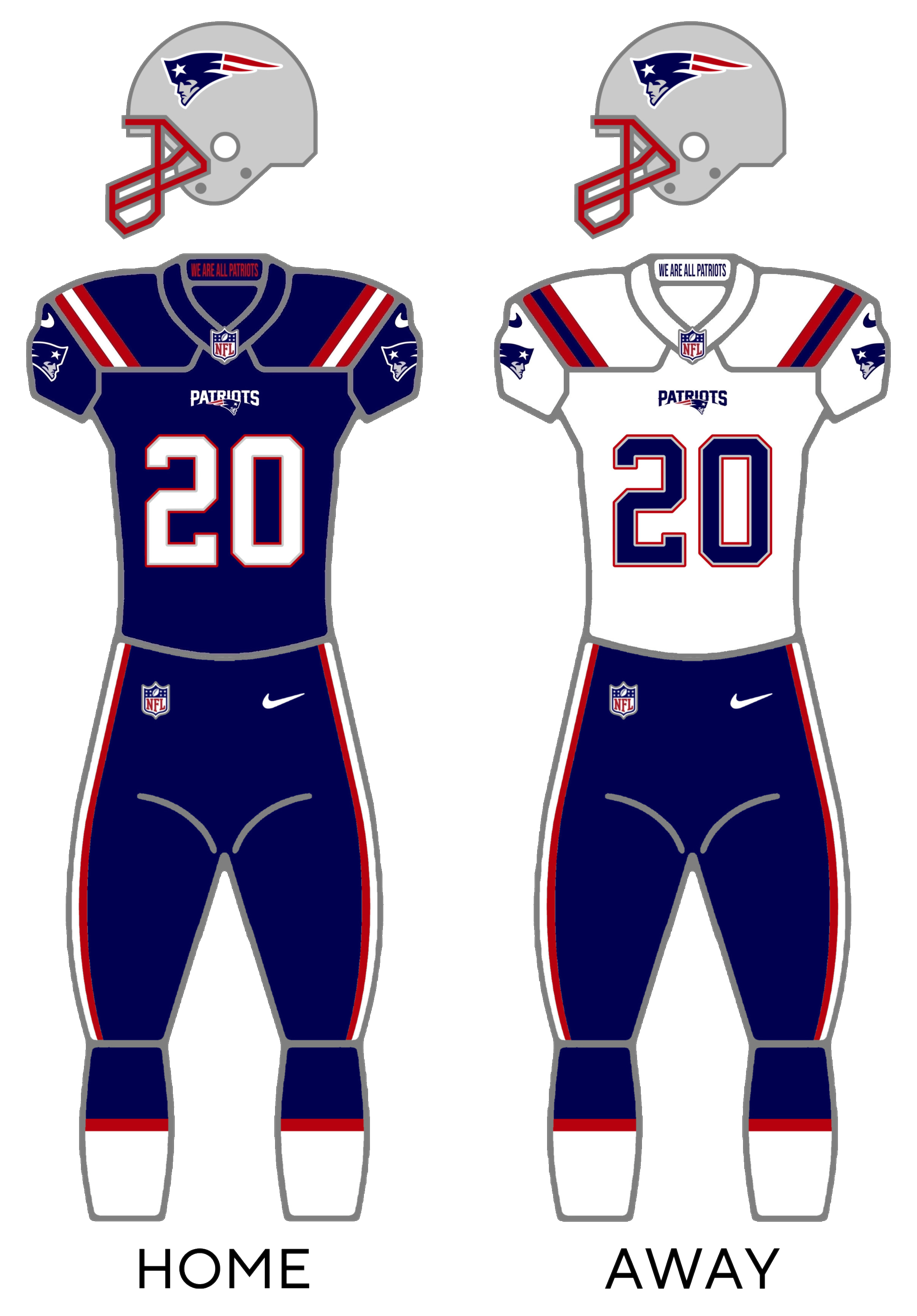

The 2020 season was the New England Patriots' 51st in the National Football League (NFL), their 61st overall, and their 21st under head coach Bill Belichick.

It was the first season since 1999 without quarterback Tom Brady on the roster, as he signed with the Tampa Bay Buccaneers. Brady led the Patriots to nine Super Bowl appearances, winning six, and had been their primary starting quarterback from 2001 to 2019, and would go on to win Super Bowl LV with his new team, his seventh overall. The Patriots signed long-time Carolina Panthers quarterback and 2015 MVP Cam Newton on June 29, and named him the starting quarterback on September 3.

The Patriots attempted to win their 12th consecutive AFC East title and their first since 1997 without Tom Brady. However, they saw many key players opt out of the season due to COVID-19 concerns and battled numerous injuries throughout the season. They began the season 2–5, their worst record through 7 games since 2000. They failed to improve on their 12–4 record from the previous season following a Week 7 loss to the San Francisco 49ers and failed to match that record following a Week 8 loss to the division rival Buffalo Bills. Following a Sunday Night win by the Bills over the Steelers in week 14, the Patriots failed to win their division for the first time since 2008, and they were mathematically eliminated from playoff contention for the first time since 2008 with a Week 15 loss to the Dolphins, ending their winning season streak at 19. This leaves the record to the Dallas Cowboys at 20 consecutive winning seasons from 1966 to 1985. After their blowout loss to the Buffalo Bills in week 16, the New England Patriots finished the 2020 season with a losing record for the first time since 2000.

This was only the third time after 2000 and the first time since 2008 in which the Patriots missed the playoffs and failed to win the division. With their 11-year streak of playoff appearances snapped, the Buffalo Bills now hold the league's longest playoff streak, making the playoffs every year since 2018. In addition, New England's streak of 10+ win seasons that dated back to their 2003 Super Bowl-winning season, which was an NFL record, also came to an end following a Week 14 loss to the Los Angeles Rams.

For the season, the Patriots adopted a modified version of their Color Rush jerseys as their primary home uniform while introducing a new road uniform for the first time since 2000.

This was also the final season of Super Bowl MVP Julian Edelman’s career. He played his final game in Week 7 against the San Francisco 49ers. He underwent precautionary surgery for a chronic knee injury and did not return for the remainder of the season. On April 12, 2021, he announced his retirement from the NFL.

== Roster changes ==
=== Free agency ===
==== Unrestricted ====
Position	Player	2020 team	Date signed	Contract
QB	Tom Brady	Tampa Bay Buccaneers	March 20, 2020	2 years, $50 million
DE	Shilique Calhoun	New England Patriots	March 24, 2020	1 year, $1.5 million
OLB	Jamie Collins	Detroit Lions	March 25, 2020	3 years, $30 million
WR	Phillip Dorsett	Seattle Seahawks	March 30, 2020	1 year, $1 million
FS	Nate Ebner	New York Giants	March 26, 2020	1 year, $2 million
C	James Ferentz	New England Patriots	September 16, 2020	1 year, $825,000
K	Nick Folk	New England Patriots	August 24, 2020	1 year, $1,05 million
C	Ted Karras	Miami Dolphins	March 20, 2020	1 year, $4 million
FS	Devin McCourty	New England Patriots	March 17, 2020	2 years, $23 million
OT	Marshall Newhouse	Tennessee Titans	November 27, 2020	1 year, $72,000
MLB	Elandon Roberts	Miami Dolphins	March 24, 2020	1 year, $2 million
DT	Danny Shelton	Detroit Lions	March 24, 2020	2 years, $8 million
WR	Matthew Slater	New England Patriots	March 13, 2020	2 years, $5.3 million
G	Joe Thuney	New England Patriots	March 20, 2020	Signed franchise tender worth 1 year, $14.8 million
OLB	Kyle Van Noy	Miami Dolphins	March 21, 2020	4 years, $51 million

==== Restricted ====
Position	Player	2020 team	Date signed	Contract
DT	Adam Butler	New England Patriots	April 17, 2020	Signed tender worth $3.3 million
G	Jermaine Eluemunor	New England Patriots	April 16, 2020	Signed tender worth $2.1 million

==== Exclusive-Rights ====
Position	Player	2020 team	Date signed	Contract
DE	Keionta Davis	New England Patriots	March 17, 2020	1 year, $675,000

==== Signings ====
Position	Player	Previous team	Date signed	Contract
DT	Beau Allen	Tampa Bay Buccaneers	March 20, 2020	2 years, $7 million
S	Adrian Phillips	Los Angeles Chargers	March 21, 2020	2 years, $6 million
FB	Danny Vitale	Green Bay Packers	March 21, 2020	1 year, $1.3 million
WR	Damiere Byrd	Arizona Cardinals	March 23, 2020	1 year, $1.4 million
FS	Cody Davis	Jacksonville Jaguars	March 23, 2020	1 year, $1.5 million
OLB	Brandon Copeland	New York Jets	March 25, 2020	1 year, $1.1 million
QB	Brian Hoyer	Indianapolis Colts	March 25, 2020	1 year, $1.1 million
WR	Marqise Lee	Jacksonville Jaguars	April 28, 2020	1 year, $1.1 million
QB	Cam Newton	Carolina Panthers	July 8, 2020	1 year, $7.5 million
WR	Will Hastings	New England Patriots	July 27, 2020	1 year, $610,000
QB	Brian Lewerke	New England Patriots	July 30, 2020	1 year, $610,000
WR	Isaiah Zuber	New England Patriots	August 5, 2020	1 year, $610,000
DT	Darius Kilgo	Detroit Lions	August 11, 2020	1 year, $825,000
C	Tyler Gauthier	Jacksonville Jaguars	August 12, 2020	1 year, $675,000
RB	Lamar Miller	Houston Texans	August 13, 2020	1 year, $2.55 million
G	Ben Braden	New York Jets	August 17, 2020	1 year, $675,000
TE	Paul Butler	Oakland Raiders	August 17, 2020	1 year, $610,000
TE	Alex Ellis	Philadelphia Eagles	August 17, 2020	1 year, $825,000
TE	Paul Quessenberry	N/A	August 22, 2020	3 years, $2.3 million
DT	Xavier Williams	Kansas City Chiefs	August 22, 2020	1 year, $910,000
WR	Andre Baccellia	Kansas City Chiefs	August 29, 2020	1 year, $610,000

Indicates that the player was a free agent at the end of his respective team's 2019 season.

=== Releases/waivers ===
Position	Player	2020 team	Date released/waived
K	Stephen Gostkowski	Tennessee Titans	March 23, 2020
QB	Cody Kessler		April 1, 2020
DE	Keionta Davis		April 27, 2020
S	Obi Melifonwu		April 27, 2020
CB	Lenzy Pipkins		July 25, 2020
S	Malik Gant		July 26, 2020
WR	Will Hastings		July 26, 2020
QB	Brian Lewerke		July 26, 2020
S	Adarius Pickett		July 26, 2020
WR	Sean Riley		July 26, 2020
QB	J'Mar Smith		July 26, 2020
LB	Kyahva Tezino		July 26, 2020
DT	Courtney Wallace		July 26, 2020
WR	Isaiah Zuber	New England Patriots	July 26, 2020
DE	Nick Coe	Miami Dolphins	August 13, 2020
WR	Quincy Adeboyejo	New England Patriots	August 15, 2020
TE	Alex Ellis		August 22, 2020
DT	Darius Kilgo	Denver Broncos	August 22, 2020
WR	Will Hastings		August 28, 2020
DT	Michael Barnett		September 3, 2020
CB	Mike Jackson Sr.	New England Patriots	September 3, 2020
WR	Mohamed Sanu	San Francisco 49ers	September 3, 2020
WR	Andre Baccellia		September 5, 2020
TE	Rashod Berry	New England Patriots	September 5, 2020
DE	Tashawn Bower	New England Patriots	September 5, 2020
G	Ben Braden	Green Bay Packers	September 5, 2020
CB	Myles Bryant	New England Patriots	September 5, 2020
TE	Jake Burt	New England Patriots	September 5, 2020
TE	Paul Butler		September 5, 2020
K	Nick Folk	New England Patriots	September 5, 2020
C	Tyler Gauthier	Miami Dolphins	September 5, 2020
LB	Terez Hall	New England Patriots	September 5, 2020
LB	De'Jon Harris	Green Bay Packers	September 5, 2020
QB	Brian Lewerke		September 5, 2020
LB	Cassh Maluia	New England Patriots	September 5, 2020
RB	Lamar Miller	Chicago Bears	September 5, 2020
DT	Bill Murray	New England Patriots	September 5, 2020
TE	Paul Quessenberry	New England Patriots	September 5, 2020
K	Justin Rohrwasser	New England Patriots	September 5, 2020
CB	D'Angelo Ross	New England Patriots	September 5, 2020
WR	Devin Ross	New England Patriots	September 5, 2020
RB	J. J. Taylor	New England Patriots	September 5, 2020
WR	Jeff Thomas		September 5, 2020
DE	Nick Thurman	New England Patriots	September 5, 2020
DT	Xavier Williams	Cincinnati Bengals	September 5, 2020
WR	Isaiah Zuber	New England Patriots	September 5, 2020
LB	Cassh Maluia	New England Patriots	November 10, 2020
G	Hjalte Froholdt	Houston Texans	November 21, 2020
LB	Derek Rivers	Los Angeles Rams	November 21, 2020
WR	Isaiah Ford	Miami Dolphins	December 5, 2020

=== Retirements ===
Position	Player	Date retired
TE	Benjamin Watson	March 18, 2020
FB	James Develin	April 27, 2020
C	Dustin Woodard	August 13, 2020

=== Trades ===
- March 18 – The Patriots traded safety Duron Harmon and a 2020 seventh-round selection (No. 235 overall) to the Detroit Lions in exchange for the Lions' 2020 fifth-round selection (No. 172 overall).
- April 21 – The Patriots traded tight end Rob Gronkowski and a 2020 seventh-round selection (No. 241 overall) to the Tampa Bay Buccaneers in exchange for the Buccaneers' fourth-round selection (No. 139 overall).
- August 9 – The Patriots traded a conditional 2022 seventh-round selection to the Detroit Lions in exchange for cornerback Mike Jackson Sr.
- November 3 – The Patriots traded a 2022 seventh-round selection to the Miami Dolphins in exchange for wide receiver Isaiah Ford.

== Draft ==
2020 New England Patriots Draft
Round	Selection	Player	Position	College	Notes
2	37	Kyle Dugger	S	Lenoir-Rhyne	from Los Angeles Chargers
2	60	Josh Uche	OLB	Michigan	from Baltimore
3	87	Anfernee Jennings	OLB	Alabama	
3	91	Devin Asiasi	TE	UCLA	from Las Vegas
3	101	Dalton Keene	TE	Virginia Tech	from Seattle via New York Jets
5	159	Justin Rohrwasser	K	Marshall	from Las Vegas
6	182	Michael Onwenu	G	Michigan	from Detroit via Indianapolis
6	195	Justin Herron	OT	Wake Forest	from Denver
6	204	Cassh Maluia	MLB	Wyoming	from Houston
7	230	Dustin Woodard	C	Memphis	from Atlanta

Notes

- New England traded a 2020 first-round selection (No. 23 overall) to the Los Angeles Chargers in exchange for a 2020 second-round selection (No. 37 overall) and a 2020 third-round selection (No. 71 overall).
- New England traded a 2020 second-round selection (No. 55 overall) to the Atlanta Falcons in exchange for wide receiver Mohamed Sanu.
- New England acquired a 2020 second-round selection (No. 60 overall) and a 2020 fourth-round selection (No. 129 overall) in exchange for two 2020 third-round selections (No. 71 overall and No. 98 overall).
- New England acquired a 2020 third-round selection (No. 91 overall) and a 2020 fifth-round selection (No. 159 overall) in exchange for a 2020 third-round selection (No. 100 overall), a 2020 fourth-round selection (No. 139 overall), and a 2020 fifth-round selection (No. 172 overall).
- New England acquired a 2020 third-round selection (No. 101 overall) in exchange for two 2020 fourth-round selections (No. 125 overall and No. 129 overall) and a 2021 sixth-round selection.
- New England acquired a 2020 fourth-round selection (No. 125 overall) as part of a trade that sent their 2019 third- and sixth-round selections to the Chicago Bears.
- New England acquired a 2020 fourth-round selection (No. 139 overall) as part of a trade that sent tight end Rob Gronkowski and a 2020 seventh-round selection (No. 241 overall) to the Tampa Bay Buccaneers.
- New England traded a 2020 fourth-round selection (No. 129 overall) to the Baltimore Ravens in exchange for offensive lineman Jermaine Eluemunor and a 2020 sixth-round selection (No. 207 overall).
- New England traded a 2020 fifth-round selection (No. 168 overall) to the Philadelphia Eagles in exchange for a 2020 seventh-round selection (No. 235 overall) and defensive lineman Michael Bennett.
- New England acquired a 2020 fifth-round selection (No. 172 overall) as a part of a trade that sent safety Duron Harmon and a 2020 seventh-round selection (No. 235 overall) to the Detroit Lions.
- New England acquired a 2020 sixth-round selection (No. 182 overall) as part of a trade that sent two 2020 sixth-round selections (No. 212 overall and No. 213 overall) to the Indianapolis Colts.
- New England acquired a 2020 sixth-round selection (No. 195 overall) as part of a trade that sent cornerback Duke Dawson and a 2020 seventh-round selection (No. 237 overall) to the Denver Broncos.
- New England traded a 2020 sixth-round selection (No. 202 overall) to the Arizona Cardinals in exchange for offensive tackle Korey Cunningham.
- New England acquired a 2020 sixth-round selection (No. 204 overall) as part of a trade that sent cornerback Keion Crossen to the Houston Texans.
- New England traded a 2020 sixth-round selection (No. 207 overall) to the Buffalo Bills in exchange for center Russell Bodine.
- New England acquired a 2020 seventh-round selection (No. 230 overall) as part of a trade that sent safety Jordan Richards to the Atlanta Falcons.
- New England acquired a 2020 seventh-round selection (No. 241 overall) as part of a trade that sent tight end Jacob Hollister to the Seattle Seahawks. As the result of the negative differential of free agent signings and departures that the Patriots experienced during the first wave of the 2019 free agency period, the team received the league-maximum four compensatory selections for the 2020 draft. Free agent transactions that occurred after May 7, 2019 did not factor into the team's formula for determining compensatory selections.

=== Undrafted free agents ===
Position	Player	Date signed
TE	Rashod Berry	May 5, 2020
CB	Myles Bryant	May 5, 2020
TE	Jake Burt	May 5, 2020
DE	Nick Coe	May 5, 2020
LB	De'Jon Harris	May 5, 2020
WR	Will Hastings	May 5, 2020
QB	Brian Lewerke	May 5, 2020
DT	Bill Murray	May 5, 2020
WR	Sean Riley	May 5, 2020
QB	J'Mar Smith	May 5, 2020
RB	J. J. Taylor	May 5, 2020
LB	Kyahva Tezino	May 5, 2020
WR	Jeff Thomas	May 5, 2020
DT	Courtney Wallace	May 5, 2020
WR	Isaiah Zuber	May 5, 2020
DT	Michael Barnett	August 24, 2020

== Staff ==
2020 New England Patriots staff
Front office: Chairman/CEO – Robert Kraft; President – Jonathan Kraft; Director of player personnel – Nick Caserio; Assistant director of player personnel – Dave Ziegler; College scouting coordinator – Brian Smith; Director of pro personnel – Vacant; Director of scouting administration – Nancy Meier; Football research director – Ernie Adams; Director of football/head coach administration – Berj Najarian; Scouting consultant – Eliot Wolf; Head coaches: Head coach – Bill Belichick; Offensive coaches: Offensive coordinator – Josh McDaniels; Quarterbacks – Jedd Fisch; Running backs/kick returners – Troy Brown; Running backs – Ivan Fears; Wide receivers – Mick Lombardi; Tight ends/fullbacks – Nick Caley; Offensive line – Carmen Bricillo; Offensive line – Cole Popovich; Offensive assistant – Tyler Hughes	Defensive coaches: Defensive line – DeMarcus Covington; Inside linebackers – Jerod Mayo; Outside linebackers – Steve Belichick; Cornerbacks – Mike Pellegrino; Safeties – Brian Belichick; Defensive assistant – Vinnie Sunseri; Special teams coaches: Special teams coordinator – Cam Achord; Special teams assistant – Joe Houston; Strength and conditioning: Head strength and conditioning – Moses Cabrera; Strength and conditioning assistant – Deron Mayo; Director of skill development – Joe Kim

== Final roster ==
2020 New England Patriots roster
Quarterbacks (QB): 2 Brian Hoyer; 1 Cam Newton; 4 Jarrett Stidham; Running backs (RB): 47 Jakob Johnson FB; 26 Sony Michel; 42 J. J. Taylor; 28 James White; Wide receivers (WR): 10 Damiere Byrd; 15 N'Keal Harry; 16 Jakobi Meyers; 14 Donte Moncrief KR; 80 Gunner Olszewski PR; 18 Matthew Slater; Tight ends (TE): 86 Devin Asiasi; 44 Dalton Keene	Offensive linemen (OL): 60 David Andrews C; 74 Korey Cunningham T; 72 Jermaine Eluemunor G; 66 James Ferentz C; 75 Justin Herron T; 68 Marcus Martin C; 69 Shaq Mason G; 71 Michael Onwenu T; 62 Joe Thuney G; Defensive linemen (DL): 43 Rashod Berry DE; 70 Adam Butler DE; 99 Byron Cowart DT; 93 Lawrence Guy DT; 52 Akeem Spence DT; 50 Chase Winovich DE; 91 Deatrich Wise Jr. DE	Linebackers (LB): 51 Ja'Whaun Bentley MLB; 90 Shilique Calhoun OLB; 59 Terez Hall OLB; 58 Anfernee Jennings OLB; 46 Cassh Maluia MLB; 55 John Simon OLB; Defensive backs (DB): 29 Justin Bethel SS; 25 Terrence Brooks FS; 41 Myles Bryant CB; 22 Cody Davis FS; 35 Kyle Dugger SS; 27 J. C. Jackson CB; 45 Mike Jackson Sr. CB; 31 Jonathan Jones CB; 32 Devin McCourty FS; 30 Jason McCourty CB; 21 Adrian Phillips SS; 38 Dee Virgin CB; 33 Joejuan Williams CB; Special teams (ST): 7 Jake Bailey P; 49 Joe Cardona LS; 6 Nick Folk K	Practice squad: 9 Roberto Aguayo K; 65 Caleb Benenoch G (PS/I); 82 Jake Burt TE (PS/I); 8 Jake Dolegala QB; 94 Isaiah Mack DT (COVID-19); 97 Bill Murray DT; 48 Michael Pinckney LB (Susp.); 64 Ross Reynolds G; 5 Justin Rohrwasser K; 39 D'Angelo Ross CB; 13 Devin Smith WR; 67 Jordan Steckler T; 92 Nick Thurman DT; 17 Kristian Wilkerson WR; 19 Isaiah Zuber WR; Reserve: 19 Quincy Adeboyejo WR (IR); 94 Beau Allen DT (IR); 76 Michael Barnett DT (IR); 38 Brandon Bolden RB (Opt-out); 96 Tashawn Bower DE (IR); 34 Rex Burkhead RB (IR); 77 Yodny Cajuste T (IR); 61 Marcus Cannon T (Opt-out); 23 Patrick Chung SS (Opt-out); 52 Brandon Copeland OLB (IR); 98 Carl Davis DT (IR); 11 Julian Edelman WR (IR); 24 Stephon Gilmore CB (IR); 37 Damien Harris RB (IR); 54 Dont'a Hightower MLB (Opt-out); 85 Ryan Izzo TE (IR); 36 Brandon King OLB (PUP); 83 Matt LaCosse TE (Opt-out); 13 Marqise Lee WR (Opt-out); 68 Najee Toran G (Opt-out); 53 Josh Uche OLB (IR); 45 Danny Vitale FB (Opt-out); 76 Isaiah Wynn T (IR); Rookies in italics 53 active, 23 reserve, 11 practice squad (4 exempt)

== Preseason ==
The Patriots' preseason schedule was announced on May 7, but was later cancelled due to the COVID-19 pandemic.

Week	Date	Opponent	Venue	Result
1	August 13	Detroit Lions	Gillette Stadium	Cancelled due to the COVID-19 pandemic
2	August 20	Carolina Panthers	Gillette Stadium	Cancelled due to the COVID-19 pandemic
3	August 27	at Philadelphia Eagles	Lincoln Financial Field	Cancelled due to the COVID-19 pandemic
4	September 3	at New York Giants	MetLife Stadium	Cancelled due to the COVID-19 pandemic

== Regular season ==
=== Schedule ===
The Patriots' 2020 schedule was announced on May 7.

Week	Date	Opponent	Result	Record	Venue	Recap
1	September 13	**Miami Dolphins**	**W** 21–11	1–0	Gillette Stadium	Recap
2	September 20	at Seattle Seahawks	**L** 30–35	1–1	CenturyLink Field	Recap
3	September 27	Las Vegas Raiders	**W** 36–20	2–1	Gillette Stadium	Recap
4 (Note: Due to positive COVID-19 tests from Chiefs' practice squad quarterback Jordan Ta'amu and Patriots' quarterback Cam Newton, the NFL announced the game would be postponed to give both teams time to see if any other players had caught the virus. Following all additional tests coming back negative, the NFL announced the game would be played on October 5.)	October 5	at Kansas City Chiefs	**L** 10–26	2–2	Arrowhead Stadium	Recap
5	Bye					
6 (Note: After the Patriots' game against the Chiefs, Patriots cornerback Stephon Gilmore tested positive for COVID-19. The Broncos announced the NFL had postponed the game to October 12. The game would later be postponed again after another positive case.)	October 18	Denver Broncos	**L** 12–18	2–3	Gillette Stadium	Recap
7	October 25	San Francisco 49ers	**L** 6–33	2–4	Gillette Stadium	Recap
8	November 1	at **Buffalo Bills**	**L** 21–24	2–5	Bills Stadium	Recap
9	November 9	at **New York Jets**	**W** 30–27	3–5	MetLife Stadium	Recap
10	November 15	Baltimore Ravens	**W** 23–17	4–5	Gillette Stadium	Recap
11	November 22	at Houston Texans	**L** 20–27	4–6	NRG Stadium	Recap
12	November 29	Arizona Cardinals	**W** 20–17	5–6	Gillette Stadium	Recap
13	December 6	at Los Angeles Chargers	**W** 45–0	6–6	SoFi Stadium	Recap
14	December 10	at Los Angeles Rams	**L** 3–24	6–7	SoFi Stadium	Recap
15	December 20	at **Miami Dolphins**	**L** 12–22	6–8	Hard Rock Stadium	Recap
16	December 28	**Buffalo Bills**	**L** 9–38	6–9	Gillette Stadium	Recap
17	January 3	**New York Jets**	**W** 28–14	7–9	Gillette Stadium	Recap

Note: Intra-division opponents are in bold text.

=== Game summaries ===
==== Week 1: vs. Miami Dolphins ====
Week One: Miami Dolphins at New England Patriots – Game summary

Quarter	1	2	3	4	Total
Dolphins	0	3	0	8	**11**
**Patriots**	0	7	7	7	**21**

at Gillette Stadium, Foxborough, Massachusetts

- Date: September 13
- Game time: 1:00 p.m. EDT
- Game weather: Partly cloudy, 70 °F (21 °C)
- Game attendance: 0
- Referee: Adrian Hill
- TV announcers (CBS): Jim Nantz, Tony Romo, Tracy Wolfson and Gene Steratore
- Recap, Game Book

Game information

**First quarter**

- No scoring plays.

**Second quarter**

- NE – Cam Newton 4-yard run (Nick Folk kick), 13:12 Patriots 7–0. **Drive: 11 plays, 80 yards, 6:11.**
- MIA – Jason Sanders 46-yard field goal, 3:53 Patriots 7–3. **Drive: 10 plays, 59 yards, 5:16.**

**Third quarter**

- NE – Cam Newton 11-yard run (Nick Folk kick), 10:14 Patriots 14–3. **Drive: 8 plays, 75 yards, 4:46.**

**Fourth quarter**

- MIA – Jordan Howard 1-yard run (Ryan Fitzpatrick run), 10:31 Patriots 14–11. **Drive: 11 plays, 80 yards, 5:23.**
- NE – Sony Michel 1-yard run (Nick Folk kick), 5:23 Patriots 21–11. **Drive: 10 plays, 75 yards, 5:08.**

**Top passers**

- MIA – Ryan Fitzpatrick – 20/30, 191 yards, 3 INT
- NE – Cam Newton – 15/19, 155 yards

**Top rushers**

- MIA – Myles Gaskin – 9 rushes, 40 yards
- NE – Cam Newton – 15 rushes, 75 yards, 2 TD

**Top receivers**

- MIA – DeVante Parker – 4 receptions, 47 yards
- NE – Julian Edelman – 5 receptions, 57 yards

This was the Patriots' first game without longtime quarterback Tom Brady since October 2, 2016, and their first without Brady on the roster since January 2, 2000. Nonetheless, new starting quarterback Cam Newton performed admirably, finishing with a 79% completion percentage and leading a rush-heavy offensive attack with 75 rushing yards and 2 touchdowns on the ground, as the Patriots finished with 217 rushing yards overall. With the win, New England opened the season at 1–0. This would be New England's last home opening win until 2026.

==== Week 2: at Seattle Seahawks ====
Week Two: New England Patriots at Seattle Seahawks – Game summary

Quarter	1	2	3	4	Total
Patriots	7	7	3	13	**30**
**Seahawks**	7	7	14	7	**35**

at CenturyLink Field, Seattle, Washington

- Date: September 20
- Game time: 8:20 p.m. EDT/5:20 p.m. PDT
- Game weather: 70 °F (21 °C)
- Game attendance: 0
- Referee: Craig Wrolstad
- TV announcers (NBC): Al Michaels, Cris Collinsworth, Michele Tafoya and Terry McAulay
- Recap, Game Book

Game information

**First quarter**

- NE – Devin McCourty 43-yard interception return (Nick Folk kick), 13:39. Patriots 7–0.
- SEA – Tyler Lockett 4-yard pass from Russell Wilson (Jason Myers kick), 5:27. Tied 7–7. **Drive: 13 plays, 75 yards, 8:12.**

**Second quarter**

- NE – Cam Newton 1-yard run (Nick Folk kick), 13:59. Patriots 14–7. **Drive: 12 plays, 72 yards, 6:28.**
- SEA – DK Metcalf 54-yard pass from Russell Wilson (Jason Myers kick), 6:57. Tied 14–14. **Drive: 4 plays, 75 yards, 1:51.**

**Third quarter**

- NE – Nick Folk 25-yard field goal, 10:12. Patriots 17–14. **Drive: 13 plays, 68 yards, 4:48.**
- SEA – David Moore 38-yard pass from Russell Wilson (Jason Myers kick), 7:04. Seahawks 21–17. **Drive: 6 plays, 75 yards, 3:08.**
- SEA – Freddie Swain 21-yard pass from Russell Wilson (Jason Myers kick), 2:00. Seahawks 28–17. **Drive: 5 plays, 52 yards, 2:30.**

**Fourth quarter**

- NE – Jakob Johnson 1-yard pass from Cam Newton (run failed), 14:14. Seahawks 28–23. **Drive: 6 plays, 77 yards, 2:46.**
- SEA – Chris Carson 18-yard pass from Russell Wilson (Jason Myers kick), 4:32. Seahawks 35–23. **Drive: 9 plays, 65 yards, 4:24.**
- NE – Cam Newton 1-yard run (Nick Folk kick), 2:16. Seahawks 35–30. **Drive: 7 plays, 75 yards, 2:16.**

**Top passers**

- NE – Cam Newton – 30/44, 397 yards, TD, INT
- SEA – Russell Wilson – 21/28, 288 yards, 5 TD, INT

**Top rushers**

- NE – Cam Newton – 11 rushes, 47 yards, 2 TD
- SEA – Chris Carson – 17 rushes, 72 yards

**Top receivers**

- NE – Julian Edelman – 8 receptions, 179 yards
- SEA – DK Metcalf – 4 receptions, 92 yards, TD

A competitive matchup versus the Seahawks on Sunday Night Football saw Seattle pull away during the third quarter, though the Patriots offense kept pace in the fourth quarter. A potential game-winning drive by the Patriots was snuffed out when Cam Newton, who passed for nearly 400 yards, was stuffed short of the goal line on a quarterback keeper in the final seconds of the game. This was New England's third loss in four career meetings with former Patriots head coach Pete Carroll. It was also Newton's sixth loss in eight career games against the Seahawks.

==== Week 3: vs. Las Vegas Raiders ====
Week Three: Las Vegas Raiders at New England Patriots – Game summary

Quarter	1	2	3	4	Total
Raiders	3	7	0	10	**20**
**Patriots**	0	13	10	13	**36**

at Gillette Stadium, Foxborough, Massachusetts

- Date: September 27
- Game time: 1:00 p.m. EDT
- Game weather: 73 °F (23 °C), partly cloudy
- Game attendance: 0
- Referee: Ronald Torbert
- TV announcers (CBS): Jim Nantz, Tony Romo, Tracy Wolfson and Gene Steratore
- Recap, Game Book

Game information

**First quarter**

- LV – Daniel Carlson 29-yard field goal, 0:20. Raiders 3–0. **Drive: 4 plays, 3 yards, 1:35.**

**Second quarter**

- NE – Nick Folk 33-yard field goal, 12:32. Tied 3–3. **Drive: 9 plays, 60 yards, 2:46.**
- NE – Nick Folk 23-yard field goal, 7:56. Patriots 6–3. **Drive: 9 plays, 37 yards, 4:06.**
- NE – Rex Burkhead 11-yard pass from Cam Newton (Nick Folk kick), 0:34. Patriots 13–3. **Drive: 12 plays, 86 yards, 5:04.**
- LV – Foster Moreau 1-yard pass from Derek Carr (Daniel Carlson kick), 0:06. Patriots 13–10. **Drive: 4 plays, 75 yards, 0:28.**

**Third quarter**

- NE – Rex Burkhead 5-yard run (Nick Folk kick), 6:41. Patriots 20–10. **Drive: 7 plays, 69 yards, 4:02.**
- NE – Nick Folk 32-yard field goal, 1:28. Patriots 23–10. **Drive: 7 plays, 61 yards, 3:36.**

**Fourth quarter**

- LV – Daniel Carlson 25-yard field goal, 11:22. Patriots 23–13. **Drive: 11 plays, 68 yards, 5:06.**
- NE – Rex Burkhead 2-yard run (kick failed), 5:17. Patriots 29–13. **Drive: 10 plays, 86 yards, 6:05.**
- NE – Deatrich Wise 0-yard fumble recovery in end zone (Nick Folk kick), 5:09. Patriots 36–13.
- LV – Hunter Renfrow 13-yard pass from Derek Carr (Daniel Carlson kick), 1:54. Patriots 36–20. **Drive: 10 plays, 75 yards, 3:15.**

**Top passers**

- LV – Derek Carr – 24/32, 261 yards, 2 TD
- NE – Cam Newton – 17/28, 162 yards, TD, INT

**Top rushers**

- LV – Josh Jacobs – 16 rushes, 71 yards
- NE – Sony Michel – 9 rushes, 117 yards

**Top receivers**

- LV – Hunter Renfrow – 6 receptions, 84 yards, TD
- NE – Rex Burkhead – 7 receptions, 49 yards, TD

Running back Rex Burkhead scored three touchdowns in a blowout win over the previously undefeated Raiders with the Patriots rushing for 250 yards; the game was Belichick's 275th career win with the Patriots. This would be the last time the Patriots would either beat the Raiders or start 2–0 at home until 2026.

==== Week 4: at Kansas City Chiefs ====
Week Four: New England Patriots at Kansas City Chiefs – Game summary

Quarter	1	2	3	4	Total
Patriots	0	3	0	7	**10**
**Chiefs**	6	0	7	13	**26**

at Arrowhead Stadium, Kansas City, Missouri

- Date: October 5
- Game time: 7:05 p.m. EDT/6:05 p.m. CDT
- Game weather: Clear, 73 °F (23 °C)
- Game attendance: 12,729
- Referee: Tony Corrente
- TV announcers (CBS): Jim Nantz, Tony Romo, Tracy Wolfson and Gene Steratore
- Recap, Game Book

Game information

**First quarter**

- KC – Harrison Butker 23-yard field goal, 10:08. Chiefs 3–0. **Drive: 11 plays, 70 yards, 4:52.**
- KC – Harrison Butker 39-yard field goal, 0:13. Chiefs 6–0. **Drive: 8 plays, 75 yards, 4:25.**

**Second quarter**

- NE – Nick Folk 43-yard field goal, 9:31. Chiefs 6–3. **Drive: 13 plays, 60 yards, 5:20.**

**Third quarter**

- KC – Tyreek Hill 6-yard pass from Patrick Mahomes (Harrison Butker kick), 0:42. Chiefs 13–3. **Drive: 7 plays, 85 yards, 3:10.**

**Fourth quarter**

- NE – N'Keal Harry 4-yard pass from Jarrett Stidham (Nick Folk kick), 13:45. Chiefs 13–10. **Drive: 6 plays, 75 yards, 1:57.**
- KC – Mecole Hardman 6-yard pass from Patrick Mahomes (kick failed), 8:57. Chiefs 19–10. **Drive: 9 plays, 75 yards, 4:48.**
- KC – Tyrann Mathieu 25-yard interception return (Harrison Butker kick), 8:48. Chiefs 26–10.

**Top passers**

- NE – Brian Hoyer – 15/24, 130 yards, INT
- KC – Patrick Mahomes – 29/39, 236 yards, 2 TD

**Top rushers**

- NE – Damien Harris – 17 rushes, 100 yards
- KC – Clyde Edwards-Helaire – 16 rushes, 64 yards

**Top receivers**

- NE – Damiere Byrd – 5 receptions, 80 yards
- KC – Travis Kelce – 3 receptions, 70 yards

The game was postponed to Monday night after Cam Newton tested positive for COVID-19. With Newton out, backup quarterback Brian Hoyer made the start for the Patriots. A low-scoring defensive affair in the first half saw the New England defense shut down Super Bowl MVP Patrick Mahomes for much of the half, though the Patriots offense was likewise ineffective, with Hoyer taking a sack on the last play of the first half that prevented a potential game-tying field goal. Mahomes and the Chiefs offense came to life late in the third quarter, scoring two touchdowns on back-to-back drives as Hoyer was benched for Jarrett Stidham, who threw his first career touchdown but also two interceptions, including a pick-six to Tyrann Mathieu that all but sealed the game and dropped New England to 2–2.

==== Week 6: vs. Denver Broncos ====
Week Six: Denver Broncos at New England Patriots – Game summary

Quarter	1	2	3	4	Total
**Broncos**	6	6	6	0	**18**
Patriots	0	3	0	9	**12**

at Gillette Stadium, Foxborough, Massachusetts

- Date: October 18
- Game time: 1:00 p.m. EDT
- Game weather: Sunny, 58 °F (14 °C)
- Game attendance: 0
- Referee: Scott Novak
- TV announcers (CBS): Kevin Harlan, Trent Green and Melanie Collins
- Recap, Game Book

Game information

**First quarter**

- DEN – Brandon McManus 45-yard field goal, 13:02. Broncos 3–0. **Drive: 6 plays, 48 yards, 1:58.**
- DEN – Brandon McManus 44-yard field goal, 8:05. Broncos 6–0. **Drive: 4 plays, 8 yards, 1:27.**

**Second quarter**

- DEN – Brandon McManus 27-yard field goal, 12:13. Broncos 9–0. **Drive: 13 plays, 83 yards, 5:54.**
- NE – Nick Folk 41-yard field goal, 5:20. Broncos 9–3. **Drive: 12 plays, 59 yards, 6:53.**
- DEN – Brandon McManus 52-yard field goal, 0:19. Broncos 12–3. **Drive: 12 plays, 48 yards, 5:01.**

**Third quarter**

- DEN – Brandon McManus 20-yard field goal, 3:32. Broncos 15–3. **Drive: 15 plays, 83 yards, 9:07.**
- DEN – Brandon McManus 54-yard field goal, 0:37. Broncos 18–3. **Drive: 4 plays, 6 yards, 1:31.**

**Fourth quarter**

- NE – Cam Newton 1-yard run (run failed), 8:31. Broncos 18–9. **Drive: 5 plays, 65 yards, 1:43.**
- NE – Nick Folk 38-yard field goal, 3:23. Broncos 18–12. **Drive: 4 plays, 5 yards, 1:52.**

**Top passers**

- DEN – Drew Lock – 10/24, 189 yards, 2 INT
- NE – Cam Newton – 17/25, 157 yards, 2 INT

**Top rushers**

- DEN – Phillip Lindsay – 23 rushes, 101 yards
- NE – Cam Newton – 10 rushes, 76 yards, TD

**Top receivers**

- DEN – Tim Patrick – 4 receptions, 101 yards
- NE – James White – 8 receptions, 65 yards

Despite scoring the game's only touchdown, this was the Patriots' first home loss to Denver in 14 years as they fell below .500, the first time they failed to be above .500 following Week 6 since 2002. In addition, it was the first time the Patriots lost without giving up a touchdown in the Bill Belichick era.

==== Week 7: vs. San Francisco 49ers ====
Week Seven: San Francisco 49ers at New England Patriots – Game summary

Quarter	1	2	3	4	Total
**49ers**	7	16	7	3	**33**
Patriots	0	3	3	0	**6**

at Gillette Stadium, Foxborough, Massachusetts

- Date: October 25
- Game time: 4:25 p.m. EDT
- Game weather: Cloudy, 49 °F (9 °C)
- Game attendance: 0
- Referee: Shawn Smith
- TV announcers (CBS): Jim Nantz, Tony Romo and Tracy Wolfson
- Recap, Game Book

Game information

**First quarter**

- SF – Jeff Wilson 3-yard run (Robbie Gould kick), 9:56. 49ers 7–0. **Drive: 9 plays, 75 yards, 5:04.**

**Second quarter**

- NE – Nick Folk 40-yard field goal, 14:56. 49ers 7–3. **Drive: 6 plays, 30 yards, 2:06.**
- SF – Robbie Gould 41-yard field goal, 9:00. 49ers 10–3. **Drive: 10 plays, 56 yards, 5:56.**
- SF – Kyle Juszczyk 4-yard run (kick failed), 6:23. 49ers 16–3. **Drive: 5 plays, 38 yards, 2:23.**
- SF – Jeff Wilson 16-yard run (Robbie Gould kick), 0:59. 49ers 23–3. **Drive: 7 plays, 84 yards, 3:43.**

**Third quarter**

- NE – Nick Folk 41-yard field goal, 10:48. 49ers 23–6. **Drive: 8 plays, 50 yards, 4:12.**
- SF – Jeff Wilson 7-yard run (Robbie Gould kick), 7:32. 49ers 30–6. **Drive: 6 plays, 79 yards, 3:16.**

**Fourth quarter**

- SF – Robbie Gould 32-yard field goal, 13:27. 49ers 33–6. **Drive: 10 plays, 55 yards, 6:20.**

**Top passers**

- SF – Jimmy Garoppolo – 20/25, 277 yards, 2 INT
- NE – Cam Newton – 9/15, 98 yards, 3 INT

**Top rushers**

- SF – Jeff Wilson – 17 rushes, 112 yards, 3 TD
- NE – Damien Harris – 10 rushes, 58 yards

**Top receivers**

- SF – Brandon Aiyuk – 6 receptions, 115 yards
- NE – Jakobi Meyers – 4 receptions, 60 yards

49ers quarterback Jimmy Garoppolo made his first return to New England since the Patriots traded him to San Francisco in October 2017. Garoppolo played for the Patriots from 2014 to 2017 and was part of their 2014 and 2016 Super Bowl-winning teams. This was the Patriots' worst home loss in the Belichick era and their worst loss since their 2003 season opener versus the Buffalo Bills, where they were shut out 31–0. It was also the Patriots' first time losing three games in a row since 2002. This was also the final game of Julian Edelman’s career, as he would undergo a precautionary procedure to address his chronic injury, land on the IR, and miss the final 10 games of the season. He announced his retirement on April 12, 2021.

==== Week 8: at Buffalo Bills ====
Week Eight: New England Patriots at Buffalo Bills – Game summary

Quarter	1	2	3	4	Total
Patriots	0	6	8	7	**21**
**Bills**	7	0	7	10	**24**

at Bills Stadium, Orchard Park, New York

- Date: November 1
- Game time: 1:00 p.m. EST
- Game weather: Rain, 41 °F (5 °C)
- Game attendance: 0
- Referee: Clete Blakeman
- TV announcers (CBS): Ian Eagle, Charles Davis and Evan Washburn
- Recap, Game Book

Game information

**First quarter**

- BUF – Zack Moss 8-yard run (Tyler Bass kick), 5:29. Bills 7–0. **Drive: 10 plays, 78 yards, 5:10.**

**Second quarter**

- NE – Nick Folk 43-yard field goal, 10:50. Bills 7–3. **Drive: 8 plays, 44 yards, 4:10.**
- NE – Nick Folk 33-yard field goal, 0:08. Bills 7–6. **Drive: 7 plays, 34 yards, 1:30.**

**Third quarter**

- BUF – Zack Moss 4-yard run (Tyler Bass kick), 12:09. Bills 14–6. **Drive: 5 plays, 75 yards, 2:51.**
- NE – Damien Harris 22-yard run (Cam Newton-Jakobi Meyers pass), 3:03. Tied 14–14. **Drive: 5 plays, 37 yards, 2:49.**

**Fourth quarter**

- BUF – Josh Allen 2-yard run (Tyler Bass kick), 13:12. Bills 21–14. **Drive: 9 plays, 45 yards, 4:51.**
- NE – Cam Newton 2-yard run (Nick Folk kick), 9:36. Tied 21–21. **Drive: 7 plays, 72 yards, 3:36.**
- BUF – Tyler Bass 28-yard field goal, 4:06. Bills 24–21. **Drive: 10 plays, 63 yards, 5:30.**

**Top passers**

- NE – Cam Newton – 15/25, 174 yards
- BUF – Josh Allen – 11/18, 154 yards, INT

**Top rushers**

- NE – Damien Harris – 16 rushes, 102 yards, TD
- BUF – Devin Singletary – 14 rushes, 86 yards

**Top receivers**

- NE – Jakobi Meyers – 6 receptions, 58 yards
- BUF – Stefon Diggs – 6 receptions, 92 yards

A game that featured strong rushing performances by both teams was played down to the wire. As the Patriots were driving down the field for a score to win or tie the game down 24–21 in the last two minutes, Bills defensive tackle Justin Zimmer forced Cam Newton to fumble at the Buffalo 14-yard line, sealing the loss for New England. This was the Patriots' first loss to the Bills in four years. It was also their first road loss to them since their 2011 AFC Championship season.

==== Week 9: at New York Jets ====
Week Nine: New England Patriots at New York Jets – Game summary

Quarter	1	2	3	4	Total
**Patriots**	7	3	7	13	**30**
Jets	3	17	7	0	**27**

at MetLife Stadium, East Rutherford, New Jersey

- Date: November 9
- Game time: 8:15 p.m. EST
- Game weather: Clear, 61 °F (16 °C)
- Game attendance: 0
- Referee: Alex Kemp
- TV announcers (ESPN): Steve Levy, Brian Griese, Louis Riddick, Lisa Salters and John Parry
- Recap, Game Book

Game information

**First quarter**

- NYJ – Sergio Castillo 35-yard field goal, 8:33. Jets 3–0. **Drive: 12 plays, 58 yards, 6:27.**
- NE – Cam Newton 5-yard run (Nick Folk kick), 3:34. Patriots 7–3. **Drive: 8 plays, 75 yards, 4:59.**

**Second quarter**

- NYJ – Breshad Perriman 50-yard pass from Joe Flacco (Sergio Castillo kick), 9:59. Jets 10–7. **Drive: 5 plays, 93 yards, 2:44.**
- NYJ – Sergio Castillo 50-yard field goal, 4:33. Jets 13–7. **Drive: 5 plays, 25 yards, 1:40.**
- NE – Nick Folk 45-yard field goal, 1:03. Jets 13–10. **Drive: 9 plays, 54 yards, 3:30.**
- NYJ – Jamison Crowder 50-yard pass from Joe Flacco (Sergio Castillo kick), 0:25. Jets 20–10. **Drive: 2 plays, 77 yards, 0:38.**

**Third quarter**

- NE – Rex Burkhead 1-yard run (Nick Folk kick), 7:27. Jets 20–17. **Drive: 13 plays, 78 yards, 7:33.**
- NYJ – Breshad Perriman 15-yard pass from Joe Flacco (Sergio Castillo kick), 0:30. Jets 27–17. **Drive: 11 plays, 75 yards, 6:57.**

**Fourth quarter**

- NE – Nick Folk 29-yard field goal, 6:04. Jets 27–20. **Drive: 17 plays, 58 yards, 9:26.**
- NE – Cam Newton 1-yard run (Nick Folk kick), 1:57. Tied 27–27. **Drive: 11 plays, 72 yards, 3:53.**
- NE – Nick Folk 51-yard field goal, 0:00. Patriots 30–27. **Drive: 8 plays, 45 yards, 0:47.**

**Top passers**

- NE – Cam Newton – 27/35, 274 yards
- NYJ – Joe Flacco – 18/25, 262 yards, 3 TD, 1 INT

**Top rushers**

- NE – Damien Harris – 14 rushes, 71 yards
- NYJ – Frank Gore – 12 rushes, 46 yards

**Top receivers**

- NE – Jakobi Meyers – 12 receptions, 169 yards
- NYJ – Breshad Perriman – 5 receptions, 101 yards, 2 TD

Against the winless Jets, the Patriots fell behind 20–10 by halftime, but mounted a comeback, limiting the Jets to just four plays in the fourth quarter. Nick Folk's game-winning 51 yard field goal as time expired ended the Patriots' four-game losing streak, got them their first road win of the year and their 9th win over the Jets since 2015. New England began 3–5 for the first time since 1994.

==== Week 10: vs. Baltimore Ravens ====
Week Ten: Baltimore Ravens at New England Patriots – Game summary

Quarter	1	2	3	4	Total
Ravens	0	10	7	0	**17**
**Patriots**	0	13	10	0	**23**

at Gillette Stadium, Foxborough, Massachusetts

- Date: November 15
- Game time: 8:20 p.m. EST
- Game weather: Rain, 52 °F (11 °C)
- Game attendance: 0
- Referee: Shawn Hochuli
- TV announcers (NBC): Al Michaels, Cris Collinsworth, Michele Tafoya and Terry McAulay
- Recap, Game Book

Game information

**First quarter**

- No scoring plays.

**Second quarter**

- BAL – Willie Snead 6-yard pass from Lamar Jackson (Justin Tucker kick), 14:54. Ravens 7–0. **Drive: 13 plays, 94 yards, 8:04.**
- NE – Rex Burkhead 7-yard pass from Cam Newton (Nick Folk kick), 11:46. Tied 7–7. **Drive: 7 plays, 75 yards, 3:08.**
- BAL – Justin Tucker 24-yard field goal, 5:32. Ravens 10–7. **Drive: 11 plays, 69 yards, 6:14.**
- NE – Rex Burkhead 24-yard pass from Jakobi Meyers (kick failed, wide left), 1:02. Patriots 13–10. **Drive: 10 plays, 75 yards, 4:30.**

**Third quarter**

- NE – Cam Newton 4-yard run (Nick Folk kick), 13:17. Patriots 20–10. **Drive: 4 plays, 75 yards, 1:43.**
- NE – Nick Folk 20-yard field goal, 6:24. Patriots 23–10. **Drive: 7 plays, 35 yards, 3:16.**
- BAL – Willie Snead 18-yard pass from Lamar Jackson (Justin Tucker kick), 0:08. Patriots 23–17. **Drive: 11 plays, 75 yards, 6:16.**

**Fourth quarter**

- No scoring plays.

**Top passers**

- BAL – Lamar Jackson – 24/34, 249 yards, 2 TD, INT
- NE – Cam Newton – 13/17, 118 yards, TD

**Top rushers**

- BAL – Lamar Jackson – 11 rushes, 55 yards
- NE – Damien Harris – 22 rushes, 121 yards

**Top receivers**

- BAL – Jakobi Meyers – 5 receptions, 59 yards
- NE – Willie Snead – 5 receptions, 64 yards, 2 TD

==== Week 11: at Houston Texans ====
Week Eleven: New England Patriots at Houston Texans – Game summary

Quarter	1	2	3	4	Total
Patriots	7	3	7	3	**20**
**Texans**	7	14	3	3	**27**

at NRG Stadium, Houston, Texas

- Date: November 22
- Game time: 1:00 p.m. EST/12:00 p.m. CST
- Game weather: Partly cloudy, 79 °F (26 °C) (retractable roof open)
- Game attendance: 12,503
- Referee: John Hussey
- TV announcers (CBS): Andrew Catalon, James Lofton and AJ Ross
- Recap, Game Book

Game information

**First quarter**

- NE – Damien Harris 9-yard run (Nick Folk kick), 6:52. Patriots 7–0. **Drive: 10 plays, 84 yards, 5:32.**
- HOU – Randall Cobb 3-yard pass from Deshaun Watson (Kaʻimi Fairbairn kick), 3:36. Tied 7–7. **Drive: 6 plays, 73 yards, 3:16.**

**Second quarter**

- NE – Nick Folk 45-yard field goal, 8:32. Patriots 10–7. **Drive: 10 plays, 45 yards, 5:05.**
- HOU – Deshaun Watson 4-yard run (Kaʻimi Fairbairn kick), 3:54. Texans 14–10. **Drive: 8 plays, 75 yards, 4:38.**
- HOU – Keke Coutee 6-yard pass from Deshaun Watson (Kaʻimi Fairbairn kick), 0:10. Texans 21–10. **Drive: 9 plays, 80 yards, 2:10.**

**Third quarter**

- NE – Damiere Byrd 42-yard pass from Cam Newton (Nick Folk kick), 8:14. Texans 21–17. **Drive: 7 plays, 82 yards, 2:43.**
- HOU – Kaʻimi Fairbairn 36-yard field goal, 2:04. Texans 24–17. **Drive: 11 plays, 57 yards, 6:10.**

**Fourth quarter**

- NE – Nick Folk 36-yard field goal, 7:39. Texans 24–20. **Drive: 16 plays, 65 yards, 9:25.**
- HOU – Kaʻimi Fairbairn 46-yard field goal, 4:11. Texans 27–20. **Drive: 8 plays, 47 yards, 3:28.**

**Top passers**

- NE – Cam Newton – 26/40, 365 yards, TD
- HOU – Deshaun Watson – 28/37, 344 yards, 2 TD

**Top rushers**

- NE – Damien Harris – 11 rushes, 43 yards, TD
- HOU – Deshaun Watson – 6 rushes, 36 yards, TD

**Top receivers**

- NE – Damiere Byrd – 6 receptions, 132 yards, TD
- HOU – Brandin Cooks – 4 receptions, 85 yards

==== Week 12: vs. Arizona Cardinals ====
Week Twelve: Arizona Cardinals at New England Patriots – Game summary

Quarter	1	2	3	4	Total
Cardinals	10	0	0	7	**17**
**Patriots**	0	7	10	3	**20**

at Gillette Stadium, Foxborough, Massachusetts

- Date: November 29
- Game time: 1:00 p.m. EST
- Game weather: Sunny, 52 °F (11 °C)
- Game attendance: 0
- Referee: Bill Vinovich
- TV announcers (Fox): Kevin Burkhardt, Daryl Johnston and Pam Oliver
- Recap, Game Book

Game information

**First quarter**

- ARI – Kenyan Drake 1-yard run (Zane Gonzalez kick), 12:09. Cardinals 7–0. **Drive: 2 plays, 23 yards, 1:29.**
- ARI – Zane Gonzalez 47-yard field goal, 1:49. Cardinals 10–0. **Drive: 12 plays, 68 yards, 5:24.**

**Second quarter**

- NE – James White 7-yard run (Nick Folk kick), 14:15. Cardinals 10–7. **Drive: 7 plays, 46 yards, 2:34.**

**Third quarter**

- NE – Nick Folk 22-yard field goal, 7:46. Tied 10–10. **Drive: 8 plays, 35 yards, 3:57.**
- NE – James White 1-yard run (Nick Folk kick), 3:30. Patriots 17–10. **Drive: 6 plays, 31 yards, 2:51.**

**Fourth quarter**

- ARI – Kenyan Drake 1-yard run (Zane Gonzalez kick), 8:02. Tied 17–17. **Drive: 16 plays, 80 yards, 7:19.**
- NE – Nick Folk 50-yard field goal, 0:00. Patriots 20–17. **Drive: 7 plays, 33 yards, 1:47.**

**Top passers**

- ARI – Kyler Murray – 23/34, 170 yards, INT
- NE – Cam Newton – 9/18, 84 yards, 2 INT

**Top rushers**

- ARI – Kenyan Drake – 22 rushes, 78 yards, 2 TD
- NE – Damien Harris – 14 rushes, 47 yards

**Top receivers**

- ARI – DeAndre Hopkins – 5 receptions, 55 yards
- NE – Jakobi Meyers – 5 receptions, 52 yards

==== Week 13: at Los Angeles Chargers ====
Week Thirteen: New England Patriots at Los Angeles Chargers – Game summary

Quarter	1	2	3	4	Total
**Patriots**	7	21	7	10	**45**
Chargers	0	0	0	0	**0**

at SoFi Stadium, Inglewood, California

- Date: December 6
- Game time: 4:25 p.m. EST/1:25 p.m. PST
- Game weather: Clear, 70 °F (21 °C)
- Game attendance: 0
- Referee: Carl Cheffers
- TV announcers (CBS): Kevin Harlan, Trent Green and Amanda Balionis
- Recap, Game Book

Game information

**First quarter**

- NE – Cam Newton 1-yard run (Nick Folk kick), 7:50. Patriots 7–0. **Drive: 13 plays, 75 yards, 7:10.**

**Second quarter**

- NE – Gunner Olszewski 70-yard punt return (Nick Folk kick), 14:02. Patriots 14–0.
- NE – Cam Newton 2-yard run (Nick Folk kick), 0:51. Patriots 21–0. **Drive: 16 plays, 54 yards, 5:41.**
- NE – Devin McCourty 44-yard return of blocked field goal (Nick Folk kick), 0:00. Patriots 28–0.

**Third quarter**

- NE – N'Keal Harry 5-yard pass from Cam Newton (Nick Folk kick), 8:44. Patriots 35–0. **Drive: 7 plays, 32 yards, 3:38.**

**Fourth quarter**

- NE – Nick Folk 32-yard field goal, 11:21. Patriots 38–0. **Drive: 4 plays, 3 yards, 2:04.**
- NE – Gunner Olszewski 38-yard pass from Jarrett Stidham (Nick Folk kick), 6:50. Patriots 45–0. **Drive: 4 plays, 61 yards, 1:23.**

**Top passers**

- NE – Cam Newton – 12/19, 69 yards, TD
- LAC – Justin Herbert – 26/53, 209 yards

**Top rushers**

- NE – Damien Harris – 16 rushes, 80 yards
- LAC – Austin Ekeler – 8 rushes, 36 yards

**Top receivers**

- NE – Gunner Olszewski – 1 reception, 38 yards, TD
- LAC – Keenan Allen – 5 receptions, 48 yards

==== Week 14: at Los Angeles Rams ====
Week Fourteen: New England Patriots at Los Angeles Rams – Game summary

Quarter	1	2	3	4	Total
Patriots	0	3	0	0	**3**
**Rams**	10	7	7	0	**24**

at SoFi Stadium, Inglewood, California

- Date: December 10
- Game time: 8:20 p.m. EST/5:20 p.m. PST
- Game weather: Clear, 60 °F (16 °C)
- Game attendance: 0
- Referee: Craig Wrolstad
- TV announcers (Fox/NFLN/Amazon Prime): Joe Buck, Troy Aikman, Erin Andrews and Kristina Pink
- Recap, Game Book

Game information

**First quarter**

- LAR – Jared Goff 1-yard run (Matt Gay kick), 11:21. Rams 7–0. **Drive: 6 plays, 75 yards, 3:39.**
- LAR – Matt Gay 35-yard field goal, 5:16. Rams 10–0. **Drive: 11 plays, 60 yards, 4:25.**

**Second quarter**

- LAR – Kenny Young 79-yard interception return (Matt Gay kick), 14:46. Rams 17–0.
- NE – Nick Folk 29-yard field goal, 1:04. Rams 17–3. **Drive: 8 plays, 57 yards, 3:36.**

**Third quarter**

- LAR – Cooper Kupp 2-yard pass from Jared Goff (Matt Gay kick), 1:33. Rams 24–3. **Drive: 16 plays, 90 yards, 9:42.**

**Fourth quarter**

- No scoring plays.

**Top passers**

- NE – Cam Newton – 9/16, 119 yards, INT
- LAR – Jared Goff – 16/25, 137 yards, TD, INT

**Top rushers**

- NE – Damien Harris – 11 rushes, 50 yards
- LAR – Cam Akers – 29 rushes, 171 yards

**Top receivers**

- NE – Damiere Byrd – 5 receptions, 48 yards
- LAR – Tyler Higbee – 5 receptions, 33 yards, TD

Despite 4 red zone trips, the Patriots’ only score came from a Nick Folk field goal; their three points scored were the lowest the Patriots have scored in a game since a 2016 Week 4 shutout against the Buffalo Bills. This was also their fewest points scored in a game in which their first-string quarterback made a start, since a 2006 shutout loss against the Miami Dolphins (Brady was serving his four-game suspension in that 2016 loss against the Bills).

In addition, with the Bills beating the Steelers later on NBC Sunday Night Football, the Patriots had failed to win the AFC East for the first time since 2008.

==== Week 15: at Miami Dolphins ====
Week Fifteen: New England Patriots at Miami Dolphins – Game summary

Quarter	1	2	3	4	Total
Patriots	0	6	3	3	**12**
**Dolphins**	0	0	7	15	**22**

at Hard Rock Stadium, Miami Gardens, Florida

- Date: December 20
- Game time: 1:00 p.m. EST
- Game weather: Mostly cloudy, 79 °F (26 °C)
- Game attendance: 13,354
- Referee: Brad Allen
- TV announcers (CBS): Ian Eagle, Charles Davis and Evan Washburn
- Recap, Game Book

Game information

**First quarter**

- No scoring plays.

**Second quarter**

- NE – Nick Folk 45-yard field goal, 8:55. Patriots 3–0. **Drive: 13 plays, 69 yards, 6:10.**
- NE – Nick Folk 36-yard field goal, 4:19. Patriots 6–0. **Drive: 8 plays, 42 yards, 2:32.**

**Third quarter**

- MIA – Salvon Ahmed 1-yard run (Jason Sanders kick), 10:32. Dolphins 7–6. **Drive: 9 plays, 72 yards, 4:28.**
- NE – Nick Folk 45-yard field goal, 4:23. Patriots 9–7. **Drive: 8 plays, 65 yards, 3:16.**

**Fourth quarter**

- MIA – Tua Tagovailoa 3-yard run (Tua Tagovailoa–Salvon Ahmed pass), 12:55. Dolphins 15–9. **Drive: 14 plays, 90 yards, 6:25.**
- NE – Nick Folk 42-yard field goal, 9:07. Dolphins 15–12. **Drive: 9 plays, 51 yards, 3:52.**
- MIA – Tua Tagovailoa 1-yard run (Jason Sanders kick), 3:17. Dolphins 22–12. **Drive: 11 plays, 75 yards, 5:46.**

**Top passers**

- NE – Cam Newton – 17/27, 209 yards
- MIA – Tua Tagovailoa – 20/26, 145 yards, INT

**Top rushers**

- NE – Sony Michel – 10 rushes, 74 yards
- MIA – Salvon Ahmed – 23 rushes, 122 yards, TD

**Top receivers**

- NE – Jakobi Meyers – 7 receptions, 111 yards
- MIA – Durham Smythe – 5 receptions, 40 yards

With the loss, the Patriots were eliminated from the playoffs for the first time since 2008 and were ensured a non-winning season for the first time since 2000. During the 2nd quarter, cornerback and reigning Defensive Player of the Year Stephon Gilmore suffered a partially torn quad that would cause him to miss the remainder of the season. Quarterback Cam Newton also lost to the Dolphins for the first time in his 9-year career.

==== Week 16: vs. Buffalo Bills ====
Week Sixteen: Buffalo Bills at New England Patriots – Game summary

Quarter	1	2	3	4	Total
**Bills**	3	21	7	7	**38**
Patriots	3	6	0	0	**9**

at Gillette Stadium, Foxborough, Massachusetts

- Date: December 28
- Game time: 8:15 p.m. EST
- Game weather: Clear, 41 °F (5 °C)
- Game attendance: 0
- Referee: Ronald Torbert
- TV announcers (ESPN/ABC): Steve Levy, Brian Griese, Louis Riddick, Laura Rutledge and John Parry
- Recap, Game Book

Game information

**First quarter**

- NE – Nick Folk 45-yard field goal, 12:44. Patriots 3–0. **Drive: 6 plays, 38 yards, 2:16.**
- BUF – Tyler Bass 22-yard field goal, 6:43. Tied 3–3. **Drive: 10 plays, 49 yards, 6:01.**

**Second quarter**

- BUF – Zack Moss 5-yard run (Tyler Bass kick), 14:50. Bills 10–3. **Drive: 12 plays, 70 yards, 5:28.**
- NE – Cam Newton 9-yard run (kick failed), 10:39. Bills 10–9. **Drive: 9 plays, 90 yards, 4:11.**
- BUF – Lee Smith 4-yard pass from Josh Allen (Tyler Bass kick), 5:32. Bills 17–9. **Drive: 10 plays, 75 yards, 5:07.**
- BUF – Stefon Diggs 50-yard pass from Josh Allen (Tyler Bass kick), 3:55. Bills 24–9. **Drive: 3 plays, 67 yards, 0:47.**

**Third quarter**

- BUF – Stefon Diggs 18-yard pass from Josh Allen (Tyler Bass kick), 11:28. Bills 31–9. **Drive: 8 plays, 75 yards, 3:32.**

**Fourth quarter**

- BUF – Stefon Diggs 8-yard pass from Josh Allen (Tyler Bass kick), 13:16. Bills 38–9. **Drive: 10 plays, 95 yards, 7:25.**

**Top passers**

- BUF – Josh Allen – 27/36, 320 yards, 4 TD
- NE – Jarrett Stidham – 4/11, 44 yards

**Top rushers**

- BUF – Zack Moss – 12 rushes, 57 yards, TD
- NE – Sony Michel – 10 rushes, 69 yards

**Top receivers**

- BUF – Stefon Diggs – 9 receptions, 145 yards, 3 TD
- NE – Jakobi Meyers – 4 receptions, 45 yards

With the loss, the Patriots suffer their first losing record since 2000, and have been swept by the Bills for the first time since 1999 as well as for the first time under Bill Belichick's tenure. This is also the first time since 2000 a division rival swept New England. The 29 point home loss is the worst in the Bill Belichick era, and the 2nd worst loss overall (Buffalo won 31–0 in Week 1 of the 2003 season in then-Ralph Wilson Stadium).

==== Week 17: vs. New York Jets ====
Week Seventeen: New York Jets at New England Patriots – Game summary

Quarter	1	2	3	4	Total
Jets	0	7	7	0	**14**
**Patriots**	7	0	7	14	**28**

at Gillette Stadium, Foxborough, Massachusetts

- Date: January 3, 2021
- Game time: 1:00 p.m. EST
- Game weather: Cloudy, 33 °F (1 °C)
- Game attendance: 0
- Referee: Brad Rogers
- TV announcers (CBS): Tom McCarthy and Jay Feely
- Recap, Game Book

Game information

**First quarter**

- NE – James White 7-yard pass from Cam Newton (Nick Folk kick), 11:26. Patriots 7–0. **Drive: 7 plays, 84 yards, 3:37.**

**Second quarter**

- NYJ – Chris Herndon 21-yard pass from Sam Darnold (Chase McLaughlin kick), 1:40. Tied 7–7. **Drive: 10 plays, 80 yards, 4:07.**

**Third quarter**

- NYJ – Josh Adams 1-yard run (Chase McLaughlin kick), 11:40. Jets 14–7. **Drive: 6 plays, 75 yards, 3:20.**
- NE – Cam Newton 19-yard pass from Jakobi Meyers (Nick Folk kick), 2:22. Tied 14–14. **Drive: 10 plays, 58 yards, 4:45.**

**Fourth quarter**

- NE – Devin Asiasi 26-yard pass from Cam Newton (Nick Folk kick), 13:56. Patriots 21–14. **Drive: 4 plays, 45 yards, 1:13.**
- NE – Sony Michel 31-yard pass from Cam Newton (Nick Folk kick), 11:42. Patriots 28–14. **Drive: 2 plays, 57 yards, 0:29.**

**Top passers**

- NYJ – Sam Darnold – 23/34, 266 yards, TD, 2 INT
- NE – Cam Newton – 21/30, 242 yards, 3 TD

**Top rushers**

- NYJ – Josh Adams – 11 rushes, 47 yards, TD
- NE – Cam Newton – 11 rushes, 79 yards

**Top receivers**

- NYJ – Breshad Perriman – 3 receptions, 84 yards
- NE – Jakobi Meyers – 6 receptions, 68 yards

=== Standings ===
==== Division ====
AFC East
	W	L	T	PCT	DIV	CONF	PF	PA	STK
^{(2)} Buffalo Bills	13	3	0	.813	6–0	10–2	501	375	W6
Miami Dolphins	10	6	0	.625	3–3	7–5	404	338	L1
New England Patriots	7	9	0	.438	3–3	6–6	326	353	W1
New York Jets	2	14	0	.125	0–6	1–11	243	457	L1

==== Conference ====
AFC
#	Team	Division	W	L	T	PCT	DIV	CONF	SOS	SOV	STK
**Division leaders**
1	Kansas City Chiefs	West	14	2	0	.875	4–2	10–2	.465	.464	L1
2	Buffalo Bills	East	13	3	0	.813	6–0	10–2	.512	.471	W6
3	Pittsburgh Steelers	North	12	4	0	.750	4–2	9–3	.475	.448	L1
4 (Note: Tennessee finished ahead of Indianapolis in the AFC South based on division record.)	Tennessee Titans	South	11	5	0	.688	5–1	8–4	.475	.398	W1
**Wild cards**
5 (Note: Baltimore claimed the No. 5 seed over Indianapolis based on head-to-head victory. Division tiebreaker used to eliminate Cleveland (see below).) (Note: Baltimore claimed the No. 5 seed over Cleveland based on head-to-head sweep.)	Baltimore Ravens	North	11	5	0	.688	4–2	7–5	.494	.401	W5
6 (Note: Cleveland claimed the No. 6 seed over Indianapolis based on head-to-head victory.)	Cleveland Browns	North	11	5	0	.688	3–3	7–5	.451	.406	W1
7	Indianapolis Colts	South	11	5	0	.688	4–2	7–5	.443	.384	W1
**Did not qualify for the postseason**
8	Miami Dolphins	East	10	6	0	.625	3–3	7–5	.467	.347	L1
9	Las Vegas Raiders	West	8	8	0	.500	4–2	6–6	.539	.477	W1
10 (Note: New England finished ahead of the LA Chargers based on head-to-head victory.)	New England Patriots	East	7	9	0	.438	3–3	6–6	.527	.429	W1
11	Los Angeles Chargers	West	7	9	0	.438	3–3	6–6	.482	.344	W4
12	Denver Broncos	West	5	11	0	.313	1–5	4–8	.566	.388	L3
13	Cincinnati Bengals	North	4	11	1	.281	1–5	4–8	.529	.438	L1
14	Houston Texans	South	4	12	0	.250	2–4	3–9	.541	.219	L5
15	New York Jets	East	2	14	0	.125	0–6	1–11	.594	.656	L1
16	Jacksonville Jaguars	South	1	15	0	.063	1–5	1–11	.549	.688	L15
**Tiebreakers** (Note: When breaking ties for three or more teams under the NFL's rules, they are first broken within divisions, then comparing only the highest ranked remaining team from each division.)
