= William D. Allen =

American football and basketball coach (1886–1979)

Biographical details
- Born: February 13, 1886; Grandview, Greene County, Tennessee, U.S.
- Died: December 27, 1979 (aged 93); Minot, North Dakota, U.S.

Coaching career (HC unless noted)

Football
- 1936–1945: Minot State

Basketball
- 1937–1946: Minot State

Head coaching record
- Overall: 21–28–8 (football); 88–27 (basketball)

William Drury "Doc" Allen (February 13, 1886 – December 27, 1979) was an American football and basketball coach. He served as the head football coach at Minot State Teacher's College—now known as Minot State University—in Minot, North Dakota from 1936 to 1945, compiling a record of 21–28–8. Allen was also the head basketball coach at Minot State from 1937 to 1946, tallying mark of 88–27.

== Head coaching record ==
=== Football ===
Year	Team	Overall	Conference	Standing	Bowl/playoffs
Minot State Beavers (North Dakota Intercollegiate Conference) (1936–1945)
1936	Minot State	5–3	5–1	2nd	
1937	Minot State	4–3–1	4–1–1	2nd	
1938	Minot State	1–3–2	1–2–2	T–5th	
1939	Minot State	0–6–2	0–4–2	T–7th	
1940	Minot State	2–4–1	2–4	6th	
1941	Minot State	1–5	1–4	7th	
1942	Minot State	2–1	2–1	3rd	
1943	Minot State	1–2			
1944	Minot State	1–1–2			
1945	Minot State	4–0			
Minot State:		21–28–8			
Total:		21–28–8			
