= 1953 Northern State Wolves football team =

American college football season

1953 Northern State Wolves football

SDIC champion
- Conference: South Dakota Intercollegiate Conference
- Record: 8–0 (6–0 SDIC)
- Head coach: Clark Swisher (8th season)

1953 South Dakota Intercollegiate Conference football standings
	Conf.					Overall
Team	W		L		T	W		L		T
Northern State $	6	–	0	–	0	8	–	0	–	0
Huron	5	–	2	–	0	6	–	3	–	0
Southern State (SD)	4	–	2	–	0	6	–	2	–	0
South Dakota Mines	4	–	2	–	0	4	–	4	–	1
Dakota Wesleyan	3	–	3	–	0	5	–	3	–	0
Yankton	3	–	4	–	0	3	–	5	–	0
Sioux Falls	1	–	4	–	0	2	–	5	–	0
Black Hills	1	–	5	–	0	2	–	7	–	0
General Beadle	0	–	5	–	0	0	–	6	–	0
$ – Conference champion

The 1953 Northern State Wolves football team was an American football team that represented Northern State Teachers College (now known as Northern State University) as a member of the South Dakota Intercollegiate Conference (SDIC) during the 1953 college football season. In their ninth year under head coach Clark Swisher, the Wolves compiled a perfect 8–0 record (6–0 in conference games), won the SDIC championship, and outscored opponents by a total of 338 to 79.

A postseason game was proposed with North Central Conference champion South Dakota State to determine the state championship, but it did not occur.

The team played its home games in Aberdeen, South Dakota.

== Schedule ==
Date	Opponent	Site	Result	Attendance	Source
September 26	at Minot State*	Minot, ND	W 44–6		
October 3	Huron	Aberdeen, SD	W 37–6		
October 10	South Dakota Mines	Aberdeen, SD	W 34–19		
October 17	Southern State	Aberdeen, SD	W 32–9		
October 24	Yankton	Aberdeen, SD	W 58–26		
October 31	at Dakota Wesleyan	Kernel Stadium; Mitchell, SD	W 39–7		
November 7	at Black Hills	Deadwood, SD	W 48–6		
November 11	Valley City*	Aberdeen, SD	W 46–0	2,000	
*Non-conference game
