= Bill Richter =

American sports coach and college president (1916–2007)

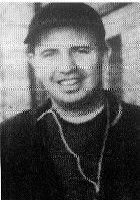

Biographical details
- Born: August 15, 1916; Dickinson, North Dakota, U.S.
- Died: November 20, 2007 (aged 91); Sublimity, Oregon, U.S.
- Education: Minot State (BA), University of Montana (MA), University of North Dakota (Ed.D)

Coaching career (HC unless noted)

Football
- 1939–?: Carter County HS (MT)
- 1946: Minot State
- 1947: Boise (assistant)
- 1948–1950: Valley City State
- 1952–1953: Valley City State

Basketball
- 1946–1947: Minot State
- 1947–1948: Boise

Baseball
- 1952–1954: Valley City State

Head coaching record
- Overall: 38–10–1 (college football); 14–9 (college basketball)

Accomplishments and honors

Championships
- Football; 5 NDIC (1946, 1949, 1950, 1952–1953)

William Blanchard Richter (August 15, 1916 – November 20, 2007) was an American football, basketball, and baseball coach as well as a college president. During the 1947–48 season, he served as the head men's basketball coach at Boise State University.

Prior to his single season at Boise, Richter served as the head football coach (1946), head men's basketball coach (1946–1947), and athletic director at this alma mater, Minot State University.

Richter served as the head football coach at Valley City State University in Valley City, North Dakota, from 1948 to 1950 and from 1952 to 1953. In 1975, he was named the college president of Ohlone College in Fremont, California, where he remained until his retirement in 1979.

== Head coaching record ==
=== College football ===
Year	Team	Overall	Conference	Standing	Bowl/playoffs
Minot State (North Dakota Intercollegiate Conference) (1946)
1946	Minot State	6–0–1	3–0–1	1st	
Minot State:		6–0–1	3–0–1		
Valley City State Vikings (North Dakota Intercollegiate Conference) (1948–1950)
1948	Valley City State	5–3	4–2	3rd	
1949	Valley City State	8–1	6–0	1st	
1950	Valley City State	7–1	5–0	1st	
Valley City State Vikings (North Dakota Intercollegiate Conference) (1952–1953)
1952	Valley City State	5–3	5–1	T–1st	
1953	Valley City State	7–2	6–0	1st	
Valley City State:		32–10	26–3		
Total:		38–10–1			
National championship Conference title Conference division title or championship game berth
