= Ted Keck =

American football and baseball coach (1919–2010)

Biographical details
- Born: August 4, 1919; Washburn, North Dakota, U.S.
- Died: November 11, 2010 (aged 91); Georgetown, Texas, U.S.

Playing career

Football
- 1937–1940: Minot State

Coaching career (HC unless noted)

Football
- 1954–1956: Minot State

Baseball
- 1957–1963: Minot State

Wrestling
- 1957–1960: Minot State

Administrative career (AD unless noted)
- 1949–1963: Minot State
- 1963–1970: Northern Arizona

Head coaching record
- Overall: 13–6–1 (football); 82–29 (baseball); 17–7 (wrestling)

Accomplishments and honors

Championships
- Football; 1 NDIC (1954)

Ted F. Keck (August 4, 1919 – November 11, 2010) was an American football player and coach. He served as the head football coach (1954–1956) and baseball coach (1957–1963) at Minot State University before serving as the athletic director at Northern Arizona University in Flagstaff, Arizona, from 1963 to 1970.

== Head coaching record ==
=== Football ===
Year	Team	Overall	Conference	Standing	Bowl/playoffs
Minot State Beavers (North Dakota Intercollegiate Conference) (1954–1956)
1954	Minot State	6–1	6–0	1st	
1955	Minot State	4–2	4–2	T–3rd	
1956	Minot State	3–3–1	3–2–1	T–4th	
Minot State:		13–6–1	13–4–1		
Total:		13–6–1			
National championship Conference title Conference division title or championship game berth
