= Herb Parker =

American football coach and educator

Biographical details
- Born: January 18, 1921; Jamestown, North Dakota, U.S.
- Died: October 7, 2007 (aged 86); Minot, North Dakota, U.S.

Playing career

Basketball
- 1939–1942: Jamestown

Coaching career (HC unless noted)

Football
- 1947–1949: Minot State
- 1951: Minot State

Basketball
- 1948–1959: Minot State

Administrative career (AD unless noted)
- 1947–1959: Minot State
- 1974–1976: Minot State

Head coaching record
- Overall: 21–6–1 (football); 175–85 (basketball)

Accomplishments and honors

Championships
- Football; 1 NDIC (1958)

Herbert Mitchell Parker (January 18, 1921 – October 7, 2007) was an American educator, football and basketball coach, and athletics administrator. He served as the head football coach at Minot State Teacher's College—now known as Minot State University—from 1947 to 1949 and in 1951, compiling a record of 21–6–1. Parker was also the athletic director at Minot State from 1947 to 1959 and 1974 to 1976.

== Early life ==
Parker was born in Jamestown, North Dakota and raised and educated in Nekoma. Parker was an all-conference athlete and captain of the basketball team, while at Jamestown College. In 1983, Parker was inducted into the college's Athletic Hall of Fame. Parker also has been inducted into the MSU Athletic Hall of Fame and the NAIA Hall of Fame. Parker received a master's degree from the University of Northern Colorado in Greeley.

== Teaching and coaching career ==
In 1942, Parker married Marjorie Wilson in Washburn, North Dakota and moved to Dickinson. Parker taught and coached at Dickinson High School until 1947, when his family moved to Minot. Parker taught physical education and coached football, basketball and track at Minot State Teacher's College (now Minot State), where he was employed until his retirement in 1983. Parker coached future LSU coach Dale Brown at Minot State. Brown earned varsity letters in basketball, football and track every year he attended school in Minot. Parker served as athletic director for Minot State from 1947 until 1959 and from 1974 until 1976. From 1959 until his retirement, Parker also served as Dean of Men. In 1983, Minot State University named Herb Parker Stadium in his honor.

== Head coaching record ==
=== Football ===
Year	Team	Overall	Conference	Standing	Bowl/playoffs
Minot State Beavers (North Dakota Intercollegiate Conference) (1947–1949)
1947	Minot State	6–1	4–1	T–2nd	
1948	Minot State	6–1	5–0	T–1st	
1949	Minot State	5–1–1	4–1	T–2nd	
Minot State Beavers (North Dakota Intercollegiate Conference) (1951)
1951	Minot State	4–3	3–2	3rd	
Minot State:		21–6–1	16–4		
Total:		21–6–1			
National championship Conference title Conference division title or championship game berth
