= 1953 Valley City State Vikings football team =

American college football season

1953 Valley City State Vikings football
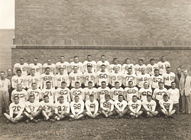

NDIC champion
- Conference: North Dakota Intercollegiate Conference
- Record: 7–2 (6–0 NDIC)
- Head coach: Bill Richter (5th season)

1953 North Dakota Intercollegiate Conference football standings
	Conf.					Overall
Team	W		L		T	W		L		T
Valley City State $	6	–	0	–	0	7	–	2	–	0
Minot State	5	–	1	–	0	6	–	2	–	0
Wahpeton Science	4	–	2	–	0	5	–	2	–	0
Mayville State	4	–	2	–	0	4	–	2	–	0
Jamestown	3	–	3	–	0	3	–	4	–	0
Bismarck JC	2	–	4	–	0	2	–	4	–	0
Dickinson State	2	–	4	–	0	2	–	5	–	0
Ellendale	1	–	5	–	0	1	–	6	–	0
Bottineau	0	–	6	–	0	0	–	6	–	0
$ – Conference champion

The 1953 Valley City State Teachers College Vikings football team represented Valley City State Teachers College—now known as Valley City State University—as a member of the North Dakota Intercollegiate Conference (NDIC) during the 1953 college football season. Led by Bill Richter in his fifth and final season as head coach, the Vikings compiled an overall record of 7–2 overall with a mark of 6–0 in conference play, winning the NDIC title. .

The Vikings defeated Minot State, Bismarck JC, Wahpeton Science, Jamestown, Mayville State, Bottineau, and Bemidji State. Their two losses came against Moorhead State and Northern State.

Four players earned All-Conference honors: Gus Lybeck, Frank Vetter, Leo Longnecker and Aloys Dosch.

== Schedule ==
Date	Opponent	Site	Result	Attendance	Source
September 18	at Minot State	Minot, ND	W 12–2		
September 25	Bismarck JC	Valley City, ND	W 44–6		
October 3	Wahpeton Science	Valley City, ND	W 13–0		
October 9	at Jamestown	Jamestown, ND (rivaly)	W 33–0		
October 17	at Mayville State	Mayville, ND (rivaly)	W 39–6		
October 23	Bottineau	Valley City, ND	W 68–7		
October 30	Bemidji State*	Valley City, ND	W 26–6		
November 7	at Moorhead State*	Moorhead, MN	L 2–33		
November 11	at Northern State*	Aberdeen, SD	L 0–46	2,000	
*Non-conference game

== Coaching staff ==
- Bill Richter: head coach

== Award and honors ==
All-Conference selections: Gus Lybeck, Frank Vetter, Leo Longnecker, Aloys Dosch.
