= Ken Becker =

American sports coach (1932–2007)

Biographical details
- Born: November 15, 1932; New Salem, North Dakota, U.S.
- Died: April 26, 2007 (aged 74); Phoenix, Arizona, U.S.

Playing career

Football
- c. 1950: Jamestown

Basketball
- c. 1950: Jamestown

Baseball
- c. 1950: Jamestown

Track and field
- c. 1950: Jamestown
- Position: Halfback

Coaching career (HC unless noted)

Football
- 1954: Wilton HS (ND)
- 1955–1956: Underwood HS (ND) (assistant)
- 1957–1964: Underwood HS (ND)
- 1965: Harvey HS (ND)
- 1969–1974: Minot State

Basketball
- 1954–1955: Wilton HS (ND)
- 1976–1985: Minot State

Baseball
- 1967–1970: Minot State
- 1977–1984: Minot State

Head coaching record
- Overall: 39–12 (college football); 96–102 (college basketball); 192–154–2 (college baseball)
- Tournaments: Football; 0–1 (NAIA D-II playoffs)

Accomplishments and honors

Championships
- Football; 5 NDCAC (1970–1974) Basketball; 3 NDCAC (1977, 1979, 1981) Baseball; 3 NDCAC (1966–1968) Golf; 2 NDCAC (1983–1984)

Kenneth O. Becker (November 15, 1932 – April 26, 2007) was an American sports coach. He coached American football, basketball, baseball, and golf at Minot State College—now known as Minot State University—in Minot, North Dakota. He served as the head football coach at Minot from 1969 to 1974, leading the Minot State Beavers football program to a record of 39–12 in six seasons and five consecutive North Dakota College Athletic Conference (NDCAC) titles, from 1970 to 1974. Becker was also the head basketball coach at Minot State from 1976 to 1985, tallying a mark of 96–102, and served two stints as the school's head baseball coach, from 1967 to 1970 and 1977 to 1984, amassing a record of 192–154–2.

Becker was born on November 15, 1932, in New Salem, North Dakota to Otto and Gladys Becker. He attended New Salem High School before going to Jamestown College—now known as the University of Jamestown—in Jamestown, North Dakota, where he played football, basketball, and baseball, and ran track. Backer graduated from Jamestown in 1954, and began his coaching career later that year at Wilton High School in Wilton, North Dakota. He then spent two years as an assistant coach at Underwood High School in Underwood, North Dakota under Bill Zwarych before succeeding him as head coach in 1957.

Becker died on April 26, 2007, at a hospital in Phoenix, Arizona.

== Head coaching record ==
=== College football ===
Year	Team	Overall	Conference	Standing	Bowl/playoffs	NAIA DII^{#}
Minot State Beavers (North Dakota College Athletic Conference) (1969–1974)
1969	Minot State	5–3	3–2	4th		
1970	Minot State	8–1	5–0	1st	L NAIA Division II Semifinal	5
1971	Minot State	7–1	4–1	T–1st		8
1972	Minot State	6–3	4–1	T–1st		
1973	Minot State	6–3	5–0	1st		
1974	Minot State	7–1	5–0	1st		14
Minot State:		39–12	26–4			
Total:		39–12				
National championship Conference title Conference division title or championship game berth
^{#}Rankings from final NAIA Division II poll.
