= 1949 Valley City State Vikings football team =

American college football season

1949 Valley City State Vikings football
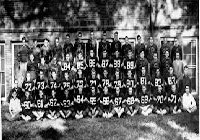

NDIC champion
- Conference: North Dakota Intercollegiate Conference
- Record: 8–1 (6–0 NDIC)
- Head coach: Bill Richter (2nd season)
- Home stadium: Hanna Field

1949 North Dakota Intercollegiate Conference football standings
	Conf.					Overall
Team	W		L		T	W		L		T
Valley City State $	5	–	0	–	0	8	–	1	–	0
Minot State	4	–	1	–	0	5	–	1	–	1
Ellendale	4	–	1	–	0	4	–	2	–	0
Dickinson State	3	–	2	–	0	5	–	3	–	0
Jamestown	3	–	2	–	0	3	–	5	–	0
Wahpeton Science	3	–	3	–	0	3	–	4	–	1
Mayville State	2	–	5	–	0	2	–	7	–	0
Bottineau	1	–	5	–	0	1	–	5	–	1
Bismarck JC	0	–	6	–	0	0	–	6	–	0
$ – Conference champion

The 1949 Valley City State Teachers College Vikings football team represented Valley City State Teachers College—now known as Valley City State University—as a member of the North Dakota Intercollegiate Conference (NDIC) during the 1949 college football season. Led by head coach Bill Richter, the Vikings completed the regular season with a perfect 8–0 record and went 6–0 in NDIC play, claiming the conference championship. The team outscored its opponents 235–126 over the course of the season, and advanced to a postseason pick-up game against St. Ambrose, where the Vikings suffered their only loss to finish 8–1 overall.

Richter's 1949 squad is recognized as one of the early standard-bearers in Valley City State Vikings football history. The Vikings opened the year with a shutout of Huron and followed with decisive victories over Wahpeton Science, Jamestown, and Black Hills. They then defeated NDIC rivals Dickinson State, Mayville State and Ellendale, and capped the unbeaten regular season by edging Northern State in a one-point road win.

The 1949 team was later inducted into the Viking Hall of Fame in recognition of its perfect regular season and conference title.

== Schedule ==
Date	Time	Opponent	Site	Result	Attendance	Source
September 16		Huron*	Valley City, ND	W 27–0		
September 23		at Wahpeton Science	Wahpeton, ND	W 23–6		
September 29		Jamestown	Valley City, ND (rivaly)	W 45–0		
October 8		at Black Hills*	Spearfish, SD	W 21–12		
October 15	2:00 p.m.	at Dickinson State	Dickinson, ND (rivaly)	W 21–13		
October 22		Mayville State	Valley City, ND (rivaly)	W 39–6		
October 29		Ellendale	Valley City, ND	W 33–12		
November 4		at Northern State*	Aberdeen, SD	W 20–19		
November 12	2:00 p.m.	at St. Ambrose*	Davenport Municipal Stadium; Davenport, IA	L 6–58	3,500	
*Non-conference game; All times are in Central time

== Personnel ==
=== Coaching staff ===
- Bill Richter: head coach

=== Roster ===
Team members recognized with the 1949 Viking Hall of Fame induction include Alton Urness, Leo Stumpf, Eugene Burns, Chuck Taylor, Marven Carlson, Larry Stenshoel, John Beitia, Kenny Koehn, Chuck Johnson, Ralph Undem, Francis Dahl, Leonard Ratzlaff, Al Johnson, Tommy Kerns, Don Nasseth, Pete Call, Bob Lentz, Dick Starke, Bill Woods, Brad Hanna, Ernie Janisch, Norman Furuseth, Erling Dahl, Dick Myatt, Clarence Laber, James Buehler, Harry Dalos, Bill Brinker, Paul Sundstrom, David Borchert, Glenn Berg, Duane Holly, Bud Dahl, Dick Oeffner, Vince Olson, Wayne Wilkins, Jim Detar, Dean Belwas, John Sinclair, Vern Hansen, Les Martin, Dale Thorstenson, Chuck Asker, Dick Schindler, Arnold Flath, John Grim, Hugo Carlson, Jack Moore, Gary Valiere, Ridgeway Koppi, Marvin Martilla and Jim Seminary.
