= Dave Hendrickson =

American football player and coach

Biographical details
- Born: c. 1949

Playing career
- c. 1970: Valley City State

Coaching career (HC unless noted)
- 1972–1973: Minnewaukan HS (ND)
- 1974–1978: Hettinger HS (ND)
- 1979: North Dakota (assistant)
- 1980: T. F. Riggs HS (SD)
- 1981: Mayville State (assistant)
- 1982–1983: Washburn HS (ND)
- 1984: Beulah HS (ND)
- 1986–1988: Killdeer HS (ND)
- 1989: Mayville State
- 1990–1999: Minot State
- 2006–2014: Belfield / Heart River HS (ND)

Administrative career (AD unless noted)
- 2006–?: Belfield HS (ND)

Head coaching record
- Overall: 61–44 (college)
- Tournaments: 3–4 NAIA D-II playoffs

Accomplishments and honors

Championships
- 4 NDCAC (1991–1994)

Dave Hendrickson (born c. 1949) is an American former football coach. He served as the head football coach at Mayville State University in Mayville, North Dakota in 1989 and Minot State University—in Minot, North Dakota from 1990 to 1999, compiling a career college football record of 61–44.

A native of Rugby, North Dakota, Hendrickson attended Valley City State University in Valley City, North Dakota, lettering in football and baseball. He began his coaching career at Minnewaukan High School in Minnewaukan, North Dakota, where he coached football, basketball, and baseball. 1974, he was appointed head football coach at Hettinger High School in Hettinger, North Dakota.

== Head coaching record ==
=== College ===
Year	Team	Overall	Conference	Standing	Bowl/playoffs
Mayville State Comets (North Dakota College Athletic Conference) (1989)
1989	Mayville State	4–5	1–4	5th	
Mayville State:		4–5	1–4		
Minot State Beavers (North Dakota College Athletic Conference) (1990–1999)
1990	Minot State	4–5	2–3	4th	
1991	Minot State	6–4	4–1	T–1st	L NAIA Division II First Round
1992	Minot State	9–3	4–1	T–1st	L NAIA Division II Semifinal
1993	Minot State	6–4	5–0	1st	L NAIA Division II First Round
1994	Minot State	8–3	4–1	T–1st	L NAIA Division II Quarterfinal
1995	Minot State	5–4	3–3	T–3rd	
1996	Minot State	6–3	4–2	3rd	
1997	Minot State	5–4	4–2	T–2nd	
1998	Minot State	4–5	2–4	T–5th	
1999	Minot State	4–4	3–2	T–2nd	
Minot State:		57–39	35–19		
Total:		61–44			
National championship Conference title Conference division title or championship game berth
