= Clark Swisher =

American football and basketball coach (1916–2005)

Biographical details
- Born: March 27, 1916; Vermillion, South Dakota, U.S.
- Died: November 28, 2005 (aged 89); Wessington Springs, South Dakota, U.S.

Playing career

Football
- 1934–1937: South Dakota

Basketball
- 1934–1938: South Dakota

Coaching career (HC unless noted)

Football
- 1938: Wagner HS (SD)
- 1939–1940: Elk Point HS (SD)
- 1946–1955: Northern State
- 1957–1968: Northern State

Basketball
- 1946–1955: Northern State

Head coaching record
- Overall: 146–42–4 (college football); 95–88 (college basketball)
- Bowls: 1–0
- Tournaments: Football; 0–3 (NAIA playoffs)

Accomplishments and honors

Championships
- Football; 15 SDIC (1948, 1950, 1952–1955, 1957, 1960–1963, 1965–1968)

Clark Leo Swisher (March 27, 1916 – November 28, 2005) was an American football and basketball coach. He served as the head football coach at Northern State University in Aberdeen, South Dakota from 1946 and 1955 and from 1957 to 1968, compiling a record of 146–42–4. Swisher was also the head basketball coach at Northern State from 1946 to 1955, tallying a mark of 95–88. Swisher died on November 28, 2005, at a hospital in Wessington Springs, South Dakota.

== Head coaching record ==
=== College football ===
Year	Team	Overall	Conference	Standing	Bowl/playoffs
Northern State Wolves (South Dakota Intercollegiate Conference) (1946–1955)
1946	Northern State	6–2	1–0	2nd	
1947	Northern State	6–2	2–1	2nd	
1948	Northern State	7–1	5–0	1st	
1949	Northern State	1–5–2	0–2–2	9th	
1950	Northern State	5–3	4–0	1st	
1951	Northern State	4–4	3–2	4th	
1952	Northern State	6–1	4–1	1st	
1953	Northern State	8–0	6–0	1st	
1954	Northern State	6–2	6–1	T–1st	
1955	Northern State	9–1	7–0	1st	W Botany Bowl
Northern State Wolves (South Dakota Intercollegiate Conference) (1957–1968)
1957	Northern State	7–1	7–0	1st	
1958	Northern State	8–2	7–1	2nd	
1959	Northern State	5–4	5–3	4th	
1960	Northern State	8–1	5–1	T–1st	
1961	Northern State	9–1	6–0	1st	L NAIA Semifinal
1962	Northern State	9–1	6–0	1st	L NAIA Semifinal
1963	Northern State	8–1	6–0	1st	
1964	Northern State	6–3	5–1	2nd	
1965	Northern State	5–4	5–1	1st	
1966	Northern State	6–1–2	5–0–1	1st	
1967	Northern State	8–1	6–0	1st	
1968	Northern State	9–1	6–0	1st	L NAIA Semifinal
Northern State:		146–42–4	107–14–3		
Total:		146–42–4			
National championship Conference title Conference division title or championship game berth
