= Herb Parker Stadium =

Football stadium in Minot, North Dakota

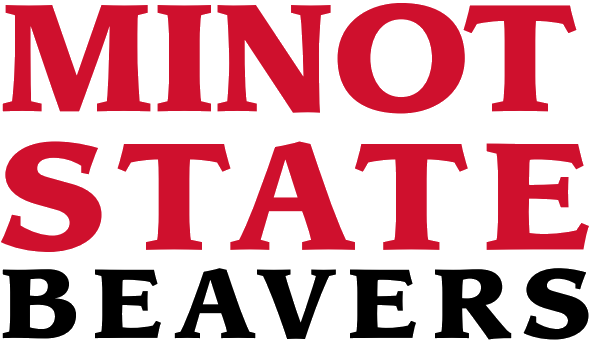

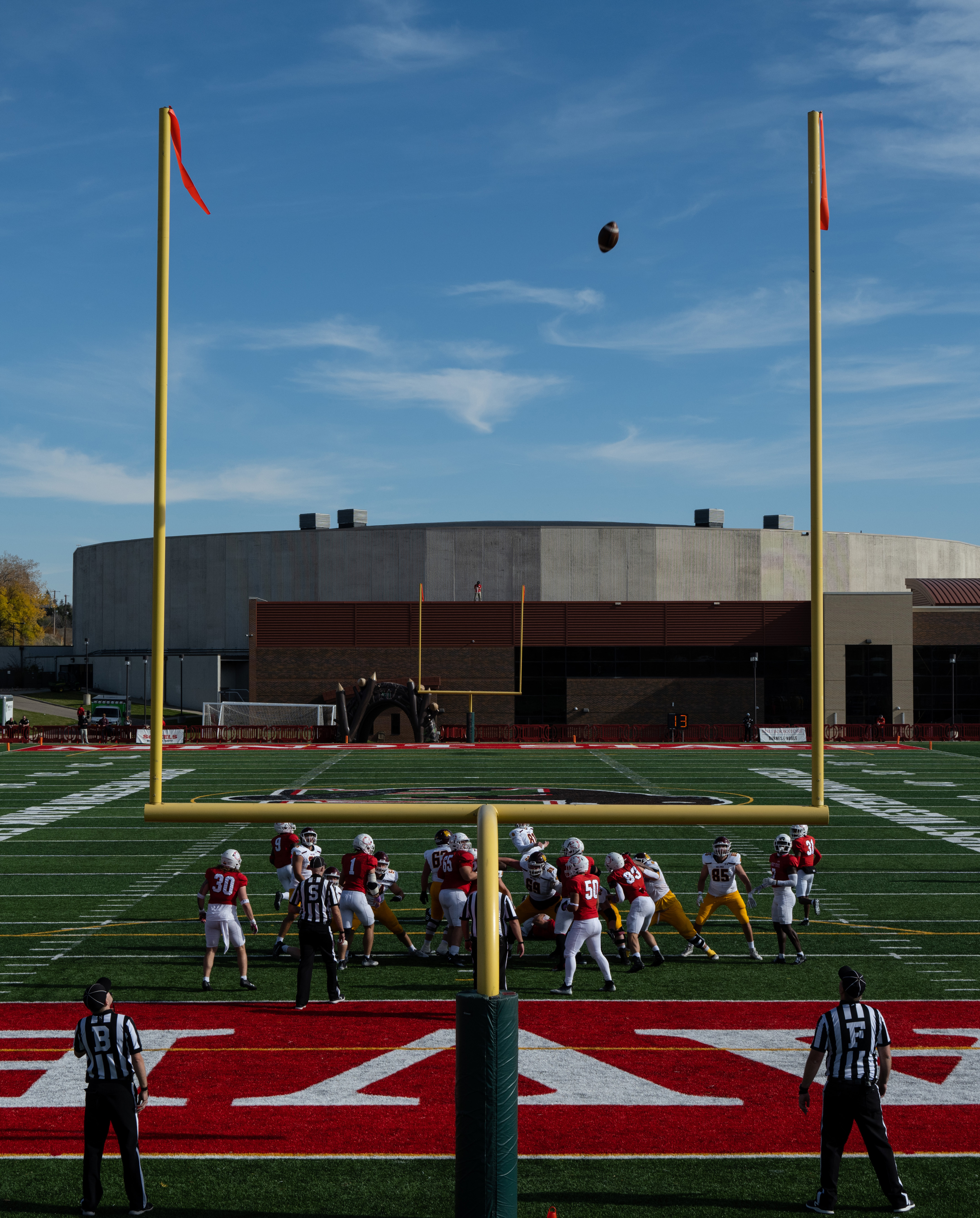
- Football game at the stadium in 2023

- Location within the United States Location within North Dakota
- Interactive map of Herb Parker Stadium
- Address: 500 University Ave W.
- Location: Minot, North Dakota, U.S.
- Coordinates: 48°14′54″N 101°18′10″W
- Elevation: 1,600 feet (490 m) AMSL
- Owner: Minot State University
- Capacity: 4,500
- Type: Stadium
- Surface: Artificial turf
- Current use: American football
- Public transit: Minot City Transit

Tenant
- Minot State Beavers (NCAA)

Website
- minotstateu.edu/herb_parker

Herb Parker Stadium is an outdoor 4,500-seat multi-purpose stadium in the north central United States, located on the campus of Minot State University in Minot, North Dakota. The venue is home to the MSU Beavers football and women's soccer teams. It was named in 1983 for Herb Parker, the long-time coach and athletic director.

The Beavers are members of the Northern Sun Intercollegiate Conference (NSIC) in NCAA Division II. Prior to 2012, they belonged to the Dakota Athletic Conference in the National Association of Intercollegiate Athletics (NAIA).

The stadium is named after Herb Parker, football and basketball coach, and athletics administrator. He served as the head football coach at MSU from 1947 to 1949 and in 1951, compiling a record of 21–6–1. Parker was also the college's athletic director from 1947 to 1959 and 1974 to 1976.

The artificial turf field runs east-west at an approximate elevation of 1,600 feet (490 m) above sea level; the grandstand and press box are along the north sideline, which results in challenging visuals for autumn day games, looking into the sun.

The stadium is undergoing a multiple phase improvement project, which includes construction of a press box, concessions, ticketing office, a lobby, merchandising area, and a video scoreboard.
