= David Quessenberry =

American football player (born 1990)

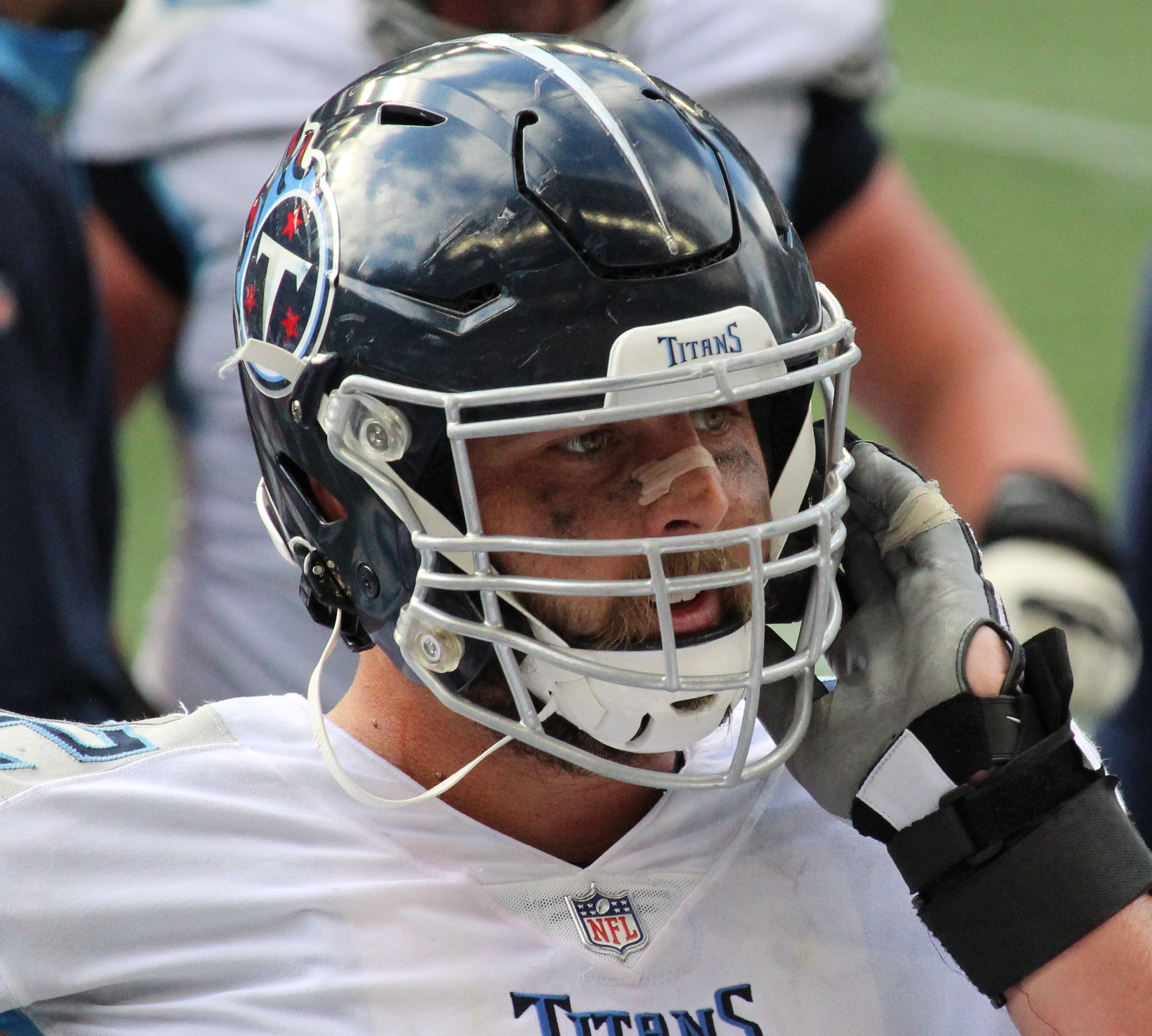
- Quessenberry with the Tennessee Titans in 2021

No. 68 – Los Angeles Rams
- Position: Offensive tackle
- Roster status: Active

Personal information
- Born: August 24, 1990 (age 36); La Jolla, California, U.S
- Listed height: 6 ft 5 in (1.96 m)
- Listed weight: 310 lb (141 kg)

Career information
- High school: La Costa Canyon (Carlsbad, California)
- College: San José State (2008–2012)
- NFL draft: 2013: 6th round, 176th overall pick

Career history
- Houston Texans (2013–2017); Tennessee Titans (2018–2021); Buffalo Bills (2022); Minnesota Vikings (2023–2024); Los Angeles Rams (2025–present)

Awards and highlights
- George Halas Award (2017); First-team All-WAC (2012); Second-team All-WAC (2011)

Career NFL statistics as of Week 5, 2026
- Games played: 102
- Games started: 30
- Stats at Pro Football Reference

David Lee Quessenberry Jr. (born August 24, 1990) is an American professional football offensive tackle for the Los Angeles Rams of the National Football League (NFL). He played college football for the San José State Spartans and was selected by the Houston Texans in the sixth round of the 2013 NFL draft. He has also played for the Tennessee Titans, Buffalo Bills, and Minnesota Vikings.

== Early life ==
Born in the La Jolla community of San Diego, Quessenberry attended La Costa Canyon High School in Carlsbad, California, and lettered in football and lacrosse. Quessenberry played tight end at La Costa Canyon. His father played college football at the United States Naval Academy and served in the United States Navy from 1980 to 2010.

== College career ==
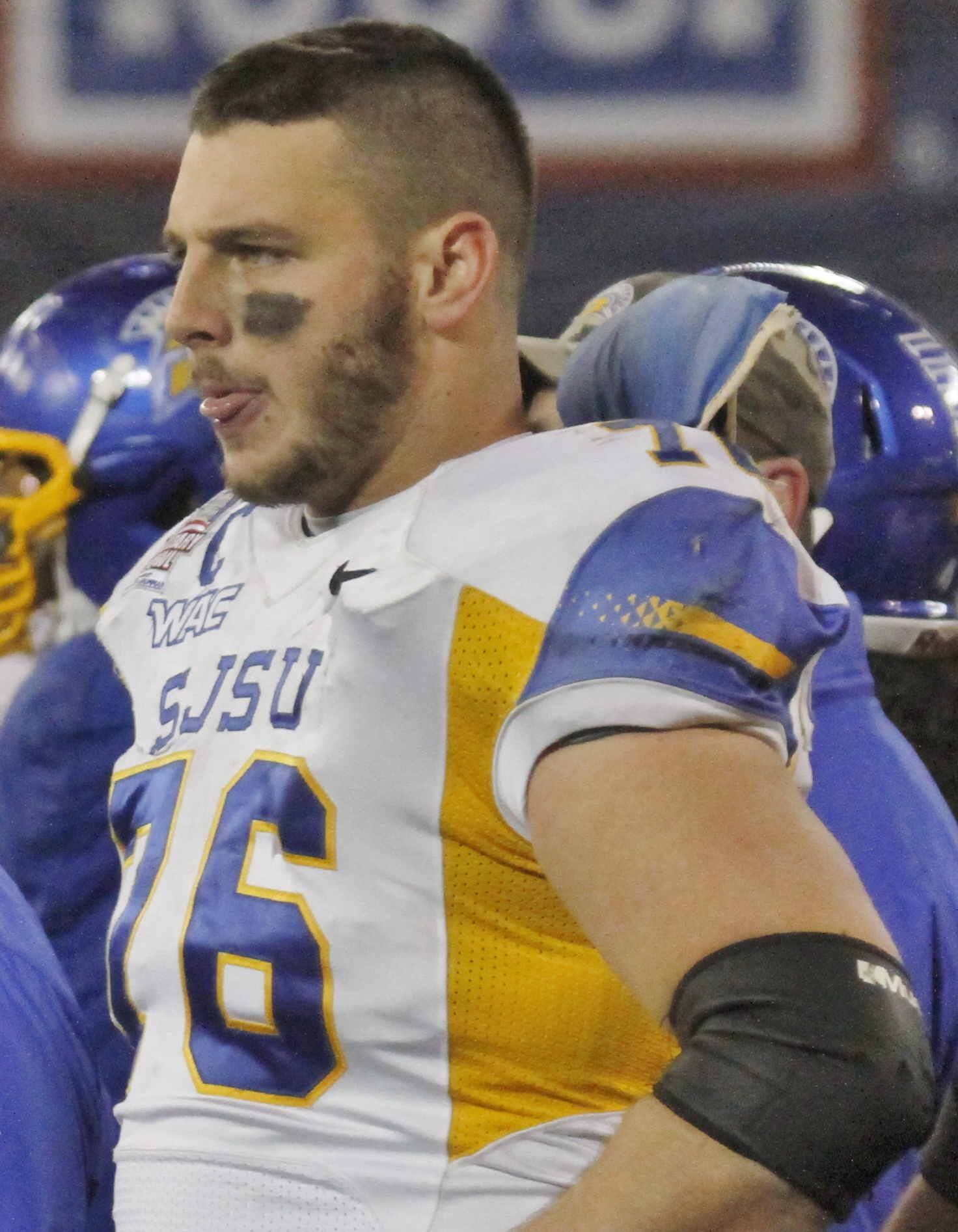
Quessenberry at the 2012 Military Bowl

Having no scholarship offers out of high school, Quessenberry met a San Jose State assistant coach who was recruiting a teammate. Quessenberry later walked-on to the Spartans football team at San Jose State University in 2008 and redshirted that year to bulk up from his 235-pound weight. He would go on to play in 50 games for the Spartans with 38 starts. As a freshman in 2009 under coach Dick Tomey, Quessenberry played in all 12 games mostly on special teams and was a reserve at offensive tackle and tight end.

Quessenberry first earned an athletic scholarship the summer before sophomore season of 2010. In a 1–12 season under new coach Mike MacIntyre, Quessenberry started in all 13 games at left tackle and played mostly as a punt protector and extra point lineman. As a junior in 2011, Quessenberry again started all 12 games of the season, and San Jose State football improved to 5–7. Quessenberry earned second-team All-Western Athletic Conference (WAC) honors.

In his senior season, an 11–2 season in 2012 that included a 2012 Military Bowl victory, Quessenberry became team captain and was a Burlsworth Trophy finalist for best non-scholarship NCAA FBS player. He was also on the Lombardi Award watch list. After starting 27 straight games dating back to 2009, Quessenberry sat out the September 15 game due to an ankle injury suffered in the first play of the September 8 game. On September 29, Quessenberry played in a game against Navy, a team with younger brother Paul as an offensive lineman. Selected for the 2013 Senior Bowl, Quessenberry became the first San Jose State offensive lineman to play in a Senior Bowl. He was a first-team all-WAC selection. In December 2012, Quessenberry graduated from San Jose State with a B.A. in history.

== Professional career ==
Pre-draft measurables
Height	Weight	Arm length	Hand span	Wingspan	40-yard dash	10-yard split	20-yard split	20-yard shuttle	Three-cone drill	Vertical jump	Broad jump	Bench press
6 ft 4 7/8 in (1.95 m)	302 lb (137 kg)	34 3/8 in (0.87 m)	10 5/8 in (0.27 m)	6 ft 9 in (2.06 m)	5.08 s	1.73 s	2.92 s	4.45 s	7.49 s	29.5 in (0.75 m)	9 ft 4 in (2.84 m)	25 reps
All values from NFL Scouting Combine

=== Houston Texans ===
The Houston Texans selected Quessenberry in the sixth round with the 176th overall pick in the 2013 NFL draft.

On September 10, 2013, the Texans placed Quessenberry on injured reserve after he injured a foot during practice, a season-ending injury.

On June 10, 2014, the Texans announced Quessenberry felt fatigue and had persistent cough. After seeking a medical evaluation, he was diagnosed with Lymphoma. As a result, the Texans put him on the Non-Football Illness designation. He was waived by the Texans with a non-football injury designation in May 2016. He cleared waivers and was placed on the team's non-football injury list.

After completing his cancer treatment, Quessenberry returned to practice with the Texans at the start of OTAs on May 23, 2017. On September 2, 2017, he was waived by the Texans and was signed to the practice squad the next day. He was promoted to the active roster on December 19, 2017. Quessenberry made his NFL debut against the Pittsburgh Steelers on December 25, 2017.

On September 1, 2018, Quessenberry was waived by the Texans.

=== Tennessee Titans ===
On September 11, 2018, Quessenberry was signed to the Tennessee Titans' practice squad. He signed a reserve/future contract with the Titans on December 31, 2018. On September 15, 2019, in a 19-17 Week 2 loss to the Indianapolis Colts, Quessenberry caught his first receiving touchdown from a pass by Marcus Mariota. On October 7, 2019, Quessenberry was released by the Titans and re-signed to the practice squad. He signed a reserve/future contract with the Titans on January 20, 2020.

On September 5, 2020, Quessenberry was waived by the Titans and signed to the practice squad the next day. He was elevated to the active roster on October 13 and 24 for the team's weeks 5 and 7 games against the Buffalo Bills and Pittsburgh Steelers, and reverted to the practice squad after each game. He was promoted to the active roster on October 27, 2020.

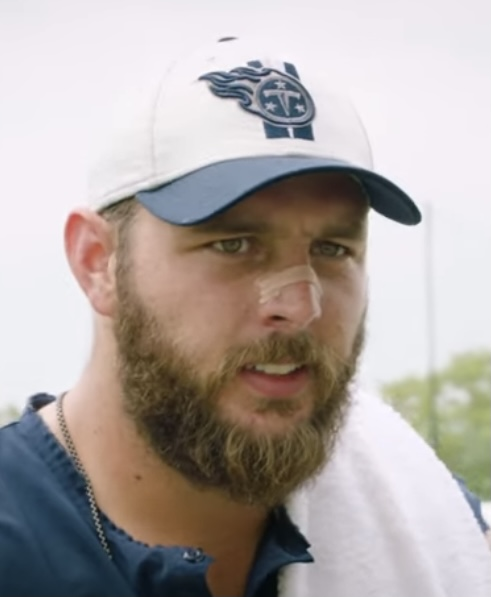
Quessenberry with the Titans in 2021

Quessenberry was named the Titans starting right tackle in 2021, and started every game.

=== Buffalo Bills ===
On April 21, 2022, Quessenberry signed with the Buffalo Bills on a one-year deal, appearing in 16 games with three starts. On March 27, 2023, Quessenberry re-signed with the Bills on a one-year deal. He was released on August 29.

=== Minnesota Vikings ===
On August 30, 2023, Quessenberry signed with the Minnesota Vikings, appearing in 16 games with four starts. He re-signed with the team on March 11, 2024, and appeared in all 17 games during the regular season.

=== Los Angeles Rams ===
On May 29, 2025, Quessenberry was signed by the Los Angeles Rams to a one-year contract. After playing 13 games as a backup, he signed a one-year extension with Los Angeles on February 18, 2026.

== Personal life ==
In June 2014, Quessenberry was diagnosed with Non-Hodgkin's lymphoma after experiencing fatigue and persistent cough. On February 25, 2015, his cancer went into remission after completing radiation treatment, then on April 13, 2017, he officially completed his cancer treatment. On June 12, 2017, Quessenberry won the 2017 George Halas Award. The award is given to the "player, coach or staff member who overcomes the most adversity to succeed". His brother Scott Quessenberry was the 155th overall pick in the fifth round of the 2018 NFL draft by the Los Angeles Chargers. Another brother, Paul Quessenberry, is a former tight end. Quessenberry hosts an annual golf tournament at different golf destinations all over the world (FIMA Golf Tournament).
