= Scott Quessenberry =

American football player (born 1995)

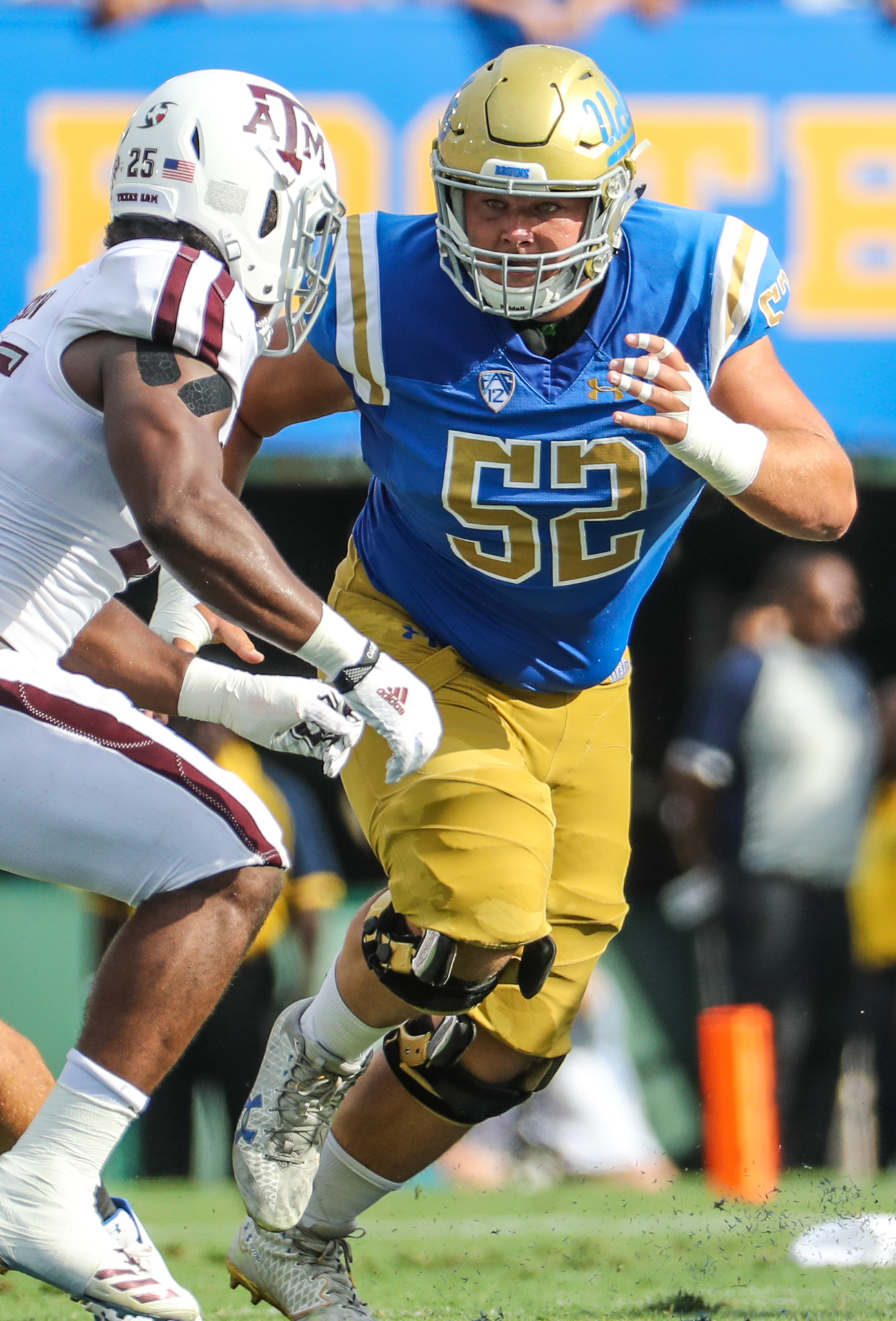
- Quessenberry with the UCLA Bruins in 2017

Profile
- Position: Guard

Personal information
- Born: March 23, 1995 (age 31); Carlsbad, California, U.S.
- Listed height: 6 ft 3 in (1.91 m)
- Listed weight: 310 lb (141 kg)

Career information
- High school: La Costa Canyon (Carlsbad)
- College: UCLA (2013–2017)
- NFL draft: 2018: 5th round, 155th overall pick

Career history
- Los Angeles Chargers (2018–2021); Houston Texans (2022–2024)

Awards and highlights
- First-team All-Pac-12 (2016)

Career NFL statistics as of 2024
- Games played: 79
- Games started: 26
- Stats at Pro Football Reference

Scott Walker Quessenberry (born March 23, 1995) is an American professional football guard. He played college football for the UCLA Bruins.

== Professional career ==
Pre-draft measurables
Height	Weight	Arm length	Hand span	40-yard dash	10-yard split	20-yard split	20-yard shuttle	Three-cone drill	Vertical jump	Broad jump	Bench press
6 ft 3 5/8 in (1.92 m)	310 lb (141 kg)	31 3/4 in (0.81 m)	9 3/4 in (0.25 m)	5.09 s	1.76 s	2.94 s	4.69 s	7.50 s	33.5 in (0.85 m)	9 ft 3 in (2.82 m)	25 reps
All values from NFL Combine

=== Los Angeles Chargers ===
Quessenberry was selected by the Los Angeles Chargers in the fifth round (155th overall) of the 2018 NFL draft by the Chargers.

=== Houston Texans ===
On March 23, 2022, Quessenberry signed with the Houston Texans. He was named the starting center in Week 2, and started the remainder of the season.

On March 13, 2023, Quessenberry re-signed with the Texans. On August 3, it was announced that Quessenberry had suffered a torn ACL and MCL in practice and would miss the entire 2023 season. He was placed on injured reserve the next day.

On September 18, 2024, Quessenberry was signed to the Texans practice squad.

== Personal life ==
Quessenberry is the younger brother of Los Angeles Rams offensive tackle David Quessenberry and Paul Quessenberry, a tight end that's currently a free agent that last played for the Texans.
