= Paul Quessenberry =

American football player (born 1992)

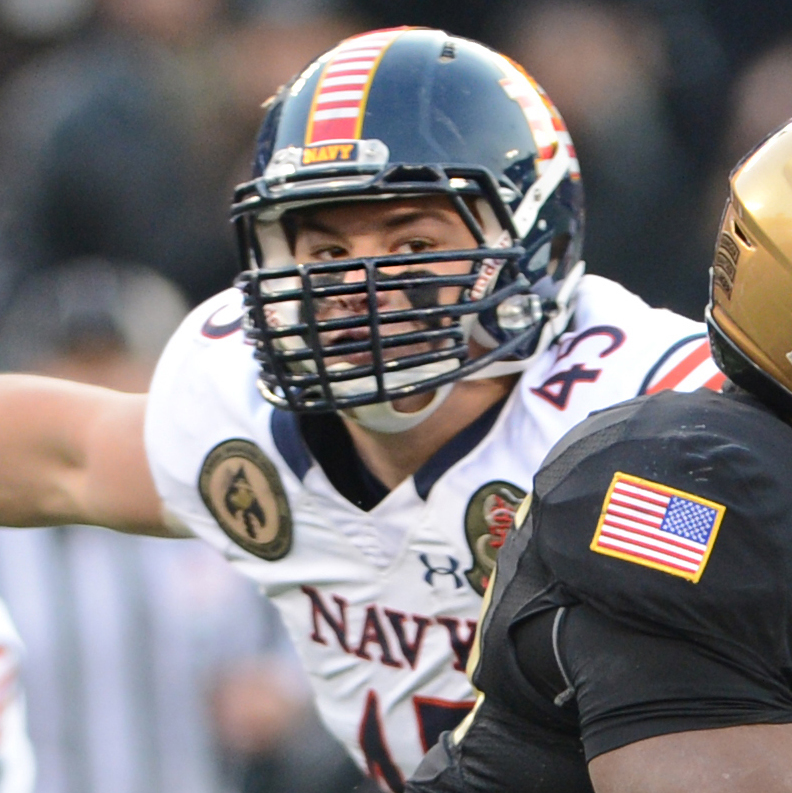
- Quessenberry with Navy in 2014

No. 45
- Position: Tight end

Personal information
- Born: January 8, 1992 (age 34); La Jolla, California, U.S.
- Listed height: 6 ft 2 in (1.88 m)
- Listed weight: 251 lb (114 kg)

Career information
- High school: La Costa Canyon (Carlsbad, California)
- College: Navy (2011–2014)
- NFL draft: 2015: undrafted

Career history
- New England Patriots (2020)*; Houston Texans (2021–2022)
- * Offseason or practice squad member only

Career NFL statistics
- Games played: 1
- Stats at Pro Football Reference

Paul Quessenberry (born January 8, 1992) is an American former professional football player who was a tight end in the National Football League (NFL). He played college football for the Navy Midshipmen.

== Career ==
=== Military ===
After earning a Bachelor of Science degree in general science from the United States Naval Academy, Quessenberry served for five years as a rifle platoon and weapons platoon commander in the United States Marine Corps. He also served as deputy director of the 1st Marine Division school.

=== New England Patriots ===
Pre-draft measurables
Height	Weight	Arm length	Hand span	40-yard dash	10-yard split	20-yard split	20-yard shuttle	Three-cone drill	Vertical jump	Broad jump	Bench press
6 ft 1 1/2 in (1.87 m)	239 lb (108 kg)	30 7/8 in (0.78 m)	8 7/8 in (0.23 m)	4.82 s	1.72 s	2.72 s	4.52 s	7.58 s	29.5 in (0.75 m)	9 ft 7 in (2.92 m)	24 reps
All values from Pro Day

Quessenberry signed with the New England Patriots on August 22, 2020, after serving five years in the Marine Corps. He was released on September 4, but was re-signed to New England's practice squad two days later. Quessenberry was released by the Patriots on September 9.

=== Houston Texans ===
Quessenberry signed with the Houston Texans on February 8, 2021, to a one-year contract. He was waived by the Texans on August 31. Quessenberry was later signed to the practice squad. He made his NFL debut in Week 16 against the Los Angeles Chargers, appearing on 18 snaps in the 41–29 win. He signed a reserve/future contract with the Texans on January 11, 2022.

On August 30, 2022, Quessenberry was waived by the Texans and re-signed to the practice squad. He was released on September 7.

On February 8, 2025, Quessenberry announced his retirement from professional football.

== Personal life ==
Quessenberry's brothers both play in the NFL. His younger brother, Scott Quessenberry, was the 155th overall pick in the fifth round of the 2018 NFL draft by the Los Angeles Chargers. His older brother, David Quessenberry, was selected in the sixth round as the 176th overall pick in the 2013 NFL draft by the Houston Texans.
