= Dalton Keene =

American football player (born 1999)

Profile
- Position: Tight end

Personal information
- Born: April 14, 1999 (age 27); St. Louis, Missouri, U.S.
- Listed height: 6 ft 4 in (1.93 m)
- Listed weight: 251 lb (114 kg)

Career information
- High school: Chatfield (Littleton, Colorado)
- College: Virginia Tech (2017–2019)
- NFL draft: 2020: 3rd round, 101st overall pick

Career history
- New England Patriots (2020–2021); Philadelphia Eagles (2022)*; Denver Broncos (2022)*; Philadelphia Eagles (2023)*; Houston Texans (2023–2025)
- * Offseason or practice squad member only

Career NFL statistics as of 2024
- Receptions: 3
- Receiving yards: 16
- Stats at Pro Football Reference

Dalton Keene (born April 14, 1999) is an American professional football tight end. He played college football for the Virginia Tech Hokies.

== Early life ==
Keene grew up in Littleton, Colorado and attended Chatfield High School, where he played middle linebacker and running back on the football team and also ran track. He was named first-team All-State as a senior after rushing for 1,175 rushing yards and 18 touchdowns.

== College career ==
Keene started 12 games as a true freshman and caught 10 passes for 167 yards. He was named honorable mention All-Atlantic Coast Conference after recording 28 receptions for 341 yards and three touchdowns in his sophomore season. As a junior, Keene caught 21 passes for 240 yards and five touchdowns. Following the end of the season, Keene announced that he would forgo his final year of eligibility to enter the 2020 NFL Draft. Keene finished his collegiate career with 59 receptions for 748 yards and eight touchdowns in 39 games played.

== Professional career ==
Pre-draft measurables
| Height | Weight | Arm length | Hand span | 40-yard dash | 10-yard split | 20-yard split | 20-yard shuttle | Three-cone drill | Vertical jump | Broad jump | Bench press |
|---|---|---|---|---|---|---|---|---|---|---|---|
| 6 ft 4 1/8 in (1.93 m) | 253 lb (115 kg) | 32 1/4 in (0.82 m) | 9 3/4 in (0.25 m) | 4.71 s | 1.63 s | 2.73 s | 4.19 s | 7.07 s | 34.0 in (0.86 m) | 10 ft 5 in (3.18 m) | 21 reps |
All values from NFL Combine

=== New England Patriots ===
Keene was selected in the third round with the 101st overall pick in the 2020 NFL draft by the New England Patriots. The Patriots acquired the pick from a division rival, the New York Jets, trading two fourth-round picks in the 2020 draft and a sixth-round pick in the 2021 NFL draft. It was the first time in Bill Belichick's 20 years as head coach of the Patriots that the team included a future draft pick to move up in a draft. He made his NFL debut in Week 7, recording one catch for eight yards. He was placed on injured reserve on November 10, 2020, with a knee injury. He was activated on December 5, 2020.

On August 7, 2021, Keene was placed on injured reserve with a knee injury.

On August 21, 2022, the Patriots waived Keene.

=== Philadelphia Eagles (first stint) ===
On September 6, 2022, Keene was signed to the Philadelphia Eagles practice squad. He was released on October 4.

=== Denver Broncos ===
On October 15, 2022, Keene was signed to the Denver Broncos practice squad. He was released three days later. On December 27, Keene was re-signed by the Broncos to their practice squad. His practice squad contract with the team expired after the season on January 8, 2023.

=== Philadelphia Eagles (second stint) ===
On January 20, 2023, Keene was signed to a reserve/future contract by the Eagles. He was waived on July 26.

=== Houston Texans ===
On August 1, 2023, Keene signed with the Houston Texans. He was waived on August 29, 2023 and re-signed to the practice squad. He signed a reserve/future contract on January 22, 2024. Keene was placed on injured reserve with a torn ACL on August 21.

Keene re-signed with the Texans on August 5, 2025, and was released on August 22, having suffered an undisclosed injury that necessitated an IR placement. He was re-signed to the practice squad on October 29. On November 5, Keene was released.
