= Tyler Hughes (American football coach) =

American football coach

Current position
- Title: Assistant quarterbacks coach
- Team: BYU
- Conference: Big 12

Biographical details
- Education: Utah State University (2005); University of Nebraska–Lincoln (2016)

Playing career
- 1999–2000: Snow
- Position: Wide receiver

Coaching career (HC unless noted)
- 2003: Murray HS (UT) (OC/RB)
- 2004: Snow (WR/TE)
- 2005–2010: Snow (OC/QB)
- 2011–2012: Snow
- 2013: Ohio State (QCA)
- 2014–2016: Minot State
- 2018–2019: Bountiful HS (UT)
- 2020–2022: New England Patriots (OA)
- 2023: Washington (OQC)
- 2024: New England Patriots (WR)
- 2025: Alabama (analyst)
- 2026–present: BYU (assistant QB)

Head coaching record
- Overall: 5–28 (college); 20–4 (junior college); 9–13 (high school)
- Bowls: 2–0 (junior college)

Accomplishments and honors

Championships
- 1 WSFL (2012)

Awards
- WSFL Coach of the Year (2012)

Tyler Hughes is an American football coach who is currently an assistant coach at BYU Cougars. He previously served as the wide receivers coach for the New England Patriots of the National Football League (NFL) and as an assistant for the Patriots for a few seasons prior to being hired by the University of Washington to be their wide receivers coach, before then being rehired by the Patriots.

== Early life and playing career ==
A native of Salt Lake City, Hughes attended East High School, where he was an All-Region player. He began his collegiate playing career at Snow College in Ephraim, Utah, playing as a wide receiver during the 1999 and 2000 seasons. During his time at Snow College, he was recognized with the "Badger Pride" award, given to the team member who best exemplified leadership and selflessness.

== Coaching career ==
Hughes began his coaching career in 2003, at Murray High School in Murray, Utah, serving as the offensive coordinator and running backs coach.

=== Snow ===
In 2004, Hughes returned to Snow College as the wide receivers and tight ends coach. He was promoted to offensive coordinator and quarterbacks coach in 2005, a position he held through 2010. In 2011, he became the head coach at Snow College, leading the team to a 20–4 record over two seasons, including two bowl game championships and a conference title. He was named the Western States Football League Coach of the Year in 2012 after an 11–1 season and a No. 3 national ranking.

=== Ohio State ===
In 2013, Hughes joined Ohio State as a quality control assistant, working with the quarterbacks. During his tenure, the Buckeyes finished with a 12–2 record and were ranked No. 10 nationally.

=== Southern Virginia ===
In March 2014, Hughes was appointed as the head football coach at Southern Virginia. He took over a Knights program that had finished the 2013 season 8–2 and ranked No. 1 in the United States Collegiate Athletic Association Coaches' Poll. Hughes was brought in to lead the team into a new era of NCAA Division III competition.

=== Minot State ===
After a brief tenure at Southern Virginia, Hughes accepted the head coaching position at Minot State in April 2014. He served as the head coach from 2014 to 2016, focusing on rebuilding the program and developing student-athletes both on and off the field.

=== Bountiful High School ===
Following his tenure at Minot State, Hughes was the head coach at Bountiful High School in Bountiful, Utah from 2018 to 2019. He worked to develop the high school program and mentor young athletes.

=== New England Patriots ===
Hughes joined the New England Patriots in 2020 as an offensive assistant under head coach Bill Belichick. He served in this role until 2022.

=== Washington ===
In 2023, Hughes worked as an offensive analyst at Washington, contributing to a 14–1 season and a national championship appearance. He worked closely with the offensive staff, including head coach Kalen DeBoer and offensive coordinator Ryan Grubb.

=== New England Patriots (second stint) ===
In 2024, Hughes returned to the Patriots as the wide receivers coach under head coach Jerod Mayo. After the 2024 season, he was not retained by new head coach Mike Vrabel.

=== Alabama ===
In February 2025, Hughes was hired as a football analyst at Alabama, reuniting with head coach Kalen DeBoer and offensive coordinator Ryan Grubb. His role involves supporting the offensive coaching staff and contributing to game planning and player development.

== Personal life ==
Hughes is married to Lisa Adamson, and they have four sons: Kenyon, Isaac, Will, and Max. He holds a bachelor's degree in business administration from Utah State University and a master's degree in business administration from University of Nebraska–Lincoln.

== Head coaching record ==
=== Junior college ===
Year	Team	Overall	Conference	Standing	Bowl/playoffs	AFCA^{#}
Snow Badgers (Western States Football League) (2011–2012)
2011	Snow	9–3	6–3		W Top of the Mountain Bowl	
2012	Snow	11–1	8–0	1st	W Carrier Dome Bowl	3
Snow:		20–4	14–3			
Total:		20–4				
National championship Conference title Conference division title or championship game berth

=== College ===
Year	Team	Overall	Conference	Standing	Bowl/playoffs
Minot State Beavers (Northern Sun Intercollegiate Conference) (2014–2016)
2014	Minot State	1–10	1–10	7th (North)	
2015	Minot State	1–10	1–10	T–6th (North)	
2016	Minot State	3–8	3–8	6th (North)	
Minot State:		5–28	5–28		
Total:		5–28			

=== High school ===
Year	Team	Overall	Conference	Standing	Bowl/playoffs
Bountiful Redhawks (5A Region 5) (2018–2019)
2018	Bountiful	4–6	1–4	5th	
2019	Bountiful	5–7	2–3	T–4th	
Bountiful:		9–13	3–7		
Total:		9–13			
