= Minot State Beavers football =

- First season: 1925; 101 years ago
- Head coach: Ian Shields; 1st season, 2–9 (.182)
- Location: Minot, North Dakota
- Stadium: Herb Parker Stadium (capacity: 4,300)
- NCAA division: Division II
- Conference: NSIC
- Colors: Green and red
- All-time record: 403–286–31 (.581)
- Bowl record: 0–0–0 (–)
- Outfitter: Under Armour
- Website: msubeavers.com

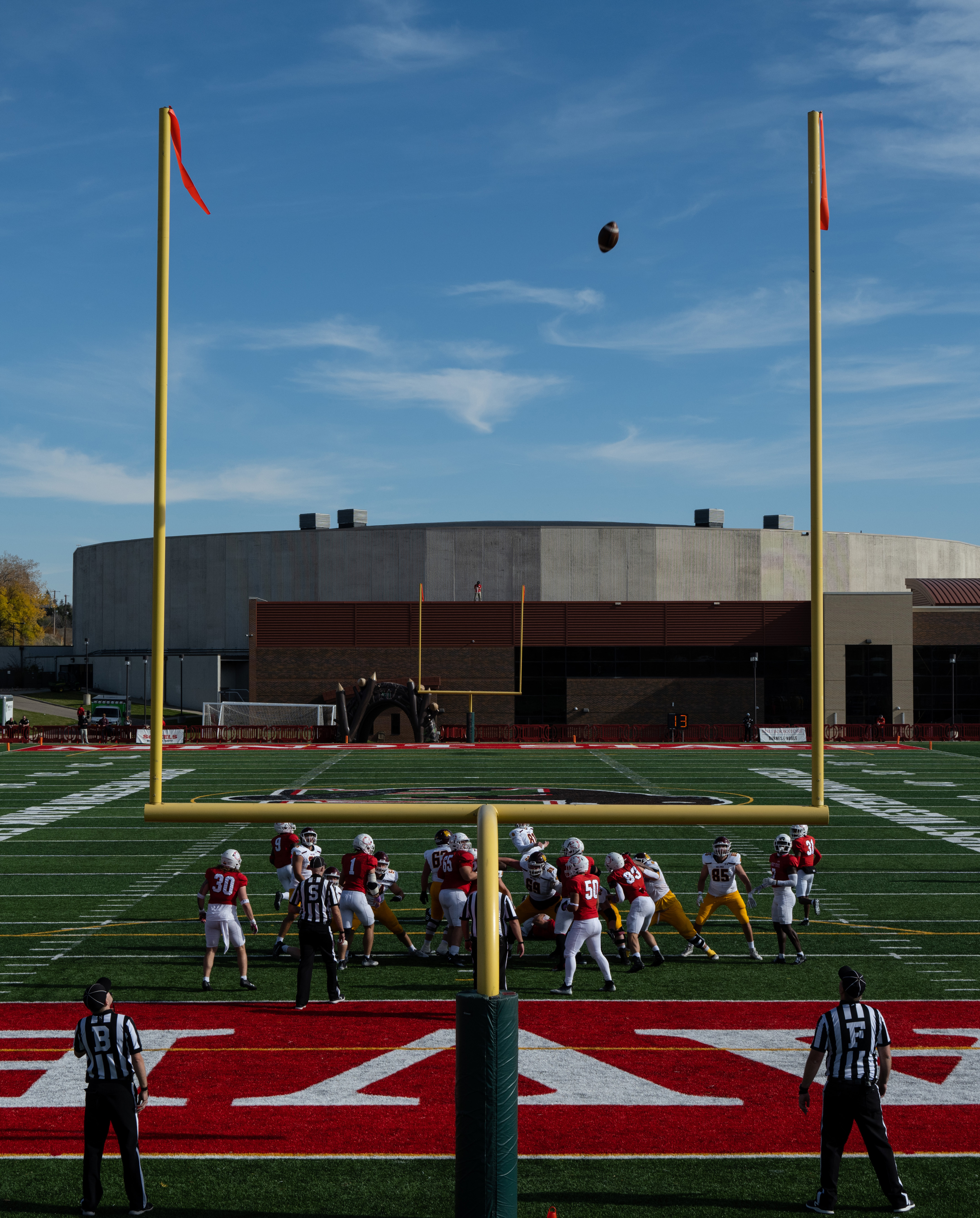
The Beavers allow a field goal to the Minnesota Duluth Bulldogs during a 2023 game at Herb Parker Stadium.

The Minot State Beavers football team is an NCAA Division II program that represents Minot State University in North Dakota. The Beavers are members of the Northern Sun Intercollegiate Conference and home games are played on campus in Minot at Herb Parker Stadium.

== Conferences ==
=== Classifications ===
- 1955–1969: NAIA
- 1970–1996: NAIA Division II
- 1997–2010: NAIA
- 2011–present: NCAA Division II

=== Conference affiliations ===
- 1925–1930: Independent
- 1931–1999: North Dakota College Athletic Conference
- 2000–2010: Dakota Athletic Conference
- 2011: Division II Independent
- 2012–present: Northern Sun Intercollegiate Conference

== Postseason appearances ==
=== NAIA ===
Minot State made seven appearances in the NAIA playoffs, with a combined record of 3–7.

Year	Round	Opponent	Result
1970	Semifinals	Anderson (IN)	L, 14–20
1991	First Round	Dickinson State	L, 21–26
1992	First Round; Quarterfinals; Semifinals	Dakota Wesleyan; Hardin–Simmons; Linfield	W, 31–0; W, 21–14; L, 12–47
1993	First Round	Mary (ND)	L, 20–31
1994	First Round; Quarterfinals	Sioux Falls; Northwestern (IA)	W, 20–13; L, 26–28
2002	First Round	Mary (ND)	L, 18–21
2009	First Round	Sioux Falls	L, 21–63

== Head coaches ==
#	Name	Term
1	Carl E. Bublitz	1925–1926
2	James W. Coleman	1927–1935
3	William D. Allen	1936–1942
4	Bill Richter	1946
5	Herb Parker	1947–1949
6	Ev Faunce	1950
7	Herb Parker	1951
8	Frank Good	1952
9	George Mellem	1953
10	Ted Keck	1954–1956
11	Vence Elgie	1957–1964
12	Bill Schaake	1965
13	Hank Hettwer	1966–1968
14	Ken Becker	1969–1974
15	Bert Leidholt	1975–1981
16	Randy Hedberg	1982–1989
17	Dave Hendrickson	1990–1999
18	Mike Sivertson	2000–2006
19	Paul Rudolph	2007–2013
20	Tyler Hughes	2014–2016
21	Mike Aldrich	2017–2022
22	Ian Shields	2023–present

== NFL players ==
Quarterback Randy Hedberg of Parshall was selected in the eighth round of the 1977 NFL draft by the Tampa Bay Buccaneers and started four games as a rookie then was on injured reserve in 1978. He later returned to Minot State as the head coach for eight seasons (1982–1989). Ron Marsh of Plentywood Montana was a 2x all American DE/OLB, played At MSU from (1978–1982) was signed UDF by the Denver Broncos.
