= Minot State Beavers =

- University: Minot State University
- Nickname: Beavers
- NCAA: Division II
- Conference: Northern Sun Intercollegiate Conference (NSIC)
- Athletic director: Kevin Harmon
- Location: Minot, North Dakota
- Football stadium: Herb Parker Stadium
- Basketball arena: MSU Dome
- Baseball stadium: Corbett Field
- Colors: Green and red
- Website: msubeavers.com
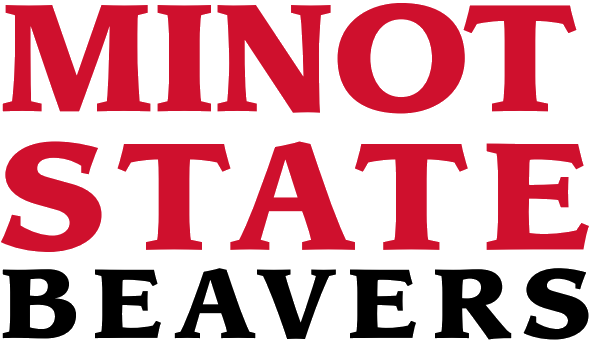

The Minot State Beavers are the intercollegiate athletic teams of Minot State University (MSU), located in Minot, North Dakota. The Beavers compete at the NCAA Division II level. The university was previously a member of the NAIA's Dakota Athletic Conference (DAC) and competed as an independent as a provisional member for the 2011–12 academic year before joining the Northern Sun Intercollegiate Conference (NSIC) in 2012. Minot State Beavers men's and women's ice hockey teams currently play in the American Collegiate Hockey Association (ACHA), the men's team plays as is an independent team at the ACHA Men's Division I level and women's team at the ACHA Women's Division II level.

== History ==
Minot State University athletics previously competed in the Dakota Athletic Conference (DAC) which was a part of the NAIA. The Minot State University Beavers won NAIA national championships in men's cross country in 2002 and 2003, the only team national championships in the school's history.

In January 2011, MSU was admitted to the NSIC with the University of Sioux Falls, also transitioning from the NAIA to NCAA Division II. The two schools joined the conference during the 2012–13 academic year creating a 16-member conference split into two 8-member divisions. MSU will compete in the NSIC North Division, consisting of Bemidji State, U-Mary, Minnesota-Crookston, Minnesota-Duluth, MSU-Moorhead, Minot State, Northern State and St. Cloud State.

In July 2012, the university became one of six universities to join the NCAA as full members, with official membership commencing on September 1, 2012. As part of the successful transition to the NCAA, Minot State will be eligible for postseason conference and NCAA postseason competition.

== National championships ==
=== Team ===
Sport	Association	Division	Year	Opponent/Runner-up	Score
Cross Country (2)	NAIA	Single	2002	Eastern Oregon	120–144 (+24)
Cross Country (2)	NAIA	Single	2003	Black Hills State	162–152
Men's Ice Hockey (3)	ACHA	I	2013	Lindenwood University	9-5
Men's Ice Hockey (3)	ACHA	I	2019	Iowa State University	3-1
Men's Ice Hockey (3)	ACHA	I	2023	Adrian College	1-0

== Sports ==
Men's sports

- Baseball
- Basketball
- Cross Country
- Football
- Golf
- Ice Hockey (ACHA)
- Track & Field
- Wrestling

Women's sports

- Basketball
- Cross Country
- Golf
- Ice Hockey (ACHA)
- Soccer
- Softball
- Track & Field
- Volleyball

=== Football ===
Minot State's football team competes in NCAA Division II. The team plays home games at Herb Parker Stadium (capacity 4,300), and has made the NCAA DII National Playoffs 9 times, including an appearance in the playoffs in 1992. The team is currently coached by Ian Shields. The Beavers have produced NFL players, including Randy Hedberg, who was an 8th round selection in the 1977 NFL Draft, and Ron Marsh, an undrafted free agent signed by the Denver Broncos.

=== Ice hockey (M) ===
Minot State men's ice hockey team competes in the ACHA Division I level as the NAIA discontinued the sponsorship of the sport in the 1980s. The team plays at the All Seasons Arena, with select games at the Maysa Arena. The men's team competes as an ACHA DI independent team and plays a schedule consisting ACHA DI members along with a number of games against local NJCAA schools, Dakota College at Bottineau Lumberjacks and newly formed Williston State College Tetons, as well as Canadian colleges. The Beavers are coached by Wyatt Waselenchuk

The Beavers have won three ACHA Men's Division I national championships (2013, 2019, 2023), and finished as runner-up in 2021.

=== Softball ===
Minot State's softball team appeared in three consecutive Women's College World Series in 1970, 1971 and 1972.
