= 2021 New England Patriots season =

62nd season in franchise history

- Owner: Robert Kraft
- Head coach: Bill Belichick
- Offensive coordinator: Josh McDaniels
- Home stadium: Gillette Stadium

Results
- Record: 10–7
- Division place: 2nd AFC East
- Playoffs: Lost Wild Card Playoffs (at Bills) 17–47
- All-Pros: CB J. C. Jackson (2nd team); ST Matthew Slater (2nd team)
- Pro Bowlers: QB Mac Jones; CB J. C. Jackson; LB Matthew Judon; ST Matthew Slater

Uniform
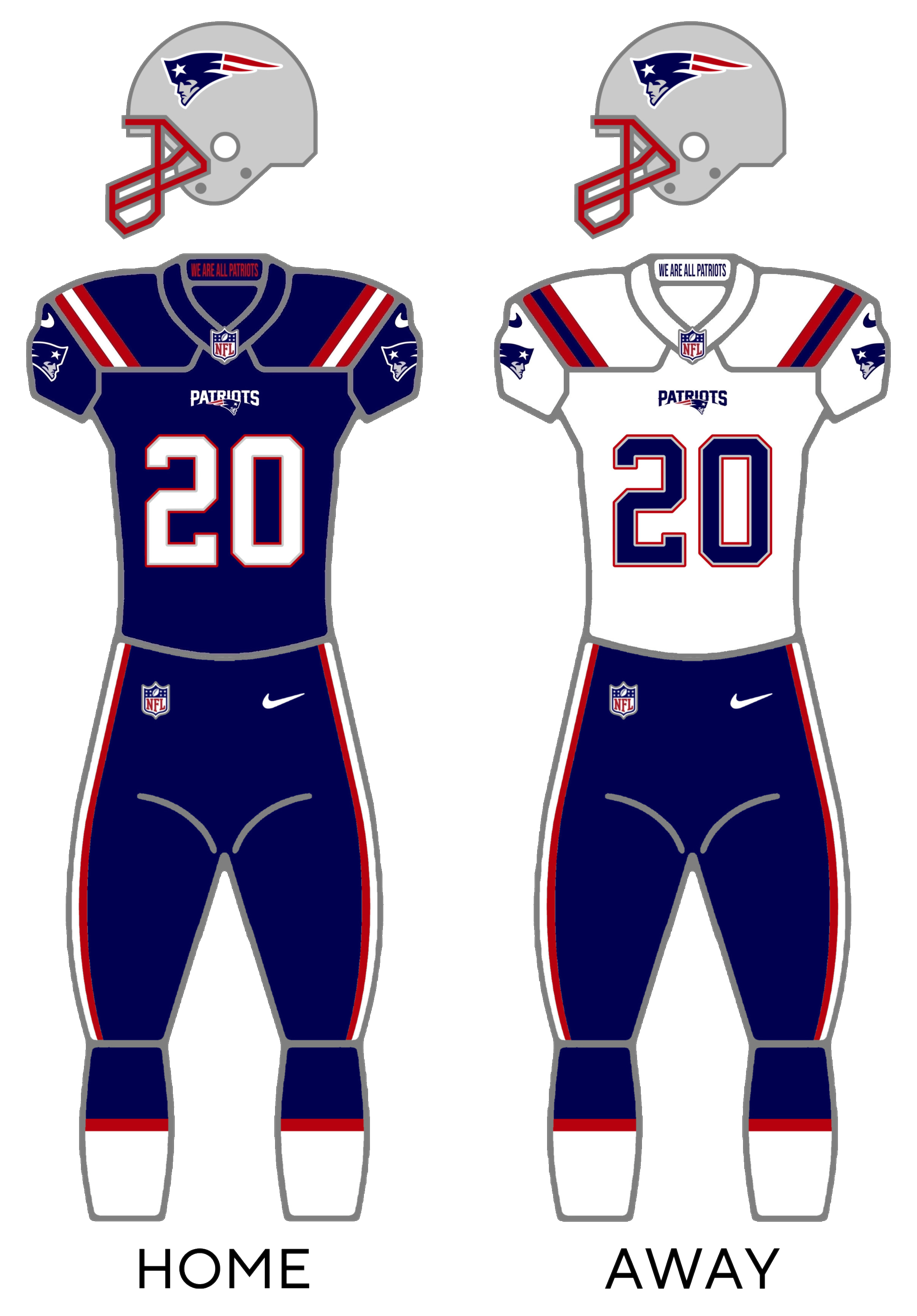

The 2021 season was the New England Patriots' 52nd in the National Football League (NFL), their 62nd overall, their 20th playing home games at Gillette Stadium, and their 22nd under head coach Bill Belichick.

Following the team's 7–9 finish the previous season, their first losing record since 2000, the Patriots spent a record $163 million in guaranteed money to sign new free agent acquisitions. 11 free agents were added to the roster on March 19, with the largest contracts awarded to linebacker Matthew Judon, tight ends Hunter Henry and Jonnu Smith, cornerback Jalen Mills, and wide receivers Kendrick Bourne and Nelson Agholor. In the 2021 NFL draft, New England selected quarterback Mac Jones 15th overall, marking the first time the Patriots drafted a first-round quarterback since Drew Bledsoe in 1993. Jones also became the first rookie quarterback to start for the Patriots since Bledsoe after he was named the starter ahead of the season opener.

The Patriots began the season 2–4, but won eight of their next 11 games and finished with a 10–7 record to secure a wild card berth. In their first playoff appearance without quarterback Tom Brady since 1998 and their first as a wild card under Belichick, they were defeated 47–17 by the division rival Buffalo Bills, the worst postseason loss of Belichick's tenure. The playoff game was also the Patriots' last with Belichick and was their last appearance until 2025.

== Roster changes ==
=== Free agency ===
==== Unrestricted ====
Position	Player	2021 team	Date signed	Contract
C	David Andrews	New England Patriots	March 22, 2021	4 years, $19 million
CB	Justin Bethel	New England Patriots	March 12, 2021	3 years, $6 million
FS	Terrence Brooks	Houston Texans	March 23, 2021	1 year, $1.75 million
RB	Rex Burkhead	Houston Texans	June 1, 2021	1 year, $1.5 million
DT	Adam Butler	Miami Dolphins	March 18, 2021	2 years, $7.5 million
WR	Damiere Byrd	Chicago Bears	May 4, 2021	1 year, $1.128 million
OLB	Shilique Calhoun	San Francisco 49ers	August 10, 2021	1 year, $990,000
OLB	Brandon Copeland	Atlanta Falcons	March 19, 2021	1 year, $1.04 million
DT	Carl Davis	New England Patriots	March 15, 2021	1 year, $1.078 million
FS	Cody Davis	New England Patriots	March 19, 2021	2 years, $4.3 million
OT	Jermaine Eluemunor	Miami Dolphins	June 14, 2021	1 year, $1.128 million
C	James Ferentz	New England Patriots	May 17, 2021	1 year, $1.020 million
K	Nick Folk	New England Patriots	March 23, 2021	1 year, $1.625 million
DT	Lawrence Guy	New England Patriots	March 30, 2021	4 years, $11.5 million
QB	Brian Hoyer	New England Patriots	May 18, 2021	1 year, $1.075 million
CB	Jason McCourty	Miami Dolphins	May 7, 2021	1 year, $1.213 million
WR	Donte Moncrief	Houston Texans	March 22, 2021	1 year, $1.15 million
QB	Cam Newton	New England Patriots	March 12, 2021	1 year, $5.1 million
DE	John Simon	Tennessee Titans	July 25, 2021	1 year, $1.075 million
G	Joe Thuney	Kansas City Chiefs	March 18, 2021	5 years, $80 million
RB	James White	New England Patriots	March 25, 2021	1 year, $2.463 million
DE	Deatrich Wise Jr.	New England Patriots	March 19, 2021	4 years, $22 million

==== Restricted ====
Position	Player	2021 team	Date signed	Contract
CB	J. C. Jackson	New England Patriots	April 16, 2021	Tendered (second-round) for 1 year, $3.384 million

==== Exclusive-rights ====
Position	Player	2021 team	Date signed	Contract
WR	Quincy Adeboyejo			
FB	Jakob Johnson	New England Patriots	March 25, 2021	1 year, $850,000

==== Signings/waiver claims ====
Position	Player	Previous team	Date signed	Contract
DE	Montravius Adams	Green Bay Packers	March 19, 2021	1 year, $1.095 million
WR	Nelson Agholor	Las Vegas Raiders	March 19, 2021	2 years, $22 million
DE	Henry Anderson	New York Jets	March 19, 2021	2 years, $7 million
WR	Kendrick Bourne	San Francisco 49ers	March 19, 2021	3 years, $15 million
TE	Hunter Henry	Los Angeles Chargers	March 19, 2021	3 years, $37.5 million
LB	Matthew Judon	Baltimore Ravens	March 19, 2021	4 years, $54.5 million
C	Ted Karras	Miami Dolphins	March 19, 2021	1 year, $3 million
LB	Raekwon McMillan	Las Vegas Raiders	March 19, 2021	1 year, $1.149 million
CB	Jalen Mills	Philadelphia Eagles	March 19, 2021	4 years, $24 million
TE	Jonnu Smith	Tennessee Titans	March 19, 2021	4 years, $50 million
LB	Kyle Van Noy	Miami Dolphins	March 19, 2021	2 years, $12 million
DT	Davon Godchaux	Miami Dolphins	March 23, 2021	2 years, $15 million
LB	LaRoy Reynolds	Atlanta Falcons	March 24, 2021	1 year, $1.213 million
LB	Harvey Langi	New York Jets	May 10, 2021	1 year, $1.057 million
G	Alex Redmond	Cincinnati Bengals	May 17, 2021	1 year, $1.080 million
LS	Wesley Farnsworth	Denver Broncos	May 20, 2021	1 year, $660,000
FS	Adrian Colbert	New York Giants	May 21, 2021	1 year, $990,000
RB	Tyler Gaffney	San Francisco 49ers	May 21, 2021	1 year, $660,000
TE	Troy Fumagalli	Denver Broncos	May 27, 2021	1 year, $850,000
WR	Marvin Hall	Cleveland Browns	June 4, 2021	1 year, $1.015 million
G	R. J. Prince	Baltimore Ravens	June 17, 2021	1 year, $780,000
WR	Devin Ross	New England Patriots	June 21, 2021	1 year, $660,000
TE	David Wells	New England Patriots	July 23, 2021	1 year, $660,000
QB	Jake Dolegala	Green Bay Packers	July 28, 2021	1 year, $780,000
OT	Jerald Hawkins	Pittsburgh Steelers	July 30, 2021	1 year, $920,000
LB	Cassh Maluia	New England Patriots	August 7, 2021	1 year, $780,000
LS	Brian Khoury	Baltimore Ravens	August 9, 2021	1 year, $660,000
SS	Malik Gant	New England Patriots	August 10, 2021	1 year, $660,000
TE	Kahale Warring	Houston Texans	August 24, 2021	4 years, $3.640 million
WR	Malcolm Perry	Miami Dolphins	September 2, 2021	4 years, 3.370 million
LB	Jamie Collins	Detroit Lions	October 6, 2021	1 year, 1.075 million

=== Releases/waivers ===
Position	Player	Date released/waived
DT	Beau Allen	March 18, 2021
WR	Marqise Lee	March 18, 2021
LB	Cassh Maluia	March 23, 2021
LB	Michael Pinkney	March 23, 2021
K	Justin Rohrwasser	March 23, 2021
G	Ross Reynolds	April 9, 2021
DT	Michael Barnett	April 12, 2021
C	Dustin Woodard	April 16, 2021
QB	Jake Dolegala	April 30, 2021
G	Najee Toran	May 18, 2021
LB	LaRoy Reynolds	May 27, 2021
FB	Danny Vitale	May 27, 2021
K	Roberto Aguayo	June 17, 2021
LS	Wesley Farnsworth	June 17, 2021
WR	Devin Smith	July 27, 2021
QB	Jake Dolegala	August 9, 2021
RB	Tyler Gaffney	August 10, 2021
DE	Rashod Berry	August 15, 2021
WR	Marvin Hall	August 15, 2021
TE	David Wells	August 15, 2021
OT	Jerald Hawkins	August 16, 2021
TE	Troy Fumagalli	August 17, 2021
SS	Malik Gant	August 24, 2021
LS	Brian Khoury	August 24, 2021
LB	Cassh Maluia	August 24, 2021
G	R. J. Prince	August 24, 2021
WR	Devin Ross	August 24, 2021
TE	Kahale Warring	August 27, 2021
DT	Montravius Adams	August 31, 2021
DE	Tashawn Bower	August 31, 2021
CB	Myles Bryant	August 31, 2021
FS	Adrian Colbert	August 31, 2021
OT	Korey Cunningham	August 31, 2021
C	James Ferentz	August 31, 2021
K	Nick Folk	August 31, 2021
QB	Brian Hoyer	August 31, 2021
CB	Mike Jackson Sr.	August 31, 2021
TE	Matt LaCosse	August 31, 2021
DT	Bill Murray	August 31, 2021
QB	Cam Newton	August 31, 2021
WR	Tre Nixon	August 31, 2021
G	Alex Redmond	August 31, 2021
CB	D'Angelo Ross	August 31, 2021
OT	Will Sherman	August 31, 2021
DT	Akeem Spence	August 31, 2021
DT	Nick Thurman	August 31, 2021
CB	Dee Virgin	August 31, 2021
WR	Kristian Wilkerson	August 31, 2021
WR	Isaiah Zuber	August 31, 2021

=== Retirements ===
Position	Player	Date retired
S	Patrick Chung	March 18, 2021
WR	Julian Edelman	April 12, 2021

=== Trades ===
- March 18 – Offensive tackle Marcus Cannon, the Patriots' 2021 fifth-round selection (No. 158 overall), and 2021 sixth-round selection (No. 194 overall) were traded to the Houston Texans for the Texans' 2021 fourth-round selection (No. 122 overall, originally acquired from Arizona) and 2021 sixth-round selection (No. 187 overall).
- March 18 – The Patriots' 2022 fifth-round selection was traded to the Las Vegas Raiders for offensive tackle Trent Brown and the Raiders' 2022 seventh-round selection.
- March 23 – Tight end Ryan Izzo was traded to the Houston Texans for the Texans' 2022 seventh-round selection.
- August 25 – Running back Sony Michel was traded to the Los Angeles Rams for the Rams' 2022 sixth and 2023 fourth round selections.
- August 26 – The Patriots' 2022 seventh-round selection (originally acquired from Houston) and 2023 fifth-round selection were traded to the Baltimore Ravens for cornerback Shaun Wade.
- August 31 – The Patriots' 2022 seventh-round selection was traded to the Kansas City Chiefs for offensive tackle Yasir Durant.
- October 6 – Cornerback Stephon Gilmore was traded to the Carolina Panthers for the Panthers' 2023 sixth-round selection.

== Draft ==
2021 New England Patriots Draft
Round	Selection	Player	Position	College	Notes
1	15	Mac Jones	QB	Alabama	
2	38	Christian Barmore	DT	Alabama	from Cincinnati
3	—	Selection forfeited			
3	96	Ronnie Perkins	DE	Oklahoma	Compensatory pick
4	120	Rhamondre Stevenson	RB	Oklahoma	
5	177	Cameron McGrone	LB	Michigan	Compensatory pick
6	188	Joshuah Bledsoe	FS	Missouri	from Houston
6	197	Will Sherman	OT	Colorado	
7	242	Tre Nixon	WR	UCF	

Notes

- The Cincinnati Bengals' 2021 second-round selection (No. 38 overall) was acquired in a trade that sent the Patriots' 2021 second-round selection (No. 46 overall) and two fourth-round selections (No. 122 and 139 overall) to the Bengals.
- The Patriots forfeited their third-round selection as the punishment for illegal filming of the field and sidelines by the team's television crew of a 2019 game between the Cincinnati Bengals and Cleveland Browns.
- The Houston Texans' 2021 fourth-round selection (No. 122 overall) and 2021 sixth-round selection (No. 188 overall) were acquired in a trade that sent offensive tackle Marcus Cannon, the Patriots' 2021 fifth-round selection (No. 158 overall), and the previously acquired Dallas Cowboys 2021 sixth-round selection (No. 194 overall) to the Texans.
- A sixth-round selection (No. 185 overall) was acquired in a trade that sent wide receiver Demaryius Thomas to the New York Jets. The Jets re-acquired this selection when the Patriots traded two of their 2020 fourth-round selections and this 2021 sixth-round selection in exchange for a 2020 third-round selection.
- An additional sixth-round selection (No. 194 overall) was obtained in the trade that sent defensive end Michael Bennett to the Dallas Cowboys.

=== Undrafted free agents ===
Position	Player	School	Date signed
K	Quinn Nordin	Michigan	May 6, 2021

== Staff ==
2021 New England Patriots staff
Front office: Chairman/CEO – Robert Kraft; President – Jonathan Kraft; Director of player personnel – Dave Ziegler; Personnel coordinator – Brian Smith; College scouting coordinator – Matt Groh; Pro scouting coordinator – Steve Cargile; Director of scouting administration – Nancy Meier; National scout – Camren Williams; Director of football/head coach administration – Berj Najarian; Associate director of football administration – Bobby Brown; Scouting consultant – Eliot Wolf; Director of research – Richard Miller; Senior football advisor – Matt Patricia; Research and analysis/coaching – Evan Rothstein; Head coaches: Head coach – Bill Belichick; Offensive coaches: Offensive coordinator/quarterbacks – Josh McDaniels; Quality control/quarterbacks – Bo Hardegree; Running backs – Ivan Fears; Running backs – Vinnie Sunseri; Wide receivers/kick returners - Troy Brown; Wide receivers – Mick Lombardi; Tight ends/fullbacks – Nick Caley; Offensive line – Carmen Bricillo; Offensive line – Cole Popovich*; Assistant offensive line – Billy Yates; Offensive assistant – Tyler Hughes	Defensive coaches: Defensive line – DeMarcus Covington; Inside linebackers – Jerod Mayo; Outside linebackers – Steve Belichick; Cornerbacks – Mike Pellegrino; Safeties – Brian Belichick; NFL coaching fellowship/defense – Ross Douglas; Special teams coaches: Special teams coordinator – Cam Achord; Special teams assistant – Joe Houston; Strength and conditioning: Head strength and conditioning – Moses Cabrera; Strength and conditioning assistant – Deron Mayo; Director of skill development – Joe Kim

- July 23: Cole Popovich left the team as co-offensive line coach after refusing to receive the COVID-19 vaccine.

== Final roster ==
2021 New England Patriots roster
Quarterbacks (QB): 5 Brian Hoyer; 10 Mac Jones; 4 Jarrett Stidham; Running backs (RB): 25 Brandon Bolden; 37 Damien Harris; 47 Jakob Johnson FB; 38 Rhamondre Stevenson; 42 J. J. Taylor; Wide receivers (WR): 15 Nelson Agholor; 84 Kendrick Bourne; 1 N'Keal Harry; 16 Jakobi Meyers; 80 Gunner Olszewski; 18 Matthew Slater; Tight ends (TE): 86 Devin Asiasi; 85 Hunter Henry; 81 Jonnu Smith	Offensive linemen (OL): 60 David Andrews C; 77 Trent Brown T; 72 Yodny Cajuste T; 70 Yasir Durant G; 75 Justin Herron T; 67 Ted Karras C; 69 Shaq Mason G; 71 Michael Onwenu G; 76 Isaiah Wynn T; Defensive linemen (DL): 90 Christian Barmore DT; 98 Carl Davis DT; 92 Davon Godchaux DT; 93 Lawrence Guy DT; 50 Chase Winovich DE; 91 Deatrich Wise Jr. DE	Linebackers (LB): 8 Ja'Whaun Bentley MLB; 58 Jamie Collins OLB; 54 Dont'a Hightower MLB; 9 Matthew Judon OLB; 36 Brandon King OLB; 48 Jahlani Tavai MLB; 55 Josh Uche OLB; 53 Kyle Van Noy OLB; Defensive backs (DB): 29 Justin Bethel CB; 41 Myles Bryant CB; 22 Cody Davis FS; 23 Kyle Dugger SS; 27 J. C. Jackson CB; 32 Devin McCourty FS; 21 Adrian Phillips SS; 33 Joejuan Williams CB; Special teams (ST): 7 Jake Bailey P; 49 Joe Cardona LS; 6 Nick Folk K	Practice squad: 13 De'Vante Bausby CB; 35 D. J. Daniel CB; 30 Sean Davis FS; 95 Daniel Ekuale DT; 65 James Ferentz C; 83 Matt LaCosse TE; 24 Cre'Von LeBlanc CB; 97 Bill Murray DT; 87 Tre Nixon WR; 3 Quinn Nordin K; 34 Devine Ozigbo RB; 64 Alex Redmond G (PS/I); 59 LaRoy Reynolds MLB; 39 D'Angelo Ross CB; 68 Will Sherman T; 88 Jaylen Smith WR; 17 Kristian Wilkerson WR; Reserve: 94 Henry Anderson DE (IR); -- Joshuah Bledsoe FS (IR); 99 Byron Cowart DT (PUP); -- Troy Fumagalli TE (IR); -- Terez Hall OLB (PUP); -- Anfernee Jennings OLB (IR); 31 Jonathan Jones CB (IR); 44 Dalton Keene TE (IR); 52 Harvey Langi MLB (IR); 45 Cameron McGrone OLB (NF-Inj.); 46 Raekwon McMillan MLB (IR); 2 Jalen Mills CB (COVID-19); 51 Ronnie Perkins DE (IR); 19 Malcolm Perry WR (Futures); 26 Shaun Wade CB (COVID-19); 28 James White RB (IR); Rookies in italics 51 active, 16 reserve, 16 practice squad (1 exempt)

== Preseason ==
Week	Date	Opponent	Result	Record	Venue	Recap
1	August 12	Washington Football Team	W 22–13	1–0	Gillette Stadium	Recap
2	August 19	at Philadelphia Eagles	W 35–0	2–0	Lincoln Financial Field	Recap
3	August 29	at New York Giants	W 22–20	3–0	MetLife Stadium	Recap

== Regular season ==
=== Schedule ===
The Patriots' 2021 schedule was announced on May 12.

Week	Date	Opponent	Result	Record	Venue	Recap
1	September 12	**Miami Dolphins**	**L** 16–17	0–1	Gillette Stadium	Recap
2	September 19	at **New York Jets**	**W** 25–6	1–1	MetLife Stadium	Recap
3	September 26	New Orleans Saints	**L** 13–28	1–2	Gillette Stadium	Recap
4	October 3	Tampa Bay Buccaneers	**L** 17–19	1–3	Gillette Stadium	Recap
5	October 10	at Houston Texans	**W** 25–22	2–3	NRG Stadium	Recap
6	October 17	Dallas Cowboys	**L** 29–35 (OT)	2–4	Gillette Stadium	Recap
7	October 24	**New York Jets**	**W** 54–13	3–4	Gillette Stadium	Recap
8	October 31	at Los Angeles Chargers	**W** 27–24	4–4	SoFi Stadium	Recap
9	November 7	at Carolina Panthers	**W** 24–6	5–4	Bank of America Stadium	Recap
10	November 14	Cleveland Browns	**W** 45–7	6–4	Gillette Stadium	Recap
11	November 18	at Atlanta Falcons	**W** 25–0	7–4	Mercedes-Benz Stadium	Recap
12	November 28	Tennessee Titans	**W** 36–13	8–4	Gillette Stadium	Recap
13	December 6	at **Buffalo Bills**	**W** 14–10	9–4	Highmark Stadium	Recap
14	Bye					
15	December 18	at Indianapolis Colts	**L** 17–27	9–5	Lucas Oil Stadium	Recap
16	December 26	**Buffalo Bills**	**L** 21–33	9–6	Gillette Stadium	Recap
17	January 2	Jacksonville Jaguars	**W** 50–10	10–6	Gillette Stadium	Recap
18	January 9	at **Miami Dolphins**	**L** 24–33	10–7	Hard Rock Stadium	Recap

Note: Intra-division opponents are in bold text.

=== Game summaries ===
==== Week 1: vs. Miami Dolphins ====
Week 1: Miami Dolphins at New England Patriots – Game summary

Quarter	1	2	3	4	Total
**Dolphins**	7	3	7	0	**17**
Patriots	0	10	3	3	**16**

at Gillette Stadium, Foxborough, Massachusetts

- Date: September 12
- Game time: 4:25 p.m. EDT
- Game weather: Partly cloudy, 82 °F (28 °C)
- Game attendance: 65,878
- Referee: Clete Blakeman
- TV announcers (CBS): Kevin Harlan, Trent Green and Melanie Collins
- Recap, Game Book

Game information

**First quarter**

- MIA – Tua Tagovailoa 3-yard run (Jason Sanders kick), 5:29. Dolphins 7–0. **Drive: 10 plays, 80 yards, 5:05.**

**Second quarter**

- NE – Nick Folk 27-yard field goal, 10:17. Dolphins 7–3. **Drive: 14 plays, 65 yards, 6:56.**
- NE – Nelson Agholor 7-yard pass from Mac Jones (Nick Folk kick), 2:35. Patriots 10–7. **Drive: 7 plays, 63 yards, 3:36.**
- MIA – Jason Sanders 48-yard field goal, 0:00. Tied 10–10. **Drive: 8 plays, 45 yards, 2:30.**

**Third quarter**

- MIA – Jaylen Waddle 3-yard pass from Tua Tagovailoa (Jason Sanders kick), 10:51. Dolphins 17–10. **Drive: 9 plays, 75 yards, 4:09.**
- NE – Nick Folk 42-yard field goal, 2:50. Dolphins 17–13. **Drive: 14 plays, 67 yards, 8:01.**

**Fourth quarter**

- NE – Nick Folk 33-yard field goal, 10:36. Dolphins 17–16. **Drive: 14 plays, 57 yards, 5:37.**

**Top passers**

- MIA – Tua Tagovailoa – 16/27, 202 yards, TD, INT
- NE – Mac Jones – 29/39, 281 yards, TD

**Top rushers**

- MIA – Myles Gaskin – 9 rushes, 49 yards
- NE – Damien Harris – 23 rushes, 100 yards

**Top receivers**

- MIA – Jaylen Waddle – 4 receptions, 61 yards, TD
- NE – Nelson Agholor – 5 receptions, 72 yards, TD

In rookie quarterback Mac Jones' first NFL start, a back-and-forth affair against divisional opponent Miami was sealed when Patriots running back Damien Harris fumbled the ball in the fourth quarter, allowing the Dolphins to run out the clock. With the close loss, the Patriots began the season 0–1 for the first time since 2017.

==== Week 2: at New York Jets ====
Week 2: New England Patriots at New York Jets – Game summary

Quarter	1	2	3	4	Total
**Patriots**	10	3	9	3	**25**
Jets	0	3	0	3	**6**

at MetLife Stadium, East Rutherford, New Jersey

- Date: September 19
- Game time: 1:00 p.m. EDT
- Game weather: Sunny, 73 °F (23 °C)
- Game attendance: 75,626
- Referee: Shawn Hochuli
- TV announcers (CBS): Kevin Harlan, Trent Green and Melanie Collins
- Recap, Game Book

Game information

**First quarter**

- NE – Nick Folk 46-yard field goal, 4:46. Patriots 3–0. **Drive: 6 plays, 7 yards, 2:59.**
- NE – James White 7-yard run (Nick Folk kick), 0:57. Patriots 10–0. **Drive: 6 plays, 72 yards, 3:13.**

**Second quarter**

- NYJ – Matt Ammendola 21-yard field goal, 9:52. Patriots 10–3. **Drive: 11 plays, 59 yards, 6:05.**
- NE – Nick Folk 49-yard field goal, 0:13. Patriots 13–3. **Drive: 10 plays, 38 yards, 1:56.**

**Third quarter**

- NE – Damien Harris 26-yard run (kick failed), 10:24. Patriots 19–3. **Drive: 2 plays, 35 yards, 0:51.**
- NE – Nick Folk 32-yard field goal, 1:09. Patriots 22–3. **Drive: 8 plays, 43 yards, 3:31.**

**Fourth quarter**

- NYJ – Matt Ammendola 35-yard field goal, 6:11. Patriots 22–6. **Drive: 12 plays, 66 yards, 5:01.**
- NE – Nick Folk 26-yard field goal, 1:57. Patriots 25–6. **Drive: 7 plays, 17 yards, 2:34.**

**Top passers**

- NE – Mac Jones – 22/30, 186 yards
- NYJ – Zach Wilson – 19/33, 210 yards, 4 INT

**Top rushers**

- NE – Damien Harris – 16 rushes, 62 yards, TD
- NYJ – Michael Carter – 11 rushes, 59 yards

**Top receivers**

- NE – James White – 6 receptions, 45 yards
- NYJ – Braxton Berrios – 7 receptions, 73 yards

A battle of rookie quarterbacks saw Zach Wilson of the Jets throw four interceptions to the Patriots defense, allowing New England to coast to a 25–6 win, its 11th straight win over divisional rival New York. Mac Jones completed over 70% of his passes for the second game in a row.

==== Week 3: vs. New Orleans Saints ====
Week 3: New Orleans Saints at New England Patriots – Game summary

Quarter	1	2	3	4	Total
**Saints**	7	7	7	7	**28**
Patriots	0	3	3	7	**13**

at Gillette Stadium, Foxborough, Massachusetts

- Date: September 26
- Game time: 1:00 p.m. EDT
- Game weather: Sunny, 70 °F (21 °C)
- Game attendance: 65,878
- Referee: John Hussey
- TV announcers (Fox): Adam Amin, Mark Schlereth and Shannon Spake
- Recap, Game Book

Game information

**First quarter**

- NO – Alvin Kamara 11-yard pass from Jameis Winston (Aldrick Rosas kick), 7:35. Saints 7–0. **Drive: 11 plays, 69 yards, 4:58.**

**Second quarter**

- NO – Marquez Callaway 7-yard pass from Jameis Winston (Aldrick Rosas kick), 1:44. Saints 14–0. **Drive: 3 plays, 9 yards, 1:00.**
- NE – Nick Folk 45-yard field goal, 0:34. Saints 14–3. **Drive: 6 plays, 48 yards, 1:10.**

**Third quarter**

- NO – Malcolm Jenkins 34-yard interception return (Aldrick Rosas kick), 14:51. Saints 21–3.
- NE – Nick Folk 26-yard field goal, 1:32. Saints 21–6. **Drive: 16 plays, 72 yards, 9:05.**

**Fourth quarter**

- NE – Kendrick Bourne 22-yard pass from Mac Jones (Nick Folk kick), 9:22. Saints 21–13. **Drive: 3 plays, 44 yards, 1:06.**
- NO – Taysom Hill 4-yard run (Aldrick Rosas kick), 2:37. Saints 28–13. **Drive: 13 plays, 75 yards, 6:45.**

**Top passers**

- NO – Jameis Winston – 13/21, 128 yards, 2 TD
- NE – Mac Jones – 30/51, 270 yards, TD, 3 INT

**Top rushers**

- NO – Alvin Kamara – 24 rushes, 89 yards
- NE – Mac Jones – 6 rushes, 28 yards

**Top receivers**

- NO – Marquez Callaway – 4 receptions, 41 yards, TD
- NE – Kendrick Bourne – 6 receptions, 96 yards, TD

Jones threw three interceptions, including a pass bobbled by tight end Jonnu Smith before being returned by P. J. Williams for a touchdown, as the Patriots lost to the Saints 28–13 and dropped to 1–2. This was also the Patriots' first loss to the Saints since 2009.

==== Week 4: vs. Tampa Bay Buccaneers ====
Week 4: Tampa Bay Buccaneers at New England Patriots – Game summary

Quarter	1	2	3	4	Total
**Buccaneers**	3	3	7	6	**19**
Patriots	0	7	0	10	**17**

at Gillette Stadium, Foxborough, Massachusetts

- Date: October 3
- Game time: 8:20 p.m. EDT
- Game weather: Rain, 61 °F (16 °C)
- Game attendance: 65,878
- Referee: Bill Vinovich
- TV announcers (NBC): Al Michaels, Cris Collinsworth and Michele Tafoya
- Recap, Game Book

Game information

**First quarter**

- TB – Ryan Succop 45-yard field goal, 4:49. Buccaneers 3–0. **Drive: 10 plays, 71 yards, 3:53.**

**Second quarter**

- NE – Hunter Henry 11-yard pass from Mac Jones (Nick Folk kick), 8:28. Patriots 7–3. **Drive: 11 plays, 74 yards, 6:21.**
- TB – Ryan Succop 44-yard field goal, 0:13. Patriots 7–6. **Drive: 8 plays, 69 yards, 1:36.**

**Third quarter**

- TB – Ronald Jones II 8-yard run (Ryan Succop kick), 3:29. Buccaneers 13–7. **Drive: 8 plays, 52 yards, 3:48.**

**Fourth quarter**

- NE – Jonnu Smith 1-yard pass from Mac Jones (Nick Folk kick), 14:57. Patriots 14–13. **Drive: 7 plays, 77 yards, 3:32.**
- TB – Ryan Succop 27-yard field goal, 7:58. Buccaneers 16–14. **Drive: 15 plays, 68 yards, 6:59.**
- NE – Nick Folk 27-yard field goal, 4:34. Patriots 17–16. **Drive: 8 plays, 66 yards, 3:24.**
- TB – Ryan Succop 48-yard field goal, 1:57. Buccaneers 19–17. **Drive: 7 plays, 45 yards, 2:37.**

**Top passers**

- TB – Tom Brady – 22/43, 269 yards
- NE – Mac Jones – 31/40, 275 yards, 2 TD, INT

**Top rushers**

- TB – Leonard Fournette – 20 rushes, 91 yards
- NE – Nelson Agholor – 1 rush, 4 yards

**Top receivers**

- TB – Mike Evans – 7 receptions, 75 yards
- NE – Jakobi Meyers – 8 receptions, 70 yards

This game marked former Patriots quarterback Tom Brady's first return to Gillette Stadium since leaving the team after the 2019 season, as he was cheered by the home crowd during pre-game introductions before being jeered during the game. During the rain-soaked, back-and-forth contest, Brady was held without a touchdown and completed just over half of his passes; he was held to his third lowest passer rating – 70.8 – since joining the Buccaneers but led them to a go-ahead field goal just after the two-minute warning. Jones, who passed for 2 touchdowns and an interception, led the Patriots into position for their own field goal, but Nick Folk's 56-yard attempt hit the left upright, sealing the loss for the Patriots to their former franchise quarterback.

==== Week 5: at Houston Texans ====
Week 5: New England Patriots at Houston Texans – Game summary

Quarter	1	2	3	4	Total
**Patriots**	0	9	6	10	**25**
Texans	6	9	7	0	**22**

at NRG Stadium, Houston, Texas

- Date: October 10
- Game time: 1:00 p.m. EDT/12:00 p.m. CDT
- Game weather: None (retractable roof closed)
- Game attendance: 68,450
- Referee: Scott Novak
- TV announcers (CBS): Andrew Catalon, James Lofton and Amanda Balionis
- Recap, Game Book

Game information

**First quarter**

- HOU – Antony Auclair 11-yard pass from Davis Mills (kick failed), 4:45. Texans 6–0. **Drive: 18 plays, 79 yards, 10:06.**

**Second quarter**

- NE – Damien Harris 1-yard run (kick failed), 14:17. Tied 6–6. **Drive: 10 plays, 60 yards, 5:37.**
- HOU – Chris Moore 67-yard pass from Davis Mills (kick failed), 12:56. Texans 12–6. **Drive: 3 plays, 75 yards, 1:21.**
- HOU – Kaʻimi Fairbairn 33-yard field goal, 1:37. Texans 15–6. **Drive: 15 plays, 65 yards, 7:11.**
- NE – Nick Folk 52-yard field goal, 0:02. Texans 15–9. **Drive: 9 plays, 42 yards, 1:35.**

**Third quarter**

- HOU – Chris Conley 37-yard pass from Davis Mills (Kaʻimi Fairbairn kick), 13:31. Texans 22–9. **Drive: 2 plays, 44 yards, 0:42.**
- NE – Nick Folk 52-yard field goal, 8:25. Texans 22–12. **Drive: 4 plays, 3 yards, 1:57.**
- NE – Nick Folk 32-yard field goal, 1:50. Texans 22–15. **Drive: 7 plays, 47 yards, 3:58.**

**Fourth quarter**

- NE – Hunter Henry 13-yard pass from Mac Jones (Nick Folk kick), 9:31. Tied 22–22. **Drive: 7 plays, 54 yards, 3:54.**
- NE – Nick Folk 21-yard field goal, 0:15. Patriots 25–22. **Drive: 15 plays, 84 yards, 7:00.**

**Top passers**

- NE – Mac Jones – 23/30, 231 yards, TD, INT
- HOU – Davis Mills – 21/29, 312 yards, 3 TD

**Top rushers**

- NE – Damien Harris – 14 rushes, 58 yards, TD
- HOU – Mark Ingram II – 16 rushes, 41 yards

**Top receivers**

- NE – Hunter Henry – 6 receptions, 75 yards, TD
- HOU – Chris Moore – 5 receptions, 109 yards, TD

Despite being down 22–9 to Houston at one point, the Patriots came back to win – coincidentally in the same stadium where they overcame a 28–3 deficit to the Atlanta Falcons to win Super Bowl LI. Aside from a missed extra point in the first half, Nick Folk made four field goals during the game, including the game-winner with 15 seconds left in the game. With the win, New England improved to 2–3, taking sole possession of 2nd place in the AFC East. This marked the Patriots last win over the Texans until 2025.

==== Week 6: vs. Dallas Cowboys ====
Week 6: Dallas Cowboys at New England Patriots – Game summary

Quarter	1	2	3	4	OT	Total
**Cowboys**	7	3	7	12	6	**35**
Patriots	14	0	0	15	0	**29**

at Gillette Stadium, Foxborough, Massachusetts

- Date: October 17
- Game time: 4:25 p.m. EDT
- Game weather: Partly cloudy, 61 °F (16 °C)
- Game attendance: 65,878
- Referee: Brad Allen
- TV announcers (CBS): Jim Nantz, Tony Romo and Tracy Wolfson
- Recap, Game Book

Game information

**First quarter**

- NE – Damien Harris 4-yard run (Nick Folk kick), 10:20. Patriots 7–0. **Drive: 3 plays, 34 yards, 1:41.**
- DAL – Blake Jarwin 1-yard pass from Dak Prescott (Greg Zuerlein kick), 6:43. Tied 7–7. **Drive: 7 plays, 75 yards, 3:37.**
- NE – Hunter Henry 20-yard pass from Mac Jones (Nick Folk kick), 4:50. Patriots 14–7. **Drive: 4 plays, 75 yards, 1:53.**

**Second quarter**

- DAL – Greg Zuerlein 30-yard field goal, 6:39. Patriots 14–10. **Drive: 9 plays, 40 yards, 3:26.**

**Third quarter**

- DAL – CeeDee Lamb 1-yard pass from Dak Prescott (Greg Zuerlein kick), 4:49. Cowboys 17–14. **Drive: 8 plays, 91 yards, 4:29.**

**Fourth quarter**

- DAL – Greg Zuerlein 45-yard field goal, 13:13. Cowboys 20–14. **Drive: 9 plays, 61 yards, 3:45.**
- NE – Rhamondre Stevenson 1-yard run (Nick Folk kick), 6:23. Patriots 21–20. **Drive: 13 plays, 75 yards, 6:50.**
- DAL – Trevon Diggs 42-yard interception return (pass failed), 2:27. Cowboys 26–21.
- NE – Kendrick Bourne 75-yard pass from Mac Jones (Mac Jones-Jakobi Meyers pass), 2:11. Patriots 29–26. **Drive: 1 play, 75 yards, 0:16.**
- DAL – Greg Zuerlein 49-yard field goal, 0:20. Tied 29–29. **Drive: 9 plays, 40 yards, 1:51.**

**Overtime**

- DAL – CeeDee Lamb 35-yard pass from Dak Prescott, 3:52. Cowboys 35–29.

**Top passers**

- DAL – Dak Prescott – 36/51, 445 yards, 3 TD, INT
- NE – Mac Jones – 15/21, 229 yards, 2 TD, INT

**Top rushers**

- DAL – Ezekiel Elliott – 17 rushes, 69 yards, TD
- NE – Damien Harris – 18 rushes, 101 yards, TD

**Top receivers**

- DAL – CeeDee Lamb – 9 receptions, 149 yards, 2 TD
- NE – Kendrick Bourne – 1 reception, 75 yards, TD

This was the Patriots' first overtime game since the 2018 AFC Championship game against the Kansas City Chiefs. This was the Pats' first loss to the Cowboys in 25 years and their first home loss to them in 34 years.

==== Week 7: vs. New York Jets ====
Week 7: New York Jets at New England Patriots – Game summary

Quarter	1	2	3	4	Total
Jets	0	7	6	0	**13**
**Patriots**	14	17	3	20	**54**

at Gillette Stadium, Foxborough, Massachusetts

- Date: October 24
- Game time: 1:00 p.m. EDT
- Game weather: Sunny, 54 °F (12 °C)
- Game attendance: 65,878
- Referee: Brad Rogers
- TV announcers (CBS): Andrew Catalon, James Lofton and Amanda Balionis
- Recap, Game Book

Game information

**First quarter**

- NE – Nelson Agholor 25-yard pass from Kendrick Bourne (Nick Folk kick), 12:43. Patriots 7–0. **Drive: 4 plays, 65 yards, 2:17.**
- NE – Damien Harris 1-yard run (Nick Folk kick), 7:21. Patriots 14–0. **Drive: 7 plays, 53 yards, 3:25.**

**Second quarter**

- NE – Nick Folk 39-yard field goal, 14:10. Patriots 17–0. **Drive: 8 plays, 41 yards, 2:38.**
- NYJ – Corey Davis 3-yard pass from Mike White (Matt Ammendola kick), 10:39. Patriots 17–7. **Drive: 6 plays, 69 yards, 3:31.**
- NE – Brandon Bolden 15-yard pass from Mac Jones (Nick Folk kick), 5:29. Patriots 24–7. **Drive: 12 plays, 73 yards, 5:10.**
- NE – Hunter Henry 1-yard pass from Mac Jones (Nick Folk kick), 0:27. Patriots 31–7. **Drive: 11 plays, 72 yards, 1:28.**

**Third quarter**

- NYJ – Elijah Moore 19-yard run (run failed), 11:38. Patriots 31–13. **Drive: 7 plays, 77 yards, 3:22.**
- NE – Nick Folk 50-yard field goal, 7:03. Patriots 34–13. **Drive: 9 plays, 43 yards, 4:35.**

**Fourth quarter**

- NE – Damien Harris 3-yard run (Nick Folk kick), 13:29. Patriots 41–13. **Drive: 5 plays, 43 yards, 2:39.**
- NE – J. J. Taylor 1-yard run (kick failed), 9:10. Patriots 47–13. **Drive: 4 plays, 53 yards, 2:04.**
- NE – J. J. Taylor 1-yard run (Nick Folk kick), 2:59. Patriots 54–13. **Drive: 9 plays, 78 yards, 3:43.**

**Top passers**

- NYJ – Mike White – 20/32, 202 yards, TD, 2 INT
- NE – Mac Jones – 24/36, 307 yards, 2 TD

**Top rushers**

- NYJ – Michael Carter – 11 rushes, 37 yards
- NE – Damien Harris – 14 rushes, 106 yards, 2 TD

**Top receivers**

- NYJ – Michael Carter – 8 receptions, 67 yards
- NE – Brandon Bolden – 6 receptions, 79 yards, TD

With the win, the Patriots improved to 3–4 and swept the Jets for the sixth consecutive season and improved the winning streak against the Jets to 12.

==== Week 8: at Los Angeles Chargers ====
Week 8: New England Patriots at Los Angeles Chargers – Game summary

Quarter	1	2	3	4	Total
**Patriots**	7	6	3	11	**27**
Chargers	7	7	3	7	**24**

at SoFi Stadium, Inglewood, California

- Date: October 31
- Game time: 4:05 p.m. EDT/1:05 p.m. PDT
- Game weather: None (retractable roof closed)
- Game attendance: 70,240
- Referee: Ronald Torbert
- TV announcers (CBS): Ian Eagle, Charles Davis and Evan Washburn
- Recap, Game Book

Game information

**First quarter**

- LAC – Austin Ekeler 5-yard run (Dustin Hopkins kick), 10:54. Chargers 7–0. **Drive: 8 plays, 75 yards, 4:06.**
- NE – Damien Harris 1-yard run (Nick Folk kick), 6:26. Tied 7–7. **Drive: 10 plays, 75 yards, 4:28.**

**Second quarter**

- LAC – Keenan Allen 5-yard pass from Justin Herbert (Dustin Hopkins kick), 12:35. Chargers 14–7. **Drive: 5 plays, 86 yards, 2:16.**
- NE – Nick Folk 24-yard field goal, 3:29. Chargers 14–10. **Drive: 9 plays, 30 yards, 3:22.**
- NE – Nick Folk 48-yard field goal, 0:10. Chargers 14–13. **Drive: 5 plays, 10 yards, 0:47.**

**Third quarter**

- NE – Nick Folk 48-yard field goal, 3:39. Patriots 16–14. **Drive: 10 plays, 31 yards, 5:09.**
- LAC – Dustin Hopkins 48-yard field goal, 0:39. Chargers 17–16. **Drive: 6 plays, 45 yards, 3:00.**

**Fourth quarter**

- NE – Adrian Phillips 26-yard interception return (Mac Jones-Jakobi Meyers pass), 10:11. Patriots 24–17.
- NE – Nick Folk 30-yard field goal, 2:19. Patriots 27–17. **Drive: 14 plays, 54 yards, 6:56.**
- LAC – Josh Palmer 24-yard pass from Justin Herbert (Dustin Hopkins kick), 0:40. Patriots 27–24. **Drive: 10 plays, 72 yards, 1:39.**

**Top passers**

- NE – Mac Jones – 18/35, 218 yards
- LAC – Justin Herbert – 18/35, 223 yards, 2 TD, 2 INT

**Top rushers**

- NE – Damien Harris – 23 rushes, 80 yards, TD
- LAC – Justin Jackson – 3 rushes, 79 yards

**Top receivers**

- NE – Nelson Agholor – 3 receptions, 60 yards
- LAC – Keenan Allen – 6 receptions, 77 yards, TD

This would be the Patriots' last win over the Chargers until 2025.

==== Week 9: at Carolina Panthers ====
Week 9: New England Patriots at Carolina Panthers – Game summary

Quarter	1	2	3	4	Total
**Patriots**	0	14	10	0	**24**
Panthers	0	6	0	0	**6**

at Bank of America Stadium, Charlotte, North Carolina

- Date: November 7
- Game time: 1:00 p.m. EST
- Game weather: Sunny, 61 °F (16 °C)
- Game attendance: 72,203
- Referee: Clete Blakeman
- TV announcers (CBS): Greg Gumbel, Adam Archuleta and AJ Ross
- Recap, Game Book

Game information

**First quarter**

- No scoring plays

**Second quarter**

- CAR – Zane Gonzalez 39-yard field goal, 12:07. Panthers 3–0. **Drive: 7 plays, 12 yards, 3:23.**
- NE – Damien Harris 3-yard run (Nick Folk kick), 8:19. Patriots 7–3. **Drive: 8 plays, 75 yards, 3:48.**
- CAR – Zane Gonzalez 49-yard field goal, 4:28. Patriots 7–6. **Drive: 6 plays, 3 yards, 1:54.**
- NE – Hunter Henry 7-yard pass from Mac Jones (Nick Folk kick), 0:24. Patriots 14–6. **Drive: 10 plays, 75 yards, 4:04.**

**Third quarter**

- NE – J. C. Jackson 88-yard interception return (Nick Folk kick), 6:55. Patriots 21–6.
- NE – Nick Folk 37-yard field goal, 2:20. Patriots 24–6. **Drive: 6 plays, 24 yards, 1:44.**

**Fourth quarter**

- No scoring plays

**Top passers**

- NE – Mac Jones – 12/18, 139 yards, TD, INT
- CAR – Sam Darnold – 16/33, 172 yards, 3 INT

**Top rushers**

- NE – Rhamondre Stevenson – 10 rushes, 62 yards
- CAR – Christian McCaffrey – 14 rushes, 52 yards

**Top receivers**

- NE – Rhamondre Stevenson – 2 receptions, 44 yards
- CAR – Christian McCaffrey – 4 receptions, 54 yards

The Patriots intercepted Panthers quarterback Sam Darnold three times en route to victory, including an 88-yard pick-six by J.C. Jackson. New England improved to 5–4 on the year and 4–0 all-time vs. Darnold. This was also the Patriots first win over the Panthers since 2009.

==== Week 10: vs. Cleveland Browns ====
Week 10: Cleveland Browns at New England Patriots – Game summary

Quarter	1	2	3	4	Total
Browns	7	0	0	0	**7**
**Patriots**	7	17	7	14	**45**

at Gillette Stadium, Foxborough, Massachusetts

- Date: November 14
- Game time: 1:00 p.m. EST
- Game weather: Cloudy, 48 °F (9 °C)
- Game attendance: 65,878
- Referee: John Hussey
- TV announcers (CBS): Ian Eagle, Charles Davis and Evan Washburn
- Recap, Game Book

Game information

**First quarter**

- CLE - Austin Hooper 2-yard pass from Baker Mayfield (Chase McLaughlin kick), 10:05. Browns 7–0. **Drive: 11 plays, 84 yards, 4:55.**
- NE – Hunter Henry 3-yard pass from Mac Jones (Nick Folk kick), 0:26. Tied 7–7. **Drive: 15 plays, 83 yards, 9:39.**

**Second quarter**

- NE – Rhamondre Stevenson 5-yard run (Nick Folk kick), 14:43. Patriots 14–7. **Drive: 1 play, 5 yards, 0:05.**
- NE – Kendrick Bourne 23-yard pass from Mac Jones (Nick Folk kick), 5:40. Patriots 21–7. **Drive: 11 plays, 99 yards, 6:11.**
- NE – Nick Folk 38-yard field goal, 0:17. Patriots 24–7. **Drive: 11 plays, 47 yards, 3:31.**

**Third quarter**

- NE – Rhamondre Stevenson 5-yard run (Nick Folk kick), 5:04. Patriots 31–7. **Drive: 8 plays, 92 yards, 5:06.**

**Fourth quarter**

- NE – Hunter Henry 3-yard pass from Mac Jones (Nick Folk kick), 13:33. Patriots 38–7. **Drive: 6 plays, 47 yards, 2:59.**
- NE – Jakobi Meyers 11-yard pass from Brian Hoyer (Nick Folk kick), 4:13. Patriots 45–7. **Drive: 6 plays, 92 yards, 4:02.**

**Top passers**

- CLE – Case Keenum – 8/12, 81 yards
- NE – Mac Jones – 19/23, 198 yards, 3 TD

**Top rushers**

- CLE – D'Ernest Johnson – 19 rushes, 99 yards
- NE – Rhamondre Stevenson – 20 rushes, 100 yards, 2 TD

**Top receivers**

- CLE – D'Ernest Johnson – 7 receptions, 58 yards
- NE – Kendrick Bourne – 4 receptions, 98 yards, TD

The Patriots outplayed the Browns on both sides of the ball. Mac Jones had one of his better games as a rookie, completing over 80 percent of his passes for three touchdowns and no interceptions as the Patriots converted 7 of 9 third downs. The defense only allowed points on the first drive of the game, held the Browns to 1 of 11 on third down, and knocked Browns quarterback Baker Mayfield out of the game in the third quarter. With Damien Harris sidelined with a concussion from the Panthers game, Rhamondre Stevenson served as the primary running back, rushing for 100 yards and two touchdowns. With the score 38–7 in the fourth quarter, Brian Hoyer replaced Jones and threw the pass that ended Jakobi Meyers' record touchdown drought.

This marked the Patriots' fourth win over the Browns since 2013.

==== Week 11: at Atlanta Falcons ====
Week 11: New England Patriots at Atlanta Falcons – Game summary

Quarter	1	2	3	4	Total
**Patriots**	3	10	0	12	**25**
Falcons	0	0	0	0	**0**

at Mercedes-Benz Stadium, Atlanta, Georgia

- Date: November 18
- Game time: 8:20 p.m. EST
- Game weather: None (retractable roof closed)
- Game attendance: 68,286
- Referee: Land Clark
- TV announcers (Fox/NFLN/Prime Video): Joe Buck, Troy Aikman, Erin Andrews and Kristina Pink
- Recap, Game Book

Game information

**First quarter**

- NE – Nick Folk 32-yard field goal, 5:14. Patriots 3–0. **Drive: 9 plays, 52 yards, 4:38.**

**Second quarter**

- NE – Nelson Agholor 19-yard pass from Mac Jones (Nick Folk kick), 13:44. Patriots 10–0. **Drive: 7 plays, 76 yards, 3:29.**
- NE – Nick Folk 44-yard field goal, 0:00. Patriots 13–0. **Drive: 7 plays, 41 yards, 1:48.**

**Third quarter**

- No scoring plays

**Fourth quarter**

- NE – Nick Folk 53-yard field goal, 6:39. Patriots 16–0. **Drive: 8 plays, 43 yards, 5:21.**
- NE – Nick Folk 33-yard field goal, 1:55. Patriots 19–0. **Drive: 8 plays, 35 yards, 3:14.**
- NE – Kyle Van Noy 35-yard interception return (kick failed, wide left), 1:22. Patriots 25–0.

**Top passers**

- NE – Mac Jones – 22/26, 207 yards, TD, INT
- ATL – Matt Ryan – 19/28, 153 yards, 2 INT

**Top rushers**

- NE – Rhamondre Stevenson – 12 rushes, 69 yards
- ATL – Qadree Ollison – 9 rushes, 34 yards

**Top receivers**

- NE – Kendrick Bourne – 4 receptions, 42 yards
- ATL – Russell Gage – 5 receptions, 49 yards

The New England defense intercepted all three Falcons quarterbacks—Matt Ryan, Josh Rosen, and Feleipe Franks—as the Patriots coasted to their 8th win over Atlanta since 2001 on Thursday Night Football.

==== Week 12: vs. Tennessee Titans ====
Week 12: Tennessee Titans at New England Patriots – Game summary

Quarter	1	2	3	4	Total
Titans	0	13	0	0	**13**
**Patriots**	7	9	10	10	**36**

at Gillette Stadium, Foxborough, Massachusetts

- Date: November 28
- Game time: 1:00 p.m. EST
- Game weather: Cloudy, 37 °F (3 °C)
- Game attendance: 65,878
- Referee: Alex Kemp
- TV announcers (CBS): Ian Eagle, Charles Davis and Evan Washburn
- Recap, Game Book

Game information

**First quarter**

- NE – Kendrick Bourne 4-yard pass from Mac Jones (Nick Folk kick), 7:37. Patriots 7–0. **Drive: 9 plays, 37 yards, 4:46.**

**Second quarter**

- TEN – Nick Westbrook-Ikhine 1-yard pass from Ryan Tannehill (kick failed), 14:28. Patriots 7–6. **Drive: 14 plays, 74 yards, 8:09.**
- NE – Nick Folk 22-yard field goal, 9:50. Patriots 10–6. **Drive: 8 plays, 75 yards, 4:38.**
- NE – Nick Folk 37-yard field goal, 3:04. Patriots 13–6. **Drive: 6 plays, 47 yards, 2:57.**
- NE – Nick Folk 44-yard field goal, 0:58. Patriots 16–6. **Drive: 6 plays, 42 yards, 0:53.**
- TEN – Dontrell Hilliard 68-yard run (Randy Bullock kick), 0:37. Patriots 16–13. **Drive: 3 plays, 75 yards, 0:21.**

**Third quarter**

- NE – Nick Folk 28-yard field goal, 11:13. Patriots 19–13. **Drive: 8 plays, 39 yards, 3:47.**
- NE – Kendrick Bourne 41-yard pass from Mac Jones (Nick Folk kick), 5:01. Patriots 26–13. **Drive: 4 plays, 56 yards, 1:43.**

**Fourth quarter**

- NE – Nick Folk 52-yard field goal, 6:09. Patriots 29–13. **Drive: 10 plays, 46 yards, 5:50.**
- NE – Damien Harris 14-yard run (Nick Folk kick), 4:38. Patriots 36–13. **Drive: 2 plays, 21 yards, 0:48.**

**Top passers**

- TEN – Ryan Tannehill – 11/21, 93 yards, TD, INT
- NE – Mac Jones – 23/32, 310 yards, 2 TD

**Top rushers**

- TEN – Dontrell Hilliard – 12 rushes, 131 yards, TD
- NE – Rhamondre Stevenson – 9 rushes, 46 yards

**Top receivers**

- TEN – Nick Westbrook-Ikhine – 2 receptions, 25 yards, TD
- NE – Jakobi Meyers – 5 receptions, 98 yards

The Patriots defense put up a show against a banged up Titans team. The offense was only forced to punt once but struggled to finish drives and get the run game going, resulting in five Nick Folk field goals. Mac Jones threw for 310 yards, and completed a pair of touchdown passes to Kendrick Bourne, with Damien Harris adding a touchdown late in the fourth quarter on the ground. Cornerback J. C. Jackson secured his seventh interception of the season, while the rest of the defense forced five fumbles, three of which were recovered by the Patriots. The Patriots improved to 8–4 for the AFC East division lead and an overall second place in the AFC.

==== Week 13: at Buffalo Bills ====
Week 13: New England Patriots at Buffalo Bills – Game summary

Quarter	1	2	3	4	Total
**Patriots**	8	3	0	3	**14**
Bills	7	0	3	0	**10**

at Highmark Stadium, Orchard Park, New York

- Date: December 6
- Game time: 8:15 p.m. EST
- Game weather: Cloudy, 36 °F (2 °C)
- Game attendance: 69,694
- Referee: Bill Vinovich
- TV announcers (ESPN): Steve Levy, Brian Griese, Louis Riddick, and Lisa Salters
- Recap, Game Book

Game information

**First quarter**

- NE – Damien Harris 64-yard run (Brandon Bolden run), 5:18. Patriots 8–0. **Drive: 3 plays, 69 yards, 1:37.**
- BUF – Gabe Davis 14-yard pass from Josh Allen (Tyler Bass kick), 2:02. Patriots 8–7. **Drive: 1 play, 14 yards, 0:05.**

**Second quarter**

- NE – Nick Folk 41-yard field goal, 11:28. Patriots 11–7. **Drive: 9 plays, 52 yards, 5:34.**

**Third quarter**

- BUF – Tyler Bass 35-yard field goal, 6:35. Patriots 11–10. **Drive: 8 plays, 46 yards, 2:40.**

**Fourth quarter**

- NE – Nick Folk 34-yard field goal, 13:01. Patriots 14–10. **Drive: 14 plays, 59 yards, 8:34.**

**Top passers**

- NE – Mac Jones – 2/3, 19 yards
- BUF – Josh Allen – 15/30, 145 yards, TD

**Top rushers**

- NE – Damien Harris – 10 rushes, 111 yards, TD
- BUF – Josh Allen – 6 rushes, 39 yards

**Top receivers**

- NE – Jonnu Smith – 1 reception, 12 yards
- BUF – Stefon Diggs – 4 receptions, 51 yards

The Patriots entered the game in first place in the AFC following the Baltimore Ravens' loss the previous day, and were playing for first place in the AFC East. The game was impacted by 40 mph (64 km/h) winds; Belichick noted after the game that the winds in the Patriots' Week 17 game in Buffalo in 2008 were "way worse".

The Patriots drew up a run-heavy game plan in which Jones attempted just three passes, completing two for 19 yards (in 2008, Cassel completed six of eight passes for 78 yards). The Patriots ran the ball 46 times, for over 220 yards, utilizing a sixth offensive lineman on the majority of their offensive snaps. The three pass attempts were the fewest in a game since 1974 (when the Bills attempted just two in a game), the fewest in franchise history, and the fewest by a winning team in 30 years.

The Patriots defense was also stout: the Bills' only touchdown came after a N'Keal Harry muffed punt, and Myles Bryant broke up a fourth-down pass in the red zone late in the fourth quarter to preserve the Patriots' 14–10 win.

The Patriots had their bye week after this game, making it their latest regular-season bye since their Week 16 bye in 2001. This would mark the Patriots last win in Buffalo until 2025.

==== Week 15: at Indianapolis Colts ====
Week 15: New England Patriots at Indianapolis Colts – Game summary

Quarter	1	2	3	4	Total
Patriots	0	0	0	17	**17**
**Colts**	14	3	3	7	**27**

at Lucas Oil Stadium, Indianapolis, Indiana

- Date: December 18
- Game time: 8:20 p.m. EST
- Game weather: None (retractable roof closed)
- Game attendance: 67,391
- Referee: Carl Cheffers
- TV announcers (NFLN): Kevin Burkhardt, Greg Olsen, Pam Oliver and Kristina Pink
- Recap, Game Book

Game information

**First quarter**

- IND – Nyheim Hines 8-yard pass from Carson Wentz (Michael Badgley kick), 3:53. Colts 7–0. **Drive: 8 plays, 78 yards, 4:58.**
- IND – E. J. Speed blocked punt recovery in end zone (Michael Badgley kick), 0:14. Colts 14–0.

**Second quarter**

- IND – Michael Badgley 25-yard field goal, 4:31. Colts 17–0. **Drive: 14 plays, 58 yards, 8:57.**

**Third quarter**

- IND – Michael Badgley 41-yard field goal, 11:49. Colts 20–0. **Drive: 4 plays, −3 yards, 1:49.**

**Fourth quarter**

- NE – Hunter Henry 12-yard pass from Mac Jones (Nick Folk kick), 14:55. Colts 20–7. **Drive: 9 plays, 61 yards, 4:38.**
- NE – Nick Folk 25-yard field goal, 8:57. Colts 20–10. **Drive: 12 plays, 46 yards, 4:28.**
- NE – Hunter Henry 7-yard pass from Mac Jones (Nick Folk kick), 2:21. Colts 20–17. **Drive: 7 plays, 82 yards, 1:27.**
- IND – Jonathan Taylor 67-yard run (Michael Badgley kick), 2:01. Colts 27–17. **Drive: 2 plays, 69 yards, 0:20.**

**Top passers**

- NE – Mac Jones – 26/45, 299 yards, 2 TD, 2 INT
- IND – Carson Wentz – 5/12, 57 yards, TD, INT

**Top rushers**

- NE – Rhamondre Stevenson – 10 rushes, 36 yards
- IND – Jonathan Taylor– 29 rushes, 170 yards, TD

**Top receivers**

- NE – Hunter Henry – 6 receptions, 77 yards, 2 TD
- IND – Zach Pascal – 1 reception, 23 yards

The Patriots were flat for much of the game, being shut out in the first half for the first time in 99 games. A late second half comeback brought the Patriots to within three points, but fell short when Jonathan Taylor put the game away with a 67-yard touchdown run. With the loss, the Patriots fell to the #3 seed in the AFC prior to Week 15's Sunday games, while still maintaining first place in the AFC East. It was also the first time the Patriots lost to the Colts since Week 10 of the 2009 season. The Patriots gave up 226 rush yards in the loss.

==== Week 16: vs. Buffalo Bills ====
Week 16: Buffalo Bills at New England Patriots – Game summary

Quarter	1	2	3	4	Total
**Bills**	7	10	3	13	**33**
Patriots	0	7	7	7	**21**

at Gillette Stadium, Foxborough, Massachusetts

- Date: December 26
- Game time: 1:00 p.m. EST
- Game weather: Cloudy, 37 °F (3 °C)
- Game attendance: 65,878
- Referee: Shawn Smith
- TV announcers (CBS): Ian Eagle, Charles Davis, and Evan Washburn
- Recap, Game Book

Game information

**First quarter**

- BUF – Isaiah McKenzie 3-yard pass from Josh Allen (Tyler Bass kick), 6:37. Bills 7–0. **Drive: 13 plays, 61 yards, 6:57.**

**Second quarter**

- NE – Damien Harris 16-yard run (Nick Folk kick), 14:28. Tied 7–7. **Drive: 13 plays, 75 yards, 7:09.**
- BUF – Tyler Bass 25-yard field goal, 9:01. Bills 10–7. **Drive: 10 plays, 68 yards, 5:27.**
- BUF – Stefon Diggs 12-yard pass from Josh Allen (Tyler Bass kick), 1:45. Bills 17–7. **Drive: 7 plays, 42 yards, 1:25.**

**Third quarter**

- BUF – Tyler Bass 34-yard field goal, 9:02. Bills 20–7. **Drive: 14 plays, 64 yards, 5:58.**
- NE – Damien Harris 1-yard run (Nick Folk kick), 1:41. Bills 20–14. **Drive: 14 plays, 75 yards, 7:21.**

**Fourth quarter**

- BUF – Devin Singletary 2-yard run (pass failed), 11:42. Bills 26–14. **Drive: 9 plays, 66 yards, 4:59.**
- NE – Damien Harris 8-yard run (Nick Folk kick), 7:37. Bills 26–21. **Drive: 10 plays, 75 yards, 4:05.**
- BUF – Dawson Knox 2-yard pass from Josh Allen (Tyler Bass kick), 2:30. Bills 33–21. **Drive: 13 plays, 75 yards, 5:07.**

**Top passers**

- NE – Mac Jones – 14/32, 145 yards, 2 INT
- BUF – Josh Allen – 30/47, 314 yards, 3 TD

**Top rushers**

- NE – Damien Harris – 18 rushes, 103 yards, 3 TD
- BUF – Josh Allen – 12 rushes, 64 yards

**Top receivers**

- NE – Jakobi Meyers – 6 receptions, 59 yards
- BUF – Isaiah McKenzie – 11 receptions, 125 yards, TD

==== Week 17: vs. Jacksonville Jaguars ====
Week 17: Jacksonville Jaguars at New England Patriots – Game summary

Quarter	1	2	3	4	Total
Jaguars	3	0	0	7	**10**
**Patriots**	7	21	13	9	**50**

at Gillette Stadium, Foxborough, Massachusetts

- Date: January 2
- Game time: 1:00 p.m. EST
- Game weather: Cloudy, 46 °F (8 °C)
- Game attendance: 65,878
- Referee: Adrian Hill
- TV announcers (CBS): Andrew Catalon, James Lofton and Sherree Burress
- Recap, Game Book

Game information

**First quarter**

- NE – Damien Harris 2-yard run (Nick Folk kick), 5:49. Patriots 7–0. **Drive: 11 plays, 70 yards, 7:03.**
- JAX – Matthew Wright 29-yard field goal, 2:18. Patriots 7–3. **Drive: 8 plays, 66 yards, 3:31.**

**Second quarter**

- NE – Damien Harris 7-yard run (Nick Folk kick), 12:02. Patriots 14–3. **Drive: 9 plays, 66 yards, 5:16.**
- NE – Kristian Wilkerson 6-yard pass from Mac Jones (Nick Folk kick), 4:40. Patriots 21–3. **Drive: 7 plays, 33 yards, 3:37.**
- NE – Jakobi Meyers 4-yard pass from Mac Jones (Nick Folk kick), 0:48. Patriots 28–3. **Drive: 6 plays, 43 yards, 1:11.**

**Third quarter**

- NE – Kristian Wilkerson 20-yard pass from Mac Jones (kick blocked), 11:14. Patriots 34–3. **Drive: 6 plays, 77 yards, 3:46.**
- NE – Rhamondre Stevenson 1-yard run (Nick Folk kick), 2:42. Patriots 41–3. **Drive: 1 play, 1 yard, 0:03.**

**Fourth quarter**

- NE – Nick Folk 43-yard field goal, 11:46. Patriots 44–3. **Drive: 11 plays, 53 yards, 4:28.**
- NE – Rhamondre Stevenson 6-yard run (run failed), 7:07. Patriots 50–3. **Drive: 7 plays, 74 yards, 3:46.**
- JAX – Dare Ogunbowale 28-yard pass from Trevor Lawrence (Matthew Wright kick), 3:48. Patriots 50–10. **Drive: 8 plays, 75 yards, 3:19.**

**Top passers**

- JAX – Trevor Lawrence – 17/27, 193 yards, TD, 3 INT
- NE – Mac Jones – 22/30, 227 yards, 3 TD

**Top rushers**

- JAX – Dare Ogunbowale – 9 rushes, 36 yards
- NE – Rhamondre Stevenson – 19 rushes, 107 yards, 2 TD

**Top receivers**

- JAX – Laquon Treadwell – 6 receptions, 87 yards
- NE – Kendrick Bourne – 5 receptions, 76 yards

With the blowout win, alongside the Titan's win over the Dolphins, the Patriots clinched their 12th playoff berth in 13 years This marked their last playoff berth until 2025.

==== Week 18: at Miami Dolphins ====
Week 18: New England Patriots at Miami Dolphins – Game summary

Quarter	1	2	3	4	Total
Patriots	0	7	3	14	**24**
**Dolphins**	14	3	7	9	**33**

at Hard Rock Stadium, Miami Gardens, Florida

- Date: January 9
- Game time: 4:25 p.m. EST
- Game weather: Cloudy, 76 °F (24 °C)
- Game attendance: 66,514
- Referee: Alex Kemp
- TV announcers (CBS): Spero Dedes, Jay Feely and Jenny Dell
- Recap, Game Book

Game information

**First quarter**

- MIA – Jaylen Waddle 7-yard pass from Tua Tagovailoa (Jason Sanders kick), 7:34. Dolphins 7–0. **Drive: 13 plays, 77 yards, 7:26.**
- MIA – Xavien Howard 37-yard interception return (Jason Sanders kick), 6:07. Dolphins 14–0.

**Second quarter**

- MIA – Jason Sanders 30-yard field goal 11:09. Dolphins 17–0. **Drive: 15 plays, 77 yards, 6:58.**
- NE – Brandon Bolden 15-yard run (Nick Folk kick), 7:36. Dolphins 17–7. **Drive: 7 plays, 74 yards, 3:33.**

**Third quarter**

- NE – Nick Folk 43-yard field goal 8:27. Dolphins 17–10. **Drive: 13 plays, 50 yards, 6:33.**
- MIA – Duke Johnson 1-yard run (Jason Sanders kick), 4:31. Dolphins 24–10. **Drive: 8 plays, 75 yards, 3:56.**

**Fourth quarter**

- MIA – Jason Sanders 49-yard field goal 10:55. Dolphins 27–10. **Drive: 10 plays, 45 yards, 6:30.**
- NE – Brandon Bolden 18-yard pass from Mac Jones (Nick Folk kick), 6:32. Dolphins 27–17. **Drive: 10 plays, 75 yards, 4:23.**
- NE – Damien Harris 1-yard run (Nick Folk kick), 2:53. Dolphins 27–24. **Drive: 6 plays, 76 yards, 1:56.**
- MIA – Sam Eguavoen 0-yard fumble return, 0:00. Dolphins 33–24.

**Top passers**

- NE – Mac Jones – 20/30, 261 yards, TD, INT
- MIA – Tua Tagovailoa – 15/22, 109 yards, TD

**Top rushers**

- NE – Brandon Bolden – 7 rushes, 46 yards, TD
- MIA – Duke Johnson – 25 rushes, 117 yards, TD

**Top receivers**

- NE – Hunter Henry – 5 receptions, 86 yards
- MIA – Durham Smythe – 2 receptions, 32 yards

With the loss, the Patriots not only failed to defeat the Dolphins for the first time since 2020 but also failed to clinch the AFC East for the second season in a row following the Bills' win over the Jets. Instead, the Patriots clinched the #6 seed following Raiders' win.

=== Standings ===
==== Division ====
AFC East
	W	L	T	PCT	DIV	CONF	PF	PA	STK
^{(3)} Buffalo Bills	11	6	0	.647	5–1	7–5	483	289	W4
^{(6)} New England Patriots	10	7	0	.588	3–3	8–4	462	303	L1
Miami Dolphins	9	8	0	.529	4–2	6–6	341	373	W1
New York Jets	4	13	0	.235	0–6	4–8	310	504	L2

==== Conference ====
AFC
#	Team	Division	W	L	T	PCT	DIV	CONF	SOS	SOV	STK
**Division winners**
1 (Note: Tennessee finished ahead of Kansas City based on head-to-head victory, claiming the No. 1 seed.)	Tennessee Titans	South	12	5	0	.706	5–1	8–4	.472	.480	W3
2	Kansas City Chiefs	West	12	5	0	.706	5–1	7–5	.538	.517	W1
3	Buffalo Bills	East	11	6	0	.647	5–1	7–5	.472	.428	W4
4	Cincinnati Bengals	North	10	7	0	.588	4–2	8–4	.472	.462	L1
**Wild cards**
5 (Note: Las Vegas claimed the No. 5 seed over New England based on win percentage in common games (5–1 vs. 2–4 against: Miami, Dallas, LA Chargers, Cleveland, and Indianapolis).)	Las Vegas Raiders	West	10	7	0	.588	3–3	8–4	.510	.515	W4
6	New England Patriots	East	10	7	0	.588	3–3	8–4	.481	.394	L1
7	Pittsburgh Steelers	North	9	7	1	.559	4–2	7–5	.521	.490	W2
**Did not qualify for the postseason**
8 (Note: Indianapolis finished ahead of Miami and Los Angeles based on conference record (7–5 vs. 6–6).)	Indianapolis Colts	South	9	8	0	.529	3–3	7–5	.495	.431	L2
9 (Note: Miami finished ahead of LA Chargers based on win percentage in common games (5–1 vs. 2–4 against: New England, Las Vegas, Houston, Baltimore, and NY Giants).)	Miami Dolphins	East	9	8	0	.529	4–2	6–6	.464	.379	W1
10	Los Angeles Chargers	West	9	8	0	.529	3–3	6–6	.510	.500	L1
11 (Note: Cleveland finished ahead of Baltimore based on division record (3–3 vs. 1–5).)	Cleveland Browns	North	8	9	0	.471	3–3	5–7	.514	.415	W1
12	Baltimore Ravens	North	8	9	0	.471	1–5	5–7	.531	.460	L6
13	Denver Broncos	West	7	10	0	.412	1–5	3–9	.484	.357	L4
14 (Note: NY Jets finished ahead of Houston based on head-to-head victory.)	New York Jets	East	4	13	0	.235	0–6	4–8	.512	.426	L2
15	Houston Texans	South	4	13	0	.235	3–3	4–8	.498	.397	L2
16	Jacksonville Jaguars	South	3	14	0	.176	1–5	3–9	.512	.569	W1
**Tiebreakers** (Note: When breaking ties for three or more teams under the NFL's rules, they are first broken within divisions, then comparing only the highest-ranked remaining team from each division.)

== Postseason ==
=== Schedule ===
Round	Date	Opponent (seed)	Result	Record	Venue	Recap
Wild Card	January 15	at Buffalo Bills (3)	L 17-47	0–1	Highmark Stadium	Recap

=== Game summaries ===
==== AFC Wild Card Playoffs: at (3) Buffalo Bills ====
AFC Wild Card Playoffs: (6) New England Patriots at (3) Buffalo Bills – Game summary

Quarter	1	2	3	4	Total
Patriots	0	3	7	7	17
Bills	14	13	6	14	47

at Highmark Stadium, Orchard Park, New York

- Date: January 15, 2022
- Game time: 8:15 p.m. EST
- Game weather: Clear, 7 °F (−14 °C)
- Game attendance: 69,188
- Referee: Brad Allen
- TV announcers (CBS): Ian Eagle, Charles Davis, and Evan Washburn
- Recap, Game Book

Game information

First quarter

- BUF – Dawson Knox 8-yard pass from Josh Allen (Tyler Bass kick), 9:45. Bills 7–0. Drive: 9 plays, 70 yards, 5:15.
- BUF – Dawson Knox 11-yard pass from Josh Allen (Tyler Bass kick), 0:40. Bills 14–0. Drive: 10 plays, 80 yards, 5:00.

Second quarter

- BUF – Devin Singletary 3-yard run (kick blocked), 7:20. Bills 20–0. Drive: 10 plays, 81 yards, 6:03.
- BUF – Devin Singletary 16-yard run (Tyler Bass kick), 1:53 . Bills 27–0. Drive: 4 plays, 89 yards, 1:51.
- NE – Nick Folk 44-yard field goal, 0:01. Bills 27–3. Drive: 10 plays, 49 yards, 1:52.

Third quarter

- BUF – Emmanuel Sanders 34-yard pass from Josh Allen (kick blocked), 8:48. Bills 33–3. Drive: 6 plays, 58 yards, 4:05.
- NE – Kendrick Bourne 3-yard pass from Mac Jones (Nick Folk kick), 4:12. Bills 33–10. Drive: 11 plays, 75 yards, 4:36.

Fourth quarter

- BUF – Gabe Davis 19-yard pass from Josh Allen (Tyler Bass kick), 13:22. Bills 40–10. Drive: 9 plays, 77 yards, 5:50.
- BUF – Tommy Doyle 1-yard pass from Josh Allen (Tyler Bass kick), 8:37. Bills 47–10. Drive: 3 plays, 39 yards, 1:36.
- NE – Kendrick Bourne 4-yard pass from Mac Jones (Nick Folk kick), 1:44. Bills 47–17. Drive: 15 plays, 75 yards, 6:53.

Top passers

- NE – Mac Jones – 24/38, 232 yards, 2 TD, 2 INT
- BUF – Josh Allen – 21/25, 308 yards, 5 TD

Top rushers

- NE – Damien Harris – 9 rushes, 30 yards
- BUF – Devin Singletary – 16 rushes, 81 yards, 2 TD

Top receivers

- NE – Kendrick Bourne – 7 receptions, 77 yards, 2 TD
- BUF – Dawson Knox – 5 receptions, 89 yards, 2 TD

In New England's first playoff game since the departure of quarterback Tom Brady, they were unable to stop the Bills and quarterback Josh Allen defensively, with the Bills being the first team in NFL history to never punt, kick a field goal or turn the ball over on any of their drives (every Buffalo offensive possession ended in a touchdown or was the end of the game). It was the New England Patriots' worst playoff loss since Super Bowl XX.

== Statistics ==
=== Team ===
Category	Total yards	Yards per game	NFL rank (out of 32)
Passing offense	3,857	226.9	14th
Rushing offense	2,151	126.5	8th
Total offense	6,008	353.4	15th
Passing defense	3,181	187.1	2nd
Rushing defense	2,103	123.7	22nd
Total defense	5,284	310.8	4th

=== Individual ===
Category	Player	Total yards
Offense
Passing yards	Mac Jones	3,801
Passing touchdowns	Mac Jones	22
Rushing	Damien Harris	929
Rushing touchdowns	Damien Harris	15
Receiving yards	Jakobi Meyers	866
Receiving touchdowns	Hunter Henry	9
Defense
Tackles (Solo)	Kyle Dugger	70
Sacks	Matthew Judon	12.5
Interceptions	J. C. Jackson	8

Statistics correct as of the end of the 2021 NFL season
