= Christian Barmore =

American football player (born 1999)

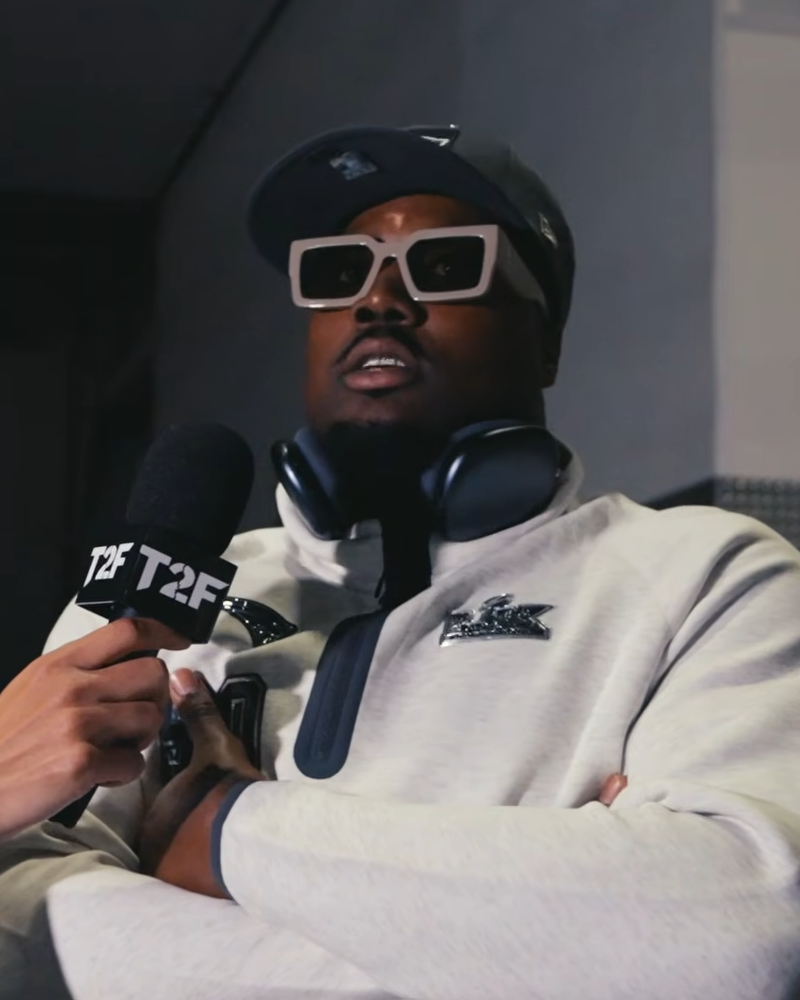
- Barmore in 2026

No. 90 – New England Patriots
- Position: Defensive tackle
- Roster status: Active

Personal information
- Born: July 28, 1999 (age 27); Philadelphia, Pennsylvania, U.S.
- Listed height: 6 ft 5 in (1.96 m)
- Listed weight: 315 lb (143 kg)

Career information
- High school: Neumann Goretti (Philadelphia)
- College: Alabama (2018–2020)
- NFL draft: 2021: 2nd round, 38th overall pick

Career history
- New England Patriots (2021–present)

Awards and highlights
- PFWA All-Rookie Team (2021); CFP national champion (2020); CFP National Championship Game Defensive MVP (2021); First-team All-SEC (2020)

Career NFL statistics as of Week 1, 2026
- Total tackles: 169
- Sacks: 15.5
- Forced fumbles: 1
- Pass deflections: 9
- Stats at Pro Football Reference

Christian Barmore (born July 28, 1999) is an American professional football defensive tackle for the New England Patriots of the National Football League (NFL). He played college football for the Alabama Crimson Tide and was selected by the Patriots in the second round of the 2021 NFL draft.

== Early life ==
Barmore grew up in Philadelphia, Pennsylvania, and attended Abraham Lincoln High School his freshman year before transferring to Saints John Neumann and Maria Goretti Catholic High School. Barmore originally verbally committed to play college football for the Temple Owls during the summer going into his senior year, but de-committed and reopened his recruitment. Barmore ultimately signed to play at Alabama over offers from Baylor, Florida, Georgia, and LSU.

== College career ==
Barmore redshirted his true freshman season. As a redshirt freshman, he played in 12 games and made 26 tackles, including six tackles for loss and two sacks and was named to the SEC All-Freshman team. Barmore was named first-team All-SEC as a redshirt sophomore, finishing the season with 37 total tackles, 9.5 tackles for loss, and eight sacks with three forced fumbles and three passes defended. He was named the Defensive MVP of the 2021 College Football Playoff National Championship game after making five tackles, including two for a loss and one sack in Alabama's 52-24 win over Ohio State. Following the national title game, Barmore announced that he would forgo his remaining two years of eligibility and enter the 2021 NFL draft.

== Professional career ==
Pre-draft measurables
Height	Weight	Arm length	Hand span	Wingspan	40-yard dash	10-yard split	20-yard split	20-yard shuttle	Three-cone drill
6 ft 4 1/8 in (1.93 m)	310 lb (141 kg)	33 5/8 in (0.85 m)	10 in (0.25 m)	6 ft 9 3/8 in (2.07 m)	4.98 s	1.76 s	2.88 s	4.75 s	7.81 s
All values from Pro Day

Barmore was selected by the New England Patriots in the second round (38th overall) of the 2021 NFL draft. Barmore was the first defensive tackle selected. He signed his four-year rookie contract, worth $8.5 million, on July 21, 2021. He played in all 17 games and was named to the PFWA All-Rookie Team.

On November 18, 2022, Barmore was placed on injured reserve. He was activated on December 17. He played in ten games in the 2022 season. He had 2.5 sacks, 23 total tackles, and one pass defended. In Week 16 of the 2023 season, he had three sacks against the Denver Broncos. In the 2023 season, he had 8.5 sacks, 64 total tackles, and six passes defended.

On April 29, 2024, Barmore signed a four-year contract extension with the Patriots worth up to $92 million. This made him the highest paid player in New England Patriots history, not named Tom Brady. On July 28, Barmore was diagnosed with blood clots, rendering him out indefinitely. He was placed on the reserve/non-football injury list to begin the season. He was activated on November 16. On December 19, he was placed back on the reserve/non-football injury list due to "recurring symptoms". He appeared in four games in the 2024 season. He recorded one sack, which came in Week 12 against the Dolphins.

In the 2025 season, Barmore had two sacks and 29 total tackles in 17 games. He recorded a sack in the AFC Championship, a 10–7 win over the Denver Broncos. In Super Bowl LX, he had three total tackles in the 29–13 loss to the Seahawks.

== Personal life ==
Barmore has one daughter. In March 2026, it was revealed his then-girlfriend of three and half years, and the daughter's mother, was pregnant with another child at the time Barmore reportedly assaulted her in August 2025. As of March 2026, Barmore and this woman still remained in contact.

=== Legal issues ===
In March 2026, it was revealed that police had previously responded to a service call from Barmore's residence in June 2022.

In October 2024, Barmore was pulled over in Providence, Rhode Island for an expired license plate registration. An officer had noticed window tint on his vehicle and a plate cover that didn’t allow clear viewing of a temporary registration plate. Despite initially pursuing Barmore's vehicle for a minor traffic-related offense, the pursuing officer, who had in fact started pursuing Barmore at the intersection of Elmwood Avenue and Parkis Avenue, was described as needing to have "slow-rolled" in order to successfully pull Barmore over in front of 343 Broad St. Barmore was also described as having "had an attitude" after making contact with officer who pulled him over. Having had suspicious behavior in an area which known for "high narcotic usage," police would afterwards search Barmore's car, which led to Barmore accusing the local police of being both "unprofessional" and racist. However, Barmore would soon afterwards apologize to the Providence Police Department for his remarks.

On December 31, 2025, it was reported that Barmore was accused of one count of assault and battery on a family/household member. The charge, which is a misdemeanor charge, stems from an incident on August 8, 2025. The accuser claimed that Barmore had become angry about the air conditioning temperature in his bedroom and over food. According to court documents, the victim told police Barmore grabbed her phone from her hands while she was trying to leave the house, threw her to the ground as she tried to leave, and grabbed her by the shirt "in the area of the neck" as she tried to get up, but he eventually let her go. A criminal complaint was issued on December 16, 2025, and he was scheduled for an arraignment on February 3, 2026, five days before Super Bowl LX, but was later postponed to March 9, 2026. A statement released by Barmore's lawyer saying “the evidence will demonstrate that no criminal conduct took place". Despite the lawyer's claim, it was acknowledged that the victim, who soon afterwards fled to Delaware with their daughter, had in fact somehow got bruises, which she later took photos of and sent to police officers. During his arraignment at Attleboro District Court on March 9, prosecutors would drop the domestic assault charges against Barmore after determining that this case Barmore was now no longer viable after they failed to receive any new information from the alleged victim.

== NFL career statistics ==
Legend
**Bold**	Career high

=== Regular season ===
Year	Team	Games		Tackles						Interceptions					Fumbles			
Year	Team	GP	GS	Cmb	Solo	Ast	TfL	Sck	Sfty	Int	Yds	Lng	TD	PD	FF	FR	Yds	TD
2021	NE	**17**	2	46	23	23	3	1.5	0	0	0	0.0	0	2	0	0	0	0
2022	NE	10	3	23	12	11	2	2.5	0	0	0	0.0	0	1	0	0	0	0
2023	NE	**17**	6	**64**	**39**	**25**	**13**	**8.5**	0	0	0	0.0	0	**6**	**1**	0	0	0
2024	NE	4	0	6	6	0	1	1.0	0	0	0	0.0	0	0	0	0	0	0
2025	NE	**17**	**16**	29	15	14	4	2.0	0	0	0	0	0	0	0	0	0	0
2026	NE	1	0	1	1	0	0	0.0	0	0	0	0.0	0	0	0	0	0	0
Career		66	27	169	96	73	23	15.5	0	0	0	0.0	0	9	1	0	0	0

=== Postseason ===
Year	Team	Games		Tackles						Interceptions					Fumbles			
Year	Team	GP	GS	Cmb	Solo	Ast	TfL	Sck	Sfty	Int	Yds	Lng	TD	PD	FF	FR	Yds	TD
2021	NE	1	0	2	1	1	0	0.0	0	0	0	0.0	0	0	0	0	0	0
2025	NE	4	4	10	6	4	2	1.0	0	0	0	0	0	0	0	0	0	0
Career		5	4	12	7	5	2	1.0	0	0	0	0.0	0	0	0	0	0	0
