= Justin Bethel =

American football player (born 1990)

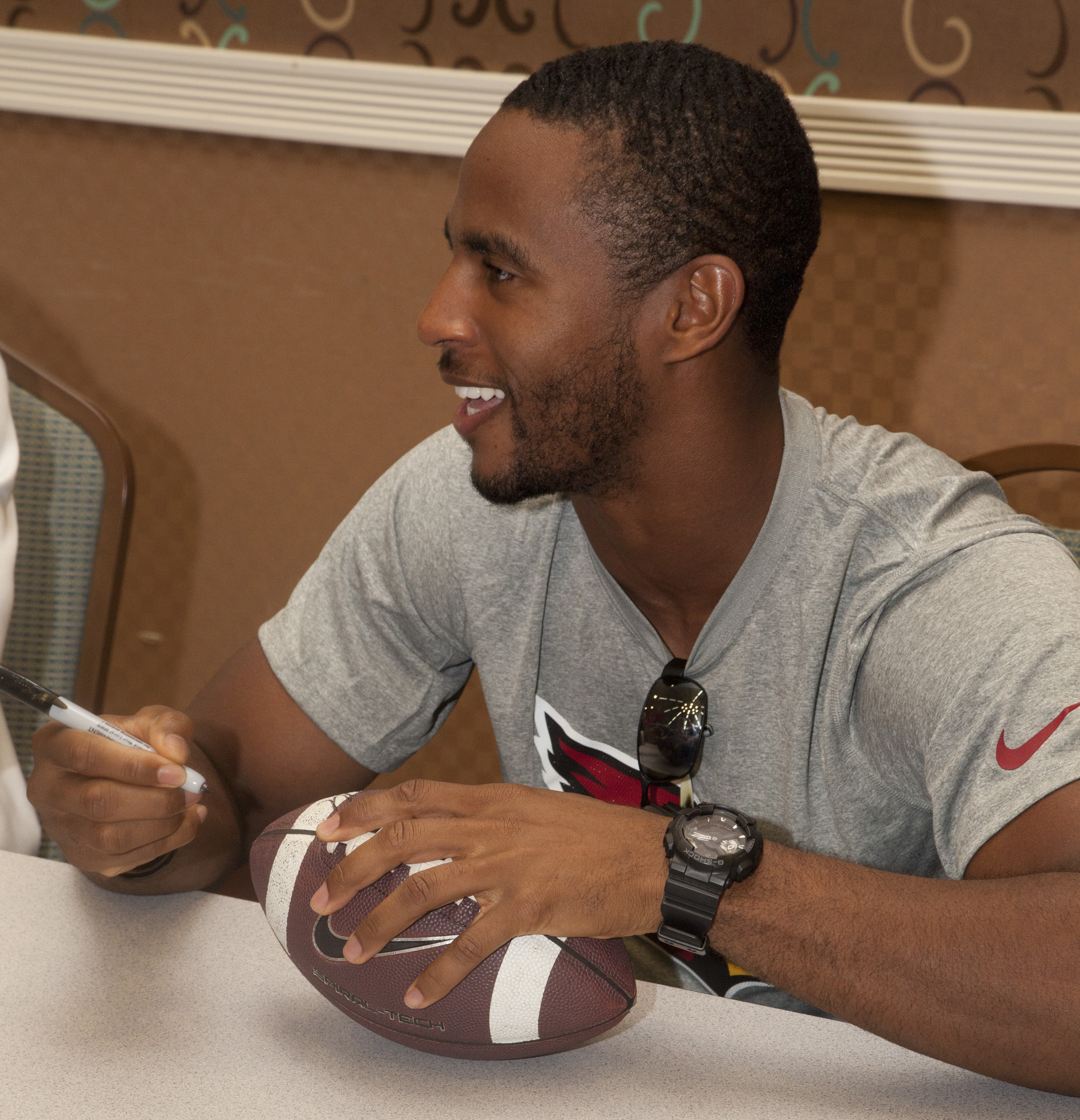
- Bethel in 2014

No. 31, 28, 29, 20
- Positions: Cornerback, special teamer

Personal information
- Born: June 17, 1990 (age 36); Sumter, South Carolina, U.S.
- Listed height: 6 ft 0 in (1.83 m)
- Listed weight: 195 lb (88 kg)

Career information
- High school: Blythewood (Blythewood, South Carolina)
- College: Presbyterian (2008–2011)
- NFL draft: 2012: 6th round, 177th overall pick

Career history
- Arizona Cardinals (2012–2017); Atlanta Falcons (2018); Baltimore Ravens (2019); New England Patriots (2019–2021); Miami Dolphins (2022–2023)

Awards and highlights
- 2× First-team All-Pro (2013, 2015); 3× Pro Bowl (2013–2015); 3× Second-team All-Big South (2009–2011)

Career NFL statistics
- Total tackles: 282
- Sacks: 0.5
- Forced fumbles: 5
- Fumble recoveries: 8
- Pass deflections: 25
- Interceptions: 5
- Defensive touchdowns: 3
- Stats at Pro Football Reference

Justin Andrew Bethel (born June 17, 1990) is an American former professional football player who was a cornerback and special teamer in the National Football League (NFL). He played college football for the Presbyterian Blue Hose and was selected by the Arizona Cardinals in the sixth round of the 2012 NFL draft.

== Early life ==
Bethel was born in Sumter, South Carolina, and at age 6 he moved with his family to Columbia. He started playing football at age 11 when he was in sixth grade. He attended Blythewood High School where in 2007 he was named Blythewood's Defensive Player of the Year and Most Improved Defensive Player. He helped the team win the State Championship in 2006.

== College career ==
Bethel did not receive much interest from college football programs, and he planned to study culinary arts at Johnson & Wales University, until his high school coach, future Clemson co-offensive coordinator and USF head coach Jeff Scott, was hired to be a coach for the Presbyterian Blue Hose. Bethel decided to attend Presbyterian, and majored in Business Administration.

Bethel played in 12 games during his freshman season in 2008, amassing 54 tackles and 37 solo tackles. He had two interceptions and two blocked kicks. 2009 was a breakout season for Bethel. He had a team-best 79 tackles during 11 games, 55 of which were solo. He blocked 3 kicks, two in a game against the Gardner–Webb Runnin' Bulldogs. He also forced one fumble and had 4.5 tackles for a loss. For his efforts, he was named to the Big South Conference all-conference second-team defensive squad.

== Professional career ==
=== Pre-draft ===
Bethel caught the attention of pro scouts with a strong performance in the East-West Shrine Game. He had a YouTube video showing him making a vertical leap onto boxes five feet high. Coming out of Presbyterian, he was projected to be a fifth or sixth round pick. He received an invitation to the NFL Combine and completed all of the required combine drills. His vertical leap of 39 1/2 in (1,000 mm) was the highest of any defensive player who attended the combine. On March 9, 2012, Bethel participated at Presbyterian's pro day and opted to run the 40, 20, and 10-yard dash while also performing positional drills. He was ranked as the seventh best free safety prospect in the draft by NFLDraftScout.com.

Pre-draft measurables
Height	Weight	Arm length	Hand span	40-yard dash	10-yard split	20-yard split	20-yard shuttle	Three-cone drill	Vertical jump	Broad jump	Bench press
5 ft 11 5/8 in (1.82 m)	200 lb (91 kg)	32 3/8 in (0.82 m)	9 3/4 in (0.25 m)	4.58 s	1.60 s	2.68 s	4.30 s	6.79 s	39.5 in (1.00 m)	10 ft 11 in (3.33 m)	19 reps
All values from NFL Combine

=== Arizona Cardinals ===
==== 2012 ====
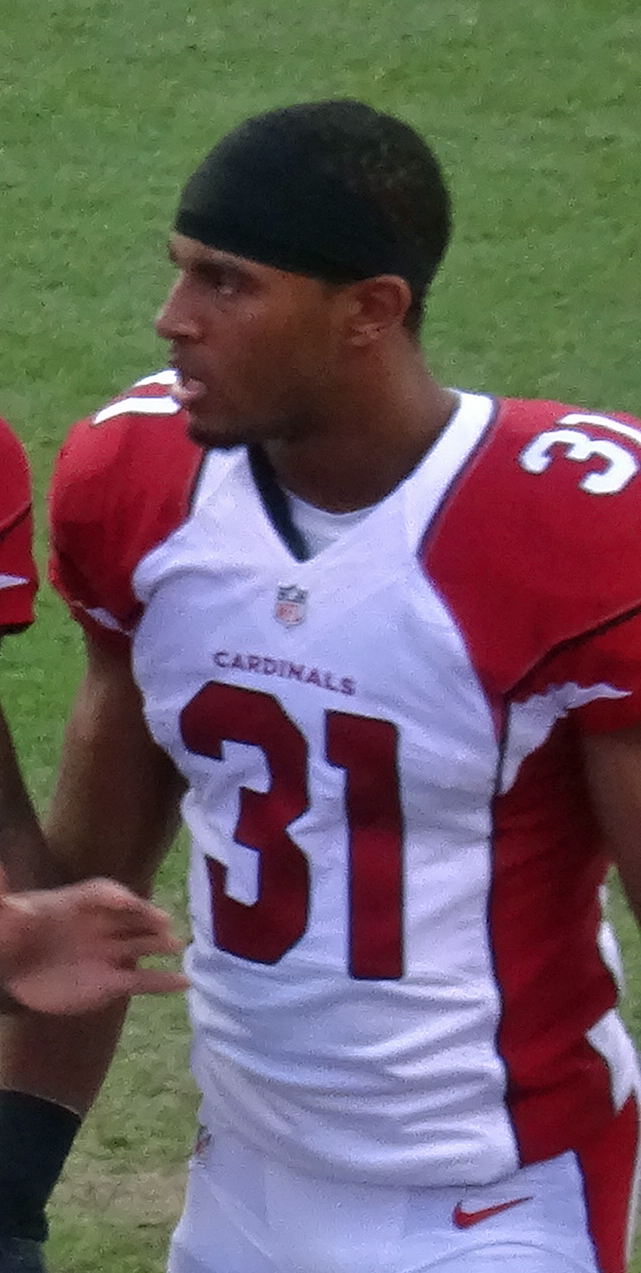
Bethel in 2013

The Arizona Cardinals selected Bethel in the sixth round (177th overall) of the 2012 NFL draft. He was the first Presbyterian player selected in the NFL Draft since 1969. On May 15, 2012, the Arizona Cardinals signed Bethel to a four-year rookie contract.

Bethel entered his first training camp with the Cardinals as a free safety, but was moved to cornerback by defensive coordinator Ray Horton a few weeks into camp. He competed with Greg Toler, Michael Adams, Crezdon Butler, A. J. Jefferson, and Jamell Fleming for a backup cornerback position. Head coach Ken Whisenhunt named him the sixth cornerback on the Arizona Cardinals' depth chart to begin his rookie season, behind Patrick Peterson, William Gay, Greg Toler, Jamell Fleming, and Michael Adams.

Bethel made his professional regular season debut in the Cardinals' season-opening 20–16 win over the Seattle Seahawks. On December 23, 2012, Bethel recovered Olindo Mare's blocked field goal and returned it 82-yards for a touchdown in a 28–13 loss to the Chicago Bears. The Cardinals finished with a 5–11 record and did not qualify for the playoffs. He finished his rookie season with 13 total tackles.

==== 2013 ====
Bethel entered Arizona Cardinals' training camp in 2013 competing with Antoine Cason, Jerraud Powers, Jamell Fleming, Javier Arenas, and Bryan McCann for the vacant starting cornerback position left by the departure of William Gay. New Cardinals' head coach Bruce Arians named him the sixth cornerback on the depth chart to begin the season, behind Patrick Peterson, Jerraud Powers, Antoine Cason, Javier Arenas, and Jamell Fleming.

On September 15, 2013, Bethel blocked a field goal for the first time in his career against the Detroit Lions. On November 10, he blocked another field goal, this time against the Houston Texans. Bethel was selected to be in the 2014 Pro Bowl as a special teams player, joining teammates Patrick Peterson, Antonio Cromartie, and Calais Campbell. He became the first player from Presbyterian to become a Pro bowler. The Cardinals finished with a 10–6 record and did not qualify for the playoffs. He finished his second season with 21 tackles and two field goal blocks.

==== 2014 ====
Bethel gave up his number #31 to Antonio Cromartie and switched to #28, which belonged to Rashard Mendenhall the season prior before he retired. He competed for the starting cornerback job in training camp, going up against Antonio Cromartie, Jerraud Powers, and Brandon Sermons. Head coach Bruce Arians named Bethel the fourth cornerback on the depth chart to begin 2014, behind Patrick Peterson, Antonio Cromartie, and Jerraud Powers.

On November 2, 2014, Bethel recorded his third career blocked field goal against the Dallas Cowboys. He was named the NFC Special Teams Player of the Week three days later. On December 7, Bethel grabbed a game-saving fumble recovery in the fourth quarter against the Kansas City Chiefs, his first recovery of his career on defense. He was also named NFC special teams Player of the Month for December. The last time a Cardinal won this award was Patrick Peterson in November 2011. He finished his third season with 25 total tackles.

Bethel was voted to the 2015 Pro Bowl as a special teams player, becoming the second player in franchise history to make the Pro Bowl multiple times as a special teamer (with Ron Wolfley). The Cardinals finished second in the NFC West with an 11–5 record and received a playoff berth. On January 3, 2015, Bethel appeared in his first career postseason game and tackled Carolina Panthers' punter Brad Nortman in the end zone for a safety during the fourth quarter of a 16–27 loss to the Carolina Panthers in the NFC Wild Card Round.

==== 2015 ====
Bethel entered training camp competing with Jerraud Powers for the vacant starting cornerback job left by the departure of Antonio Cromartie. He started the regular season as the backup to Patrick Peterson and Jerraud Powers.

On September 27, 2015, Bethel recorded his first-career interception and returned it for a 21-yard touchdown during a 47–7 victory over the San Francisco 49ers. He also knocked the ball from DeAndrew White, but it was recovered by a 49er. On October 26, he ripped the ball from Jeremy Ross and recovered the fumble in a 26–18 win over the Baltimore Ravens, his second forced fumble of the season, and third of his career. On November 1, he earned his first career start and recorded four solo tackles and two pass deflections in a 34–20 victory against the Cleveland Browns. On December 5, the Arizona Cardinals signed Bethel to a three-year, $15 million contract extension with $9 million guaranteed and a $3 million signing bonus. He became the starting nickelback for the remainder of the season in Week 16 after safety Tyrann Mathieu tore his ACL and was placed on injured reserve. On December 27, Bethel recorded a career-high eight combined tackles and intercepted a pass attempt by Aaron Rodgers in a 38–8 win over the Green Bay Packers. He finished the regular season with career highs in tackles (46), passes defended (9), and interceptions (2), as well as two forced fumbles and a touchdown.

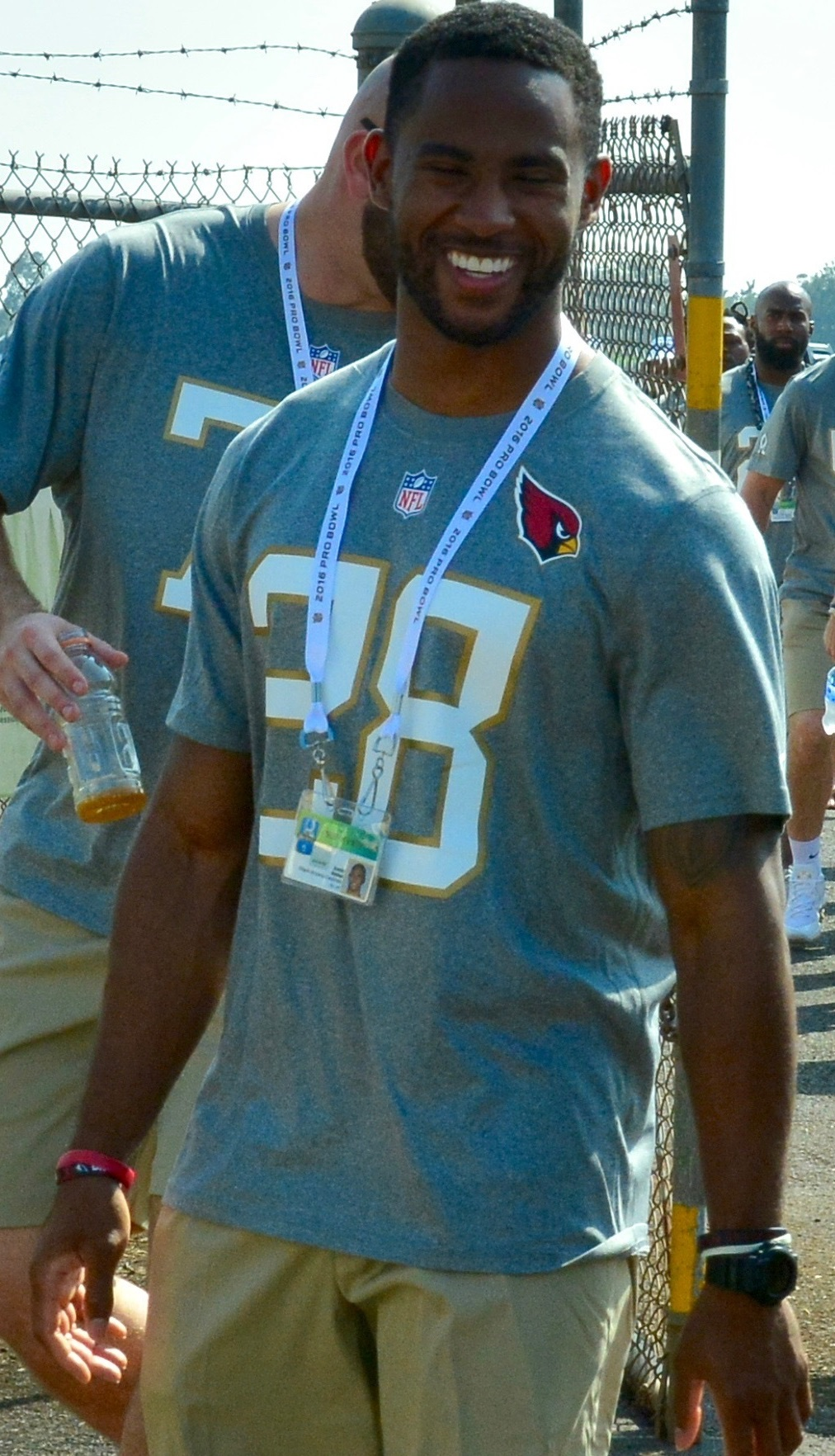
Bethel at the 2016 Pro Bowl

He received his third consecutive invitation to the 2016 Pro Bowl as a special teams player. The Arizona Cardinals finished the 2015 season as NFC West champs after finishing 13–3. On January 16, 2016, Bethel started in his first career postseason game and collected six solo tackles and defended a pass as the Cardinals defeated the Green Bay Packers 26–20 in overtime, winning the NFC Divisional Round. On January 24, he started the NFC Championship against the Panthers and made four combined tackles and a pass deflection during a 15–49 loss.

In 2015, his high school alma mater, Blythewood High School, retired his jersey number 31.

==== 2016 ====
On April 20, 2016, it was reported that Bethel had undergone surgery earlier in the week to repair slight fracture in his ankle that he had suffered on November 23, 2015, against the Cincinnati Bengals. He missed organized team activities and the first three weeks of training camp. Bethel was expected to be the Arizona Cardinal's starting cornerback alongside Patrick Peterson after Jerraud Powers had departed through free agency. Upon his arrival at training camp, he competed with Mike Jenkins, Asa Jackson, Tharold Simon, and Brandon Williams. He began the 2016 season as the backup to Patrick Peterson and Brandon Williams.

On November 13, he earned his first start of the season and recorded four solo tackles and deflected a pass during a 23–20 victory over the San Francisco 49ers On November 20, Bethel blocked a Kai Forbath extra point in the second quarter against the Minnesota Vikings, marking his fourth career blocked kick. On January 1, 2017, Bethel returned an interception for a 66-yard touchdown in the fourth quarter of a 44–6 victory over the Los Angeles Rams. The Cardinals finished with a 7–8–1 record and did not qualify for the playoffs. He finished the 2016 season with 39 tackles, six pass deflections, an interception, and a touchdown.

==== 2017 ====
Bethel entered training camp in 2017 competing against Brandon Williams, Tramon Williams, and Harlan Miller for the vacant starting cornerback position after Marcus Cooper departed for the Chicago Bears during free agency. Head coach Bruce Arians named Bethel the starting cornerback, along with Patrick Peterson, to begin the regular season. It marked the first time he had been named the starting cornerback to begin the regular season in Bethel's career.

He started in the Cardinals' season opening 35–23 loss to the Lions and returned an interception off Matthew Stafford for an 82-yard touchdown in the first quarter. He lost the starting job and was demoted to the team's No. 3 cornerback in Week 7 due to the emergence of the veteran Tramon Williams. The Cardinals finished with an 8–8 record and did not qualify for the playoffs. He finished the 2017 season with 41 tackles, four pass deflections, an interception, and a touchdown.

=== Atlanta Falcons ===
On March 24, 2018, Bethel signed with the Atlanta Falcons. He played in 14 games primarily on special teams, recording 14 tackles.

=== Baltimore Ravens ===
On March 15, 2019, Bethel signed a two-year contract with the Baltimore Ravens. He was released on October 21, 2019.

=== New England Patriots ===
On October 22, 2019, Bethel signed a two-year contract with the New England Patriots. Bethel made his debut with the Patriots in week 9 against the Baltimore Ravens. In the game, Bethel recovered a muffed punt by return man Cyrus Jones in the 37–20 loss. In week 15 against the Bengals, Bethel recovered a punt muffed by punt returner Alex Erickson during the 34–13 win. In the 2019 season, he appeared in all 16 games, mainly in a special teams role. He had three fumble recoveries on the year.

In the 2020 season, Bethel appeared in all 16 games in mainly a special teams role.

On March 12, 2021, Bethel re-signed with the Patriots on a three-year, $6 million contract. In the 2021 season, he played in all 17 games with a majority of his production coming on special teams.

On August 30, 2022, Bethel was released by the Patriots.

=== Miami Dolphins ===
On September 1, 2022, Bethel signed with the Miami Dolphins. He appeared in all 17 games with a majority of his production coming on special teams. He had one interception on the season.

Bethel re-signed with the Dolphins on March 24, 2023. He played in all 17 games (including 1 start), recording 1 pass deflection, 0.5 sacks, and 19 combined tackles. Bethel became a free agent after the season.

On January 8, 2025, Bethel announced his retirement from professional football.

== NFL career statistics ==
Legend
**Bold**	Career high

=== Regular season ===
Year	Team	Games		Tackles					Interceptions					Fumbles			
Year	Team	GP	GS	Cmb	Solo	Ast	Sck	TFL	Int	Yds	TD	Lng	PD	FF	FR	Yds	TD
2012	ARI	16	0	13	12	1	0.0	0	0	0	0	0	0	0	0	0	0
2013	ARI	16	0	21	17	4	0.0	0	0	0	0	0	0	0	1	-3	0
2014	ARI	16	0	25	21	4	0.0	0	0	0	0	0	0	1	1	0	0
2015	ARI	16	5	**46**	**44**	2	0.0	0	**2**	21	**1**	21	**9**	**2**	**2**	0	0
2016	ARI	16	3	39	37	2	0.0	**3**	1	66	**1**	66	6	1	1	0	0
2017	ARI	16	**6**	41	29	**12**	0.0	1	1	**82**	**1**	**82**	4	0	0	0	0
2018	ATL	14	0	14	12	2	0.0	0	0	0	0	0	0	0	0	0	0
2019	BAL	7	0	6	4	2	0.0	0	0	0	0	0	0	0	1	0	0
2019	NWE	9	0	6	5	1	0.0	0	0	0	0	0	0	0	**2**	0	0
2020	NWE	16	0	14	13	1	0.0	0	0	0	0	0	0	0	0	0	0
2021	NWE	**17**	0	12	9	3	0.0	0	0	0	0	0	1	1	0	0	0
2022	MIA	**17**	0	26	17	9	0.0	0	1	11	0	11	4	0	0	0	0
2023	MIA	**17**	1	19	15	4	**0.5**	2	0	0	0	0	1	0	0	0	0
		193	15	282	235	47	0.5	6	5	180	3	82	25	5	8	-3	0

=== Playoffs ===
Year	Team	Games		Tackles					Interceptions					Fumbles			
Year	Team	GP	GS	Cmb	Solo	Ast	Sck	TFL	Int	Yds	TD	Lng	PD	FF	FR	Yds	TD
2014	ARI	1	0	1	1	0	0.0	**1**	0	0	0	0	0	0	**1**	0	0
2015	ARI	**2**	**2**	**10**	**10**	0	0.0	0	0	0	0	0	**2**	0	0	0	0
2019	NWE	1	0	0	0	0	0.0	0	0	0	0	0	0	0	0	0	0
2021	NWE	1	0	0	0	0	0.0	0	0	0	0	0	0	0	0	0	0
2022	MIA	1	0	0	0	0	0.0	0	0	0	0	0	0	0	0	0	0
2023	MIA	1	0	0	0	0	0.0	0	0	0	0	0	0	0	0	0	0
		7	2	11	11	0	0.0	1	0	0	0	0	2	0	1	0	0
