= Brandon Bolden =

American football player (born 1990)

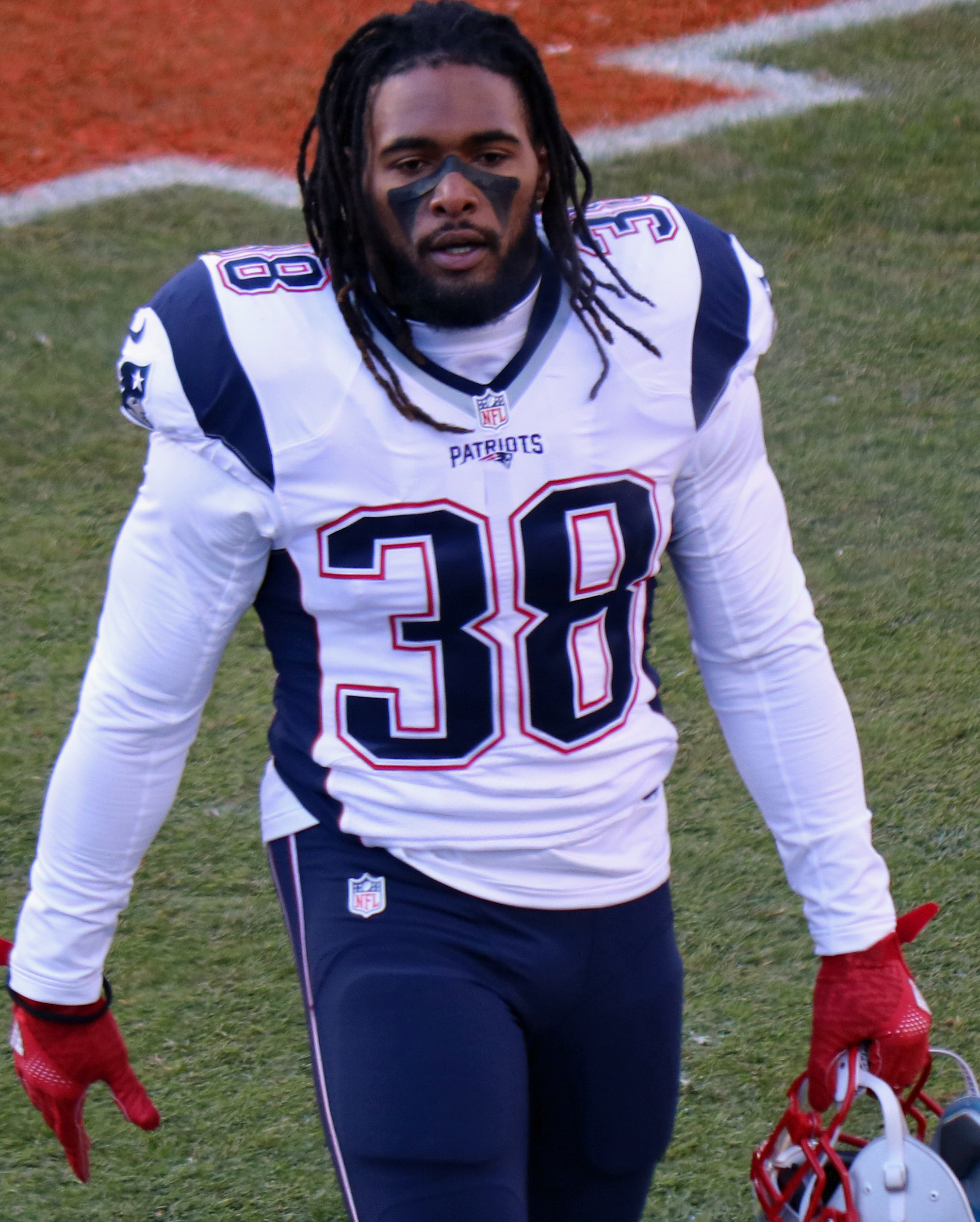
- Bolden with the New England Patriots in 2016

No. 38
- Position: Running back

Personal information
- Born: January 26, 1990 (age 36); Baton Rouge, Louisiana, U.S.
- Listed height: 5 ft 11 in (1.80 m)
- Listed weight: 220 lb (100 kg)

Career information
- High school: Scotlandville Magnet (Baton Rouge)
- College: Ole Miss (2008–2011)
- NFL draft: 2012: undrafted

Career history
- New England Patriots (2012–2017); Miami Dolphins (2018); New England Patriots (2019–2021); Las Vegas Raiders (2022–2023)

Awards and highlights
- 2× Super Bowl champion (XLIX, LI)

Career NFL statistics
- Rushing yards: 1,304
- Rushing average: 4.6
- Receptions: 109
- Receiving yards: 959
- Return yards: 609
- Total touchdowns: 20
- Total tackles: 63
- Stats at Pro Football Reference

Brandon Bolden (born January 26, 1990) is an American former professional football player who was a running back in the National Football League (NFL). He played college football for the Ole Miss Rebels. He was signed as an undrafted free agent in 2012 by the New England Patriots, where he played nine non-consecutive seasons. Primarily utilized as a special teams player, Bolden was a member of two Super Bowl-winning teams with New England. In between his two Patriots stints, he played for the Miami Dolphins in 2018. Bolden left the Patriots a second time to join the Las Vegas Raiders in 2022.

== Early life ==
Bolden attended Scotlandville Magnet High School in Baton Rouge, Louisiana. As a senior, Bolden rushed for 886 yards and 12 touchdowns en route to being named First-team All-District 5-5A. He also caught 12 passes for 256 yards. SuperPrep named him SuperPrep All-Region and ranked him the No. 34 best player in Louisiana. Bolden was named the No. 93 best running back in the nation by Scout.com. He was heavily recruited by Les Miles and LSU, but ultimately decided to play for Houston Nutt at Ole Miss.

== College career ==
Although fellow running back Enrique Davis was more regarded as a recruit, by his sophomore year, Bolden had gained the starting role for the Rebels. In the 2009 season, he finished with 129 carries for 614 yards and four touchdowns. In the 2010 season, Bolden averaged nearly six yards a carry. Against BYU in the first game of the 2011 season, Bolden suffered a broken ankle. Although the fracture was a minor one and he only missed a few games, he never returned to his previous form. He finished the 2011 season with 96 carries for 472 yards and four touchdowns. He was not selected in the 2012 NFL draft, although some sites predicted he might be drafted in one of the later rounds. Although Bleacher Report reported on April 30, 2012, that he had agreed to a free agent contract with the Washington Redskins, Bolden later tweeted that the report was false. On May 2, 2012, a New York Times blog reported that he had signed a free agent deal with the New England Patriots.

== Professional career ==
Pre-draft measurables
Height	Weight	Arm length	Hand span	40-yard dash	10-yard split	20-yard split	20-yard shuttle	Three-cone drill	Vertical jump	Broad jump	Bench press
5 ft 10 7/8 in (1.80 m)	222 lb (101 kg)	32 1/4 in (0.82 m)	10 in (0.25 m)	4.66 s	1.63 s	2.74 s	4.44 s	6.96 s	38.0 in (0.97 m)	9 ft 11 in (3.02 m)	21 reps
All values from NFL Combine

=== New England Patriots (first stint) ===
During the 2012 preseason, Bolden had 36 carries for 128 yards and caught four passes, but fumbled the ball twice, losing one. Nevertheless, at the end of training camp, the Patriots elected to keep Bolden on their 53-man roster, rather than try to place him on their practice squad. He scored his first touchdown in the Patriots' Week 3 loss to the Baltimore Ravens; in Week 4, against the Buffalo Bills, he led the Patriots with 137 yards on 16 carries—an average of 8.6 yards per carry. He scored one touchdown and added an 11-yard reception. He and Stevan Ridley, who had 106 yards on 22 carries with two touchdowns, became the first Patriots running backs to accrue 100 rushing yards in the same game since 1982. Moreover, Wes Welker and Rob Gronkowski had 100-yard games that day as well, making the four only the second such quartet of two 100-yard rushers and two 100-yard receivers in a single game for the same team. For his efforts, Bolden was named the NFL's FedEx Ground Player of the Week for Week 4. On November 9, 2012, Bolden was suspended four games for violating the NFL's policy on performance-enhancing substances. Overall, he finished the 2012 season with 56 carries for 274 yards and two touchdowns. Bolden was active for 12 of the Patriots' games during the 2013 season and finished the year with 271 rushing yards, three rushing touchdowns and 4.9 yards per carry; he also had 152 receiving yards.

Bolden was a part of the Patriots Super Bowl XLIX championship team when they defeated the Seattle Seahawks, 28–24, and played in all 19 of the Patriots regular-season and postseason games. On January 9, 2015, Bolden was signed to a two-year extension by the Patriots. On November 9, 2015, Bolden caught his first touchdown pass, an 18-yarder from Tom Brady, against the Washington Redskins. On November 29, Bolden caught his second touchdown pass on a 63-yard catch-and-run in a loss to the Denver Broncos. In the 2016 season, Bolden went back to a reserve role on offense and played mostly on special teams. On February 5, 2017, Bolden was part of the Patriots team that won Super Bowl LI. In the game, he played only on special teams as the Patriots defeated the Atlanta Falcons by a score of 34–28 in overtime. The Patriots trailed 28–3 in the third quarter, but rallied to win the game, 34–28, in the first overtime game in Super Bowl history and the largest comeback in Super Bowl history.

On April 5, 2017, Bolden re-signed with the Patriots. On September 2, 2017, he was released by the Patriots, but was re-signed two days later. As in 2016, he saw little action as a running back. In the first half of 2017, he saw no carries from the backfield, but served extensively on special teams, serving as a gunner opposite Matthew Slater. Bolden recorded six special teams tackles through Week 9 of 2017.

On February 24, 2018, Bolden signed a one-year contract extension with the Patriots through the 2018 season. On September 1, Bolden was released by the Patriots.

=== Miami Dolphins ===
On September 4, 2018, Bolden signed with the Miami Dolphins. He mainly played on special teams and recorded 91 rushing yards (54 of which came on one play, which was a career long, against the Patriots in the Miracle in Miami game), two rushing touchdowns, and a receiving touchdown on the 2018 season.

=== New England Patriots (second stint) ===
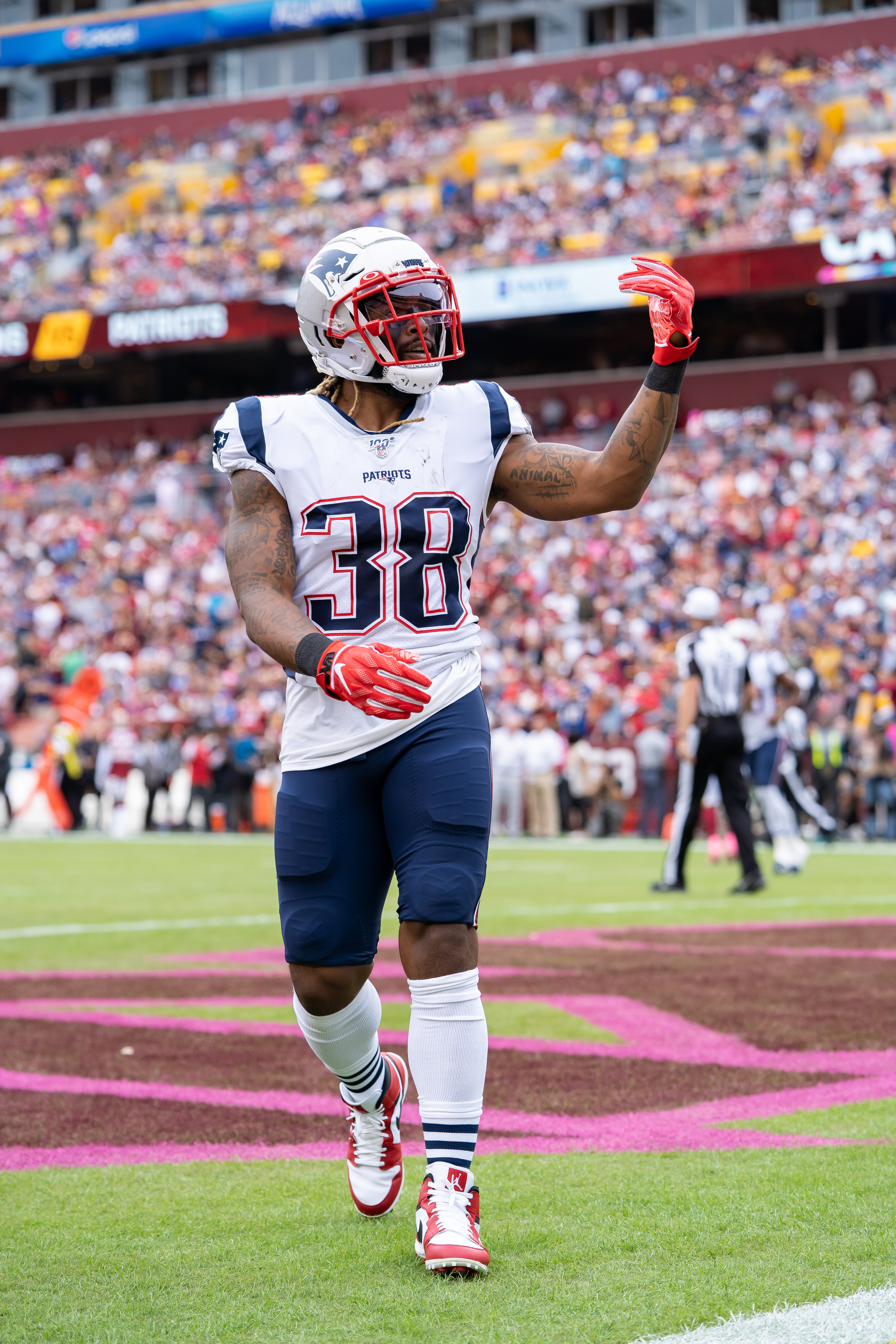
Bolden in a game against the Washington Redskins in 2019

On March 13, 2019, Bolden signed a two-year contract with the Patriots. Overall, in the 2019 season, Bolden recorded 15 carries for 68 rushing yards and three rushing touchdowns to go along with nine receptions for 111 receiving yards and one receiving touchdown.

On July 28, 2020, Bolden announced his decision to opt out of the 2020 season, due to concerns over the ongoing COVID-19 pandemic.

In 2021, Bolden had a career-high 405 receiving yards on 41 receptions as the Patriots primary third-down back, along with 44 carries for 226 rushing yards.

=== Las Vegas Raiders ===
On March 16, 2022, Bolden signed with the Las Vegas Raiders on a one-year deal. He appeared in 16 of the 17 regular season games in 2022 and mainly contributed on special teams.

In Week 15, against the Los Angeles Chargers, Bolden scored a 26-yard rushing touchdown on just his second carry of the 2023 season. In the 2023 season, he appeared in 17 games in mainly a special teams role.

== Career statistics ==
=== NFL ===
Legend
	Won the Super Bowl
**Bold**	Career high

Year	Team	Games		Rushing					Receiving					Fumbles		Tackles		
Year	Team	GP	GS	Att	Yds	Avg	Lng	TD	Rec	Yds	Avg	Lng	TD	Fum	Lost	Cmb	Solo	Ast
2012	NE	10	0	56	**274**	4.9	27	2	2	11	5.5	11	0	0	0	5	5	0
2013	NE	12	**2**	55	271	4.9	46	**3**	21	152	7.2	18	0	0	0	0	0	0
2014	NE	16	**2**	28	89	3.2	17	1	2	8	4.0	4	0	0	0	6	4	**2**
2015	NE	15	**2**	**63**	207	3.3	14	0	19	180	9.5	**63T**	**2**	0	0	3	2	1
2016	NE	14	0	1	4	4.0	4	0	2	15	7.5	13	0	0	0	4	4	0
2017	NE	16	0	13	67	5.2	20	0	1	7	7.0	7	0	0	0	8	7	1
2018	MIA	16	0	8	91	**11.4**	**54**	2	3	13	4.3	9	1	**1**	**1**	6	4	**2**
2019	NE	15	**2**	15	68	4.5	21	**3**	9	111	**12.3**	29	1	0	0	7	7	0
2020	NE	0	0	Did not play due to COVID-19 opt-out														
2021	NE	**17**	1	44	226	4.1	24	1	**41**	**405**	9.9	28	**2**	1	0	**11**	**9**	2
2022	LV	16	0	17	66	3.9	12	0	9	57	6.3	18	1	0	0	8	5	**3**
2023	LV	**17**	0	4	31	7.8	26	1	0	0	0.0	0	0	0	0	4	3	1
Career		164	9	304	1,394	4.6	54	13	109	959	8.8	63	7	2	1	63	50	13

=== College ===
Season	Team	Conf	Class	Pos	GP	Rushing				Receiving			
Season	Team	Conf	Class	Pos	GP	Att	Yds	Avg	TD	Rec	Yds	Avg	TD
2008	Ole Miss	SEC	FR	RB	13	98	542	5.5	5	10	107	10.7	1
2009	Ole Miss	SEC	SO	RB	13	129	614	4.8	4	20	209	10.5	1
2010	Ole Miss	SEC	JR	RB	12	163	976	6.0	14	32	344	10.8	3
2011	Ole Miss	SEC	SR	RB	10	96	462	4.8	4	14	147	10.5	1
Career					48	486	2,594	5.3	27	76	807	10.6	6

== Personal life ==
Brandon and his wife Arianna have three children together. Their son Brycen was born in May 2011, their daughter Axelle-Masai was born in March 2017, and their youngest daughter Aviana was born in February 2019. The couple was married in June 2014, having been together since 2008 when they both attended Scotlandville Magnet High School.

Bolden's grandfather, Frank Pitts, was a wide receiver who played for the Oakland Raiders in 1974. Pitts played for the Kansas City Chiefs in Super Bowl I and Super Bowl IV. In 2021, Bolden changed his jersey number from 38 to 25 so Pitts could see his grandson playing in his number.

On December 31, 2021, Bolden revealed that he had suffered from cancer in 2018. He was diagnosed with epidermoid carcinoma, a form of skin cancer, following the Patriots' loss to the Philadelphia Eagles in Super Bowl LII and temporarily lost function of the right side of his face. He since underwent surgery and is cancer-free.
