= Tre Nixon =

American football player (born 1998)

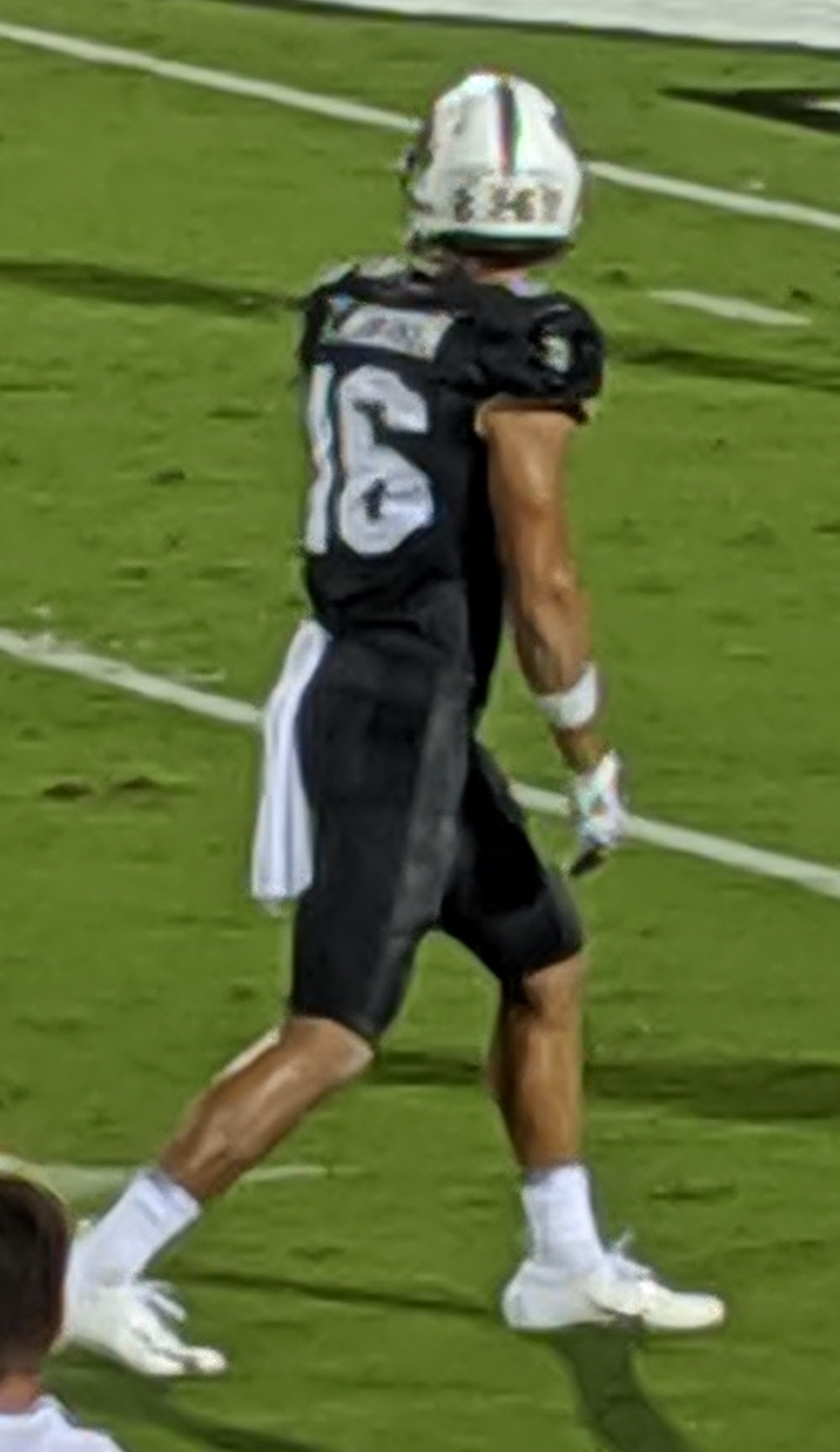
- Nixon with the UCF Knights in 2019

No. 87
- Position: Wide receiver

Personal information
- Born: January 26, 1998 (age 28); Viera, Florida, U.S.
- Listed height: 6 ft 2 in (1.88 m)
- Listed weight: 190 lb (86 kg)

Career information
- High school: Viera
- College: Ole Miss (2016–2017); UCF (2018–2020)
- NFL draft: 2021: 7th round, 242nd overall pick

Career history
- New England Patriots (2021–2023)*
- * Offseason or practice squad member only
- Stats at Pro Football Reference

Tre Nixon (born January 26, 1998) is an American former professional football wide receiver. He played college football for the Ole Miss Rebels and UCF Knights.

Drafted by the New England Patriots in 2021. He was chosen by long time Patriots director of football research Ernie Adams at pick 242 in the seventh round, which would be Adams’ final career pick. Nixon retired after three seasons in 2024.

== Professional career ==
Pre-draft measurables
Height	Weight	Arm length	Hand span	40-yard dash	10-yard split	20-yard split	20-yard shuttle	Three-cone drill	Vertical jump	Broad jump	Bench press
6 ft 0 1/8 in (1.83 m)	187 lb (85 kg)	31 3/4 in (0.81 m)	9 1/8 in (0.23 m)	4.44 s	1.57 s	2.51 s	4.25 s	6.81 s	35.5 in (0.90 m)	10 ft 5 in (3.18 m)	18 reps
All values from Pro Day

Nixon was selected in the seventh round, 242nd overall, of the 2021 NFL draft by the New England Patriots. On May 11, 2021, Nixon officially signed with the Patriots. Nixon chose to wear 87 making him the first player since Rob Gronkowski to wear the number. He was waived on August 31, 2021, and re-signed to the practice squad. He signed a reserve/future contract with the Patriots on January 17, 2022.

Nixon switched from 87 to 82 for the 2022 season. On August 30, 2022, Nixon was waived by the Patriots and signed to the practice squad the next day. He signed a reserve/future contract on January 10, 2023.

On August 22, 2023, Nixon was waived/injured by the Patriots after suffering a shoulder injury in the preseason. The next day, Nixon cleared waivers and reverted to the Patriots injured reserve list. On July 8, 2024, Nixon announced his retirement from football via social media.
