= LaRoy Reynolds =

American football player (born 1990)

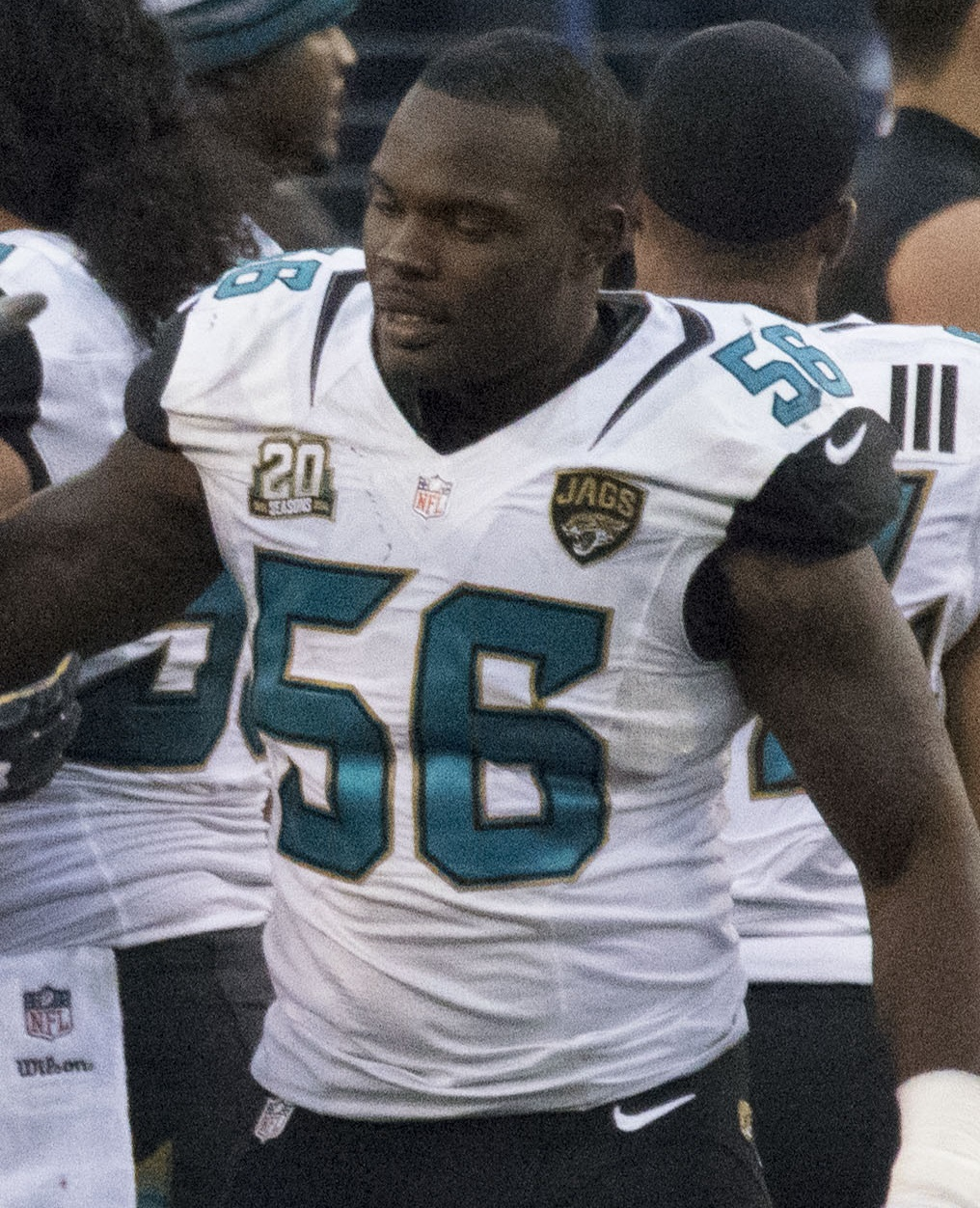
- Reynolds with the Jacksonville Jaguars in 2014

Cleveland Browns
- Title: Coach

Personal information
- Born: November 3, 1990 (age 36); Norfolk, Virginia, U.S.
- Listed height: 6 ft 1 in (1.85 m)
- Listed weight: 243 lb (110 kg)

Career information
- High school: Maury (Norfolk)
- College: Virginia
- NFL draft: 2013: undrafted

Career history

Playing
- Jacksonville Jaguars (2013–2015); Chicago Bears (2015); Atlanta Falcons (2016–2017); Philadelphia Eagles (2018); San Francisco 49ers (2019)*; Cincinnati Bengals (2019); Atlanta Falcons (2020); New England Patriots (2021)*; New York Jets (2021); New England Patriots (2021)*
- * Offseason or practice squad member only

Coaching
- Norfolk State (2025) Linebackers coach; Cleveland Browns (2026–present) Defensive line development assistant

Career NFL statistics
- Total tackles: 118
- Forced fumbles: 1
- Fumble recoveries: 3
- Stats at Pro Football Reference

LaRoy Reynolds (born November 3, 1990) is an American former professional football player who was a linebacker in the National Football League (NFL). He was signed by the Jacksonville Jaguars as an undrafted free agent after the 2013 NFL draft. He played college football for the Virginia Cavaliers. He currently serves as a defensive line development assistant for the Cleveland Browns of the NFL.

== College career ==
After attending Matthew Fontaine Maury High School in Virginia, Reynolds played college football for the Cavaliers at the University of Virginia.

== Professional career ==
Pre-draft measurables
Height	Weight	Arm length	Hand span	40-yard dash	10-yard split	20-yard split	20-yard shuttle	Three-cone drill	Vertical jump	Broad jump	Bench press
6 ft 0 1/2 in (1.84 m)	243 lb (110 kg)	32 1/8 in (0.82 m)	9 1/2 in (0.24 m)	4.59 s	1.56 s	2.64 s	4.26 s	7.33 s	37.0 in (0.94 m)	10 ft 5 in (3.18 m)	29 reps
All values from Pro Day

=== Jacksonville Jaguars ===
After going undrafted, Reynolds made the Jacksonville Jaguars' final roster on August 30, 2013. Reynolds was suspended by the NFL on November 12, for four games for violating the NFL policy on performance-enhancing substances.

=== Chicago Bears ===
On September 29, 2015, Reynolds signed with the Chicago Bears.

=== Atlanta Falcons (first stint) ===
On March 16, 2016, Reynolds signed with the Atlanta Falcons. In the 2016 season, Reynolds and the Falcons reached Super Bowl LI, where they faced the New England Patriots on February 5, 2017. In the Super Bowl, the Falcons fell in a 34–28 overtime defeat.

On March 9, 2017, Reynolds signed a one-year contract extension with the Falcons. He was placed on injured reserve on September 4, after suffering a pectoral injury. Reynolds was activated off injured reserve to the active roster on October 31.

=== Philadelphia Eagles ===
On May 15, 2018, Reynolds signed with the Philadelphia Eagles.

=== San Francisco 49ers ===
On May 6, 2019, Reynolds signed with the San Francisco 49ers. However, Reynolds was later released by the 49ers on August 31.

=== Cincinnati Bengals ===
On September 10, 2019, Reynolds signed with the Cincinnati Bengals.

=== Atlanta Falcons (second stint) ===
On March 25, 2020, Reynolds was signed by the Atlanta Falcons. In Week 12 against the Las Vegas Raiders, Reynolds forced a fumble on running back Josh Jacobs and later recovered a fumble lost by quarterback Derek Carr during the 43–6 win.

=== New England Patriots (first stint) ===
Reynolds signed with the New England Patriots on March 24, 2021. On May 27, Reynolds was released by the Patriots with an injury settlement.

=== New York Jets ===
On October 26, 2021, Reynolds was signed to the New York Jets' practice squad. He was released by the Jets on January 4, 2022.

=== New England Patriots (second stint) ===
On January 5, 2022, Reynolds was signed to the New England Patriots' practice squad.

== Coaching career ==
=== Norfolk State ===
On April 8, 2025, Reynolds was hired as the linebackers coach under Michael Vick at Norfolk State.

=== Cleveland Browns ===
On May 11, 2026, Reynolds was hired to serve as a defensive line development assistant for the Cleveland Browns under new head coach Todd Monken.
