= Kristian Wilkerson =

American football player (born 1997)

Profile
- Position: Wide receiver

Personal information
- Born: January 10, 1997 (age 29); Memphis, Tennessee, U.S.
- Listed height: 6 ft 1 in (1.85 m)
- Listed weight: 214 lb (97 kg)

Career information
- High school: Craigmont (Memphis)
- College: Southeast Missouri State (2015–2019)
- NFL draft: 2020: undrafted

Career history
- Tennessee Titans (2020)*; New England Patriots (2020–2022); Indianapolis Colts (2023)*; Las Vegas Raiders (2023–2024); Buffalo Bills (2025)*; Tennessee Titans (2025)*; Buffalo Bills (2025)*; Atlanta Falcons (2026)*
- * Offseason or practice squad member only

Awards and highlights
- First-team All-OVC (2019); Second-team All-OVC (2018)

Career NFL statistics as of 2024
- Receptions: 6
- Receiving yards: 60
- Receiving touchdowns: 3
- Stats at Pro Football Reference

Kristian De'Jon Wilkerson (born January 10, 1997) is an American professional football wide receiver. He played college football for the Southeast Missouri State Redhawks.

== College career ==
Wilkerson was a member of the Southeast Missouri State Redhawks for five seasons, redshirting as a true freshman. As a redshirt senior, he caught 71 passes for 1,350 yards and 10 touchdowns and was named first-team All-Ohio Valley Conference and a second-team All-American by HERO Sports. Wilkerson finished his collegiate career with 219 receptions for 3,540 yards and 33 touchdowns, all of which were school records.

== Professional career ==
Pre-draft measurables
Height	Weight	Arm length	Hand span	Wingspan	40-yard dash	10-yard split	20-yard split	20-yard shuttle	Three-cone drill	Vertical jump	Broad jump	Bench press
6 ft 1 1/8 in (1.86 m)	200 lb (91 kg)	31 7/8 in (0.81 m)	9 3/4 in (0.25 m)	6 ft 4 3/8 in (1.94 m)	4.50 s	1.45 s	2.54 s	4.09 s	6.68 s	39.5 in (1.00 m)	10 ft 8 in (3.25 m)	12 reps
All values from Pro Day

=== Tennessee Titans ===
Wilkerson was signed by the Tennessee Titans as an undrafted free agent on May 4, 2020. He was waived on September 5, 2020, during final roster cuts.

=== New England Patriots ===
Wilkerson was signed to the practice squad of the New England Patriots on September 8, 2020. Wilkerson was elevated to the Patriots' active roster on November 9, and made his debut that night on Monday Night Football in a 30–27 win over the New York Jets. He reverted to the practice squad after the game.

Wilkerson signed a reserve/future contract with New England on January 4, 2021. On August 31, he was released as part of final roster cuts, but re-signed with the practice squad the following day.

On January 2, 2022, Wilkerson was elevated for the Week 17 game against the Jacksonville Jaguars and scored his first two NFL touchdowns. He signed a reserve/future contract with the Patriots on January 17.

On August 30, 2022, Wilkerson was placed on injured reserve. On February 15, 2023, the Patriots waived Wilkerson.

=== Indianapolis Colts ===
On February 16, 2023, Wilkerson was claimed off waivers by the Indianapolis Colts. He was waived by Indianapolis on May 2.

=== Las Vegas Raiders ===
On May 15, 2023, Wilkerson signed with the Las Vegas Raiders. He was waived on November 4 and re-signed to the practice squad three days later. Wilkerson signed a reserve/future contract with Las Vegas on January 8, 2024.

On August 27, 2024, Wilkerson was waived by the Raiders and re-signed to the practice squad. He signed a reserve/future contract with Las Vegas on January 6, 2025. On May 12, Wilkerson was released by the Raiders.

=== Buffalo Bills ===
On May 19, 2025, Wilkerson signed with the Buffalo Bills. He was released on August 26 as part of final roster cuts and re-signed to the practice squad the next day. Wilkerson was released on November 11.

=== Tennessee Titans (second stint) ===
On November 18, 2025, Wilkerson signed with the Tennessee Titans' practice squad. He was released on November 25. On December 2, Wilkerson was re-signed to the practice squad. He was released by the Titans on December 22.

=== Buffalo Bills (second stint) ===
On January 13, 2026, Wilkerson signed with the Buffalo Bills' practice squad.

=== Atlanta Falcons ===
On August 7, 2026, Wilkerson signed with the Atlanta Falcons. He was released by the Falcons on August 17.
