= 2022 New England Patriots season =

63rd season in franchise history

- Owner: Robert Kraft
- Head coach: Bill Belichick
- Home stadium: Gillette Stadium

Results
- Record: 8–9
- Division place: 3rd AFC East
- Playoffs: Did not qualify
- All-Pros: PR Marcus Jones (1st team)
- Pro Bowlers: LB Matthew Judon

Uniform
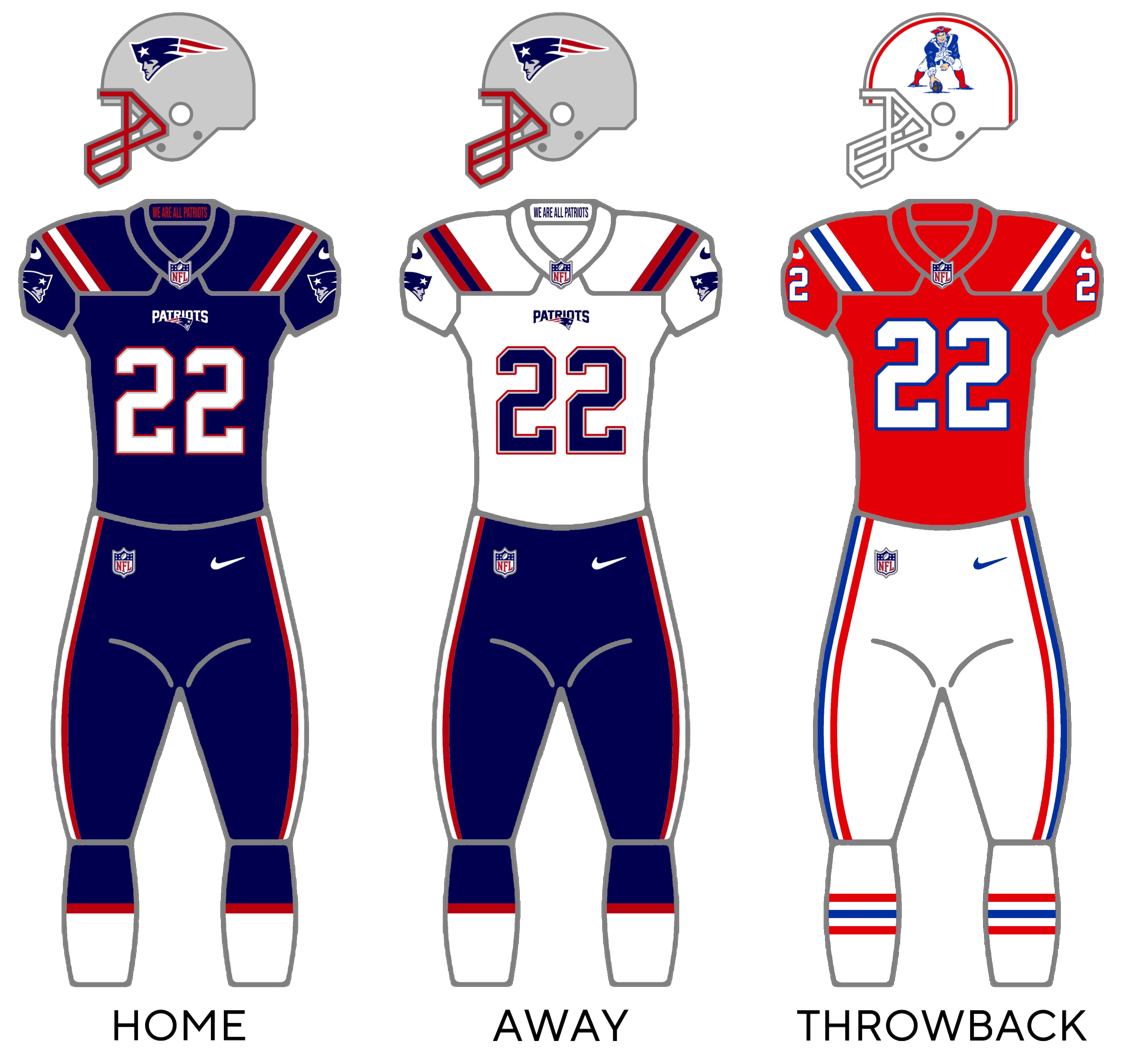

The 2022 season was the New England Patriots' 53rd in the National Football League (NFL), their 63rd overall, their 21st playing home games at Gillette Stadium, and their 23rd under head coach Bill Belichick. The Patriots finished 8–9 and missed the playoffs for the second time in three years.

Ahead of the season, longtime offensive coordinator Josh McDaniels left to become the head coach of the Las Vegas Raiders. Former defensive coordinator Matt Patricia was given offensive playcalling duties and former special teams coordinator Joe Judge was named quarterbacks coach, despite both having no prior offensive coaching experience. Under Patricia and Judge, the offense suffered a noticeable regression from the previous season, dropping from 15th in yards and sixth in points scored to 26th in yards and 17th in points scored. The decision to replace McDaniels with Patricia and Judge was widely criticized and both would be removed from the offense in favor of returning offensive coordinator Bill O'Brien for the 2023 season.

The season also saw the Patriots wear red and white throwback uniforms for the first time since 2012 after an NFL rule requiring teams to wear the same helmet designs for the entire season was rescinded.

== Roster changes ==
=== Free agency ===
==== Unrestricted ====
Position	Player	2022 team	Date signed	Contract
MLB	Ja'Whaun Bentley	New England Patriots	March 21, 2022	2 years, $6 million
RB	Brandon Bolden	Las Vegas Raiders	March 17, 2022	2 years, $5.01 million
OT	Trent Brown	New England Patriots	March 23, 2022	2 years, $13 million
OLB	Jamie Collins			
DT	Carl Davis	New England Patriots	April 28, 2022	1 year, $1.19 million
K	Nick Folk	New England Patriots	March 21, 2022	2 years, $5 million
TE	Troy Fumagalli	San Francisco 49ers	May 17, 2022	1 year, $895,000
MLB	Dont'a Hightower			
QB	Brian Hoyer	New England Patriots	March 14, 2022	2 years, $4 million
CB	J. C. Jackson	Los Angeles Chargers	March 16, 2022	5 years, $82.5 million
C	Ted Karras	Cincinnati Bengals	March 17, 2022	3 years, $18 million
OLB	Brandon King	Indianapolis Colts	April 13, 2022	1 year, $1.19 million
FS	Devin McCourty	New England Patriots	March 13, 2022	1 year, $9 million
WR	Matthew Slater	New England Patriots	March 16, 2022	1 year, $2.62 million
RB	James White	New England Patriots	March 17, 2022	2 years, $5 million

==== Restricted ====
Position	Player	2022 team	Date signed	Contract
FB	Jakob Johnson	Las Vegas Raiders	March 17, 2022	1 year, $1.5 million
WR	Jakobi Meyers	New England Patriots	June 16, 2022	1 year, $3.99 million
WR	Gunner Olszewski	Pittsburgh Steelers	March 21, 2022	2 years, $4.2 million

==== Exclusive-rights ====
Position	Player	2022 team	Date signed	Contract
OLB	Terez Hall			

==== Signings/waiver claims ====
Position	Player	Previous team	Date signed	Contract
C	James Ferentz	New England Patriots	March 14, 2022	1 year, $1.075 million
CB	Terrance Mitchell	Houston Texans	March 16, 2022	1 year, $1.75 million
WR	Ty Montgomery	New Orleans Saints	March 19, 2022	2 years, $3.6 million
CB	Malcolm Butler	Arizona Cardinals	March 24, 2022	2 years, $9 million
SS	Jabrill Peppers	New York Giants	April 4, 2022	1 year, $2 million
TE	Matt Sokol	Detroit Lions	May 11, 2022	1 year, $705,000
K	Tristan Vizcaino	Los Angeles Chargers	June 10, 2022	1 year, $825,000
WR	Lil'Jordan Humphrey	New Orleans Saints	June 16, 2022	1 year, $965,000
C	Darryl Williams	Kansas City Chiefs	June 21, 2022	1 year, $705,000
DT	Jeremiah Pharms Jr.	Pittsburgh Maulers (USFL)	July 19, 2022	1 year, $705,000
WR	Josh Hammond	Philadelphia Eagles	July 29, 2022	1 year, $705,000
SS	Jalen Elliott	Detroit Lions	August 2, 2022	1 year, $825,000
SS	Brad Hawkins	Atlanta Falcons	August 2, 2022	1 year, $705,000
CB	Devin Hafford	Pittsburgh Maulers (USFL)	August 14, 2022	1 year, $705,000
TE	Jalen Wydermyer	Buffalo Bills	August 18, 2022	1 year, $705,000

Indicates that the player was a free agent at the end of his respective team's 2021 season.

=== Releases/waivers ===
Position	Player	Date released/waived
OLB	Kyle Van Noy	March 7, 2022
HB	Devine Ozigbo	May 3, 2022
OLB	Terez Hall	May 5, 2022
G	Liam Shanahan	May 13, 2022
CB	Devin Hafford	May 16, 2022
QB	D'Eriq King	May 16, 2022
K	Quinn Nordin	June 10, 2022
LS	Ross Reiter	July 18, 2022
DT	Byron Cowart	July 22, 2022
C	Darryl Williams	July 26, 2022
P	Jake Julien	August 16, 2022
SS	Jalen Elliott	August 20, 2022
CB	Devin Hafford	August 20, 2022
TE	Dalton Keene	August 21, 2022
TE	Devin Asiasi	August 30, 2022
CB	Justin Bethel	August 30, 2022
G	Drew Desjarlais	August 30, 2022
G	Yasir Durant	August 30, 2022
C	James Ferentz	August 30, 2022
G	Arlington Hambright	August 30, 2022
WR	Josh Hammond	August 30, 2022
HB	Kevin Harris	August 30, 2022
SS	Brad Hawkins	August 30, 2022
WR	Lil'Jordan Humphrey	August 30, 2022
MLB	Harvey Langi	August 30, 2022
MLB	Cameron McGrone	August 30, 2022
CB	Terrance Mitchell	August 30, 2022
G	Bill Murray	August 30, 2022
WR	Tre Nixon	August 30, 2022
DT	Jeremiah Pharms Jr.	August 30, 2022
DT	LaBryan Ray	August 30, 2022
C	Kody Russey	August 30, 2022
OT	Will Sherman	August 30, 2022
TE	Matt Sokol	August 30, 2022
HB	J. J. Taylor	August 30, 2022
K	Tristan Vizcaino	August 30, 2022
MLB	Nate Wieland	August 30, 2022
TE	Jalen Wydermyer	August 30, 2022
WR	Lil'Jordan Humphrey	October 11, 2022

=== Retirements ===
Position	Player	Date retired
WR	Malcolm Perry	July 22, 2022
RB	James White	August 11, 2022

=== Trades ===
- March 17 – Defensive end Chase Winovich was traded to the Cleveland Browns in exchange for linebacker Mack Wilson.
- March 17 – Guard Shaq Mason was traded to the Tampa Bay Buccaneers in exchange for a 2022 fifth-round selection (No. 170).
- April 5 – The Patriots' 2023 third-round selection was traded to the Miami Dolphins in exchange for wide receiver DeVante Parker and a 2022 fifth-round selection.
- May 13 – Jarrett Stidham and a 2023 seventh-round selection were traded to the Las Vegas Raiders in exchange for a 2023 sixth-round selection.
- July 13 – Wide receiver N'Keal Harry was traded to the Chicago Bears in exchange for a 2024 seventh-round selection.
- September 21 – Offensive tackle Justin Herron and a 2024 seventh-round selection were traded to the Las Vegas Raiders in exchange for a 2024 sixth-round selection.

== Draft ==
2022 New England Patriots Draft
Round	Selection	Player	Position	College	Notes
1	29	Cole Strange	G	Chattanooga	from San Francisco via Miami and Kansas City (Note: The Patriots traded a first-round selection (21st overall) to the Kansas City Chiefs in exchange for first-, third-, and fourth-round selections (29th, 94th and 121st overall).)
2	50	Tyquan Thornton	WR	Baylor	from Miami via Kansas City (Note: The Patriots traded second- and fifth-round selections (54th and 158th overall) to the Kansas City Chiefs in exchange for a second-round selection (50th overall).)
3	85	Marcus Jones	CB	Houston	
4	121	Jack Jones	CB	Arizona State	from Miami via Kansas City
4	127	Pierre Strong Jr.	HB	South Dakota State	
4	137	Bailey Zappe	QB	Western Kentucky	from LA Rams via Houston and Carolina (Note: The Patriots traded a third-round selection (94th overall) to the Carolina Panthers in exchange for a fourth-round selection (137th overall) and a 2023 third-round selection.)
6	183	Kevin Harris	RB	South Carolina	from Houston (Note: The Patriots traded a fifth-round selection (170th overall) to the Houston Texans in exchange for sixth- and seventh-round selections (183rd and 245th overall).)
6	200	Sam Roberts	DT	Northwest Missouri State	
6	210	Chasen Hines	G	LSU	from LA Rams (Note: The Patriots traded RB Sony Michel to the Los Angeles Rams in exchange for a sixth-round selection (210th overall) and a 2023 fourth-round selection.)
7	245	Andrew Stueber	G	Michigan	from Dallas via Houston

Draft trades

2022 New England Patriots undrafted free agents
Name	Position	College	Ref.
Devin Hafford	CB	Tarleton State	
Jake Julien	P	Eastern Michigan	
D'Eriq King	QB	Miami (FL)	
DaMarcus Mitchell	DE, OLB	Purdue	
LaBryan Ray	DT	Alabama	
Kody Russey	C	Houston	
Brenden Schooler	FS	Texas	
Liam Shanahan	G	LSU	
Ross Reiter	LS	Colorado State	
Nate Wieland	MLB	Grand Valley State	

== Uniform changes ==
For the first time since the 2012 season, the Patriots wore their red and white "throwback" uniforms for select games. The red jersey and white helmet combination, with the "Pat the Patriot" logo, was last worn regularly in the 1992 New England Patriots season. The Patriots wore it for select games as an alternate uniform starting 2002, but NFL rules restricting teams to wearing the same helmet designs for the entire season were enacted after 2012. When that rule was rescinded for the 2022 season, the Patriots brought back their classic uniforms as an alternate. In week 7 against the Chicago Bears, the Patriots wore silver pants for the first time since the 2019 season, but the red stripes were wider than the previous silver pants to match the blue pants style.

== Staff ==
2022 New England Patriots staff
Front office: Chairman/CEO – Robert Kraft; President – Jonathan Kraft; Director of player personnel – Matt Groh; Personnel coordinator – Brian Smith; Director of scouting – Eliot Wolf; Director of pro scouting – Steve Cargile; Director of college scouting – Camren Williams; Director of scouting administration – Nancy Meier; Director of football/head coach administration – Berj Najarian; Associate director of football administration – Bobby Brown; Director of research – Richard Miller; Head coaches: Head coach – Bill Belichick; Offensive coaches: Offensive assistant/quarterbacks – Joe Judge; Running backs – Vinnie Sunseri; Wide receivers/kick returners – Troy Brown; Wide receivers/NFL coaching fellowship – Ross Douglas; Tight ends – Nick Caley; Senior football advisor/offensive line – Matt Patricia; Assistant offensive line – Billy Yates; Offensive assistant – Tyler Hughes; Offensive assistant – Evan Rothstein	Defensive coaches: Defensive line – DeMarcus Covington; Linebackers – Steve Belichick; Linebackers – Jerod Mayo; Cornerbacks – Mike Pellegrino; Safeties – Brian Belichick; NFL coaching fellowship/defense – V'Angelo Bentley; Special teams coaches: Special teams coordinator – Cam Achord; Special teams assistant – Joe Houston; Strength and conditioning: Head strength and conditioning – Moses Cabrera; Strength and conditioning assistant – Deron Mayo; Director of skill development – Joe Kim

== Final roster ==
2022 New England Patriots roster
Quarterbacks (QB): 10 Mac Jones; 4 Bailey Zappe; Running backs (RB): 37 Damien Harris; 36 Kevin Harris; 38 Rhamondre Stevenson; 35 Pierre Strong Jr.; Wide receivers (WR): 15 Nelson Agholor; 84 Kendrick Bourne; 16 Jakobi Meyers; 1 DeVante Parker; 18 Matthew Slater; 11 Tyquan Thornton; 44 Raleigh Webb; Tight ends (TE): 85 Hunter Henry; 81 Jonnu Smith	Offensive linemen (OL): 60 David Andrews C; 77 Trent Brown T; 72 Yodny Cajuste T; 65 James Ferentz C; 75 Conor McDermott T; 71 Michael Onwenu G; 66 Kody Russey C; 69 Cole Strange G; Defensive linemen (DL): 90 Christian Barmore DT; 98 Carl Davis DT; 95 Daniel Ekuale DT; 92 Davon Godchaux DT; 93 Lawrence Guy DE; 97 DaMarcus Mitchell DE; 96 Sam Roberts DE; 91 Deatrich Wise Jr. DE	Linebackers (LB): 8 Ja'Whaun Bentley MLB; 58 Anfernee Jennings OLB; 9 Matthew Judon OLB; 50 Raekwon McMillan MLB; 48 Jahlani Tavai MLB; 55 Josh Uche OLB; 30 Mack Wilson OLB; Defensive backs (DB): 24 Joshuah Bledsoe FS; 27 Myles Bryant CB; 23 Kyle Dugger SS; 39 Tae Hayes CB; 31 Jonathan Jones CB; 25 Marcus Jones CB; 32 Devin McCourty FS; 2 Jalen Mills CB; 3 Jabrill Peppers SS; 21 Adrian Phillips SS; 41 Brenden Schooler FS; 26 Shaun Wade CB; Special teams (ST): 46 Tucker Addington LS; 6 Nick Folk K; 17 Michael Palardy P	Practice squad: 86 Lynn Bowden WR; 99 Jamie Collins OLB; 19 Garrett Gilbert QB; 59 Terez Hall MLB; 29 Brad Hawkins SS; 67 Hayden Howerton G; 34 Quandre Mosely CB; 43 Calvin Munson MLB; 62 Bill Murray G; 82 Tre Nixon WR; 70 Jeremiah Pharms Jr. DT; 74 LaBryan Ray DT (PS/I); 87 Matt Sokol TE; 42 J. J. Taylor RB; 14 Tristan Vizcaino K; 88 Scotty Washington TE (PS/I); Reserve: 7 Jake Bailey P (IR); 61 Marcus Cannon T (IR); 49 Joe Cardona LS (IR); 22 Cody Davis FS (IR); 63 Chasen Hines G (IR); 5 Brian Hoyer QB (IR); 13 Jack Jones CB (IR); 14 Ty Montgomery RB (IR); 13 Quinn Nordin K (NF-Inj.); 51 Ronnie Perkins OLB (IR); 64 Andrew Stueber T (NF-Inj.); 17 Kristian Wilkerson WR (IR); 33 Joejuan Williams CB (IR); 76 Isaiah Wynn T (IR); Rookies in italics 53 active, 14 reserve, 14 practice squad (2 exempt)

== Preseason ==
The Patriots' preseason and regular season opponents and schedule were announced on May 12.

Week	Date	Opponent	Result	Record	Venue	Recap
1	August 11	New York Giants	L 21–23	0–1	Gillette Stadium	Recap
2	August 19	Carolina Panthers	W 20–10	1–1	Gillette Stadium	Recap
3	August 26	at Las Vegas Raiders	L 6–23	1–2	Allegiant Stadium	Recap

== Regular season ==
=== Schedule ===
Week	Date	Opponent	Result	Record	Venue	Recap
1	September 11	at **Miami Dolphins**	**L** 7–20	0–1	Hard Rock Stadium	Recap
2	September 18	at Pittsburgh Steelers	**W** 17–14	1–1	Acrisure Stadium	Recap
3	September 25	Baltimore Ravens	**L** 26–37	1–2	Gillette Stadium	Recap
4	October 2	at Green Bay Packers	**L** 24–27 (OT)	1–3	Lambeau Field	Recap
5	October 9	Detroit Lions	**W** 29–0	2–3	Gillette Stadium	Recap
6	October 16	at Cleveland Browns	**W** 38–15	3–3	FirstEnergy Stadium	Recap
7	October 24	Chicago Bears	**L** 14–33	3–4	Gillette Stadium	Recap
8	October 30	at **New York Jets**	**W** 22–17	4–4	MetLife Stadium	Recap
9	November 6	Indianapolis Colts	**W** 26–3	5–4	Gillette Stadium	Recap
10	Bye					
11	November 20	**New York Jets**	**W** 10–3	6–4	Gillette Stadium	Recap
12	November 24	at Minnesota Vikings	**L** 26–33	6–5	U.S. Bank Stadium	Recap
13	December 1	**Buffalo Bills**	**L** 10–24	6–6	Gillette Stadium	Recap
14	December 12	at Arizona Cardinals	**W** 27–13	7–6	State Farm Stadium	Recap
15	December 18	at Las Vegas Raiders	**L** 24–30	7–7	Allegiant Stadium	Recap
16	December 24	Cincinnati Bengals	**L** 18–22	7–8	Gillette Stadium	Recap
17	January 1	**Miami Dolphins**	**W** 23–21	8–8	Gillette Stadium	Recap
18	January 8	at **Buffalo Bills**	**L** 23–35	8–9	Highmark Stadium	Recap

Note: Intra-division opponents are in bold text.

=== Game summaries ===
==== Week 1: at Miami Dolphins ====
Week 1: New England Patriots at Miami Dolphins – Game summary

Quarter	1	2	3	4	Total
Patriots	0	0	7	0	**7**
**Dolphins**	3	14	3	0	**20**

at Hard Rock Stadium, Miami Gardens, Florida

- Date: September 11
- Game time: 1:00 p.m. EDT
- Game weather: Partly cloudy, 92 °F (33 °C)
- Game attendance: 65,786
- Referee: John Hussey
- TV announcers (CBS): Greg Gumbel, Adam Archuleta and AJ Ross
- Recap, Game Book

Game information

**First quarter**

- MIA – Jason Sanders 43-yard field goal, 4:06. Dolphins 3–0. **Drive: 11 plays, 47 yards, 5:46.**

**Second quarter**

- MIA – Melvin Ingram 2-yard fumble return (Jason Sanders kick), 7:40. Dolphins 10–0.
- MIA – Jaylen Waddle 42-yard pass from Tua Tagovailoa (Jason Sanders kick), 0:18. Dolphins 17–0.

**Third quarter**

- NE – Ty Montgomery 6-yard pass from Mac Jones (Nick Folk kick), 4:44. Dolphins 17–7. **Drive: 15 plays, 92 yards, 8:21.**
- MIA – Jason Sanders 49-yard field goal, 0:19. Dolphins 20–7. **Drive: 8 plays, 50 yards, 4:25.**

**Fourth quarter**

- No scoring plays.

**Top passers**

- NE – Mac Jones – 21/30, 213 yards, TD, INT
- MIA – Tua Tagovailoa – 23/33, 270 yards, TD

**Top rushers**

- NE – Damien Harris – 9 rushes, 48 yards
- MIA – Chase Edmonds – 12 rushes, 25 yards

**Top receivers**

- NE – Jakobi Meyers – 4 receptions, 55 yards
- MIA – Tyreek Hill – 8 receptions, 94 yards

The game featured a slow start, with the first score coming via a Jason Sanders field goal for the Dolphins with 4:06 remaining in the first quarter, and the first touchdown coming on a Melvin Ingram fumble recovery, also for the Dolphins, coming at 7:40 left in the second quarter. The sole offensive touchdown went to the Patriots on a 6-yard reception by Ty Montgomery from Mac Jones, though the Patriots would lose the game 20–7, marking the second year in a row that the Patriots lost to the Dolphins on Opening Day, and the fourth straight loss to them in this rivalry. A late-game back injury to Mac Jones led to some post-game X-rays, but he was cleared to play in Week 2.

==== Week 2: at Pittsburgh Steelers ====
Week 2: New England Patriots at Pittsburgh Steelers – Game summary

Quarter	1	2	3	4	Total
**Patriots**	3	7	7	0	**17**
Steelers	0	3	3	8	**14**

at Acrisure Stadium, Pittsburgh, Pennsylvania

- Date: September 18
- Game time: 1:00 p.m. EDT
- Game weather: Mostly cloudy, 81 °F (27 °C)
- Game attendance: 67,307
- Referee: Land Clark
- TV announcers (CBS): Ian Eagle, Charles Davis and Evan Washburn
- Recap, Game Book

Game information

**First quarter**

- NE – Nick Folk 28-yard field goal, 6:42. Patriots 3–0. **Drive: 13 plays, 71 yards, 6:45**

**Second quarter**

- PIT – Chris Boswell 36-yard field goal, 8:35. Tied 3–3. **Drive: 16 plays, 48 yards, 7:07**
- NE – Nelson Agholor 44-yard pass from Mac Jones (Nick Folk kick), 0:22. Patriots 10–3. **Drive: 8 plays, 74 yards, 2:46**

**Third quarter**

- PIT – Chris Boswell 52-yard field goal, 5:44. Patriots 10–6. **Drive: 7 plays, 25 yards, 3:33**
- NE – Damien Harris 2-yard run (Nick Folk kick), 2:47. Patriots 17–6. **Drive: 3 plays, 10 yards, 1:11**

**Fourth quarter**

- PIT – Pat Freiermuth 8-yard pass from Mitchell Trubisky (Mitchell Trubisky–Diontae Johnson pass), 14:58 Patriots 17–14. **Drive: 9 plays, 75 yards, 2:49**

**Top passer**

- NE – Mac Jones – 21/35, 252 yards, TD, INT
- PIT – Mitchell Trubisky – 21/33, 168 yards, TD, INT

**Top rusher**

- NE – Damien Harris – 11 rushes, 71 yards, TD
- PIT – Najee Harris – 15 rushes, 49 yards

**Top receiver**

- NE – Nelson Agholor – 6 receptions, 110 yards, TD
- PIT – Diontae Johnson – 6 receptions, 57 yards

The Patriots held the Steelers to a three-and-out on the opening drive, and themselves had a 13-play long ball-control focused first drive that resulted in a 28-yard Nick Folk field goal and ate up 6:45 of game clock. The teams traded interceptions on the final two drives of the first period, with the Steelers getting their own field goal off the foot of Chris Boswell to tie the game up at 3–3 with 8:35 left to play in the second quarter. With time running out in the half, Nelson Agholor made a difficult catch while closely covered by the Miami defender to give the Patriots a 10–3 lead going in to half-time. The Patriots would not relinquish the lead; the Steelers bringing it to 17–14 following a Pat Freiermuth reception on the first play of the fourth quarter and a Diontae Johnson reception for the ensuing two-point conversion. The teams then traded punts for the remainder of the game, with the Patriots ending as they started, with another 13-play drive that used up the final 6:33 of game time, to preserve the win. For the 21st year in a row, the Patriots began the year with at least a 1–1 record.

==== Week 3: vs. Baltimore Ravens ====
Week 3: Baltimore Ravens at New England Patriots – Game summary

Quarter	1	2	3	4	Total
**Ravens**	7	7	17	6	**37**
Patriots	0	13	7	6	**26**

at Gillette Stadium, Foxborough, Massachusetts

- Date: September 25
- Game time: 1:00 p.m. EDT
- Game weather: Mostly cloudy, 66 °F (19 °C)
- Game attendance: 65,878
- Referee: Bill Vinovich
- TV announcers (Fox): Joe Davis, Daryl Johnston and Pam Oliver
- Recap, Game Book

Game information

**First quarter**

- BAL – Mark Andrews 5-yard pass from Lamar Jackson (Justin Tucker kick), 4:09. Ravens 7–0. **Drive: 11 plays, 69 yards, 6:23.**

**Second quarter**

- NE – Nick Folk 35-yard field goal, 14:57. Ravens 7–3. **Drive: 7 plays, 62 yards, 4:12.**
- NE – Mac Jones 3-yard run (Nick Folk kick), 5:58. Patriots 10–7. **Drive: 6 plays, 32 yards, 2:14.**
- BAL – Mark Andrews 16-yard pass from Lamar Jackson (Justin Tucker kick), 0:30. Ravens 14–10. **Drive: 9 plays, 75 yards, 5:28.**
- NE – Nick Folk 50-yard field goal, 0:00. Ravens 14–13. **Drive: 5 plays, 43 yards, 0:30.**

**Third quarter**

- NE – Damien Harris 2-yard run (Nick Folk kick), 12:14. Patriots 20–14. **Drive: 7 plays, 75 yards, 2:46.**
- BAL – Josh Oliver 1-yard pass from Lamar Jackson (Justin Tucker kick), 8:39. Ravens 21–20. **Drive: 7 plays, 75 yards, 3:35.**
- BAL – Devin Duvernay 4-yard pass from Lamar Jackson (Justin Tucker kick), 4:41. Ravens 28–20. **Drive: 4 plays, 44 yards, 1:37.**
- BAL – Justin Tucker 56-yard field goal, 2:33. Ravens 31–20. **Drive: 4 plays, 5 yards, 1:31.**

**Fourth quarter**

- NE – Rhamondre Stevenson 1-yard run (run failed), 12:39. Ravens 31–26. **Drive: 9 plays, 75 yards, 4:54.**
- BAL – Lamar Jackson 9-yard run (kick failed), 3:00. Ravens 37–26. **Drive: 7 plays, 73 yards, 2:35.**

**Top passers**

- BAL – Lamar Jackson – 18/29, 218 yards, 4 TD, INT
- NE – Mac Jones – 22/32, 323 yards, 3 INT

**Top rushers**

- BAL – Lamar Jackson – 11 rushes, 107 yards, TD
- NE – Rhamondre Stevenson – 12 rushes, 73 yards, TD

**Top receivers**

- BAL – Mark Andrews – 8 receptions, 89 yards, 2 TD
- NE – DeVante Parker – 5 receptions, 156 yards

In the Patriots home opener against the Ravens, Baltimore scored first on a five-yard reception by Mark Andrews. The Patriots answered with a Nick Folk field goal and, on the next drive, a three-yard quarterback keeper by Mac Jones to bring the Patriots to 10–7. Lamar Jackson hit Mark Andrews for a second touchdown to take the lead back, while Nick Folk hit a 50-yard field goal to bring the Patriots to within one point as time expired at half time. A two-yard Damien Harris run on the opening drive of the second half gave the patriots a 20–14 lead. Baltimore took the lead 21–20 on the next possession, capping their 7-play, 74-yard drive with a 1 yard Jackson to Josh Oliver pass for a touchdown. Baltimore would not relinquish the lead, despite a fourth quarter Rhamondre Stevenson run and missed two-point conversion that brought the Patriots to within five, the Ravens scored on a 9-yard Lamar Jackson run that gave the Ravens their final 37–26 win. Mac Jones suffered a left leg injury at the two-minute warning of the final quarter after throwing his third interception. This was the Pats' first regular season home loss to the Ravens in franchise history, and their first home loss to them since the 2012 AFC Championship game.

==== Week 4: at Green Bay Packers ====
Week 4: New England Patriots at Green Bay Packers – Game summary

Quarter	1	2	3	4	OT	Total
Patriots	3	7	7	7	0	**24**
**Packers**	0	7	10	7	3	**27**

at Lambeau Field, Green Bay, Wisconsin

- Date: October 2
- Game time: 4:25 p.m. EDT/3:25 p.m. CDT
- Game weather: Sunny, 66 °F (19 °C)
- Game attendance: 78,317
- Referee: Adrian Hill
- TV announcers (CBS): Jim Nantz, Tony Romo and Tracy Wolfson
- Recap, Game Book

Game information

**First quarter**

- NE – Nick Folk 37-yard field goal, 9:45. Patriots 3–0. **Drive: 10 plays, 56 yards, 5:15.**

**Second quarter**

- GB – Christian Watson 15-yard run (Mason Crosby kick), 13:00. Packers 7–3. **Drive: 6 plays, 50 yards, 3:03.**
- NE – Jack Jones 40-yard interception return (Nick Folk kick), 0:13. Patriots 10–7.

**Third quarter**

- GB – Robert Tonyan 20-yard pass from Aaron Rodgers (Mason Crosby kick), 9:20. Packers 14–10. **Drive: 10 plays, 81 yards, 5:40.**
- NE – DeVante Parker 25-yard pass from Bailey Zappe (Nick Folk kick), 4:52. Patriots 17–14. **Drive: 7 plays, 75 yards, 4:28.**
- GB – Mason Crosby 38-yard field goal, 0:05. Tied 17–17. **Drive: 8 plays, 59 yards, 4:47.**

**Fourth quarter**

- NE – Damien Harris 5-yard run (Nick Folk kick), 11:14. Patriots 24–17. **Drive: 7 plays, 66 yards, 3:51.**
- GB – Romeo Doubs 13-yard pass from Aaron Rodgers (Mason Crosby kick), 6:14. Tied 24–24. **Drive: 9 plays, 75 yards, 5:00.**

**Overtime**

- GB – Mason Crosby 31-yard field goal, 0:00. Packers 27–24. **Drive: 12 plays, 77 yards, 6:47.**

**Top passers**

- NE – Bailey Zappe – 10/15, 99 yards, TD
- GB – Aaron Rodgers – 21/35, 251 yards, 2 TD, INT

**Top rushers**

- NE – Damien Harris – 18 rushes, 86 yards, TD
- GB – Aaron Jones – 16 rushes, 110 yards

**Top receivers**

- NE – Rhamondre Stevenson – 4 receptions, 23 yards
- GB – Allen Lazard – 6 receptions, 116 yards

Following the injury to Mac Jones the prior week, journeyman backup Brian Hoyer was given the start, but he was taken out of the game on the Patriots second offensive series due to a head injury. At that point, the Patriots were up 3–0 on a Nick Folk field goal. Rookie third-string quarterback Bailey Zappe played the rest of the game. Green Bay took their first lead on a Christian Watson 15-yard run, while the Patriots' Jack Jones returned an interception of an Aaron Rodgers pass 40 yards to give the Patriots a 10–7 lead at halftime. The teams traded scores throughout the second half, with the game going into overtime tied 24–24. The Packers won the overtime coin toss for first possession, then each team was forced into a 3-and-out situation to start the overtime. The Packers then ran a clock-dominating 11-play drive to 13-yard line, and Mason Crosby kicked the game-winning field goal as the clock expired at the end of overtime. Zappe, in his first game action of the season, played efficiently and didn't make any major mistakes, ending the game 10-for-15 with 1 touchdown and no interceptions on 99 yards passing.

==== Week 5: vs. Detroit Lions ====
Week 5: Detroit Lions at New England Patriots – Game summary

Quarter	1	2	3	4	Total
Lions	0	0	0	0	**0**
**Patriots**	3	13	10	3	**29**

at Gillette Stadium, Foxborough, Massachusetts

- Date: October 9
- Game time: 1:00 p.m. EDT
- Game weather: Sunny, 58 °F (14 °C)
- Game attendance: 65,878
- Referee: Craig Wrolstad
- TV announcers (Fox): Kenny Albert, Jonathan Vilma and Shannon Spake
- Recap, Game Book

Game information

**First quarter**

- NE – Nick Folk 37-yard field goal, 8:47. Patriots 3–0. **Drive: 6 plays, 26 yards, 2:22.**

**Second quarter**

- NE – Nick Folk 32-yard field goal, 14:14. Patriots 6–0. **Drive: 11 plays, 83 yards, 6:18.**
- NE – Kyle Dugger 59-yard fumble return (Nick Folk kick), 3:26. Patriots 13–0.
- NE – Nick Folk 44-yard field goal, 0:00. Patriots 16–0. **Drive: 6 plays, 61 yards, 1:46.**

**Third quarter**

- NE – Nick Folk 37-yard field goal, 10:09. Patriots 19–0. **Drive: 9 plays, 56 yards, 4:51.**
- NE – Jakobi Meyers 24-yard pass from Bailey Zappe (Nick Folk kick), 11:51. Patriots 26–0. **Drive: 8 plays, 66 yards, 4:43.**

**Fourth quarter**

- NE – Nick Folk 29-yard field goal, 5:01. Patriots 29–0. **Drive: 7 plays, 57 yards, 4:19.**

**Top passers**

- DET – Jared Goff – 19/35, 229 yards, INT
- NE – Bailey Zappe – 17/21, 188 yards, TD, INT

**Top rushers**

- DET – Jamaal Williams – 15 rushes, 56 yards
- NE – Rhamondre Stevenson – 25 rushes, 161 yards

**Top receivers**

- DET – Josh Reynolds – 6 receptions, 92 yards
- NE – Jakobi Meyers – 7 receptions, 111 yards, TD

For the first time in ten years, the Patriots played in their red throwback uniforms, with the popular Pat the Patriot logo occupying the center of the field. Bailey Zappe, who started the season third on the quarterback depth chart, was given his first start as both Mac Jones (leg) and Brian Hoyer (head) were injured. The Patriots dominated all phases of the game, earning a shutout win 29–0, as running back Rhamondre Stephenson carried the bulk of the Patriots offensive output, accounting for 161 rushing yards on 25 carries, and adding 2 receptions for 14 yards. Zappe again played efficiently, going 17-for-21 with 1 touchdown on 188 yards passing; the lone blemish on his record being an interception that wide receiver Nelson Agholor had in his hands, but lost to free safety DeShon Elliott. On the defensive side of the ball, fan favorite Matthew Judon had two sacks and a forced fumble in the shutout win. As of 2024, this is the last shutout win for the Pats. It was also the Patriots most recent win in the Patriot Pat uniforms until Week 13 of the 2025 season.

==== Week 6: at Cleveland Browns ====
Week 6: New England Patriots at Cleveland Browns – Game summary

Quarter	1	2	3	4	Total
**Patriots**	3	7	14	14	**38**
Browns	3	3	0	9	**15**

at FirstEnergy Stadium, Cleveland, Ohio

- Date: October 16
- Game time: 1:00 p.m. EDT
- Game weather: Sunny, 62 °F (17 °C)
- Game attendance: 67,431
- Referee: Scott Novak
- TV announcers (CBS): Kevin Harlan, Trent Green and Melanie Collins
- Recap, Game Book

Game information

**First quarter**

- NE – Nick Folk 19-yard field goal, 7:31. Patriots 3–0. **Drive: 12 plays, 63 yards, 6:50.**
- CLE – Cade York 39-yard field goal, 3:00. Tied 3–3. **Drive: 9 plays, 54 yards, 4:31.**

**Second quarter**

- NE – Rhamondre Stevenson 31-yard run (Nick Folk kick), 3:23. Patriots 10–3. **Drive: 9 plays, 87 yards, 4:25.**
- CLE – Cade York 48-yard field goal, 0:26. Patriots 10–6. **Drive: 9 plays, 42 yards, 2:57.**

**Third quarter**

- NE – Tyquan Thornton 2-yard pass from Bailey Zappe (Nick Folk kick), 11:22. Patriots 17–6. **Drive: 7 plays, 75 yards, 3:38.**
- NE – Hunter Henry 31-yard pass from Bailey Zappe (Nick Folk kick), 5:32. Patriots 24–6. **Drive: 3 plays, 40 yards, 1:30.**

**Fourth quarter**

- CLE – Cade York 51-yard field goal, 14:35. Patriots 24–9. **Drive: 9 plays, 48 yards, 2:39.**
- CLE – Amari Cooper 15-yard pass from Jacoby Brissett (pass failed), 6:17. Patriots 24–15. **Drive: 8 plays, 65 yards, 2:44.**
- NE – Tyquan Thornton 19-yard run (Nick Folk kick), 4:28. Patriots 31–15. **Drive: 1 play, 19 yards, 0:04.**
- NE – Rhamondre Stevenson 6-yard run (Nick Folk kick), 3:40. Patriots 38–15. **Drive: 3 plays, 8 yards, 0:16.**

**Top passers**

- NE – Bailey Zappe – 24/34, 309 yards, 2 TD
- CLE – Jacoby Brissett – 21/45, 266 yards, TD, 2 INT

**Top rushers**

- NE – Rhamondre Stevenson – 19 rushes, 76 yards, 2 TD
- CLE – Nick Chubb – 12 rushes, 56 yards

**Top receivers**

- NE – DeVante Parker – 4 receptions, 64 yards
- CLE – Donovan Peoples-Jones – 4 receptions, 74 yards

Rookie quarterback Bailey Zappe started his second game in a row under center, and for the first time in his three appearances this season looked like more than a game manager, throwing the ball very well, going 24-for-34 with 2 touchdowns on 309 yards, for a 118.4 passer rating. Rhamondre Stevenson added two touchdowns on the ground and continued to carry the bulk of the Patriots running game, going for 76 yards on 19 carries. Rookie wide receiver Tyquan Thornton played in his much-anticipated first game of the season, and produced immediately, scoring on both a receiving and rushing touchdown. Once again the defense dominated the opponent, with the Browns never leading for the entire game, which the Patriots won 38–15 in which the Browns only touchdown came too late in the game to matter. Matthew Judon ended his 5-game sack streak to start the season, but did contribute four tackles, one for loss, while both Kyle Dugger and Jalen Mills had interceptions.

==== Week 7: vs. Chicago Bears ====
Week 7: Chicago Bears at New England Patriots – Game summary

Quarter	1	2	3	4	Total
**Bears**	10	10	6	7	**33**
Patriots	0	14	0	0	**14**

at Gillette Stadium, Foxborough, Massachusetts

- Date: October 24
- Game time: 8:15 p.m. EDT
- Game weather: Foggy, 56 °F (13 °C)
- Game attendance: 65,878
- Referee: Brad Allen
- TV announcers (WBTS-CD/ESPN): Joe Buck, Troy Aikman and Lisa Salters
- Recap, Game Book

Game information

**First quarter**

- CHI – Cairo Santos 42-yard field goal, 9:02. Bears 3–0. **Drive: 8 plays, 42 yards, 3:52.**
- CHI – Justin Fields 3-yard run (Cairo Santos kick), 2:11. Bears 10–0. **Drive: 7 plays, 56 yards, 4:19.**

**Second quarter**

- NE – Jakobi Meyers 30-yard pass from Bailey Zappe (Nick Folk kick), 9:43. Bears 10–7. **Drive: 4 plays, 55 yards, 2:12.**
- NE – Rhamondre Stevenson 4-yard run (Nick Folk kick), 6:04. Patriots 14–10. **Drive: 3 plays, 50 yards, 1:30.**
- CHI – Khalil Herbert 25-yard pass from Justin Fields (Cairo Santos kick), 1:54. Bears 17–14. **Drive: 9 plays, 75 yards, 4:10.**
- CHI – Cairo Santos 23-yard field goal, 0:00. Bears 20–14. **Drive: 7 plays, 32 yards, 1:32.**

**Third quarter**

- CHI – Cairo Santos 38-yard field goal, 9:47. Bears 23–14. **Drive: 10 plays, 56 yards, 5:13.**
- CHI – Cairo Santos 50-yard field goal, 3:50. Bears 26–14. **Drive: 10 plays, 46 yards, 4:27.**

**Fourth quarter**

- CHI – David Montgomery 1-yard run (Cairo Santos kick), 12:13. Bears 33–14. **Drive: 8 plays, 39 yards, 4:48.**

**Top passers**

- CHI – Justin Fields – 13/21, 179 yards, TD, INT
- NE – Bailey Zappe – 14/22, 185 yards, TD, 2 INT

**Top rushers**

- CHI – Justin Fields – 14 rushes, 82 yards, TD
- NE – Rhamondre Stevenson – 11 rushes, 39 yards, TD

**Top receivers**

- CHI – Darnell Mooney – 3 receptions, 53 yards
- NE – DeVante Parker – 3 receptions, 68 yards

This was the first time in 22 years the Pats lost to the Bears, and their first-ever home loss to them in franchise history. The Bears rushed for 243 yards in the victory.

==== Week 8: at New York Jets ====
Week 8: New England Patriots at New York Jets – Game summary

Quarter	1	2	3	4	Total
**Patriots**	3	3	13	3	**22**
Jets	3	7	0	7	**17**

at MetLife Stadium, East Rutherford, New Jersey

- Date: October 30
- Game time: 1:00 p.m. EDT
- Game weather: Mostly sunny, 59 °F (15 °C)
- Game attendance: 82,823
- Referee: Shawn Smith
- TV announcers (CBS): Ian Eagle, Charles Davis and Evan Washburn
- Recap, Game Book

Game information

**First quarter**

- NYJ – Greg Zuerlein 28-yard field goal, 8:14. Jets 3–0. **Drive: 10 plays, 82 yards, 4:29.**
- NE – Nick Folk 31-yard field goal, 0:00. Tied 3–3. **Drive: 15 plays, 62 yards, 8:14.**

**Second quarter**

- NYJ – Tyler Conklin 8-yard pass from Zach Wilson (Greg Zuerlein kick), 12:00. Jets 10–3. **Drive: 6 plays, 72 yards, 3:00.**
- NE – Nick Folk 42-yard field goal, 0:00. Jets 10–6. **Drive: 5 plays, 16 yards, 0:42.**

**Third quarter**

- NE – Jakobi Meyers 5-yard pass from Mac Jones (Nick Folk kick), 12:07. Patriots 13–10. **Drive: 6 plays, 62 yards, 2:53.**
- NE – Nick Folk 49-yard field goal, 5:23. Patriots 16–10. **Drive: 10 plays, 34 yards, 4:06.**
- NE – Nick Folk 45-yard field goal, 2:39. Patriots 19–10. **Drive: 4 plays, 0 yards, 1:10.**

**Fourth quarter**

- NE – Nick Folk 52-yard field goal, 10:35. Patriots 22–10. **Drive: 4 plays, 4 yards, 1:23.**
- NYJ – Tyler Conklin 9-yard pass from Zach Wilson (Greg Zuerlein kick), 1:51. Patriots 22–17. **Drive: 6 plays, 88 yards, 1:44.**

**Top passers**

- NE – Mac Jones – 24/35, 194 yards, TD, INT
- NYJ – Zach Wilson – 20/41, 355 yards, 2 TD, 3 INT

**Top rushers**

- NE – Rhamondre Stevenson – 16 rushes, 71 yards
- NYJ – Michael Carter – 7 rushes, 26 yards

**Top receivers**

- NE – Jakobi Meyers – 9 receptions, 60 yards, TD
- NYJ – Garrett Wilson – 6 receptions, 115 yards

This win not only marks their 13th straight against the Jets in this rivalry, but also was Bill Belichick's 325th career win, surpassing George Halas for second place in total career wins by a head coach, including the playoffs.

==== Week 9: vs. Indianapolis Colts ====
Week 9: Indianapolis Colts at New England Patriots – Game summary

Quarter	1	2	3	4	Total
Colts	0	0	3	0	**3**
**Patriots**	0	13	3	10	**26**

at Gillette Stadium, Foxborough, Massachusetts

- Date: November 6
- Game time: 1:00 p.m. EST
- Game weather: Mostly cloudy, 75 °F (24 °C)
- Game attendance: 65,878
- Referee: Clay Martin
- TV announcers (CBS): Greg Gumbel, Adam Archuleta and AJ Ross
- Recap, Game Book

Game information

**First quarter**

- No scoring plays.

**Second quarter**

- NE – Nick Folk 49-yard field goal, 13:30. Patriots 3–0. **Drive: 6 plays, 42 yards, 2:46.**
- NE – Nick Folk 43-yard field goal, 8:50. Patriots 6–0. **Drive: 7 plays, 19 yards, 3:00.**
- NE – Rhamondre Stevenson 3-yard pass from Mac Jones (Nick Folk kick), 6:12. Patriots 13–0. **Drive: 2 plays, 2 yards, 0:46.**

**Third quarter**

- IND – Chase McLaughlin 40-yard field goal, 8:00. Patiots 13–3. **Drive: 8 plays, 18 yards, 4:40.**
- NE – Nick Folk 43-yard field goal, 4:17. Patriots 16–3. **Drive: 9 plays, 42 yards, 3:43.**

**Fourth quarter**

- NE – Nick Folk 28-yard field goal, 10:10. Patriots 19–3. **Drive: 10 plays, 35 yards, 4:45.**
- NE – Jonathan Jones 17-yard interception return (Nick Folk kick), 3:59. Patriots 26–3.

**Top passers**

- IND – Sam Ehlinger – 15/29, 103 yards, INT
- NE – Mac Jones – 20/30, 147 yards, TD

**Top rushers**

- IND – Sam Ehlinger – 5 rushes, 39 yards
- NE – Rhamondre Stevenson – 15 rushes, 60 yards

**Top receivers**

- IND – Jordan Wilkins – 4 receptions, 15 yards
- NE – Hunter Henry – 5 receptions, 50 yards

With the win (their second straight this season), the Pats won their seventh straight home meeting against the Colts, and are now above .500 for the first time this season.

==== Week 11: vs. New York Jets ====
Week 11: New York Jets at New England Patriots – Game summary

Quarter	1	2	3	4	Total
Jets	0	3	0	0	**3**
**Patriots**	0	3	0	7	**10**

at Gillette Stadium, Foxborough, Massachusetts

- Date: November 20
- Game time: 1:00 p.m. EST
- Game weather: Mostly sunny, 37 °F (3 °C)
- Game attendance: 65,878
- Referee: Carl Cheffers
- TV announcers (CBS): Kevin Harlan, Trent Green and Melanie Collins
- Recap, Game Book

Game information

**First quarter**

- No scoring plays.

**Second quarter**

- NE – Nick Folk 24-yard field goal, 14:57. Patriots 3–0. **Drive: 14 plays, 74 yards, 7:46.**
- NYJ – Greg Zuerlein 45-yard field goal, 9:38. Tied 3–3. **Drive: 9 plays, 46 yards, 5:19.**

**Third quarter**

- No scoring plays.

**Fourth quarter**

- NE – Marcus Jones 84-yard punt return (Nick Folk kick), 0:05. Patriots 10–3.

**Top passers**

- NYJ – Zach Wilson – 9/22, 77 yards
- NE – Mac Jones – 23/27, 246 yards

**Top rushers**

- NYJ – Zach Wilson – 3 rushes, 26 yards
- NE – Damien Harris – 8 rushes, 65 yards

**Top receivers**

- NYJ – Denzel Mims – 2 receptions, 35 yards
- NE – Rhamondre Stevenson – 6 receptions, 56 yards

This win, thanks to a punt return TD with five seconds left in the game, marks the third straight for this season and the 14th straight against the Jets in this rivalry. "Diamonds" by Rihanna was playing after Marcus Jones scored the game-winning punt return touchdown. This would be New England's last three or longer game win streak until 2025.

==== Week 12: at Minnesota Vikings ====
Thanksgiving Day games

Week 12: New England Patriots at Minnesota Vikings – Game summary

Quarter	1	2	3	4	Total
Patriots	10	6	10	0	**26**
**Vikings**	7	9	7	10	**33**

at U.S. Bank Stadium, Minneapolis, Minnesota

- Date: November 24
- Game time: 8:20 p.m. EST/7:20 p.m. CST
- Game weather: None (indoor stadium)
- Game attendance: 66,918
- Referee: Alex Kemp
- TV announcers (NBC): Mike Tirico, Tony Dungy, Jason Garrett and Melissa Stark
- Recap, Game Book

Game information

**First quarter**

- MIN – Justin Jefferson 6-yard pass from Kirk Cousins (Greg Joseph kick), 10:40. Vikings 7–0. **Drive: 8 plays, 80 yards, 4:20.**
- NE – Nelson Agholor 34-yard pass from Mac Jones (Nick Folk kick), 8:21. Tied 7–7. **Drive: 5 plays, 75 yards, 2:19.**
- NE – Nick Folk 34-yard field goal, 1:28. Patriots 10–7. **Drive: 4 plays, 1 yard, 2:00.**

**Second quarter**

- MIN – Greg Joseph 30-yard field goal, 8:29. Tied 10–10. **Drive: 14 plays, 72 yards, 7:59.**
- NE – Nick Folk 46-yard field goal, 5:41. Patriots 13–10. **Drive: 5 plays, 23 yards, 2:48.**
- MIN – T. J. Hockenson 1-yard pass from Kirk Cousins (kick failed, wide right), 1:30. Vikings 16–13. **Drive: 9 plays, 75 yards, 4:11.**
- NE – Nick Folk 23-yard field goal, 0:03. Tied 16–16. **Drive: 9 plays, 70 yards, 1:27.**

**Third quarter**

- NE – Hunter Henry 37-yard pass from Mac Jones (Nick Folk kick), 10:54. Patriots 23–16. **Drive: 8 plays, 75 yards, 4:06.**
- MIN – Kene Nwangwu 97-yard kickoff return (Greg Joseph kick), 10:41. Tied 23–23. **Drive: 0 plays, 0 yards, 0:13.**
- NE – Nick Folk 25-yard field goal, 6:43. Patriots 26–23. **Drive: 9 plays, 69 yards, 3:58.**

**Fourth quarter**

- MIN – Greg Joseph 36-yard field goal, 14:07. Tied 26–26. **Drive: 14 plays, 65 yards, 7:36.**
- MIN – Adam Thielen 15-yard pass from Kirk Cousins (Greg Joseph kick), 9:34. Vikings 33–26. **Drive: 6 plays, 71 yards, 3:32.**

**Top passers**

- NE – Mac Jones – 28/39, 382 yards, 2 TD
- MIN – Kirk Cousins – 30/37, 299 yards, 3 TD, INT

**Top rushers**

- NE – Rhamondre Stevenson – 7 rushes, 36 yards
- MIN – Dalvin Cook – 22 rushes, 42 yards

**Top receivers**

- NE – DeVante Parker – 4 receptions, 80 yards
- MIN – Justin Jefferson – 9 receptions, 139 yards, TD

Despite Mac Jones passing for a career-high 382 yards and two touchdowns, the Patriots were unable to beat Kirk Cousins and the Vikings, losing a Thanksgiving night shootout 33–26. With their 1st loss to Minnesota since 2000, the Patriots fell to 6-6 and finished 1-3 against the NFC North.

==== Week 13: vs. Buffalo Bills ====
Week 13: Buffalo Bills at New England Patriots – Game summary

Quarter	1	2	3	4	Total
**Bills**	3	14	0	7	**24**
Patriots	7	0	0	3	**10**

at Gillette Stadium, Foxborough, Massachusetts

- Date: December 1
- Game time: 8:15 p.m. EST
- Game weather: Clear, 35 °F (2 °C)
- Game attendance: 65,878
- Referee: Shawn Hochuli
- TV announcers (WFXT/Prime Video): Al Michaels, Kirk Herbstreit and Kaylee Hartung
- Recap, Game Book

Game information

**First quarter**

- BUF – Tyler Bass 48-yard field goal, 8:02. Bills 3–0. **Drive: 9 plays, 37 yards, 4:55.**
- NE – Marcus Jones 48-yard pass from Mac Jones (Nick Folk kick), 4:46. Patriots 7–3. **Drive: 5 plays, 75 yards, 3:16.**

**Second quarter**

- BUF – Stefon Diggs 8-yard pass from Josh Allen (Tyler Bass kick), 14:56. Bills 10–7. **Drive: 9 plays, 82 yards, 4:50.**
- BUF – Gabe Davis 8-yard pass from Josh Allen (Tyler Bass kick), 5:27. Bills 17–7. **Drive: 14 plays, 56 yards, 7:46.**

**Third quarter**

- No scoring plays.

**Fourth quarter**

- BUF – Devin Singletary 1-yard run (Tyler Bass kick), 14:31. Bills 24–7. **Drive: 15 plays, 94 yards, 8:55.**
- NE – Nick Folk 39-yard field goal, 1:53. Bills 24–10. **Drive: 17 plays, 57 yards, 5:45.**

**Top passers**

- BUF – Josh Allen – 22/33, 223 yards, 2 TD
- NE – Mac Jones – 22/36, 195 yards, TD

**Top rushers**

- BUF – James Cook – 14 rushes, 64 yards
- NE – Rhamondre Stevenson – 10 rushes, 54 yards

**Top receivers**

- BUF – Stefon Diggs – 7 receptions, 92 yards, TD
- NE – Marcus Jones – 2 receptions, 51 yards, TD

Despite forcing Buffalo to punt for the first time in 23 drives in games played between the two division rivals and scoring on their opening drive, the Patriots struggled on offense throughout the game as they lost to the Bills 24–10. This was the third season in a row the Pats lost to the Bills at home in this rivalry.

==== Week 14: at Arizona Cardinals ====
Week 14: New England Patriots at Arizona Cardinals – Game summary

Quarter	1	2	3	4	Total
**Patriots**	0	10	10	7	**27**
Cardinals	0	13	0	0	**13**

at State Farm Stadium, Glendale, Arizona

- Date: December 12
- Game time: 8:15 p.m. EST/6:15 p.m. MST
- Game weather: None (retractable roof closed)
- Game attendance: 63,251
- Referee: Shawn Smith
- TV announcers (WBZ-TV/ESPN): Joe Buck, Troy Aikman and Lisa Salters
- Recap, Game Book

Game information

**First quarter**

- No scoring plays.

**Second quarter**

- ARI – Matt Prater 33-yard field goal, 14:52. Cardinals 3–0. **Drive: 7 plays, 21 yards, 2:16.**
- NE – Kevin Harris 14-yard run (Nick Folk kick), 11:25. Patriots 7–3. **Drive: 8 plays, 75 yards, 3:27.**
- ARI – Matt Prater 32-yard field goal, 9:35. Patriots 7–6. **Drive: 6 plays, 56 yards, 1:50.**
- ARI – James Conner 10-yard run (Matt Prater kick), 2:59. Cardinals 13–7. **Drive: 7 plays, 63 yards, 3:54.**
- NE – Nick Folk 51-yard field goal, 0:00. Cardinals 13–10. **Drive: 6 plays, 35 yards, 0:32.**

**Third quarter**

- NE – Nick Folk 23-yard field goal, 10:15. Tied 13–13. **Drive: 8 plays, 71 yards, 4:45.**
- NE – Raekwon McMillan 23-yard fumble return (Nick Folk kick), 5:32. Patriots 20–13.

**Fourth quarter**

- NE – Pierre Strong Jr. 3-yard run (Nick Folk kick), 14:09. Patriots 27–13. **Drive: 5 plays, 63 yards, 1:58.**

**Top passers**

- NE – Mac Jones – 24/35, 235 yards, INT
- ARI – Colt McCoy – 27/40, 246 yards, INT

**Top rushers**

- NE – Pierre Strong Jr. – 5 rushes, 70 yards, TD
- ARI – James Conner – 15 rushes, 85 yards, TD

**Top receivers**

- NE – Hunter Henry – 3 receptions, 70 yards
- ARI – DeAndre Hopkins – 11 receptions, 79 yards

The Pats won due to a strong performance by the rushing attack and defense, in addition to Cardinals quarterback Kyler Murray suffering a torn ACL on the third play of the game. Unfortunately, several of New England's starters were also injured during the game, including running back Rhamondre Stevenson, receiver DeVante Parker, and cornerback Jack Jones.

==== Week 15: at Las Vegas Raiders ====
Week 15: New England Patriots at Las Vegas Raiders – Game summary

Quarter	1	2	3	4	Total
Patriots	0	3	10	11	**24**
**Raiders**	3	14	0	13	**30**

at Allegiant Stadium, Paradise, Nevada

- Date: December 18
- Game time: 4:05 p.m. EST/1:05 p.m. PST
- Game weather: None (indoor stadium)
- Game attendance: 62,273
- Referee: Ronald Torbert
- TV announcers (Fox): Kenny Albert, Jonathan Vilma and Shannon Spake
- Recap, Game Book

Game information

**First quarter**

- LV – Daniel Carlson 49-yard field goal, 8:26. Raiders 3–0. **Drive: 12 plays, 42 yards, 6:34.**

**Second quarter**

- NE – Nick Folk 24-yard field goal, 11:51. Tied 3–3. **Drive: 14 play, 82 yards, 7:19.**
- LV – Darren Waller 25-yard pass from Derek Carr (Daniel Carlson kick), 5:18. Raiders 10–3. **Drive: 11 plays, 76 yards, 6:33.**
- LV – Mack Hollins 5-yard pass from Derek Carr (Daniel Carlson kick), 0:04. Raiders 17–3. **Drive: 2 plays, 20 yards, 0:23.**

**Third quarter**

- NE – Kyle Dugger 16-yard interception return (Nick Folk kick), 12:07. Raiders 17–10.
- NE – Nick Folk 47-yard field goal, 1:21. Raiders 17–13. **Drive: 12 play, 69 yards, 6:33.**

**Fourth quarter**

- NE – Nick Folk 54-yard field goal, 12:52. Raiders 17–16. **Drive: 7 play, 15 yards, 1:57.**
- NE – Rhamondre Stevenson 34-yard run (Mac Jones pass to Jakobi Meyers), 3:43. Patriots 24–17. **Drive: 3 play, 76 yards, 1:27.**
- LV – Keelan Cole 30-yard pass from Derek Carr (Daniel Carlson kick), 0:32. Tied 24–24. **Drive: 9 plays, 81 yards, 1:39.**
- LV – Chandler Jones 48-yard fumble return, 0:00. Raiders 30–24.

**Top passers**

- NE – Mac Jones – 13/31, 112 yards
- LV – Derek Carr – 20/38, 231 yards, 3 TD, INT

**Top rushers**

- NE – Rhamondre Stevenson – 19 rushes, 172 yards, TD
- LV – Josh Jacobs – 22 rushes, 93 yards

**Top receivers**

- NE – Jakobi Meyers – 2 receptions, 47 yards
- LV – Keelan Cole – 2 receptions, 50 yards, TD

Despite a strong performance from Rhamondre Stevenson, who returned from injury, and overcoming an early 17–3 deficit, the Patriots allowed the Raiders to tie the game at 24 with a controversial touchdown pass from Derek Carr to Keelan Cole, then lost off a walk-off touchdown by Raiders defensive end and former Patriot Chandler Jones, who intercepted an attempted lateral pass from receiver Jakobi Meyers as time ran out. Notably, the failed lateral play by Stevenson and Meyers at the end of the game, which has gained the monikers the "Lunatic Lateral" and "Col-lateral damage" from the media, happened just over four years after the Miracle in Miami, which was a successful lateral pass play by the Miami Dolphins to defeat the Patriots.

With the Pats' first loss to the Raiders in 20 years, they fell to 7–7 and just outside the playoff picture.

==== Week 16: vs. Cincinnati Bengals ====
Week 16: Cincinnati Bengals at New England Patriots – Game summary

Quarter	1	2	3	4	Total
**Bengals**	12	10	0	0	**22**
Patriots	0	0	6	12	**18**

at Gillette Stadium, Foxborough, Massachusetts

- Date: December 24
- Game time: 1:00 p.m. EST
- Game weather: Sunny, 17 °F (−8 °C)
- Game attendance: 65,878
- Referee: Craig Wrolstad
- TV announcers (CBS): Ian Eagle, Charles Davis and Evan Washburn
- Recap, Game Book

Game information

**First quarter**

- CIN – Tee Higgins 9-yard pass from Joe Burrow (kick failed), 12:24. Bengals 6–0. **Drive: 5 plays, 78 yards, 2:36.**
- CIN – Trenton Irwin 23-yard pass from Joe Burrow (run failed), 5:16. Bengals 12–0. **Drive: 9 plays, 59 yards, 5:19.**

**Second quarter**

- CIN – Evan McPherson 28-yard field goal, 14:51. Bengals 15–0. **Drive: 10 plays, 41 yards, 3:58.**
- CIN – Trenton Irwin 4-yard pass from Joe Burrow (Evan McPherson kick), 0:14. Bengals 22–0. **Drive: 12 plays, 80 yards, 2:02.**

**Third quarter**

- NE – Marcus Jones 69-yard interception return (kick failed), 3:51. Bengals 22–6.

**Fourth quarter**

- NE – Kendrick Bourne 5-yard pass from Mac Jones (pass failed), 12:58. Bengals 22–12. **Drive: 11 plays, 77 yards, 4:53.**
- NE – Jakobi Meyers 48-yard pass from Mac Jones (kick failed), 6:02. Bengals 22–18. **Drive: 7 plays, 67 yards, 3:04.**

**Top passers**

- CIN – Joe Burrow – 40/52, 375 yards, 3 TD, 2 INT
- NE – Mac Jones – 21/33, 240 yards, 2 TD

**Top rushers**

- CIN – Joe Mixon – 16 rushes, 65 yards
- NE – Rhamondre Stevenson – 13 rushes, 30 yards

**Top receivers**

- CIN – Tee Higgins – 8 receptions, 128 yards, TD
- NE – Kendrick Bourne – 6 receptions, 100 yards, TD

With their first loss to Cincinnati since 2013 (first at home since 1986), New England fell to 7-8 and finished 2-2 against the AFC North.

==== Week 17: vs. Miami Dolphins ====
Week 17: Miami Dolphins at New England Patriots – Game summary

Quarter	1	2	3	4	Total
Dolphins	0	7	7	7	**21**
**Patriots**	7	0	9	7	**23**

at Gillette Stadium, Foxborough, Massachusetts

- Date: January 1
- Game time: 1:00 p.m. EST
- Game weather: Partly cloudy, 51 °F (11 °C)
- Game attendance: 65,878
- Referee: Brad Allen
- TV announcers (CBS): Ian Eagle, Charles Davis and Evan Washburn
- Recap, Game Book

Game information

**First quarter**

- NE – Tyquan Thornton 7-yard pass from Mac Jones (Nick Folk kick), 7:15. Patriots 7–0. **Drive: 10 plays, 81 yards, 4:18.**

**Second quarter**

- MIA – Tyreek Hill 2-yard run (Jason Sanders kick), 14:55. Tied 7–7. **Drive: 13 plays, 75 yards, 7:20.**

**Third quarter**

- MIA – Raheem Mostert 2-yard pass from Teddy Bridgewater (Jason Sanders kick), 9:17. Dolphins 14–7. **Drive: 5 plays, 41 yards, 2:45.**
- NE – Nick Folk 49-yard field goal, 4:03. Dolphins 14–10. **Drive: 9 plays, 51 yards, 5:14.**
- NE – Kyle Dugger 39-yard interception return (kick failed), 2:51. Patriots 16–14.

**Fourth quarter**

- NE – Jakobi Meyers 1-yard pass from Mac Jones (Nick Folk kick), 4:37. Patriots 23–14. **Drive: 11 plays, 89 yards, 5:06.**
- MIA – Mike Gesicki 4-yard pass from Skylar Thompson (Jason Sanders kick), 1:04. Patriots 23–21. **Drive: 9 plays, 61 yards, 1:28.**

**Top passers**

- MIA – Skylar Thompson – 12/21, 104 yards, TD, INT
- NE – Mac Jones – 20/33, 203 yards, 2 TD

**Top rushers**

- MIA – Jeff Wilson – 15 rushes, 45 yards
- NE – Rhamondre Stevenson – 8 rushes, 42 yards

**Top receivers**

- MIA – Raheem Mostert – 8 receptions, 62 yards, TD
- NE – Tyquan Thornton – 3 receptions, 60 yards, TD

With the win, the Patriots improved to 8-8 to keep themselves alive in the playoff race. The Pats finished 4-4 at home as a result. This would be New England's last win over Miami until 2025.

==== Week 18: at Buffalo Bills ====
Week 18: New England Patriots at Buffalo Bills – Game summary

Quarter	1	2	3	4	Total
Patriots	7	7	3	6	**23**
**Bills**	7	7	14	7	**35**

at Highmark Stadium, Orchard Park, New York

- Date: January 8
- Game time: 1:00 p.m. EST
- Game weather: Cloudy, 31 °F (−1 °C)
- Game attendance: 70,753
- Referee: Clay Martin
- TV announcers (CBS): Jim Nantz, Tony Romo and Tracy Wolfson
- Recap, Game Book

Game information

**First quarter**

- BUF – Nyheim Hines 96-yard kickoff return (Tyler Bass kick), 14:46. Bills 7–0. **Drive: 0 plays, 0 yards, 0:14.**
- NE – Jakobi Meyers 2-yard pass from Mac Jones (Nick Folk kick), 5:45. Tied 7–7. **Drive: 9 plays, 74 yards, 4:44.**

**Second quarter**

- BUF – Dawson Knox 4-yard pass from Josh Allen (Tyler Bass kick), 14:15. Bills 14–7. **Drive: 13 plays, 75 yards, 6:30.**
- NE – DeVante Parker 2-yard pass from Mac Jones (Nick Folk kick), 3:45. Tied 14–14. **Drive: 9 plays, 74 yards, 5:31.**

**Third quarter**

- NE – Nick Folk 24-yard field goal, 7:06. Patriots 17–14. **Drive: 4 plays, 5 yards, 1:28.**
- BUF – Nyheim Hines 101-yard kickoff return (Tyler Bass kick), 6:53. Bills 21–17. **Drive: 0 plays, 0 yards, 0:13.**
- BUF – John Brown 42-yard pass from Josh Allen (Tyler Bass kick), 1:35. Bills 28–17. **Drive: 7 plays, 81 yards, 3:02.**

**Fourth quarter**

- NE – DeVante Parker 26-yard pass from Mac Jones (pass failed), 11:37. Bills 28–23. **Drive: 8 plays, 85 yards, 4:58.**
- BUF – Stefon Diggs 49-yard pass from Josh Allen (Tyler Bass kick), 8:51. Bills 35–23. **Drive: 4 plays, 60 yards, 2:46.**

**Top passers**

- NE – Mac Jones – 26/40, 243 yards, 3 TD, 3 INT
- BUF – Josh Allen – 19/31, 254 yards, 3 TD, INT

**Top rushers**

- NE – Rhamondre Stevenson – 6 rushes, 54 yards
- BUF – James Cook – 9 rushes, 45 yards

**Top receivers**

- NE – DeVante Parker – 6 receptions, 79 yards, 2 TD
- BUF – Stefon Diggs – 7 receptions, 104 yards, TD

With the loss, along with Miami's win over the Jets, the Patriots were swept by the Bills and they were eliminated from playoff contention while also securing their second losing season since 2020. The Pats ended their season at 8-9, finishing 3-3 against the AFC East and 4-5 on the road.

=== Standings ===
==== Division ====
AFC East
	W	L	T	PCT	DIV	CONF	PF	PA	STK
^{(2)} Buffalo Bills	13	3	0	.813	4–2	9–2	455	286	W7
^{(7)} Miami Dolphins	9	8	0	.529	3–3	7–5	397	399	W1
New England Patriots	8	9	0	.471	3–3	6–6	364	347	L1
New York Jets	7	10	0	.412	2–4	5–7	296	316	L6

==== Conference ====
AFC
#	Team	Division	W	L	T	PCT	DIV	CONF	SOS	SOV	STK
**Division leaders**
1	Kansas City Chiefs	West	14	3	0	.824	6–0	9–3	.453	.422	W5
2	Buffalo Bills	East	13	3	0	.813	4–2	9–2	.489	.471	W7
3	Cincinnati Bengals	North	12	4	0	.750	3–3	8–3	.507	.490	W8
4	Jacksonville Jaguars	South	9	8	0	.529	4–2	8–4	.467	.438	W5
**Wild cards**
5 (Note: LA Chargers claimed the No. 5 seed over Baltimore based on conference record (7–5 vs. 6–6).)	Los Angeles Chargers	West	10	7	0	.588	2–4	7–5	.443	.341	L1
6	Baltimore Ravens	North	10	7	0	.588	3–3	6–6	.509	.456	L2
7 (Note: Miami finished ahead of Pittsburgh based on head-to-head victory, claiming the 7th and final playoff spot.)	Miami Dolphins	East	9	8	0	.529	3–3	7–5	.537	.457	W1
**Did not qualify for the postseason**
8	Pittsburgh Steelers	North	9	8	0	.529	3–3	5–7	.519	.451	W4
9	New England Patriots	East	8	9	0	.471	3–3	6–6	.502	.415	L1
10 (Note: NY Jets and Tennessee finished ahead of Cleveland based on conference record (5–7 vs. 4–8).) (Note: NY Jets finished ahead of Tennessee based on common record (3–3 vs. 2–4 against: Buffalo, Cincinnati, Denver, Green Bay, Jacksonville).)	New York Jets	East	7	10	0	.412	2–4	5–7	.538	.458	L6
11	Tennessee Titans	South	7	10	0	.412	3–3	5–7	.509	.336	L7
12	Cleveland Browns	North	7	10	0	.412	3–3	4–8	.524	.492	L1
13	Las Vegas Raiders	West	6	11	0	.353	3–3	5–7	.474	.397	L3
14	Denver Broncos	West	5	12	0	.294	1–5	3–9	.481	.465	W1
15	Indianapolis Colts	South	4	12	1	.265	1–4–1	4–7–1	.512	.500	L7
16	Houston Texans	South	3	13	1	.206	3–2–1	3–8–1	.481	.402	W1
**Tiebreakers** (Note: When breaking ties for three or more teams under the NFL's rules, they are first broken within divisions, then comparing only the highest ranked remaining team from each division.)
