= Kyle Dugger =

American football player (born 1996)

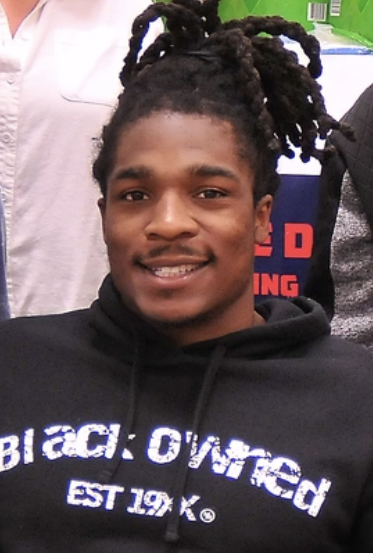
- Dugger in 2023

No. 29 – Cincinnati Bengals
- Position: Safety
- Roster status: Active

Personal information
- Born: March 22, 1996 (age 30); Decatur, Georgia, U.S.
- Listed height: 6 ft 1 in (1.85 m)
- Listed weight: 216 lb (98 kg)

Career information
- High school: Whitewater (Fayetteville, Georgia)
- College: Lenoir–Rhyne (2014–2019)
- NFL draft: 2020: 2nd round, 37th overall pick

Career history
- New England Patriots (2020–2025); Pittsburgh Steelers (2025); Cincinnati Bengals (2026–present)

Awards and highlights
- Cliff Harris Award (2019)

Career NFL statistics as of Week 7, 2026
- Total tackles: 493
- Sacks: 4.5
- Forced fumbles: 3
- Fumble recoveries: 2
- Pass deflections: 30
- Interceptions: 11
- Defensive touchdowns: 4
- Stats at Pro Football Reference

Kyle Dugger (born March 22, 1996) is an American professional football safety for the Cincinnati Bengals of the National Football League (NFL). He played college football for the Lenoir–Rhyne Bears and was selected by the New England Patriots in the second round of the 2020 NFL draft. Dugger also became the highest drafted Division II football player (No. 37 overall) since Kutztown University's John Mobley was selected 15th overall in 1996.

== Early life ==
Dugger primarily played basketball at Whitewater High School in Fayetteville, Georgia. Dugger did not start on the football team until his senior year. Lenoir–Rhyne, an NCAA Division II program in North Carolina, was one of three schools that offered Dugger, along with NCAA Division III member Berry College and NAIA member Reinhardt University.

== College career ==
After redshirting his freshman year, Dugger became an immediate starter in the Bears secondary his redshirt freshman year. He played cornerback during his redshirt freshman season but switched to safety before his sophomore season, which he also redshirted due to a meniscus injury. He recorded three interceptions and three fumble recoveries during his junior season.

Dugger utilized his athleticism during his senior year, at one point returning two punts for touchdowns within a seven-minute span against Virginia–Wise. For his play in his senior season, Dugger was awarded the Cliff Harris Award in 2019, given to the best small-school defensive player. Dugger also participated in the 2020 Senior Bowl, where scouts praised his field instincts.

Scouts praised Dugger for his speed on the field, projecting him at either safety, cornerback or returner in the NFL.

== Professional career ==
=== Pre-draft ===
Dugger was placed onto preseason watch lists prior to his senior season. The majority of draft analysts projected Dugger to be a late second round or early third round pick. Dugger was ranked as the 2nd best strong safety in the draft by Draftscout.com. Dane Brugler of the Athletic had him listed as the third best safety prospect in the entire draft. ESPN analyst Mel Kiper Jr. had Dugger ranked fourth among all safeties. Michael Renner of Pro Football Focus and Steven Ruiz of USA TODAY had Dugger ranked as the fifth best safety available in the draft. NFL draft analyst Daniel Jeremiah had him ranked as the fifth best safety prospect (73rd overall). Kevin Hanson of Sports Illustrated ranked Dugger as the sixth best safety prospect in the draft.

External videos
- Kyle Dugger: NFL Scouting Combine
- Kyle Dugger runs 4.49s 40-yard dash
- Kyle Dugger's College Highlights

Pre-draft measurables
Height	Weight	Arm length	Hand span	Wingspan	40-yard dash	10-yard split	20-yard split	Vertical jump	Broad jump	Bench press	Wonderlic
6 ft 0 7/8 in (1.85 m)	217 lb (98 kg)	32 7/8 in (0.84 m)	10 3/8 in (0.26 m)	6 ft 6 1/2 in (1.99 m)	4.49 s	1.52 s	2.65 s	42.0 in (1.07 m)	11 ft 2 in (3.40 m)	17 reps	23
All values from NFL Combine

=== New England Patriots ===
==== 2020 ====
The New England Patriots selected Dugger in the second round (37th overall) of the 2020 NFL draft. Dugger was the second safety drafted in 2020, one selection behind Xavier McKinney. His selection marked the first time in 18 years a player from Lenoir-Rhyne was drafted since John Milem in 2002. Dugger became the highest drafted player in school history, surpassing Milem who was a 5th round pick, and was only the 7th player drafted from his alma mater since the NFL Draft was established in 1936. He was the first player chosen in that draft who played outside Division I FBS.

External videos
- Patriots select Kyle Dugger No. 37
- ESPN 2020 Draft Profile: Kyle Dugger

On May 20, 2020, the Patriots signed Dugger to a four–year, $8.33 million contract that includes $4.60 million guaranteed upon signing and a signing bonus of $3.61 million.

Throughout training camp, he competed for the role as the primary backup safety against veterans Adrian Phillips, Terrence Brooks, and Cody Davis after the Patriots' longtime starting safety, Duron Harmon, was traded to the Detroit Lions during the off-season. On July 19, 2020, starting strong safety Patrick Chung announced his decision to opt-out of the 2020 NFL season due to the COVID-19 pandemic. Head coach Bill Belichick named Dugger the primary backup safety to begin the season, behind starting duo Adrian Phillips and Devin McCourty.

On September 13, 2020, Dugger made his regular season debut in the New England Patriots' home-opener against the Miami Dolphins, but saw limited snaps in their 21–11 victory. He was inactive for two games (Weeks 7–8) due to an ankle injury. On November 15, 2020, Dugger earned his first career start at free safety with the Patriots' normal starter Devin McCourty moving over to nickelback. He made a season-high 12 combined tackles (seven solo) during a 23–17 victory over the Baltimore Ravens. As a rookie, Dugger appeared in 14 games and started seven, while making 64 combined tackles (43 solo) and one tackle for a loss. He received an overall grade of 64.1 from Pro Football Focus as a rookie in 2020. The New England Patriots finished the 2020 NFL season with a 7–9 record and did not qualify for the playoffs.

==== 2021 ====
Throughout training camp, Dugger learned to play multiple roles at free safety and nickel following the retirement of Patrick Chung after playing 12 seasons. He competed to be the primary backup safety against Jalen Mills. Head coach Bill Belichick named Dugger a backup and listed him as the second free safety on the depth chart, behind Devin McCourty, who was paired with Adrian Phillips to start the regular season. In nickel situations necessitating a fifth defensive back, Dugger would enter the game at free safety with Devin McCourty moving over to nickelback.

On September 12, 2021, Dugger started in the New England Patriots' home-opener against the Miami Dolphins and made seven combined tackles (six solo) during a 17–16 loss. In Week 5, Dugger set a season-high ten combined tackles (five solo) during a 25–22 victory at the Houston Texans. On October 17, 2021, Dugger recorded eight solo tackles, a pass deflection, and had his first career interception on a pass thrown by Dak Prescott to wide receiver Cedrick Wilson during a 29–35 overtime loss to the Dallas Cowboys. The next week, Dugger recorded nine combined tackles (seven solo), made one pass deflection, and had a second consecutive game with an interception on a pass attempt by Mike White in the 54–13 win over the New York Jets. On December 2, 2021, the Patriots officially placed Dugger on the COVID-19/Reserve list, which rendered him inactive during a 14–10 victory at the Buffalo Bills in Week 13. On January 2, 2022, Dugger made two combined tackles (one solo), a pass deflection, and set a career-high with his fourth interception of the season after picking off a pass thrown by Trevor Lawrence as the Patriots routed the Jacksonville Jaguars 50–10. He was sidelined in Week 18 after injuring his hand and the Patriots would lose 24–33 at the Miami Dolphins. He finished the 2021 NFL season with a total of 92 combined tackles (70 solo), five pass deflections, and a career-high four interceptions in 15 games and 13 starts.

The New England Patriots finished the 2021 NFL season second in the AFC East with a 10–7 record and qualified for a Wildcard berth. On January 15, 2022, Dugger started in the first postseason game in his career and recorded four combined tackles (three solo) as the Patriots were routed 17–47 at the Buffalo Bills.

==== 2022 ====
Throughout training camp, he competed against Adrian Phillips and Jabrill Peppers to be the starting strong safety. Head coach Bill Belichick named him and Devin McCourty the starting safeties to begin the season.

He was inactive for the Patriots' 26–37 loss against the Baltimore Ravens due to a knee injury. On October 9, 2022, Dugger made five combined tackles (one solo) and returned a fumble recovery 59–yards for the first touchdown of his career during a 29–0 victory against the Detroit Lions. He scored his touchdown after linebacker Matt Judon had a strip-sack on Jared Goff that Dugger recovered and returned for a 59–yard touchdown during the second quarter. In Week 6, he made eight combined tackles (six solo), set a season-high with two pass deflections, and intercepted a pass by Jacoby Brissett to wide receiver Pharaoh Brown on the opening drive of a 38–15 victory at the Cleveland Browns. On November 20, 2022, he had seven combined tackles (four solo), one pass deflection, and had his first career sack on Zach Wilson for a seven–yard loss as the Patriots defeated the New York Jets 10–3. In Week 12, he set a season-high with nine combined tackles (eight solo) during a 26–32 loss at the Minnesota Vikings. In Week 15, Duggar had six combined tackles (three solo), a pass deflection, and had the first pick-six of his career after intercepting a pass by Derek Carr to wide receiver Davante Adams during a 24–30 loss at the Las Vegas Raiders. On January 1, 2023, Duggar made five combined tackles (three solo), two pass deflections, and intercepted a pass thrown by Teddy Bridgewater to wide receiver Trent Sherfield and returned it 39–yards for a touchdown during a 23–21 win at the Miami Dolphins. His performance earned him AFC Defensive Player of the Week. He led the league with three defensive touchdowns (two interceptions, one fumble recovery). He finished the season with 78 combined tackles (50 solo), eight pass deflections, three interceptions, three touchdowns, one forced fumble, a fumble recovery, and one sack in 15 games and 15 starts. He received an overall grade of 78.4 from Pro Football Focus in 2022.

==== 2023 ====
He returned as the de facto starting strong safety and was paired with Jalen Mills following the retirement of Devin McCourty. On October 1, 2023, he set a career-high with 15 combined tackles (12 solo) as the Patriots lost 3–38 at the Dallas Cowboys. In Week 8, Dugger made nine combined tackles (seven solo), a pass deflection, made his only sack of the season, and intercepted a pass by Tua Tagovailoa to wide receiver Tyreek Hill during a 17–31 loss at the Miami Dolphins. The following week, he made six combined tackles (five solo), a pass deflection, and had his second consecutive game with an interception after picking off a pass thrown by Sam Howell to wide receiver Jahan Dotson during a 17–20 loss against the Washington Commanders in Week 9. He started in all 17 games and had 100 combined tackles (71 solo), seven pass deflections, two interceptions, and 1.5 sacks. He received an overall grade of 61.7 from Pro Football Focus in 2023.

==== 2024 ====
On March 5, 2024, the New England Patriots placed the transition tag on Dugger, giving them the right to match any offer from another team and offering Dugger a one–year, $13.18 million contract.

On April 9, 2024, the New England Patriots signed Dugger to a four–year, $58 million contract extension that includes $32.50 million guaranteed and $29.75 million guaranteed upon signing.

He entered training camp slated as the de facto starting strong safety under new defensive coordinator DeMarcus Covington. Head coach Jerod Mayo named Dugger and Jabrill Peppers as the starting safeties to begin the season. In Week 2, he had nine combined tackles (eight solo) and had his only sack of the season on Geno Smith for a four–yard loss during a 20–23 overtime loss against the Seattle Seahawks. He was inactive during a 10–15 loss to the Miami Dolphins in Week 5 due to an injured ankle. On October 20, 2024, Dugger set a season-high with 11 combined tackles (nine solo) and made one pass deflection during a 16–32 loss at the Jacksonville Jaguars. He injured his ankle again and was subsequently sidelined for three games (Weeks 8–10). He finished the season with 81 combined tackles (55 solo), four pass deflections, and one sack in 13 games and 13 starts. He received an overall grade of 44.3 from Pro Football Focus, which ranked 158th among 171 qualifying safeties in 2024.

==== 2025 ====
In his final seven games with the Patriots, Dugger recorded 17 tackles.

=== Pittsburgh Steelers ===
On October 30, 2025, the Patriots traded Dugger and a 2026 seventh-round pick to the Pittsburgh Steelers in exchange for a 2026 sixth-round pick. Following the acquisition, Pittsburgh amended the final two years of Dugger's contract, enabling him to become a free agent after the season. In Week 11 against the Cincinnati Bengals, Dugger recorded three tackles and an interception that was returned for a 74-yard touchdown in a 34-12 win.

=== Cincinnati Bengals ===
On April 2, 2026, Dugger signed a one-year contract with the Cincinnati Bengals.

== NFL career statistics ==
Legend
	Led the league
**Bold**	Career high

=== Regular season ===
Year	Team	Games		Tackles						Interceptions						Fumbles				
Year	Team	GP	GS	Cmb	Solo	Ast	Sck	TFL	Sfty	Int	Yds	Avg	Lng	TD	PD	FF	Fmb	FR	Yds	TD
2020	NE	14	7	64	43	21	0.0	1	0	0	0	0.0	0	0	0	0	0	0	0	0
2021	NE	15	13	92	70	22	0.0	5	0	**4**	**100**	25.0	37	0	5	0	0	**1**	0	0
2022	NE	15	15	78	50	28	1.0	5	0	3	55	18.3	39	**2**	**8**	**1**	0	**1**	**59**	**1**
2023	NE	17	17	**109**	**71**	**38**	**1.5**	6	0	2	35	17.5	20	0	7	**1**	0	0	0	0
2024	NE	13	13	81	55	26	1.0	**8**	0	0	0	0.0	0	0	4	**1**	0	0	0	0
2025	NE	7	4	17	7	10	0.0	0	0	0	0	0.0	0	0	0	0	0	0	0	0
2025	PIT	9	9	42	22	20	1.0	2	**1**	2	73	**36.5**	**73**	1	5	0	0	0	0	0
2026	CIN	4	0	10	5	5	0.0	0	0	0	0	0.0	0	0	1	0	0	0	0	0
Career		94	78	493	323	170	4.5	27	1	11	263	23.9	73	3	30	3	0	2	59	1

=== Postseason ===
Year	Team	Games		Tackles						Interceptions						Fumbles				
Year	Team	GP	GS	Cmb	Solo	Ast	Sck	TFL	Sfty	Int	Yds	Avg	Lng	TD	PD	FF	Fmb	FR	Yds	TD
2021	NE	1	1	4	**3**	1	0.0	0	0	0	0	0.0	0	0	0	0	0	0	0	0
2025	PIT	1	0	**6**	**3**	**3**	0.0	0	0	0	0	0.0	0	0	0	0	0	0	0	0
Career		2	1	10	6	4	0.0	0	0	0	0	0.0	0	0	0	0	0	0	0	0
