= Jonathan Jones (American football) =

American football player (born 1993)

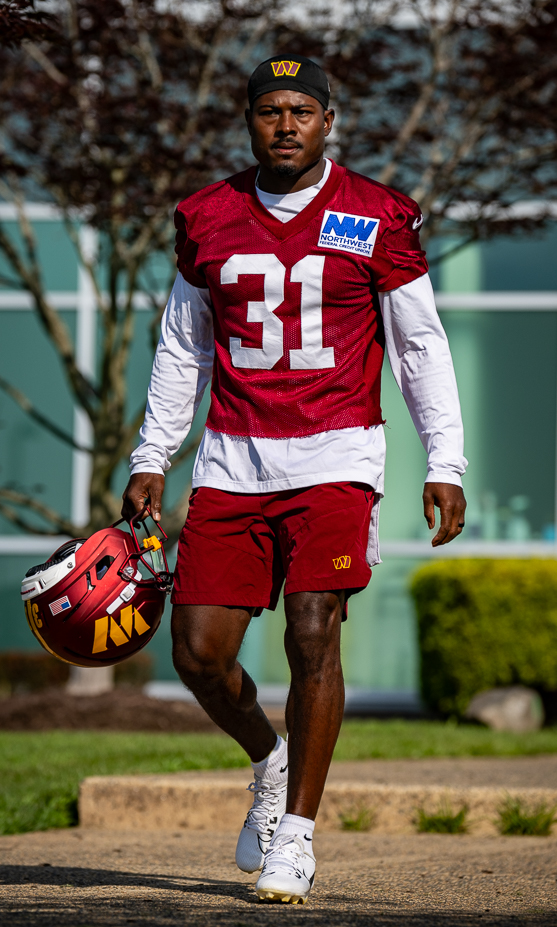
- Jones with the Washington Commanders in 2025

No. 32 – Philadelphia Eagles
- Position: Cornerback
- Roster status: Active

Personal information
- Born: September 20, 1993 (age 33); Carrollton, Georgia, U.S.
- Listed height: 5 ft 9 in (1.75 m)
- Listed weight: 190 lb (86 kg)

Career information
- High school: Carrollton
- College: Auburn (2012–2015)
- NFL draft: 2016: undrafted

Career history
- New England Patriots (2016–2024); Washington Commanders (2025); Philadelphia Eagles (2026–present)

Awards and highlights
- 2× Super Bowl champion (LI, LIII); Second-team All-SEC (2014)

Career NFL statistics as of Week 5, 2026
- Tackles: 482
- Sacks: 3.5
- Forced fumbles: 10
- Fumble recoveries: 2
- Pass deflections: 63
- Interceptions: 11
- Defensive touchdowns: 1
- Stats at Pro Football Reference

Jonathan Isaiah Jones (born September 20, 1993) is an American professional football cornerback for the Philadelphia Eagles of the National Football League (NFL). He played college football for the Auburn Tigers and signed with the New England Patriots as an undrafted free agent in 2016. Jones has also played for the Washington Commanders.

== Early life ==
Jones grew up in Carrollton, Georgia and attended Carrollton High School where he played football and ran track. In 2011, Jones was one of the top high school hurdlers in the country. He placed third in the New Balance Nationals and then won the USA Track and Field Junior Olympics National Championship in the 110-meter hurdles.

== College career ==
Jones was a four-year starter at cornerback at Auburn, and saw his first action as a true freshman in 2012. In August 2013, Jones broke his ankle and played in only five games his sophomore season. In 2014, he earned second-team All-Southeastern Conference (SEC) honors and was ninth in the nation with six interceptions and 17 passes defended, he would again earn second-team All-SEC notice during his 2015 senior year. He had 129 career tackles and seven interceptions in his four years with the Tigers.

== Professional career ==
Jones was projected to be a fourth or fifth round draft pick by NFL draft experts and analysts, but went undrafted in the 2016 NFL draft possibly due to his lack of height, despite an impressive combine, being a top performer at the 40-yard dash where he posted a 4.28 time on his first attempt and bench press.

Pre-draft measurables
Height	Weight	Arm length	Hand span	Wingspan	40-yard dash	10-yard split	20-yard split	20-yard shuttle	Three-cone drill	Vertical jump	Broad jump	Bench press
5 ft 9 1/8 in (1.76 m)	186 lb (84 kg)	30 1/4 in (0.77 m)	8 3/4 in (0.22 m)	6 ft 0 1/8 in (1.83 m)	4.33 s	1.47 s	2.50 s	4.25 s	7.25 s	36 in (0.91 m)	10 ft 3 in (3.12 m)	19 reps
All values from NFL Combine

=== New England Patriots ===
==== 2016 ====
On May 1, 2016, the New England Patriots signed Jones to a three–year, $1.63 million contract that included a signing bonus of $10,000 as an undrafted free agent.

Throughout training camp, he competed for a roster spot as a backup cornerback against Justin Coleman, Brock Vereen, E. J. Biggers, Cre'Von LeBlanc, V'Angelo Bentley, and Darryl Roberts. After a strong performance throughout training camp and the preseason, head coach Bill Belichick named him a backup and listed him as the fifth cornerback on the depth chart to begin the season, behind Logan Ryan, Malcolm Butler, Cyrus Jones, and Justin Coleman.

On September 11, 2016, Jones made his professional regular season debut in the New England Patriots' season-opener at the Arizona Cardinals, but was limited to special teams and recorded one solo tackle as they won 23–21. In Week 5, Jones earned his first snaps on defense after surpassing Justin Coleman on the depth chart. He recorded one solo tackle and had his first pass deflection during a 33–13 win at the Cleveland Browns. On December 18, 2016, Jones earned his first career start as a nickelback and set a season-high with three combined tackles (two solo), while also recovering a fumble on a muffed punt by returner Jordan Norwood during a 16–3 victory at the Denver Broncos. He finished his rookie season with a total of 14 combined tackles (ten solo), one pass deflection, one forced fumble, and a fumble recovery in 16 games and one start.

The New England Patriots finished the 2016 NFL season first in the AFC East with a 14–2 record to earn a first-round bye. On January 14, 2017, Jones appeared in his first career playoff game, but was limited to special teams as the Patriots defeated the Houston Texans 24–16 in the Divisional Round. On January 22, 2016, Jones recorded three solo tackles in the AFC Championship Game as the Patriots defeated the Pittsburgh Steelers 26–17. On February 5, 2017, Jones appeared in Super Bowl LI and recorded one solo tackle as the Patriots defeated the Atlanta Falcons in a unprecedented 25 point comeback victory, by a score of 34–28 in overtime.

==== 2017 ====
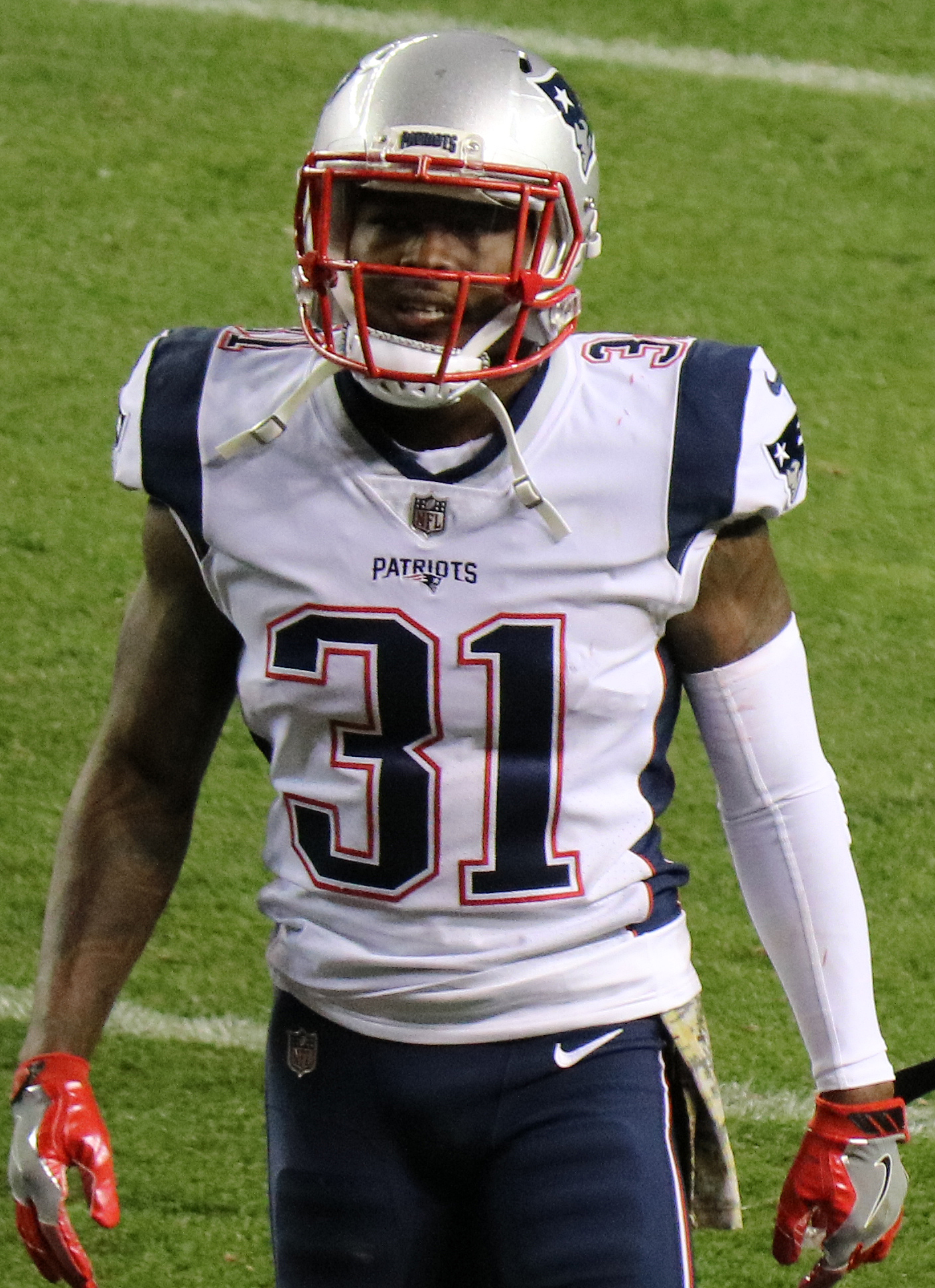
Jones with the New England Patriots in 2017

He entered training camp as a slated to be a backup cornerback and competed for a primary role against Eric Rowe, Justin Coleman, Cyrus Jones, and Kenny Moore II. He was named a backup and listed as the fourth cornerback on the depth chart to begin the season, behind Stephon Gilmore, Malcolm Butler, and Eric Rowe.

On October 29, 2017, Jones set a season-high with two pass deflections and made his first career interception on a pass by Philip Rivers to wide receiver Travis Benjamin during the final seconds of the game to secure a 21–13 win against the Los Angeles Chargers. In Week 12, Jones set a season-high with nine solo tackles, recovered a fumble, and had his first career sack on Matt Moore for a 15–yard loss as the Patriots defeated the Miami Dolphins 35–17. He finished the season with a total of 44 combined tackles (39 solo), eight pass deflections, a fumble recovery, and one sack in 16 games and four starts.

The New England Patriots finished first in the AFC East in 2017 with a 13–3 record to clinch a first-round bye. On January 13, 2018, Jones recorded two solo tackles before exiting in the first quarter of a 35–14 victory against the Tennessee Titans in the Divisional Round. On January 17, 2018, the Patriots placed him on injured reserve and he was subsequently inactive for the last two playoff games. The New England Patriots would advance to Super Bowl LII, but lost 41–33 to the Philadelphia Eagles.

==== 2018 ====
He began training camp on the PUP list after he underwent surgery for an ankle injury he sustained the previous season. On August 7, 2018, the Patriots removed him from the PUP list and placed him on the active roster. He was a possible candidate to earn a role as a backup and on special teams, but had to compete against many, including undrafted rookie J. C. Jackson. Head coach Bill Belichick named Jones a backup and listed him as the fourth cornerback on the depth chart to begin the season, following Stephon Gilmore, Eric Rowe, and Jason McCourty.

On September 30, 2018, Jones set a season-high with eight combined tackles (five solo) as the Patriots routed the Miami Dolphins 38–7. In Week 5, Jones recorded five solo tackles, set a season-high with two pass deflections, and helped secure the Patriots' 38–24 victory against the Indianapolis Colts after intercepting a pass by Andrew Luck to wide receiver Zach Pascal toward the end of the fourth quarter. He appeared in all 16 games in 2018, with five starts, and finished with a total of 56 combined tackles (44 solo), seven pass deflections, three interceptions, and 1.5 sacks.

The New England Patriots finished a top of the AFC East for the third consecutive season and earned a first-round bye with a 11–5 record.

The Patriots would defeat the Los Angeles Chargers 41–28, but Jones would see minimal snaps in the Divisional Round. On January 20, 2019, Jones earned his first start in the postseason and recorded two solo tackles and made one pass deflection as the Patriots defeated the Kansas City Chiefs in overtime 37–31 in the AFC Championship Game. The Patriots tasked Jones to cover and shut down the Kansas City Chiefs' wide receiver Tyreek Hill, who is also known for his speed. Hill would only be targeted three times by quarterback Patrick Mahomes, but was limited to one reception. His performance earned him receiving credit as a 'big reason why' the Patriots defeated the Chiefs and advanced to the Super Bowl. On February 3, 2019, Jones started in Super Bowl LIII and recorded eight combined tackles (six solo) as the Patriots defeated the Los Angeles Rams, 13–3, to give Jones his second Super Bowl championship.

==== 2019 ====
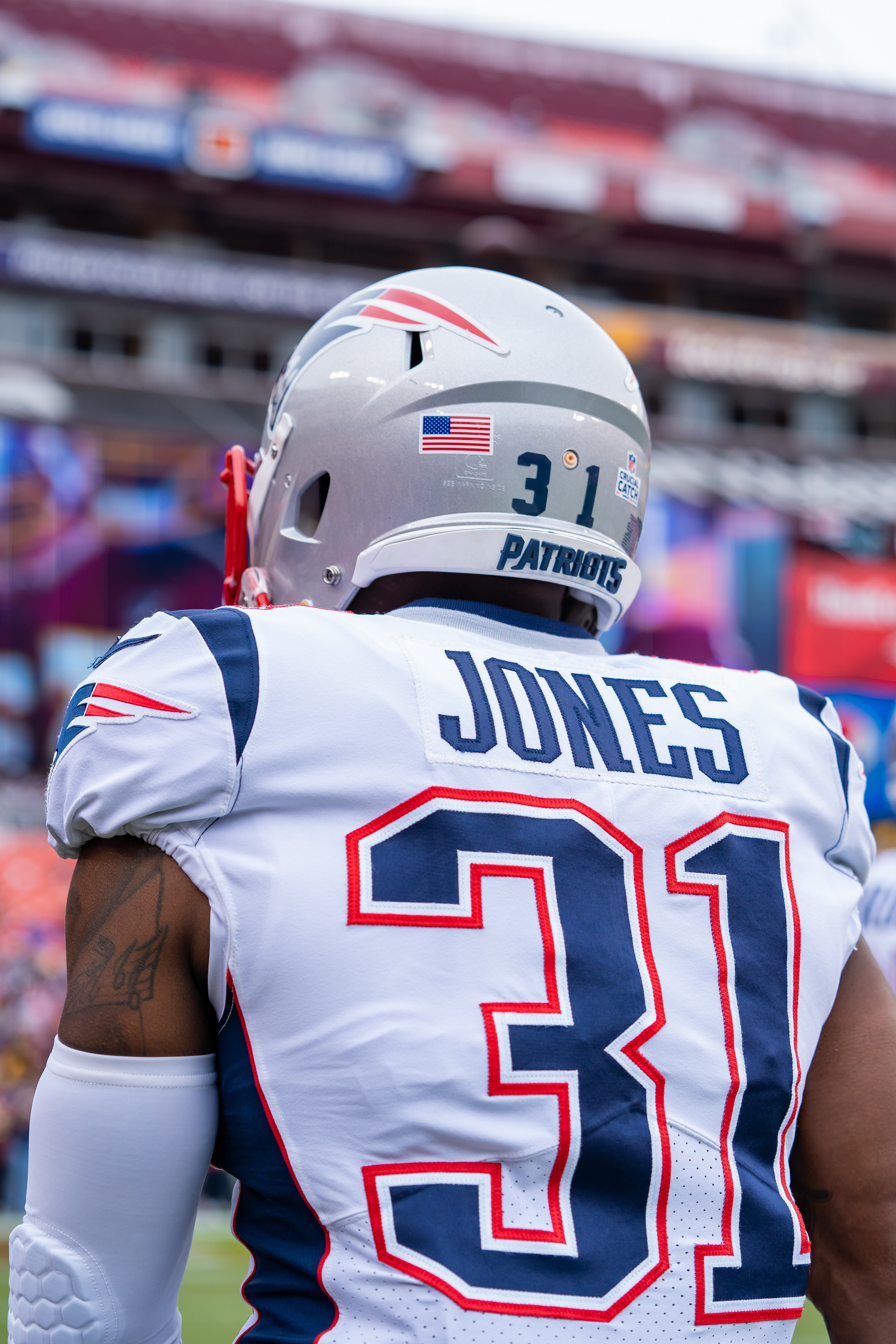
Jones with the Patriots in 2019

On March 12, 2019, the New England Patriots placed a second–round restricted free agent tender. On April 15, 2019, the New England Patriots signed Jones to a one–year, $3.09 million contract as a restricted free agent. On September 7, 2019, the New England Patriots signed Jones to a three–year, $21.00 million contract extension that included $13.00 million guaranteed, $11.99 million guaranteed upon signing, and an initial signing bonus of $8.07 million. Their agreement kept him under contract throughout the 2022 season.

Throughout training camp, he competed to earn the role as the No. 2 starting cornerback against Jason McCourty and J. C. Jackson. Head coach Bill Belichick named him as a backup and listed him as the third cornerback on the depth chart to begin the season, behind Stephon Gilmore and Jason McCourty.

On September 8, 2019, Jones started in the New England Patriots' home-opener against the Pittsburgh Steelers as a nickelback and recorded three combined tackles (two solo) and set a season-high with two pass deflections as they won 33–3. In Week 7, he set a season-high with six combined tackles (five solo) as the Patriots routed the New York Jets 33–0. The following week, he recorded six combined tackles (two solo), made one pass deflection, and forced a fumble by running back Nick Chubb which was recovered by teammate Devin McCourty in their 27–13 win against the Cleveland Browns. He was inactive for the Patriots' 24–17 win against the Buffalo Bills due to a groin injury. He finished the 2019 NFL season with a total of 53 combined tackles (38 solo), eight pass deflections, and a forced fumble in 15 games and nine starts.

==== 2020 ====
During training camp, he competed for a role as a starting cornerback against Justin Bethel and J.C. Jackson. He was named the No. 2 starting cornerback to begin the season and played across Stephon Gilmore. On October 18, 2020, Jones recorded four combined tackles (three solo), set a new season-high with three pass deflections, and intercepted a pass by Drew Lock to wide receiver Tim Patrick during a 18–12 loss to the Denver Broncos. In Week 16, he set a new season-high with eight combined tackles (seven solo) as the Patriots lost 9–38 against the Buffalo Bills. He finished the season with a total of 74 combined tackles (60 solo), six pass deflections, and two interceptions in 16 games and seven starts. He received an overall grade of 80.7 from Pro Football Focus in 2020.

==== 2021 ====
Throughout training camp, he competed to be a starting cornerback against J. C. Jackson and Jalen Mills following the departure of Jason McCourty and an injury to Stephon Gilmore. Head coach Bill Belichick named him a backup and listed him as the third cornerback on the depth chart to begin the season, behind J. C. Jackson and Jalen Mills. On September 12, 2021, Jones appeared in the New England Patriots' home-opener against the Miami Dolphins and made one pass deflection and had his lone interception of the season on a pass by Tua Tagovailoa to wide receiver Albert Wilson during a 17–16 loss. In Week 4, he set a season-high with nine combined tackles (seven solo) as the Patriots lost 17–19 to the Tampa Bay Buccaneers. On October 17, 2021, Jones recorded three combined tackles (two solo) and had one pass break up before exiting during the fourth quarter of a 29–35 overtime loss against the Dallas Cowboys due to a shoulder injury. On October 23, 2021, the Patriots officially placed him on injured reserve for the remainder of the season after he underwent shoulder surgery. He finished the 2021 NFL season with 20 combined tackles (15 solo), three pass deflections, and one interception in six games and one start.

==== 2022 ====
He entered training camp projected to be a starting cornerback following the departure of J. C. Jackson. He returned from injuries and was moved to playing outside corner instead of covering the slot following the arrival of Marcus Jones. He was named the No. 1 starting cornerback to begin the season and started alongside Jalen Mills and nickelback Marcus Jones.

He was inactive for the Patriots' 38–15 victory at the Cleveland Browns in Week 6 due to an ankle injury. On November 6, 2022, Jones made one solo tackle, one pass deflection, and returned an interception thrown by Sam Ehlinger to tight end Kylen Granson for 17–yards to score his first career touchdown during a 26–3 win against the Indianapolis Colts. In Week 12, he recorded seven combined tackles (six solo), set a season-high with three pass deflections, and intercepted a pass by Kirk Cousins to wide receiver K. J. Osborn during a 26–33 loss at the Minnesota Vikings. In Week 16, he set a new season-high with eight solo tackles as the Patriots lost 18–22 to the Cincinnati Bengals. The following week, Jones made four combined tackles (three solo), two pass deflections, and set a career-high with his fourth interception of the season on a pass by Skylar Thompson to wide receiver Tyreek Hill during a 23–21 win against the Miami Dolphins in Week 17. He finished the season with 69 combined tackles (56 solo), a career-high 11 pass deflections, a career-high four interceptions, three forced fumbles, and one touchdown in 16 games and 16 starts. He received an overall grade of 85.6 from Pro Football Focus in 2022.

==== 2023 ====
On March 13, 2023, the New England Patriots signed Jones to a two–year, $19.00 million contract that included $13.00 million guaranteed and a signing bonus of $7.50 million. He returned to training camp slated as the No. 1 starting cornerback. Head coach Bill Belichick named him and Christian Gonzalez the starting cornerbacks to begin the regular season.

He was inactive for three consecutive games (Weeks 2–4) due to an ankle injury. In Week 14, he set a season-high with six solo tackles during a 21–18 victory at the Pittsburgh Steelers. In Week 18, Jones set a season-high with seven combined tackles (five solo) as the Patriots lost 3–17 to the New York Jets. He finished the season with 48 combined tackles (40 solo) and seven pass deflections in 14 games and 14 starts. He received an overall grade of 76.5 from Pro Football Focus in 2023.

==== 2024 ====
On January 12, 2024, the New England Patriots announced their decision to promote inside linebackers coach Jerod Mayo to head coach following the departure of Bill Belichick. Defensive coordinator DeMarcus Covington chose to retain Jones and Christian Gonzalez as the starting cornerbacks to begin the season. In Week 2, he set a season-high with eight combined tackles (six solo) during a 20–23 overtime loss to the Seattle Seahawks. Entering Week 16, Jones was demoted and replaced as a starting cornerback by Alex Austin for the last three games of the season. He finished the 2024 NFL season with a total of 58 combined tackles (41 solo) and six pass deflections in 17 games and 14 starts. He received an overall grade of 60.7 from Pro Football Focus, which ranked 117th among 222 qualifying cornerbacks in 2024.

=== Washington Commanders ===
On March 14, 2025, the Washington Commanders signed Jones to a one–year, $5.50 million contract that includes $4.50 million guaranteed upon signing and an initial signing bonus of $2.50 million. The Commanders placed him on injured reserve with a hamstring injury on September 17. Jones was activated on October 18, ahead of Washington's Week 7 matchup against the Dallas Cowboys.

=== Philadelphia Eagles ===
On March 19, 2026, Jones signed a one-year, $2 million contract with the Philadelphia Eagles.

== NFL career statistics ==
Legend
	Won the Super Bowl
**Bold**	Career high

=== Regular season ===
Year	Team	Games		Tackles					Interceptions						Fumbles	
Year	Team	GP	GS	Cmb	Solo	Ast	Sck	TFL	Int	Yds	Avg	Lng	TD	PD	FF	FR
2016	NE	16	1	14	10	4	0.0	1	0	0	0.0	0	0	1	1	**1**
2017	NE	16	4	44	39	5	1.0	**2**	1	6	6.0	6	0	8	0	**1**
2018	NE	16	5	56	44	12	**1.5**	1	3	34	11.3	24	0	7	1	0
2019	NE	15	9	53	38	15	0.0	0	0	0	0.0	0	0	8	2	0
2020	NE	16	7	**74**	**60**	14	0.0	0	2	0	0.0	0	0	6	1	0
2021	NE	6	1	20	15	5	0.0	0	1	0	0.0	0	0	3	0	0
2022	NE	16	16	69	56	13	0.0	0	**4**	**89**	**22.3**	**55**	**1**	**11**	**3**	0
2023	NE	14	14	48	40	8	0.0	0	0	0	0.0	0	0	7	0	0
2024	NE	17	14	58	41	**17**	0.0	0	0	0	0.0	0	0	6	2	0
2025	WAS	12	7	41	30	11	1.0	1	0	0	0.0	0	0	5	0	0
2026	PHI	5	0	5	4	1	0.0	0	0	0	0.0	0	0	1	0	0
Career		149	78	482	377	105	3.5	5	11	129	11.7	55	1	63	10	2

=== Postseason ===
Year	Team	Games		Tackles					Interceptions						Fumbles	
Year	Team	GP	GS	Cmb	Solo	Ast	Sck	TFL	Int	Yds	Avg	Lng	TD	PD	FF	FR
2016	NE	3	0	4	4	0	0.0	0	0	0	0.0	0	0	0	0	0
2017	NE	1	0	2	2	0	0.0	0	0	0	0.0	0	0	0	0	0
2018	NE	3	2	**10**	**8**	**2**	**1.0**	**1**	0	0	0.0	0	0	**1**	0	0
2019	NE	1	0	4	3	1	0.0	0	0	0	0.0	0	0	**1**	0	0
Career		8	2	20	17	3	1.0	1	0	0	0.0	0	0	2	0	0
