= List of Northwest Missouri State Bearcats in the NFL draft =

The Northwest Missouri Bearcats football team, representing Northwest Missouri State University, has had 7 players selected in the National Football League (NFL) since the league began holding drafts in 1936). This includes one player selected in the third round.

Each NFL franchise seeks to add new players through the annual NFL Draft. The draft rules were last updated in 2009. The team with the worst record from the previous year picks first, the next-worst team second, and so on. Teams that did not make the playoffs are ordered by their regular-season record with any remaining ties broken by strength of schedule. Playoff participants are sequenced after non-playoff teams, based on their round of elimination (wild card, division, conference, and Super Bowl).

== Key ==
B	Back	K	Kicker	NT	Nose tackle
C	Center	LB	Linebacker	FB	Fullback
DB	Defensive back	P	Punter	HB	Halfback
DE	Defensive end	QB	Quarterback	WR	Wide receiver
DT	Defensive tackle	RB	Running back	G	Guard
E	End	T	Offensive tackle	TE	Tight end

*	Selected to a Pro Bowl
†	Won an NFL championship
‡	Selected to a Pro Bowl and won an NFL championship

== Players selected ==
Year	Round	Pick	Player name	Position	NFL team	Notes
1992	11	306	Ed Tillison	FB	Detroit Lions	—
1999	7	239	Chris Greisen	QB	Arizona Cardinals	—
2003	3	75	Seth Wand	T	Houston Texans	—
2006	7	253	Dave Tollefson	DE	Green Bay Packers	—
2008	6	179	Xavier Omon	RB	Buffalo Bills	—
2014	6	195	Brandon Dixon	CB	New York Jets	—
2022	6	200	Sam Roberts	DE	New England Patriots	—
