= Brenden Schooler =

American football player (born 1997)

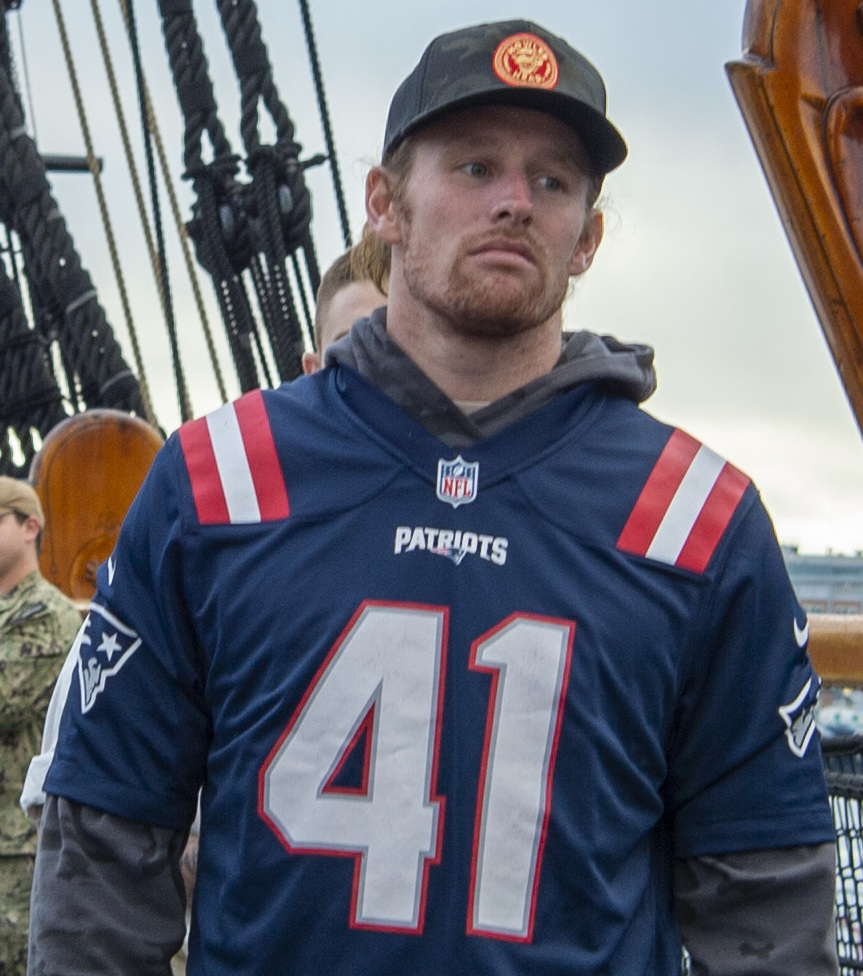
- Schooler with the New England Patriots in 2022 aboard the USS Constitution

No. 41 – New England Patriots
- Positions: Safety, Special teamer
- Roster status: Active

Personal information
- Born: May 30, 1997 (age 29); Dana Point, California, U.S.
- Listed height: 6 ft 2 in (1.88 m)
- Listed weight: 210 lb (95 kg)

Career information
- High school: Mission Viejo (Mission Viejo, California)
- College: Oregon (2016–2019); Texas (2020–2021)
- NFL draft: 2022: undrafted

Career history
- New England Patriots (2022–present)

Awards and highlights
- First-team All-Pro (2024); Pro Bowl (2024); PFWA All-Rookie Team (2022); 2× First-team All-Pac-12 (2017, 2018)

Career NFL statistics as of 2025
- Total tackles: 59
- Sacks: 2.0
- Fumble recoveries: 4
- Stats at Pro Football Reference

Brenden Schooler (born May 30, 1997) is an American professional football safety and special teamer for the New England Patriots of the National Football League (NFL). He was signed as an undrafted free agent by the Patriots in 2022. Schooler played college football for the Oregon Ducks and Texas Longhorns, where he was both a safety and wide receiver.

== College career ==
Schooler played for four years at Oregon, from 2016 to 2019, where he played both safety and wide receiver. In 2020 he briefly transferred to Arizona, but left after the 2020 Pac-12 football season was cancelled due to the COVID-19 pandemic, transferring to Texas, where he played in 2020 and 2021.

== Professional career ==
Pre-draft measurables
Height	Weight	Arm length	Hand span	Wingspan	40-yard dash	10-yard split	20-yard split	20-yard shuttle	Three-cone drill	Vertical jump	Broad jump	Bench press
6 ft 1 5/8 in (1.87 m)	203 lb (92 kg)	32 1/2 in (0.83 m)	8 1/2 in (0.22 m)	6 ft 6 7/8 in (2.00 m)	4.43 s	1.57 s	2.59 s	4.10 s	6.71 s	37.5 in (0.95 m)	10 ft 8 in (3.25 m)	16 reps
All values from Pro Day

=== 2022 ===
At his pro day in Texas, Schooler ran the 40-yard dash in 4.43 seconds and the three-cone drill in 6.71 seconds. After going undrafted, Schooler was signed by the New England Patriots in May 2022 to a three-year contract, the standard for undrafted rookies, including a $15,000 signing bonus.

Schooler was one of two undrafted rookies to make the 2022 team, extending the Patriots' streak of undrafted free agents making the team to 19 seasons.

In the Patriots' Week 2 victory over the Pittsburgh Steelers, Schooler recovered a muffed punt by former Patriots All-Pro Gunner Olszewski, after the Steelers had only 10 men on the field for the play. The Patriots scored the winning touchdown on the subsequent drive. Schooler recovered a second muff in the Patriots' Week 6 win over the Cleveland Browns; a viral video showed him trying to present the ball to head coach Bill Belichick during the game. Schooler also recovered a punt blocked by Jonathan Jones in the Patriots' win over the Indianapolis Colts in Week 9. He was named to the PFWA All-Rookie Team.

=== 2023 ===
Schooler was one of two special teamers selected for the NFLPA All Pro team for the 2023-2024 season by his fellow players. Schooler recorded 13 tackles and one fumble recovery in the 2023 season.

=== 2024 ===
On October 11, 2024, Schooler and the Patriots agreed to a three–year, $9 million contract extension. In the Patriots' Week 10 win over the Chicago Bears, Schooler recorded his first sack at any level of competition against Caleb Williams. Schooler finished the 2024 season with 13 total tackles and 2.0 sacks. He was selected to his first Pro Bowl as a special teamer.
