= Marcus Jones (cornerback) =

American football player (born 1998)

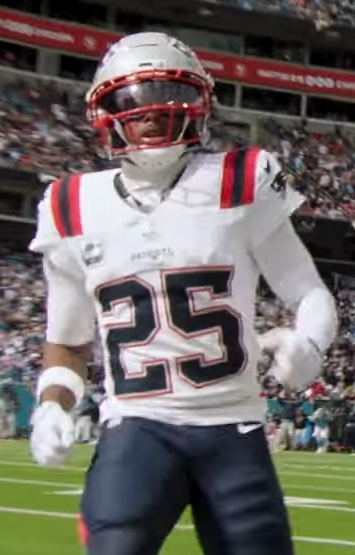
- Jones with the New England Patriots in 2025

No. 25 – New England Patriots
- Positions: Cornerback, punt returner
- Roster status: Active

Personal information
- Born: October 22, 1998 (age 28); Baton Rouge, Louisiana, U.S.
- Listed height: 5 ft 8 in (1.73 m)
- Listed weight: 188 lb (85 kg)

Career information
- High school: Enterprise (Enterprise, Alabama)
- College: Troy (2017–2018); Houston (2019–2021)
- NFL draft: 2022: 3rd round, 85th overall pick

Career history
- New England Patriots (2022–present)

Awards and highlights
- First-team All-Pro (2022) (Note: Selected as a punt returner); Second-team All-Pro (2025) (Note: Selected as a punt returner); NFL punt return yards leader (2022); PFWA All-Rookie Team (2022); Paul Hornung Award (2021); Jet Award (2021); Consensus All-American (2021); First-team All-American (2020); AAC Special Teams Player of the Year (2021); Sun Belt Freshman of the Year (2017); 2× First-team All-AAC (2020, 2021) (Note: Selected as a return specialist.); Second-team All-AAC (2021) (Note: Selected as a cornerback.); First-team All-Sun Belt (2018); Second-team All-Sun Belt (2017)

Career NFL statistics as of Week 10, 2026
- Total tackles: 218
- Sacks: 3.0
- Fumble recoveries: 7
- Pass deflections: 34
- Interceptions: 7
- Receiving yards: 96
- Rushing yards: 5
- Return yards: 1,954
- Total touchdowns: 6
- Stats at Pro Football Reference

Marcus Elliot Jones (born October 22, 1998) is an American professional football cornerback, punt returner and slot receiver for the New England Patriots of the National Football League (NFL). He played college football for the Troy Trojans and the Houston Cougars. Jones was selected by the Patriots in the third round of the 2022 NFL draft.

== Early life ==
Jones grew up in Enterprise, Alabama and attended Enterprise High School, where he played basketball and football. He was named all-state as a senior after recording 27 tackles with five interceptions and 16 passes broken up on defense and returning three punts and one kickoff for touchdowns.

== College career ==
=== Troy ===
==== 2017 season ====
Jones began his college football career at Troy University in 2017. He was named the Sun Belt Conference Freshman of the Year and second-team all-conference as a return specialist after returning 30 kickoffs for 879 yards and three touchdowns and 14 for 121 yards while also intercepting two passes on defense, one of which was returned for a touchdown.

==== 2018 season ====
As a sophomore in 2018, he was named first-team All-Sun Belt as a return specialist after returning 23 kickoffs for 584 yards and one touchdown and to the second-team as a cornerback after breaking up eight passes with one interception.

=== Houston ===
==== 2019 season ====
After his sophomore season, Jones entered the NCAA transfer portal and later announced that he would be transferring to the University of Houston in 2019. He sat out one season and redshirt due to NCAA transfer rules, maintaining his junior status for the 2020 season.

==== 2020 season ====
Jones had 24 tackles, 2.0 tackles for loss, and one interception on defense during his redshirt junior season in 2020. Jones was also named first-team All-American Athletic Conference as a return specialist after leading the nation with 337 yards on 17 punt returns with one returned for a touchdown.

==== 2021 season ====
During his redshirt senior season in 2021, Jones returned a kickoff 100 yards for a touchdown with 17 seconds left against 19th-ranked SMU to win the game 44–37. To cap off the season he won the Paul Hornung Award, given to the nation's most versatile player, and was selected to the Associated Press All-America first-team as a defensive back. He also won American Athletic Conference (AAC) Special Teams Player of the Year along with being named first-team All-AAC as a return specialist and second-team All-AAC as a cornerback.

== Professional career ==
=== Pre-draft ===
Pre-draft measurables
Height	Weight	Arm length	Hand span	Wingspan
5 ft 8 in (1.73 m)	174 lb (79 kg)	28 7/8 in (0.73 m)	8 7/8 in (0.23 m)	5 ft 9 3/4 in (1.77 m)
All values from NFL Combine

=== 2022: First All-Pro selection ===
Jones was selected by the New England Patriots in the third round (85th overall) of the 2022 NFL draft.

In Week 11 against the New York Jets, with five seconds left in the game, Jones made a game-winning 84-yard punt return touchdown in the 10–3 win. It was the first punt return touchdown in the NFL for the 2022 season. In the Patriots' Week 13 game against the Buffalo Bills on Thursday Night Football, Jones scored his first career offensive touchdown on a 48-yard catch-and-run reception, on the first offensive snap of his career. It was the first receiving touchdown from scrimmage by a defensive back since the Jets' Marcus Coleman in 2000, also against the Bills. In the Patriots' Christmas Eve game against the Cincinnati Bengals, Jones scored on a 69-yard pick-six, making him the first player in 45 seasons to score a touchdown on offense, defense, and special teams in the same season. Officially, Jones was the first player since Bill Dudley and Tom Harmon (both in 1947) to accomplish the feat.

Jones finished his rookie season with 39 tackles, seven passes defended, and two interceptions on defense. On offense, he had four receptions for 78 yards and one touchdown. He led the NFL with 362 punt return yards and 12.5 yards per punt return with one punt returned for a touchdown while finishing fifth in the league with 645 kick return yards. Jones was named first-team All-Pro as a punt returner by the Associated Press, and he was additionally selected to the PFWA All-Rookie Team.

=== 2023: Shoulder injury ===
In Week 2 of the 2023 season, Jones suffered a shoulder injury and was placed on injured reserve on September 22, 2023.

=== 2024: Return from injury ===
Jones returned in 2024 as the starting slot corner and primary punt returner. He played in 14 games with nine starts, recording 58 tackles, 10 pass deflections, and one interception.

=== 2025: Second All-Pro selection ===
In Week 4 of the 2025 season against the Carolina Panthers, Jones had an 88-yard punt return for a touchdown. Jones broke the franchise single-game record for punt return yards with 167 yards on three returns, set by Mike Haynes' 156 yards in a 1976 game, and was named AFC Special Teams Player of the Week. In Week 6, against the New Orleans Saints, Jones recorded his first career sack on quarterback Spencer Rattler in the 25–19 win. In Week 7, Jones intercepted Tennessee Titans quarterback Cam Ward in the Patriots' 31–13 win. On October 28, Jones agreed to a three-year, $36 million extension with the Patriots, which will keep him with the team through the 2028 season. On October 30, Jones was named AFC Defensive Player of the Month. In Week 12, Jones recorded his second career pick-six, also against the Cincinnati Bengals. In Week 13, in the Monday Night Football game against the New York Giants, he returned a punt for 94 yards for a touchdown.

He finished the 2025 season playing in all 17 games with eight starts, recording 65 tackles, 8 tackles for loss, one sack, 11 pass deflections, and three interceptions with one touchdown. As a punt returner, Jones returned 21 punts for 363 yards and two touchdowns. He was named to the second-team All-Pro as a punt returner.

In the divisional round game against the Houston Texans, Jones scored on a 26-yard pick-six off C. J. Stroud to retake the lead. New England won 28–16. He had seven total tackles in Super Bowl LX, a 29–13 loss to the Seattle Seahawks.

== Career statistics ==
=== NFL ===
Legend
	Led the league
**Bold**	Career high

==== Regular season ====
Defense

Year	Team	Games		Tackles					Interceptions						Fumbles			
Year	Team	GP	GS	Cmb	Solo	Ast	TFL	Sck	PD	Int	Yds	Avg	Lng	TD	FF	FR	Yds	TD
2022	NE	15	4	39	34	5	2	0.0	7	2	**87**	**43.5**	**69**	**1**	0	1	0	0
2023	NE	2	1	5	4	1	0	0.0	0	0	0	—	0	0	0	1	0	0
2024	NE	14	**9**	58	**48**	10	1	0.0	10	1	35	35.0	35	0	0	2	**17**	0
2025	NE	**17**	8	**65**	47	**18**	**8**	**2.0**	**11**	**3**	65	21.7	33	**1**	0	**3**	0	0
2026	NE	10	7	51	31	20	3	1.0	6	1	12	12.0	12	0	0	0	0	0
Career		58	29	218	164	54	14	3.0	34	7	199	28.4	69	2	0	7	17	0

Offense and special teams

Year	Team	Games		Receiving					Kick returns					Punt returns				
Year	Team	GP	GS	Rec	Yds	Avg	Lng	TD	Ret	Yds	Avg	Lng	TD	Ret	Yds	Avg	Lng	TD
2022	NE	15	4	**4**	**78**	**19.5**	**48**	**1**	**27**	**645**	**23.9**	**46**	0	**29**	362	12.5	84	1
2023	NE	2	1	0	0	0.0	0	0	0	0	0.0	0	0	3	21	7.0	21	0
2024	NE	14	**9**	1	18	18.0	18	0	0	0	0.0	0	0	26	**386**	14.8	62	0
2025	NE	**17**	8	0	0	0.0	0	0	0	0	0.0	0	0	21	363	**17.3**	**94**	**2**
2026	NE	10	7	0	0	0.0	0	0	0	0	0.0	0	0	18	177	9.8	26	0
Career		58	29	5	96	19.2	48	1	27	645	23.9	46	0	97	1,309	13.5	94	3

==== Postseason ====
Defense

Year	Team	Games		Tackles					Interceptions						Fumbles			
Year	Team	GP	GS	Cmb	Solo	Ast	TFL	Sck	PD	Int	Yds	Avg	Lng	TD	FF	FR	Yds	TD
2025	NE	4	2	21	18	3	0	1.0	4	1	26	26.0	26	1	1	0	0	0
Career		4	2	21	18	3	0	1.0	4	1	26	26.0	26	1	1	0	0	0

Offense and special teams

Year	Team	Games		Receiving					Kick returns					Punt returns				
Year	Team	GP	GS	Rec	Yds	Avg	Lng	TD	Ret	Yds	Avg	Lng	TD	Ret	Yds	Avg	Lng	TD
2025	NE	4	2	0	0	0.0	0	0	0	0	0.0	0	0	9	61	6.8	24	0
Career		4	2	0	0	0.0	0	0	0	0	0.0	0	0	9	61	6.8	24	0

=== College ===
Year	Team	GP	Tackles					Interceptions					Fumbles			Kick returns				Punt returns			
Year	Team	GP	Solo	Ast	Cmb	TfL	Sck	Int	Yds	Avg	TD	PD	FR	FF	TD	Ret	Yds	Avg	TD	Ret	Yds	Avg	TD
2017	Troy	**13**	34	**15**	**49**	**2.0**	0.0	2	**110**	**55.0**	**1**	6	0	0	0	**30**	**879**	29.3	**3**	14	115	8.2	0
2018	Troy	11	23	10	33	0.0	0.0	1	0	0.0	0	8	**1**	0	0	23	584	25.4	1	6	49	8.2	0
2019	Houston	0	Sat out due to NCAA transfer portal rules and redshirt																				
2020	Houston	7	18	6	24	**2.0**	0.0	1	22	22.0	0	4	0	0	0	5	102	20.4	0	17	337	**19.8**	1
2021	Houston	**13**	**36**	11	47	1.0	0.0	**5**	2	0.4	0	**13**	0	**1**	0	15	510	**34.0**	2	**26**	**374**	14.4	**2**
Career		44	111	42	153	5.0	0.0	9	134	14.9	1	31	1	1	0	73	2,075	28.4	6	63	875	13.9	3

== Career highlights ==
=== Awards and honors ===
NFL

- First-team All-Pro (2022) (Note: Selected as a punt returner)
- Second-team All-Pro (2025) (Note: Selected as a punt returner)
- NFL punt return yards leader (2022)
- PFWA All-Rookie Team (2022)

College

- Paul Hornung Award (2021)
- Jet Award (2021)
- Consensus All-American (2021)
- First-team All-American (2020)
- AAC Special Teams Player of the Year (2021)
- Sun Belt Freshman of the Year (2017)
- 2× First-team All-AAC (2020, 2021) (Note: Selected as a return specialist.)
- Second-team All-AAC (2021) (Note: Selected as a cornerback.)
- First-team All-Sun Belt (2018)
- Second-team All-Sun Belt (2017)

=== Records ===
==== Patriots franchise records ====
- Most punt return yards in a single game: 167 (September 28, 2025 vs. Carolina Panthers)
