= Sam Roberts (American football) =

American football player (born 1998)

Profile
- Position: Defensive end

Personal information
- Born: April 14, 1998 (age 28); Waynesville, Missouri, U.S.
- Listed height: 6 ft 5 in (1.96 m)
- Listed weight: 300 lb (136 kg)

Career information
- High school: Waynesville
- College: Northwest Missouri State (2016–2021)
- NFL draft: 2022: 6th round, 200th overall pick

Career history
- New England Patriots (2022–2023); Chicago Bears (2024)*; Carolina Panthers (2024–2025); Atlanta Falcons (2025); New York Giants (2026)*
- * Offseason or practice squad member only

Awards and highlights
- 2× First-team All-MIAA (2019, 2021); Second-team All-MIAA (2020); Cliff Harris Award (2021); MIAA Defensive Player of the Year (2021)

Career NFL statistics as of 2025
- Total tackles: 26
- Sacks: 1
- Stats at Pro Football Reference

Samuel Roberts (born April 14, 1998) is an American professional football defensive end. He played college football for the Northwest Missouri State Bearcats.

== Professional career ==
Pre-draft measurables
Height	Weight	Arm length	Hand span	Wingspan	40-yard dash	10-yard split	20-yard split	Vertical jump	Bench press
6 ft 4 5/8 in (1.95 m)	287 lb (130 kg)	33 1/2 in (0.85 m)	9 1/2 in (0.24 m)	6 ft 9 1/2 in (2.07 m)	5.14 s	1.76 s	2.93 s	30.0 in (0.76 m)	25 reps
All values from Pro Day

=== New England Patriots ===
Roberts was selected by the New England Patriots in the sixth round, 200th overall, of the 2022 NFL draft.

Roberts was released by the Patriots on August 26, 2024.

=== Chicago Bears ===
On August 29, 2024, Roberts was signed to the Chicago Bears' practice squad. He was released on October 1 with an injury settlement.

=== Carolina Panthers ===
On November 18, 2024, Roberts was signed to the Carolina Panthers' practice squad. He was promoted to the active roster on December 10.

Roberts was waived on August 26, 2025, and re-signed to the practice squad.

=== Atlanta Falcons ===
On September 5, 2025, the Atlanta Falcons signed Roberts off of the Panthers' practice squad. He was placed on injured reserve on November 14, due to a knee injury suffered in Week 10 against the Indianapolis Colts.

=== New York Giants ===
On March 23, 2026, Roberts signed with the New York Giants. On August 10, he was waived by New York.
