= DeMarcus Covington =

American football player and coach (born 1989)

Green Bay Packers
- Title: Outside linebackers coach/run game coordinator/assistant head coach – defense

Personal information
- Born: March 30, 1989 (age 37); Birmingham, Alabama, U.S.

Career information
- Position: Wide receiver
- High school: John Carroll Catholic
- College: Samford (2007-2011)

Career history
- UAB (2012) Defensive graduate assistant; Ole Miss (2013–2014) Defensive graduate assistant; UT Martin (2015) Defensive line coach; Eastern Illinois (2016) Co-defensive coordinator & defensive line coach; New England Patriots (2017–2018) Coaching assistant; New England Patriots (2019) Outside linebackers coach; New England Patriots (2020–2023) Defensive line coach; New England Patriots (2024) Defensive coordinator; Green Bay Packers (2025) Defensive line coach/run game coordinator; Green Bay Packers (2026–present) Outside linebackers coach/run game coordinator/assistant head coach – defense

Awards and highlights
- Super Bowl champion (LIII)
- Coaching profile at Pro Football Reference

DeMarcus Covington (born March 30, 1989) is an American football coach who is the outside linebackers coach, run game coordinator, and assistant head coach – defense for the Green Bay Packers of the National Football League (NFL). He previously served as an assistant coach at the New England Patriots, Eastern Illinois University, the University of Tennessee at Martin, University of Mississippi (Ole Miss) and University of Alabama at Birmingham (UAB).

== Early years ==
Covington played collegiately at wide receiver for the NCAA Division I Football Championship Subdivision (FCS) Samford Bulldogs where he registered 62 receptions for 586 yards and two touchdowns from 2007 to 2010. He graduated from Samford in 2011.

== Coaching career ==
=== College ===
Covington began his coaching career a year after he graduated in 2012 as defensive graduate assistant at the University of Alabama-Birmingham for the Blazers. In 2013 he went to the Southeastern Conference where he spent two seasons as a defensive graduate assistant at Ole Miss. In 2015, Covington coached the defensive line at UT Martin. This was followed by 2016 when he spent the college football season as the co-defensive coordinator and defensive line coach at Eastern Illinois.

=== New England Patriots ===
Covington joined the organization in 2017 and was a coaching assistant for two years before becoming the teams outside linebackers coaching in 2019. He won his first Super Bowl title when the Patriots defeated the Los Angeles Rams in Super Bowl LIII. In 2020 he was moved to coaching the defensive line. On February 1, 2024, he was promoted to defensive coordinator. Covington was not retained by the Patriots upon the hiring of Mike Vrabel.

=== Green Bay Packers ===
On January 30, 2025, Covington was hired to serve as the defensive line coach for the Green Bay Packers. On March 19, 2026, Covington was shifted to the role of outside linebackers coach.

== Personal life ==
Covington and wife, Natasha have two sons, Cassius and Cayman. Covington created Next Level in 2012, a non-profit football camp that serves as an outlet to the youth of his home town of Birmingham, Alabama, for a full day of football-related drills and activities.
