= 2019 New England Patriots season =

60th season in Patriots franchise history; final one with Tom Brady

- Owner: Robert Kraft
- Head coach: Bill Belichick
- Offensive coordinator: Josh McDaniels
- Home stadium: Gillette Stadium

Results
- Record: 12–4
- Division place: 1st AFC East
- Playoffs: Lost Wild Card Playoffs (vs. Titans) 13–20
- All-Pros: LG Joe Thuney (2nd team); CB Stephon Gilmore (1st team); ST Matthew Slater (1st team)
- Pro Bowlers: 3: CB Stephon Gilmore; LB Dont'a Hightower; ST Matthew Slater

Uniform
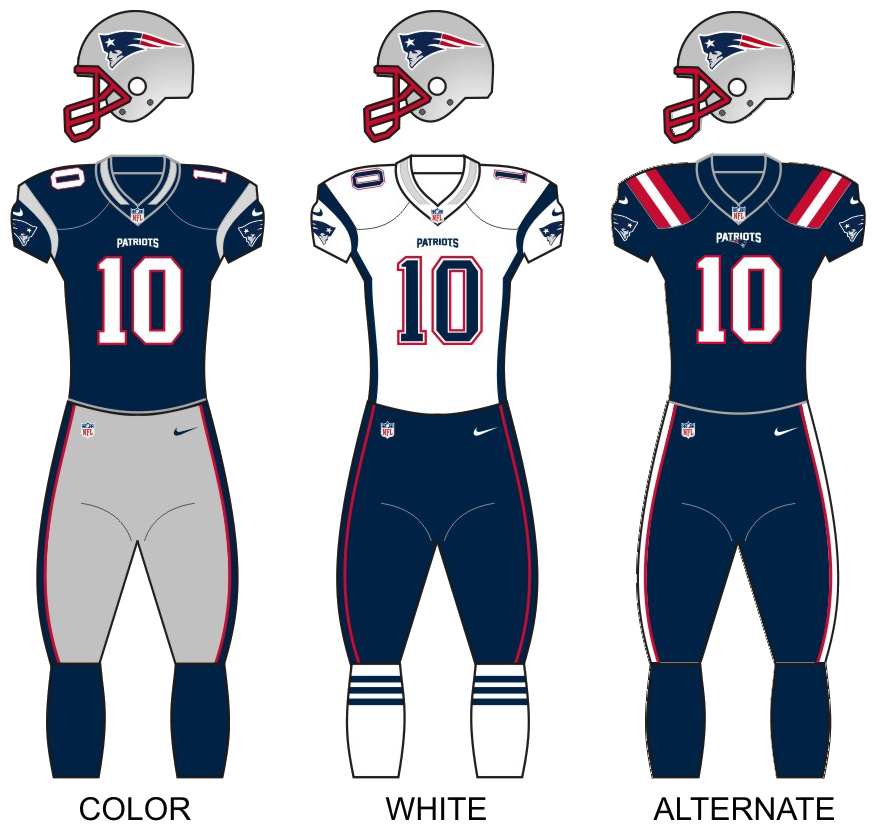

The 2019 season was the New England Patriots' 50th in the National Football League (NFL), their 60th overall and their 20th under head coach Bill Belichick. They entered the season as the defending Super Bowl champions, after winning Super Bowl LIII, and as three-time defending AFC champions. The Patriots won the AFC East for the 11th straight season, and improved on their 11–5 record from the previous season, but they were upset by the Tennessee Titans in the Wild Card game, their first Wild Card game since the 2009 season. This marked the first time the Patriots lost a home postseason game since the 2012 AFC Championship Game where they lost to the later Super Bowl champion Ravens 28–13, and the first time the Patriots failed to reach the AFC Championship Game since 2010. The Patriots were also the only NFL team that won their division, made the playoffs, and had a winning season, in every year of the 2010s decade.

Catalyzed by their defense's historically dominant play, the Patriots started the season extremely well at 8–0 for the third time in franchise history, and early on there was conversation as to if they could repeat the undefeated 2007 regular season. However, their winning streak would soon end as a result of their Week 9 loss to the Baltimore Ravens, which was also their first loss to the Ravens since the 2012 AFC Championship game. In Week 12, the Patriots set a new NFL record with their 17th consecutive 10-win season, surpassing the San Francisco 49ers, who set the original record of 16 consecutive 10-win seasons from 1983–1998.

For the first time since 2009, Rob Gronkowski, the team's former starting tight end, was not on the active roster as he announced his retirement on March 24, 2019. Also, for the first time since 2010, the Patriots had a different kicker on the regular season roster as the struggling Stephen Gostkowski was placed on IR; he was replaced by midseason signings Mike Nugent, Nick Folk, and Kai Forbath. Long-time assistant Brian Flores was not part of the Patriots coaching staff for the first time since 2003, as he left to become the head coach of the Miami Dolphins on February 4, 2019.

With their win over the Buffalo Bills in Week 16, the Patriots clinched the AFC East for the 11th consecutive year. However, despite entering December with a 10–1 record, the Patriots failed to clinch a first-round bye for the first time since 2009 thanks to a late-season collapse that culminated in Week 17 with a 27–24 loss to the 4–11 Dolphins while the Kansas City Chiefs defeated the Los Angeles Chargers. The Patriots' loss and the Chiefs' win gave the Chiefs the #2 seed in the playoffs. It was the Patriots' first home loss to the Dolphins since 2008 and their first since 2005 with Tom Brady as starting quarterback.

This was also Tom Brady's last season with the team, as he announced he was entering free agency and later signed with the Tampa Bay Buccaneers on March 20, 2020. This was the last year of the Brady–Belichick era.

== Coaching changes ==
On February 4, 2019, de facto defensive coordinator/linebackers coach Brian Flores was hired as the head coach of the Miami Dolphins. The Dolphins also hired wide receivers coach Chad O'Shea to be their offensive coordinator and cornerbacks coach Josh Boyer to serve in that same capacity, in addition to a role as the defensive pass game coordinator.

Defensive line coach Brendan Daly was hired by the Kansas City Chiefs to serve in that same capacity.

In February 2019, it was announced that Greg Schiano was hired to join the Patriots as their defensive coordinator, but prior to the Patriots confirming this report, Schiano unexpectedly resigned from the Patriots on March 28, citing a desire to spend more time on his "faith and family".

To replace these losses, the Patriots hired and promoted individuals. On offense, Mick Lombardi was hired as the assistant quarterbacks coach and Joe Judge was given an additional role to his special teams coordinator as wide receivers coach. On defense, former Patriots' player Jerod Mayo was hired as the inside linebackers coach, Mike Pellegrino was promoted from coaching assistant to cornerbacks coach, Demarcus Covington was promoted from coaching assistant to outside linebackers coach, and Bret Bielema was promoted from consultant to the head coach to the defensive line coach. In addition, the defensive coordinator position was left vacant with head coach Bill Belichick now involving himself more greatly in that role.

== Roster changes ==
=== Free agents ===
==== Unrestricted ====
Position	Player	2019 team	Date signed	Contract
P	Ryan Allen	New England Patriots	March 19, 2019	1 year, $1.5 million
DT	Malcom Brown	New Orleans Saints	March 19, 2019	3 years, $15 million
OT	Trent Brown	Oakland Raiders	March 13, 2019	4 years, $66 million
WR	Phillip Dorsett	New England Patriots	March 19, 2019	1 year, $2.6 million
DE	Trey Flowers	Detroit Lions	March 14, 2019	5 years, $90 million
K	Stephen Gostkowski	New England Patriots	April 9, 2019	2 years, $8.5 million
RB	Jeremy Hill			
WR	Chris Hogan	Carolina Panthers	April 12, 2019	1 year, $1.45 million
WR	Cody Hollister	Tennessee Titans	May 13, 2019	2 years, $1.08 million
LB	Ramon Humber			
OT	Ulrick John	New Orleans Saints	May 13, 2019	1 year, $720,000
LB	Albert McClellan	New York Jets	August 17, 2019	1 year, $645,000
CB	Jason McCourty	New England Patriots	March 14, 2019	2 years, $10 million
WR	Cordarrelle Patterson	Chicago Bears	March 13, 2019	2 years, $8.5 million
CB	Eric Rowe	Miami Dolphins	March 14, 2019	1 year, $3.5 million
DT	Danny Shelton	New England Patriots	May 20, 2019	1 year, $1.03 million
DE	John Simon	New England Patriots	March 15, 2019	2 years, $4.15 million
OT	LaAdrian Waddle	Buffalo Bills	March 16, 2019	1 year, $2 million

==== Restricted ====
Position	Player	2019 team	Date signed	Contract
CB	Jonathan Jones	New England Patriots	April 16, 2019	Tendered for 1 year, $3.095 million
WR	Josh Gordon	New England Patriots	April 23, 2019	Tendered for 1 year, $2.025 million

==== Signings ====
Position	Player	Previous team	Date signed	Contract
RB	Brandon Bolden	Miami Dolphins	March 14, 2019	2 years, $3.7 million
WR	Bruce Ellington	Detroit Lions	March 15, 2019	1 year, $895,000
FS	Terrence Brooks	New York Jets	March 15, 2019	2 years, $3.25 million
WR	Maurice Harris	Washington Redskins	March 15, 2019	1 year, $1 million
DT	Mike Pennel	New York Jets	March 15, 2019	2 years, $5 million
TE	Matt LaCosse	Denver Broncos	March 15, 2019	2 years, $2.8 million
OT	Cedrick Lang	Minnesota Vikings	April 1, 2019	1 year, $500,000
FB	Jakob Johnson	Stuttgart Scorpions (Germany)	April 8, 2019	1 year, $495,000
TE	Austin Seferian-Jenkins	Jacksonville Jaguars	April 10, 2019	1 year, $895,000
WR	Demaryius Thomas	Houston Texans	April 16, 2019	1 year, $2.9 million
DE	Nick Thurman	Tampa Bay Buccaneers	May 2, 2019	1 year, $495,000
LB	Shilique Calhoun	Oakland Raiders	May 2, 2019	1 year, $720,000
TE	Benjamin Watson	New Orleans Saints	May 9, 2019	1 year, $3 million
OT	Jared Veldheer	Denver Broncos	May 13, 2019	1 year, $3.5 million
WR	Dontrelle Inman	Indianapolis Colts	May 13, 2019	1 year, $1.5 million
OLB	Jamie Collins	Cleveland Browns	May 16, 2019	1 year, $3 million
TE	Lance Kendricks	Green Bay Packers	July 24, 2019	1 year, $1.02 million
OG	J.J. Dielman	Los Angeles Rams	July 26, 2019	
WR	Cameron Meredith	New Orleans Saints	August 2, 2019	2 years, $2.02 million
OT	Cole Croston	New England Patriots	August 12, 2019	1 year, $645,000
MLB	Scooby Wright	Arizona Hotshots (AAF)	August 25, 2019	1 year, $570,000
RB	Robert Martin	New York Giants	August 25, 2019	1 year, $495,000
WR	Demaryius Thomas	New England Patriots	September 2, 2019	1 year, $1.5 million
C	James Ferentz	New England Patriots	September 6, 2019	1 year, $720,000
WR	Antonio Brown	Oakland Raiders	September 9, 2019	1 year, $15 million
OT	Marshall Newhouse	New Orleans Saints	September 11, 2019	1 year, $930,000
OT	Caleb Benenoch	Tampa Bay Buccaneers	September 17, 2019	1 year, $720,000
QB	Cody Kessler	Philadelphia Eagles	September 25, 2019	1 year, $720,000
SS	Jordan Richards	Oakland Raiders	October 2, 2019	1 year, $805,000
K	Mike Nugent	Oakland Raiders	October 3, 2019	1 year, $1.03 million
TE	Benjamin Watson	New England Patriots	October 14, 2019	1 year, $800,000
TE	Eric Tomlinson	New York Giants	October 15, 2019	1 year, $720,000
CB	Justin Bethel	Baltimore Ravens	October 22, 2019	1 year, $930,000
QB	Cody Kessler	New England Patriots	October 28, 2019	1 year, $720,000
K	Nick Folk	Arizona Hotshots (AAF)	October 29, 2019	1 year, $1.03 million
K	Kai Forbath	Jacksonville Jaguars	November 29, 2019	1 year, $930,000
DT	Albert Huggins	Philadelphia Eagles	December 2, 2019	1 year, $1.08 million
K	Nick Folk	New England Patriots	December 6, 2019	1 year, $1.03 million

Indicates that the player was a free agent at the end of his respective team's 2018 season.

=== Contract extensions ===
Position	Player	Date signed	Contract
WR	Julian Edelman	May 21, 2019	2 years, $18 million
QB	Tom Brady	August 4, 2019	2 years, $70 million
CB	Jonathan Jones	September 7, 2019	3 years, $21 million

=== Releases/waivers ===
Position	Player	2019 team	Date released
TE	Dwayne Allen	Miami Dolphins	March 4, 2019
WR	Darren Andrews	Calgary Stampeders (CFL)	March 4, 2019
DE	Adrian Clayborn	Atlanta Falcons	March 15, 2019
OT	Ryker Mathews	Hamilton Tiger-Cats (CFL)	May 2, 2019
WR	Bruce Ellington		May 8, 2019
OT	Calvin Anderson	New York Jets	May 13, 2019
WR	Xavier Ubosi	New York Jets	May 13, 2019
DT	Frank Herron	Tennessee Titans	May 16, 2019
C	Jake Eldrenkamp	Indianapolis Colts	May 20, 2019
TE	Austin Seferian-Jenkins		June 4, 2019
OT	Cole Croston	New England Patriots	July 30, 2019
CB	D'Angelo Ross	New England Patriots	August 12, 2019
QB/WR	Danny Etling	Atlanta Falcons	August 13, 2019
WR	Dontrelle Inman	Los Angeles Chargers	August 18, 2019
P	Ryan Allen	Atlanta Falcons	August 20, 2019
WR	Maurice Harris	New England Patriots	August 25, 2019
DE	Keionta Davis	New England Patriots	August 25, 2019
DT	Mike Pennel	Kansas City Chiefs	August 26, 2019
RB	Robert Martin		August 26, 2019
WR	Maurice Harris		August 27, 2019
TE	Andrew Beck	Denver Broncos	August 30, 2019
OT	Tyree St. Louis	New England Patriots	August 30, 2019
OT	Cedrick Lang		August 30, 2019
DT	David Parry		August 30, 2019
WR	Ryan Davis		August 30, 2019
FS	A. J. Howard	Baltimore Ravens	August 30, 2019
C	Tyler Gauthier	New England Patriots	August 30, 2019
WR	Damoun Patterson		August 30, 2019
MLB	Christian Sam	Miami Dolphins	August 30, 2019
OT	Martez Ivey		August 30, 2019
WR	Braxton Berrios	New York Jets	August 31, 2019
TE	Stephen Anderson	New England Patriots	August 31, 2019
DT	Ufomba Kamalu	New England Patriots	August 31, 2019
TE	Eric Saubert	Oakland Raiders	August 31, 2019
OLB	Calvin Munson	New England Patriots	August 31, 2019
OT	Dan Skipper	New England Patriots	August 31, 2019
DE	Nick Thurman	New England Patriots	August 31, 2019
MLB	Scooby Wright	New England Patriots	August 31, 2019
QB	Brian Hoyer	Indianapolis Colts	August 31, 2019
OLB	Terez Hall	New England Patriots	August 31, 2019
RB	Nick Brossette	Detroit Lions	August 31, 2019
WR	Demaryius Thomas	New England Patriots	August 31, 2019
OT	Cole Croston		August 31, 2019
FB	Jakob Johnson	New England Patriots	August 31, 2019
DE	Trent Harris	Miami Dolphins	August 31, 2019
CB	Ken Webster	Miami Dolphins	August 31, 2019
C	James Ferentz	New England Patriots	August 31, 2019
C	Russell Bodine		September 6, 2019
FS	Obi Melifonwu	New England Patriots	September 9, 2019
TE	Lance Kendricks	Los Angeles Chargers	September 9, 2019
WR	Antonio Brown		September 20, 2019
WR	Cameron Meredith		October 1, 2019
OT	Caleb Benenoch	Carolina Panthers	October 1, 2019
TE	Benjamin Watson	New England Patriots	October 7, 2019
QB	Cody Kessler	New England Patriots	October 15, 2019
SS	Jordan Richards	Baltimore Ravens	October 22, 2019
K	Mike Nugent		October 29, 2019
TE	Eric Tomlinson	Oakland Raiders	October 29, 2019
WR	Josh Gordon	Seattle Seahawks	October 31, 2019
K	Nick Folk	New England Patriots	November 29, 2019
K	Kai Forbath	Dallas Cowboys	December 4, 2019
DT	Albert Huggins	Philadelphia Eagles	December 7, 2019

Indicates that the player signed to a practice squad.

=== Retirements ===
Position	Player	Date retired
TE	Rob Gronkowski	March 24, 2019
OT	Jared Veldheer	May 21, 2019
C	Brian Schwenke	July 24, 2019
OG	J.J. Dielman	July 29, 2019

=== Trades ===
- March 14: the Patriots traded their 2020 fifth-round selection to the Philadelphia Eagles in exchange for defensive end Michael Bennett and a 2020 seventh-round pick.
- April 29: the Patriots traded tight end Jacob Hollister to the Seattle Seahawks in exchange for a 2020 seventh-round selection.
- August 12: the Patriots traded a conditional 2020 seventh-round pick to the Atlanta Falcons in exchange for tight end Eric Saubert.
- August 28: the Patriots traded a 2020 sixth round-selection to the Arizona Cardinals for offensive tackle Korey Cunningham.
- August 28: the Patriots traded a 2020 fourth-round pick to the Baltimore Ravens for a sixth-round pick and offensive guard Jermaine Eluemunor.
- August 30: the Patriots traded cornerback Duke Dawson and a 2020 seventh round draft pick to the Denver Broncos for a 2020 sixth round pick.
- August 30: the Patriots traded a sixth-round selection to the Buffalo Bills for center Russell Bodine.
- August 31: the Patriots traded cornerback Keion Crossen to the Houston Texans for a 2021 sixth-round selection.
- September 10: the Patriots traded wide receiver Demaryius Thomas to the New York Jets for a 2021 sixth-round selection.
- October 22: the Patriots traded a 2020 second-round pick to Atlanta for wide receiver Mohamed Sanu.
- October 24: the Patriots traded defensive end Michael Bennett to the Dallas Cowboys for a 2021 seventh-round selection that may turn into a sixth-round selection.

=== Draft ===
2019 New England Patriots Draft
Round	Selection	Player	Position	College	Notes
1	32	N'Keal Harry	WR	Arizona State	
2	45	Joejuan Williams	CB	Vanderbilt	from Atlanta via Los Angeles
3	77	Chase Winovich	DE	Michigan	from Carolina via Seattle
3	87	Damien Harris	RB	Alabama	from Chicago
3	101	Yodny Cajuste	OT	West Virginia	from New England via Los Angeles
4	118	Hjalte Froholdt	OG	Arkansas	from Washington via Green Bay and Seattle
4	133	Jarrett Stidham	QB	Auburn	from Los Angeles
5	159	Byron Cowart	DE	Maryland	from Seattle via Minnesota
5	163	Jake Bailey	P	Stanford	from Philadelphia
7	252	Ken Webster	CB	Mississippi	Compensatory pick

Notes

- As the result of the Patriots having more qualifying free agent depart during the 2018 free agency period than they signed, the team received four compensatory selections for the 2019 draft (No. 97 and 101 in the third round, No. 205 in the sixth round, and No. 252 in the seventh round).

2019 New England Patriots Draft Trades
Draft pick year	Round	Overall	Trading partner	Received
2018	2	51	Chicago Bears	Bears' second-round selection (No. 56 overall) and Bears' 2018 fourth-round selection (No. 105 overall)
2019	3	73	Chicago Bears	Bears' third-round selection (No. 87 overall), Bears' fifth-round selection (No. 162 overall), and Bears' 2020 fourth-round selection
2019	6	205	Chicago Bears	Bears' third-round selection (No. 87 overall), Bears' fifth-round selection (No. 162 overall), and Bears' 2020 fourth-round selection
2019	2	56	Los Angeles Rams	Rams' second-round selection (No. 45 overall)
2019	3	101	Los Angeles Rams	Rams' second-round selection (No. 45 overall)
2019	3	97	Los Angeles Rams	Rams' third-round selection (No. 101 overall) and Rams' fourth-round selection (No. 133 overall)
2019	5	162	Los Angeles Rams	Rams' third-round selection (No. 101 overall) and Rams' fourth-round selection (No. 133 overall)
2019	4	134	Los Angeles Rams	Rams' fifth-round selections (No. 162 overall and No. 167 overall)
2019	7	243	Los Angeles Rams	Rams' fifth-round selections (No. 162 overall and No. 167 overall)
2019	2	64	Seattle Seahawks	Seahawks' third-round selection (No. 77 overall) and fourth-round selection (No. 118 overall)
2019	3	95	Cleveland Browns	defensive tackle Danny Shelton and the Brown' 2018 fifth-round selection (No. 159 overall)
2019	5	170	Cleveland Browns	wide receiver Josh Gordon and Browns' seventh-round selection (No. 243 overall)
2018	4	114	Detroit Lions	Lions' third-round selection (No. 73 overall)
2019	6	204	Detroit Lions	cornerback Johnson Bademosi
2019	5	162	Minnesota Vikings	Vikings' fifth-round selection (No. 159 overall)
2019	7	239	Minnesota Vikings	Vikings' fifth-round selection (No. 159 overall)
2019	5	167	Philadelphia Eagles	Eagles' fifth-round selection (No. 163 overall)
2019	7	246	Philadelphia Eagles	Eagles' fifth-round selection (No. 163 overall)
2019	7	233	Philadelphia Eagles	Eagles' seventh-round selection (No. 239 overall) and 2018 seventh-round selection (No. 250 overall)

=== Undrafted free agents ===
Player	Position	College	Date signed
Calvin Anderson	OT	Texas	May 2, 2019
Andrew Beck	TE	Texas	May 2, 2019
Nick Brossette	RB	LSU	May 2, 2019
Ryan Davis	WR	Auburn	May 2, 2019
Malik Gant	SS	Marshall	May 2, 2019
Tyler Gauthier	C	Miami	May 2, 2019
Terez Hall	LB	Missouri	May 2, 2019
Jakobi Meyers	WR	NC State	May 2, 2019
D'Angelo Ross	CB	New Mexico	May 2, 2019
Tyree St. Louis	OT	Miami	May 2, 2019
Xavier Ubosi	WR	UAB	May 6, 2019
Gunner Olszewski	WR	Bemidji State	May 22, 2019
Martez Ivey	OT	Florida	July 30, 2019

Made regular season roster

=== Suspensions ===
- Tight end Benjamin Watson was suspended for four games at the start of the season for failing a drug test from March.
- Tight end Lance Kendricks was suspended for the season-opener by violating the league's policy on substances of abuse.

=== Injuries ===
- May 8: Wide receiver Bruce Ellington was released with an injury designation.
- July 25: Wide receiver Julian Edelman injured his thumb playing catch a few weeks prior. He would be set to miss "a few weeks" including possibly all of preseason. He returned on August 19, just before Week 3 of preseason.
- August 8: Wide receiver N'Keal Harry suffered an ankle injury during training camp and a "minor" hamstring injury while going up for a catch in the Patriots' first preseason game against the Detroit Lions. He was placed on injured reserve on September 2, 2019, after missing multiple weeks of practice.
- August 12: Cornerback D'Angelo Ross was waived with an injury designation. The following day, he was placed on the injury report after having cleared waivers.
- August 15: Wide receiver Maurice Harris sustained a leg injury in the Patriots' first joint practice with the Tennessee Titans. His recovery period was described as "a while". Although, while still limited by his injury, he returned on August 20 after missing only a few days. Ultimately, he was released with an injury designation on August 25. He was placed on the injury report the next day after clearing waivers.
- August 17: Defensive end Derek Rivers suffered a leg injury during the Patriots' Week 2 preseason game against the Tennessee Titans. He was placed on injured reserve week later.
- August 25: Defensive end Keionta Davis was placed on the injury report.
- August 25: Outside linebacker Brandon King suffered torn quadriceps in the Patriots' preseason game against the Carolina Panthers. He was placed on injured reserve days later.
- August 31: Center David Andrews was diagnosed with a blood clot in his lungs on August 26. He was placed on injured reserve days later.
- August 31: Wide receiver Cameron Meredith was kept on the physically unable to perform list, still dealing with issues with his knee from an ACL injury he suffered during the 2017 NFL season.
- August 31: Offensive guard Hjalte Froholdt was placed on injured reserve as a result of the neck injury he sustained during Week 4 of preseason against the New York Giants.
- August 31: Strong safety Malik Gant was placed on injured reserve.
- September 8: Offensive tackle Marcus Cannon suffered a shoulder injury against the Pittsburgh Steelers during the fourth quarter of the Week 1 matchup. The injury will be a setback for the Patriots' offensive line, although not season-ending for Cannon.
- September 15: Offensive tackle Isaiah Wynn sustained a toe injury in the Patriots' Week 2 game against the Miami Dolphins. He was placed on injured reserve on September 17, 2019.
- September 22: Julian Edelman suffered a rib injury in the Patriots' Week 3 game against the New York Jets.
- September 23: Fullback James Develin was placed on injured reserve due to a neck injury he suffered in Week 2 against the Miami Dolphins and is set to be out for at least 8 weeks.
- October 2: Kicker Stephen Gostkowski was placed on injured reserve as a result of a left hip injury.
- October 14: Fullback Jakob Johnson was placed on injured reserve due to a shoulder injury he suffered in Week 5 against the Washington Redskins.
- October 23: Wide receiver Josh Gordon was placed due to a knee injury he suffered in Week 6 against the New York Giants.
- November 19: Wide receiver Gunner Olszewski was placed on injured reserve with ankle and hamstring injuries.

== Staff ==
2019 New England Patriots staff
Front office: Chairman/CEO – Robert Kraft; President – Jonathan Kraft; General manager – Bill Belichick; Director of player personnel – Nick Caserio; Director of college scouting – Monti Ossenfort; Assistant director of college scouting – Brian Smith; Director of pro personnel – Dave Ziegler; Director of scouting administration – Nancy Meier; Football research director – Ernie Adams; Director of football/head coach administration – Berj Najarian; Head coaches: Head coach – Bill Belichick; Offensive coaches: Offensive coordinator/quarterbacks – Josh McDaniels; Assistant quarterbacks – Mick Lombardi; Running backs – Ivan Fears; Assistant running backs – Cole Popovich; Tight ends – Nick Caley; Offensive line – Dante Scarnecchia; Coaching assistant – Carmen Bricillo	Defensive coaches: Defensive Coordinator – Greg Schiano (resigned March 28); Defensive line – Bret Bielema; Inside linebackers – Jerod Mayo; Outside linebackers – DeMarcus Covington; Cornerbacks – Mike Pellegrino; Safeties – Steve Belichick; Coaching assistant – Brian Belichick; Coaching assistant – Bob Fraser; Special teams coaches: Special teams coordinator/wide receivers – Joe Judge; Assistant special teams – Cam Achord; Strength and conditioning: Head strength and conditioning – Moses Cabrera; Assistant strength and conditioning – Deron Mayo; Director of skill development – Joe Kim

== Rosters ==
=== Opening training camp ===
As of the Patriots' first training camp practice at Gillette Stadium on July 25, they had the NFL maximum of 90 players signed. As a result of the NFL's International Player Pathway program, the Patriots were granted an additional 91st spot which was allocated to German fullback Jakob Johnson.

New England Patriots 2019 opening training camp roster
Quarterbacks: 12 Tom Brady; 5 Danny Etling; 2 Brian Hoyer; 58 Jarrett Stidham; Running backs: 38 Brandon Bolden; 64 Nick Brossette; 34 Rex Burkhead; 46 James Develin FB; 53 Damien Harris; 47 Jakob Johnson FB; 26 Sony Michel; 28 James White; Wide receivers: 14 Braxton Berrios; 65 Ryan Davis; 13 Phillip Dorsett; 11 Julian Edelman; 82 Maurice Harris; 50 N'Keal Harry; 15 Dontrelle Inman; 69 Jakobi Meyers; 72 Gunner Olszewski; 17 Damoun Patterson; 18 Matthew Slater; 88 Demaryius Thomas; Tight ends: 80 Stephen Anderson; 63 Andrew Beck; 85 Ryan Izzo; 83 Matt LaCosse; 81 Lance Kendricks; 84 Benjamin Watson	Offensive linemen: 60 David Andrews C; 54 Yodny Cajuste T; 61 Marcus Cannon T; 74 Cole Croston T; 66 James Ferentz C; 55 Hjalte Froholdt G; 67 Tyler Gauthier C; 75 Ted Karras G; 77 Cedrick Lang T; 69 Shaq Mason G; 63 Brian Schwenke G; 72 Dan Skipper T; 71 Tyree St. Louis T; 62 Joe Thuney G; 76 Isaiah Wynn T; Defensive linemen: 77 Michael Bennett DE; 70 Adam Butler DT; 59 Byron Cowart DT; 58 Keionta Davis DE; 93 Lawrence Guy DT; 45 Trent Harris DE; 97 Ufomba Kamalu DT; 75 David Parry DT; 98 Mike Pennel DT; 95 Derek Rivers DE; 71 Danny Shelton DT; 86 Nick Thurman DE; 52 Chase Winovich DE; 91 Deatrich Wise Jr. DE	Linebackers: 51 Ja'Whaun Bentley MLB; 74 Shilique Calhoun OLB; 58 Jamie Collins OLB; 68 Terez Hall OLB; 54 Dont'a Hightower MLB; 36 Brandon King OLB; 48 Calvin Munson OLB; 52 Elandon Roberts MLB; 44 Christian Sam MLB; 55 John Simon OLB; 53 Kyle Van Noy OLB; Defensive backs: 25 Terrence Brooks FS; 23 Patrick Chung SS; 35 Keion Crossen CB; 29 Duke Dawson CB; 43 Nate Ebner FS; 24 Stephon Gilmore CB; 66 Malik Gant SS; 21 Duron Harmon SS; 39 A. J. Howard FS; 27 J. C. Jackson CB; 31 Jonathan Jones CB; 32 Devin McCourty FS; 30 Jason McCourty CB; 22 Obi Melifonwu FS; 70 D'Angelo Ross CB; 61 Ken Webster CB; 51 Joejuan Williams CB; Special teams: 6 Ryan Allen P; 7 Jake Bailey P; 49 Joe Cardona LS; 3 Stephen Gostkowski K	Reserve lists: 10 Josh Gordon WR (Susp.); Rookies in italics 91 active, 1 inactive

=== Week 1 ===
New England Patriots 2019 Week 1 roster
Quarterbacks: 12 Tom Brady; 4 Jarrett Stidham; Running backs: 38 Brandon Bolden; 34 Rex Burkhead; 46 James Develin FB; 37 Damien Harris; 26 Sony Michel KR; 28 James White; Wide receivers: 13 Phillip Dorsett; 11 Julian Edelman PR; 10 Josh Gordon; 16 Jakobi Meyers; 80 Gunner Olszewski PR; 18 Matthew Slater; 88 Demaryius Thomas; Tight ends: 85 Ryan Izzo; 83 Matt LaCosse	Offensive linemen: 61 Marcus Cannon T; 74 Korey Cunningham T; 65 Jermaine Eluemunor G; 66 James Ferentz C; 75 Ted Karras C; 69 Shaq Mason G; 62 Joe Thuney G; 76 Isaiah Wynn T; Defensive linemen: 77 Michael Bennett DE; 70 Adam Butler DT; 99 Byron Cowart DT; 93 Lawrence Guy DT; 71 Danny Shelton DT; 50 Chase Winovich DE; 91 Deatrich Wise Jr. DE	Linebackers: 51 Ja'Whaun Bentley MLB; 90 Shilique Calhoun OLB; 58 Jamie Collins OLB; 54 Dont'a Hightower MLB; 52 Elandon Roberts MLB; 55 John Simon OLB; 53 Kyle Van Noy OLB; Defensive backs: 25 Terrence Brooks FS; 23 Patrick Chung SS; 43 Nate Ebner FS; 24 Stephon Gilmore CB; 21 Duron Harmon SS; 27 J. C. Jackson CB; 31 Jonathan Jones CB; 32 Devin McCourty FS; 30 Jason McCourty CB; 22 Obi Melifonwu FS; 33 Joejuan Williams CB; Special teams: 7 Jake Bailey P; 49 Joe Cardona LS; 3 Stephen Gostkowski K	Reserve lists: 60 David Andrews C (IR); 64 Yodny Cajuste T (NF-Inj.); 63 Keionta Davis DE (IR); 58 Hjalte Froholdt G (IR); 42 Malik Gant SS (IR); 15 N'Keal Harry WR (IR); 81 Lance Kendricks TE (Susp.); 36 Brandon King OLB (IR); 19 Cameron Meredith WR (PUP); 95 Derek Rivers DE (IR); 41 D'Angelo Ross CB (IR); 84 Benjamin Watson TE (Susp.); Practice squad: 82 Stephen Anderson TE; 67 Colby Gossett G; 96 Gerri Green DE; 59 Terez Hall OLB; 47 Jakob Johnson FB; 94 Ufomba Kamalu DT; 48 Calvin Munson OLB; 72 Dan Skipper T; 92 Nick Thurman DT; 68 Najee Toran G; Rookies in italics 53 active, 12 inactive, 10 practice squad

=== Final ===
2019 New England Patriots roster
Quarterbacks (QB): 12 Tom Brady; 6 Cody Kessler; 4 Jarrett Stidham; Running backs (RB): 38 Brandon Bolden; 34 Rex Burkhead; 37 Damien Harris; 26 Sony Michel; 28 James White; Wide receivers (WR): 13 Phillip Dorsett; 11 Julian Edelman; 15 N'Keal Harry; 16 Jakobi Meyers; 14 Mohamed Sanu; 18 Matthew Slater; Tight ends (TE): 85 Ryan Izzo; 83 Matt LaCosse; 84 Ben Watson	Offensive linemen (OL): 61 Marcus Cannon T; 74 Korey Cunningham T; 65 Jermaine Eluemunor G; 66 James Ferentz C/G; 75 Ted Karras C; 69 Shaq Mason G; 72 Marshall Newhouse T; 62 Joe Thuney G; 76 Isaiah Wynn T; Defensive linemen (DL): 70 Adam Butler DT; 90 Shilique Calhoun DE; 99 Byron Cowart DT; 93 Lawrence Guy DT; 71 Danny Shelton DT; 55 John Simon DE; 50 Chase Winovich DE; 91 Deatrich Wise DE	Linebackers (LB): 51 Ja'Whaun Bentley OLB; 58 Jamie Collins OLB; 54 Dont'a Hightower MLB; 52 Elandon Roberts MLB; 53 Kyle Van Noy OLB; Defensive backs (DB): 29 Justin Bethel CB; 25 Terrence Brooks FS; 23 Patrick Chung SS; 43 Nate Ebner FS; 24 Stephon Gilmore CB; 21 Duron Harmon SS; 27 J. C. Jackson CB; 31 Jonathan Jones; 32 Devin McCourty FS; 30 Jason McCourty CB; 33 Joejuan Williams CB; Special teams (ST): 7 Jake Bailey P; 49 Joe Cardona LS; 2 Nick Folk K	Practice squad: 10 Quincy Adeboyejo WR; 96 Tashawn Bower DE; 59 Terez Hall OLB; 45 Eric Lee DE; 22 Obi Melifonwu FS (IR); 35 Adarius Pickett SS; 17 Devin Ross WR; 92 Nick Thurman DT; 68 Najee Toran G; Reserve: 60 David Andrews C (IR); 63 Yodny Cajuste T (NF-Inj.); 58 Keionta Davis DE (IR); 46 James Develin FB (IR); 64 Hjalte Froholdt G (IR); 42 Malik Gant SS (IR); 3 Stephen Gostkowski K (IR); 47 Jakob Johnson FB (IR); 36 Brandon King OLB (IR); 80 Gunner Olszewski WR (IR); 95 Derek Rivers DE (IR); 41 D'Angelo Ross CB (IR); Rookies in italics 53 active, 13 reserve, 8 practice squad

== Preseason ==
Week	Date	Opponent	Result	Record	Game site	NFL.com recap
1	August 8	at Detroit Lions	W 31–3	1–0	Ford Field	Recap
2	August 17	at Tennessee Titans	W 22–17	2–0	Nissan Stadium	Recap
3	August 22	Carolina Panthers	W 10–3	3–0	Gillette Stadium	Recap
4	August 29	New York Giants	L 29–31	3–1	Gillette Stadium	Recap

== Regular season ==
=== Schedule ===
Week	Date	Opponent	Result	Record	Venue	NFL.com recap
1	September 8	Pittsburgh Steelers	**W** 33–3	1–0	Gillette Stadium	Recap
2	September 15	at **Miami Dolphins**	**W** 43–0	2–0	Hard Rock Stadium	Recap
3	September 22	**New York Jets**	**W** 30–14	3–0	Gillette Stadium	Recap
4	September 29	at **Buffalo Bills**	**W** 16–10	4–0	New Era Field	Recap
5	October 6	at Washington Redskins	**W** 33–7	5–0	FedEx Field	Recap
6	October 10	New York Giants	**W** 35–14	6–0	Gillette Stadium	Recap
7	October 21	at **New York Jets**	**W** 33–0	7–0	MetLife Stadium	Recap
8	October 27	Cleveland Browns	**W** 27–13	8–0	Gillette Stadium	Recap
9	November 3	at Baltimore Ravens	**L** 20–37	8–1	M&T Bank Stadium	Recap
10	Bye					
11	November 17	at Philadelphia Eagles	**W** 17–10	9–1	Lincoln Financial Field	Recap
12	November 24	Dallas Cowboys	**W** 13–9	10–1	Gillette Stadium	Recap
13	December 1	at Houston Texans	**L** 22–28	10–2	NRG Stadium	Recap
14	December 8	Kansas City Chiefs	**L** 16–23	10–3	Gillette Stadium	Recap
15	December 15	at Cincinnati Bengals	**W** 34–13	11–3	Paul Brown Stadium	Recap
16	December 21	**Buffalo Bills**	**W** 24–17	12–3	Gillette Stadium	Recap
17	December 29	**Miami Dolphins**	**L** 24–27	12–4	Gillette Stadium	Recap

Note: Intra-division opponents are in bold text.

=== Game summaries ===
==== Week 1: vs. Pittsburgh Steelers ====
Week One: Pittsburgh Steelers at New England Patriots – Game summary

Quarter	1	2	3	4	Total
Steelers	0	0	3	0	**3**
**Patriots**	7	13	10	3	**33**

at Gillette Stadium, Foxborough, Massachusetts

- Date: September 8
- Game time: 8:20 p.m. EDT
- Game weather: Partly cloudy and mild, 66 °F (19 °C)
- Game attendance: 65,878
- Referee: Clete Blakeman
- TV announcers (NBC): Al Michaels, Cris Collinsworth, Michele Tafoya and Terry McAulay
- Recap, Game Book

Game information

**First quarter**

- NE – Josh Gordon 20-yard pass from Tom Brady (Stephen Gostkowski kick), 4:46. Patriots 7–0. **Drive: 7 plays, 82 yards, 3:08.**

**Second quarter**

- NE – Stephen Gostkowski 25-yard field goal, 11:52. Patriots 10–0. **Drive: 12 plays, 55 yards, 5:24.**
- NE – Phillip Dorsett 25-yard pass from Tom Brady (Stephen Gostkowski kick), 3:49. Patriots 17–0. **Drive: 6 plays, 80 yards, 3:09.**
- NE – Stephen Gostkowski 41-yard field goal, 0:17. Patriots 20–0. **Drive: 8 plays, 30 yards, 1:40.**

**Third quarter**

- PIT – Chris Boswell 19-yard field goal, 10:17. Patriots 20–3. **Drive: 11 plays, 74 yards, 4:43.**
- NE – Phillip Dorsett 58-yard pass from Tom Brady (Stephen Gostkowski kick), 8:05. Patriots 27–3. **Drive: 4 plays, 75 yards, 2:12.**
- NE – Stephen Gostkowski 35-yard field goal, 0:13. Patriots 30–3. **Drive: 9 plays, 73 yards, 5:07.**

**Fourth quarter**

- NE – Stephen Gostkowski 39-yard field goal, 6:38. Patriots 33–3. **Drive: 13 plays, 34 yards, 5:48.**

**Top passers**

- PIT – Ben Roethlisberger – 27/47, 276 yards, INT
- NE – Tom Brady – 24/36, 341 yards, 3 TD

**Top rushers**

- PIT – James Conner – 10 rushes, 21 yards
- NE – Rex Burkhead – 8 rushes, 44 yards

**Top receivers**

- PIT – JuJu Smith-Schuster – 6 receptions, 78 yards
- NE – Phillip Dorsett – 4 receptions, 95 yards, 2 TD

The Patriots hosted the Pittsburgh Steelers during primetime in their first game of the 2019 season. In commemoration of their Super Bowl LIII victory from the previous season, the Patriots unveiled their sixth "World Champions" banner, with former Patriots in attendance like recently retired Rob Gronkowski, as well as Patriots Hall of Famers Drew Bledsoe, Ty Law, Willie McGinest, Super Bowl Champions Rob Ninkovich, and Martellus Bennett, who joined Patriots owner Robert Kraft on the field before the Patriots came out onto the Gillette Stadium turf. The team also wore "Super Bowl LIII Champions" patches for the game. The Sunday night appearance broke the tradition of the reigning Super Bowl champions hosting the NFL Kickoff Game, which was instead given to the Green Bay Packers and Chicago Bears to commemorate the NFL's oldest rivalry for its 100th anniversary.

The Steelers won the coin toss and elected to kick. The first drives ended in punts for both teams, but on the Patriots' second possession, they managed to race down the field on a seven-play, 82-yard drive that ended with a touchdown pass to Josh Gordon, in which he broke two tackles after the catch. After forcing the Steelers to go three-and-out, due in part to a holding call on Alejandro Villanueva, the Patriots marched down the field, only for the drive to stall at the Pittsburgh 7-yard line, and the Patriots were forced to settle for a field goal, now leading 10–0 in the second quarter. New England went three-and-out on their following drive but scored on a 25-yard pass to Phillip Dorsett thereafter. In the Patriots' last possession of the first half, even with good field position, they failed to capitalize with a touchdown, settling for another field goal. Beginning the second half, the Patriots led 20–0. This lasted only briefly, as their defense gave up three points on the Steelers' first drive of the third quarter. Tom Brady and the offense responded quickly with a 58-yard pass to Dorsett, his second touchdown catch of the game. On their subsequent possessions, the Patriots scored field goals. Meanwhile, Ben Roethlisberger was intercepted by Devin McCourty. In Pittsburgh's final drive, they managed to advance 50 yards down the field, but failed to score with time running out. Ultimately, the Patriots defeated the Steelers 33–3, starting 1–0 for the season.

Beginning his 20th season in the league, Tom Brady finished the game with 341 yards and three touchdowns, while Julian Edelman recorded his 500th reception with the Patriots, becoming the fifth player to reach that milestone. Phillip Dorsett had a spectacular game, leading the Patriots in receiving yards and touchdowns, catching four passes on four targets for 95 yards and two touchdowns. Meanwhile, Josh Gordon had three receptions for 73 yards in his first game since Week 13 of the 2018 season. Moreover, the Patriots defense played well, holding the Steelers to 308 yards and just three points.

==== Week 2: at Miami Dolphins ====
Week Two: New England Patriots at Miami Dolphins – Game summary

Quarter	1	2	3	4	Total
**Patriots**	7	6	10	20	**43**
Dolphins	0	0	0	0	**0**

at Hard Rock Stadium, Miami Gardens, Florida

- Date: September 15
- Game time: 1:00 p.m. EDT
- Game weather: Mostly cloudy, 87 °F (31 °C)
- Game attendance: 65,513
- Referee: Bill Vinovich
- TV announcers (CBS): Ian Eagle, Dan Fouts and Evan Washburn
- Recap, Game Book

Game information

**First quarter**

- NE – Sony Michel 1-yard run (Stephen Gostkowski kick), 7:46. Patriots 7–0. **Drive: 10 plays, 60 yards, 5:52.**

**Second quarter**

- NE – Antonio Brown 20-yard pass from Tom Brady (kick failed, wide left), 1:19. Patriots 13–0. **Drive: 11 plays, 65 yards, 6:11.**

**Third quarter**

- NE – Stephen Gostkowski 28-yard field goal, 8:45. Patriots 16–0. **Drive: 10 plays, 26 yards, 3:41.**
- NE – Tom Brady 1-yard run (Stephen Gostkowski kick), 2:18. Patriots 23–0. **Drive: 8 plays, 65 yards, 5:08.**

**Fourth quarter**

- NE – Stephon Gilmore 54-yard interception return (Stephen Gostkowski kick), 10:45. Patriots 30–0.
- NE – Jamie Collins 69-yard interception return (Stephen Gostkowski kick), 8:57. Patriots 37–0.
- NE – James White 10-yard pass from Tom Brady (kick failed, wide right), 2:10. Patriots 43–0. **Drive: 5 plays, 59 yards, 2:59.**

**Top passers**

- NE – Tom Brady – 20/28, 264 yards, 2 TD
- MIA – Josh Rosen – 7/18, 97 yards, INT

**Top rushers**

- NE – Sony Michel – 21 rushes, 85 yards, TD
- MIA – Kenyan Drake – 6 rushes, 19 yards

**Top receivers**

- NE – Antonio Brown – 4 receptions, 56 yards, TD
- MIA – Preston Williams – 4 receptions, 63 yards

Coming off their Week 1 victory, the Patriots flew to Hard Rock Stadium for a Week 2 AFC East duel with the Miami Dolphins. After forcing the Dolphins to go three-and-out, the Patriots countered with a drive in which Tom Brady targeted newly acquired wide receiver Antonio Brown three times for gains of 18, 10, and 8 yards. They finished the possession with a 1-yard touchdown run by Sony Michel. The next three drives ended in punts. Though, on the first, Ryan Fitzpatrick was sacked by Adam Butler on third down just after reaching midfield. On the Patriots' ensuing possession, they drove to the Dolphins 30 but Stephen Gostkowski missed the first of a number of field goals that day. Despite the offense's lack of scoring, the New England defense played stoutly, forcing Miami to go three-and-out on their next two drives. The Patriots scored on a 65-yard possession that ended with a 20-yard pass from Tom Brady to Antonio Brown. Gostkowski missed the extra point and the Patriots led 13–0. In the second half, the New England offense failed to advance on their first drive. Meanwhile, Ryan Fitzpatrick was intercepted by Devin McCourty. Now, with great field position, at the Miami 36, the Patriots failed to take advantage and were forced to settle for a field goal. The Dolphins' offense was unable to make anything of their next two drives going three-and-out on both while obtaining −2 yards and −11 yards on their first and second respectively. The Patriots offense made the best of their defense's solid play, marching down the field on an eight-play, 65-yard possession which ended with a 1-yard QB sneak by Brady. Later, New England's defense continued its sensational performance by forcing Miami to go three-and-out yet again. Upon entering the third quarter, Miami's offense had amassed a mere 28 yards. The Patriots' offense struggled, however, being unable to obtain a first-down. This proved irrelevant as the New England defense had pick-sixes on back-to-back drives: Stephon Gilmore returned the first 54-yards after a bad decision by Fitzpatrick and Jamie Collins returned the second 69-yards after a dropped pass. The Patriots now led 37–0. Ryan Fitzpatrick was replaced by backup Josh Rosen on the ensuing drive. The Patriots scored another touchdown on a 10-yard reception by James White. On Miami's final possession, they marched 67-yards to the New England 8 but failed to score due to an interception by Jamie Collins.

This was the Patriots' first win in Miami since Week 17 of the 2016 season, and their first shutout since Week 3 of that same season. Additionally, New England's defense held the Dolphins' offense to just 184 yards and forced four turnovers. By holding the Dolphins to 0 points and the Steelers to 3 points a week prior, the defense made history, in fact, it tied the record for fewest points allowed through two games during the Super Bowl era. After much speculation over whether Antonio Brown would debut against the Dolphins as a result of his rape lawsuit, he indeed started and had four receptions for 56 yards and a touchdown. This proved to be to Brown's sole game with the Patriots as he was released days later on September 20, as a result of his response to further allegations. This was New England's last win in Miami until 2025.

==== Week 3: vs. New York Jets ====
Week Three: New York Jets at New England Patriots – Game summary

Quarter	1	2	3	4	Total
Jets	0	0	7	7	**14**
**Patriots**	13	7	10	0	**30**

at Gillette Stadium, Foxborough, Massachusetts

- Date: September 22
- Game time: 1:00 p.m. EDT
- Game weather: Sunny and warm, 81 °F (27 °C)
- Game attendance: 65,878
- Referee: Carl Cheffers
- TV announcers (CBS): Kevin Harlan, Rich Gannon and Dana Jacobson
- Recap, Game Book

Game information

**First quarter**

- NE – Sony Michel 5-yard run (kick failed, wide right), 7:55. Patriots 6–0. **Drive: 9 plays, 88 yards, 4:31.**
- NE – Phillip Dorsett 25-yard pass from Tom Brady (Stephen Gostkowski kick), 4:25. Patriots 13–0. **Drive: 3 plays, 45 yards, 1:22.**

**Second quarter**

- NE – Julian Edelman 3-yard pass from Tom Brady (Stephen Gostkowski kick), 13:34. Patriots 20–0. **Drive: 10 plays, 59 yards, 4:24.**

**Third quarter**

- NE – Stephen Gostkowski 37-yard field goal, 8:49. Patriots 23–0. **Drive: 5 plays, −2 yards, 2:47.**
- NE – Rex Burkhead 2-yard run (Stephen Gostkowski kick), 3:07. Patriots 30–0. **Drive: 10 plays, 60 yards, 4:40.**
- NYJ – Arthur Maulet fumble recovery in the end zone (Sam Ficken kick), 0:21. Patriots 30–7.

**Fourth quarter**

- NYJ – Jamal Adams 61-yard interception return (Sam Ficken kick), 6:23. Patriots 30–14.

**Top passers**

- NYJ – Luke Falk – 12/22, 98 yards, INT
- NE – Tom Brady – 28/42, 306 yards, 2 TD

**Top rushers**

- NYJ – Le'Veon Bell – 18 rushes, 35 yards
- NE – Rex Burkhead – 11 rushes, 47 yards, TD

**Top receivers**

- NYJ – Braxton Berrios – 2 receptions, 29 yards
- NE – Josh Gordon – 6 receptions, 83 yards

The Patriots flew home to face the New York Jets for their Week 3 matchup. They faced a Jets team that was greatly hindered by numerous starters missing. In particular, the Jets entered the game with their third-string quarterback, Luke Falk, as a result of injuries to starter Sam Darnold suffering from illness and backup Trevor Siemian sustaining a calf injury.

New York's first drive ended with a punt and the Patriots responded with a nine-play, 88-yard drive that ended with a 5-yard run by Sony Michel. Continuing his struggles on special teams, Stephen Gostkowski missed his third extra-point of the year. On the Jets' ensuing drive, they went three-and-out as a result of a sack by Jamie Collins. Meanwhile, New Englands' offense would score yet another touchdown, this time on a 25-yard catch-and-run by Phillip Dorsett. New York's offense failed to obtain any first-downs for the rest of the first half, and the Patriots would score an additional touchdown on a 3-yard pass from Tom Brady to Julian Edelman. Although, the rest of their drives ended in punts. Entering the second half, New England led 20–0. The Patriots started with the ball but were unable to reach midfield and were forced to punt. On the following drive, Luke Falk threw an underthrown interception to Devin McCourty which was returned 24-yards to the New York 17. Unfortunately, the Patriots were unable to take advantage and settled for a 37-yard field goal. The defense would still play stoutly, forcing the Jets to go three-and-out on their ensuing drive, caused, in part, by a holding penalty on Kelechi Osemele. The Patriots countered with a 10-play, 60-yard drive which ended with a 2-yard rush touchdown by Rex Burkhead, leading 30–0. Notably, Josh Gordon caught a spectacular 28-yard reception on third and 22, saving the drive from stalling and entering the red zone. On New York's next drive, they managed the reach near midfield but the drive was halted by a sack by Dont'a Hightower and Adam Butler. The punt would prove disastrous for New England as rookie Gunner Olszewski muffed the ball and Arthur Maulet, of the Jets, recovered it in the end zone for a touchdown: this was the first touchdown the Patriots had allowed all season. The ensuing two drives ended in punts. Although, on the Patriots' subsequent possession thereafter, Tom Brady was substituted by rookie Jarrett Stidham with 8:41 left in the fourth. Stidham threw a badly missed pass which was intercepted by Jamal Adams and returned 61 yards for a touchdown. For the remaining drives, both teams punted and New England won the game 30–14.

With the win, the Patriots improved to 3–0 for the first time since the 2016 season. Furthermore, New England's defense continued its dominant play by shutting out the Jets' offense and sacking Luke Falk five times. Overall, they forced New York to go 0–12 on third downs. The Patriots' defense has not allowed a touchdown in 17 quarters, last occurring in the fourth quarter of the 2018 AFC Championship game. Also, this was the fifth consecutive game, including playoffs, in which the Patriots did not allow any touchdowns in the first half, tracing back to the 2018 AFC Championship.

==== Week 4: at Buffalo Bills ====
Week Four: New England Patriots at Buffalo Bills – Game summary

Quarter	1	2	3	4	Total
**Patriots**	13	0	3	0	**16**
Bills	0	3	7	0	**10**

at New Era Field, Orchard Park, New York

- Date: September 29
- Game time: 1:00 p.m. EDT
- Game weather: Mostly cloudy, 58 °F (14 °C)
- Game attendance: 70,317
- Referee: Craig Wrolstad
- TV announcers (CBS): Ian Eagle, Dan Fouts and Evan Washburn
- Recap, Game Book

Game information

**First quarter**

- NE – Brandon Bolden 4-yard run (kick failed, wide right), 7:35. Patriots 6–0. **Drive: 7 plays, 50 yards, 2:57.**
- NE – Matthew Slater 11-yard return of blocked punt (Stephen Gostkowski kick), 6:22. Patriots 13–0.

**Second quarter**

- BUF – Stephen Hauschka 46-yard field goal, 1:55. Patriots 13–3. **Drive: 6 plays, 52 yards, 2:13.**

**Third quarter**

- BUF – Josh Allen 1-yard run (Stephen Hauschka kick), 10:37. Patriots 13–10. **Drive: 9 plays, 75 yards, 4:23.**
- NE – Stephen Gostkowski 23-yard field goal, 0:58. Patriots 16–10. **Drive: 7 plays, 38 yards, 2:59.**

**Fourth quarter**

- No scoring plays.

**Top passers**

- NE – Tom Brady – 18/39, 150 yards, INT
- BUF – Josh Allen – 13/28, 153 yards, 3 INT

**Top rushers**

- NE – Sony Michel – 17 rushes, 63 yards
- BUF – Frank Gore – 17 rushes, 109 yards

**Top receivers**

- NE – James White – 8 receptions, 57 yards
- BUF – Cole Beasley – 7 receptions, 75 yards

Hoping to solidify their prowess in the AFC East, the Patriots flew to New Era Field for their Week 4 matchup against a division rival – the 3–0 Buffalo Bills. The Patriots began with the ball and started well with a 15-yard rush by Sony Michel on the first play. Though the drive faltered thereafter and they were forced to punt. In contrast, the defense maintained its tremendous play by intercepting Josh Allen on the Bills' first drive; Devin McCourty claimed his fourth pick of the season. Taking advantage of the turnover, New England's offense marched 50 yards down the field for a 4-yard touchdown run by Brandon Bolden. Tom Brady also threw a catch-and-run pass to James White for 26 yards despite great coverage by Matt Milano. On the extra point attempt, Stephen Gostkowski missed yet another extra point, his fourth of the season. On the ensuing possession, the Bills struggled to obtain yards and went three-and-out. On the resulting punt, J. C. Jackson blocked Corey Bojorquez's kick which was recovered and returned by Matthew Slater for a touchdown to put the Patriots up 13–0. Both teams' offenses failed to reach midfield and punted on the next two drives. However, on the possession after that, Josh Allen threw another pick, which was intercepted by J. C. Jackson. Without much momentum and at their own 25, New England went three-and-out, although Buffalo went three-and-out as well. Now at their own 5-yard line, the Patriots offense finally managed an effective drive for once. They drove 93 yards to the Buffalo 2-yard line, but the drive stalled and Brady threw a terrible pick to Micah Hyde in the endzone. Buffalo capitalized with a 46-yard field goal by Stephen Hauschka. Unable to counter, New England went three-and-out once more and the Bills drove to the New England 31 but failed to score as Hauschka missed a 49-yard field goal with time running out in the first half. Entering the second half, the Patriots led 13–3. The Bills' first drive was very effective as they marched 75 yards down the field and scored on a 1-yard QB sneak by Allen. This was the first touchdown allowed by the Patriots' defense all season. On the subsequent three possessions, both offenses only experienced only three-and-outs. Afterward, J. C. Jackson intercepted Josh Allen for his second pick of the day. Even with great field position at the Buffalo 42, the Patriots only managed to reach the Buffalo 4-yard line where they settled for a field goal. Josh Allen was concussed from a hit by Jonathan Jones on the ensuing drive while he attempted to scramble for a first down. Allen would be replaced by backup Matt Barkley who continued to lead the offense to the New England 3-yard line where the Bills failed to score on 4th-and-goal. Both teams' offenses were unable to create any effective drives after this point. Nonetheless, Buffalo's offense managed to reach midfield on their final possession but Matt Barkley threw an easy interception to Jamie Collins as a result of pressure from Kyle Van Noy. This pick clinched the game for New England and they won 16–10.

Although the Patriots overcame the Bills, this proved to be an extremely sloppy game for their offense, as Tom Brady recorded his first interception of the year at the Buffalo 2-yard line and a completion rate under 50%, having gone 18 of 39. New England's offense went a mere 5/18 on third down conversions and only obtained 11 first-downs. The defense, however, recorded four interceptions (three on Josh Allen and one on Matt Barkley) as well as five sacks but also allowed 109 yards of rushing from Frank Gore and 23 first-downs. In the end, the defense still came through by making a critical stop on the Bills' final possession. Regardless, with the victory, the Patriots improved to 4–0 for the first time since the 2015 season. Special teams ace Matthew Slater also scored his first career touchdown on an 11-yard blocked punt return. Furthermore, with his interception off Josh Allen, Devin McCourty became the first player to record four interceptions in the first four games of a season since Minnesota Vikings safety Brian Russell in 2003.

==== Week 5: at Washington Redskins ====
Week Five: New England Patriots at Washington Redskins – Game summary

Quarter	1	2	3	4	Total
**Patriots**	6	6	14	7	**33**
Redskins	7	0	0	0	**7**

at FedEx Field, Landover, Maryland

- Date: October 6
- Game time: 1:00 p.m. EDT
- Game weather: Cloudy, 70 °F (21 °C)
- Game attendance: 76,483
- Referee: Clay Martin
- TV announcers (CBS): Greg Gumbel, Trent Green and Melanie Collins
- Recap, Game Book

Game information

**First quarter**

- WAS – Steven Sims 65-yard run (Dustin Hopkins kick), 9:26. Redskins 7–0. **Drive: 2 plays, 67 yards, 0:52.**
- NE – Julian Edelman 6-yard pass from Tom Brady (kick failed, wide right), 7:09. Redskins 7–6. **Drive: 6 plays, 75 yards, 2:17.**

**Second quarter**

- NE – Mike Nugent 37-yard field goal, 10:35. Patriots 9–7. **Drive: 8 plays, 61 yards, 2:55.**
- NE – Mike Nugent 23-yard field goal, 0:30. Patriots 12–7. **Drive: 4 plays, 6 yards, 0:21.**

**Third quarter**

- NE – Brandon Bolden 29-yard pass from Tom Brady (Mike Nugent kick), 10:57. Patriots 19–7. **Drive: 7 plays, 75 yards, 4:03.**
- NE – Sony Michel 14-yard run (Mike Nugent kick), 4:35. Patriots 26–7. **Drive: 6 plays, 88 yards, 3:05.**

**Fourth quarter**

- NE – Ryan Izzo 10-yard pass from Tom Brady (Mike Nugent kick), 9:14. Patriots 33–7. **Drive: 10 plays, 58 yards, 4:08.**

**Top passers**

- NE – Tom Brady – 28/42, 348 yards, 3 TD, INT
- WAS – Colt McCoy – 18/27, 122 yards, INT

**Top rushers**

- NE – Sony Michel – 16 rushes, 91 yards, TD
- WAS – Steven Sims – 1 rush, 65 yards, TD

**Top receivers**

- NE – Julian Edelman – 8 receptions, 110 yards, TD
- WAS – Terry McLaurin – 3 receptions, 51 yards

On the road for the second straight week, the Patriots flew to FedExField to face the 0–4 Washington Redskins. Initially, both teams traded punts, but on the succeeding possession, Patriots' defenders missed numerous tackles and Washington scored on a 65-yard run by Steven Sims. This was the first time the Patriots had trailed all season. However, New England responded quickly with a no-huddle offense and marched 75 yards, scoring on a 6-yard catch by Julian Edelman. On the extra-point, newly signed kicker Mike Nugent missed the kick, his first as a Patriot. Washington's next drive was halted by a sack from Danny Shelton. Neither team could reach midfield on any of the remaining possessions of the first quarter. With the Patriots' first drive in the second, they raced down the field to the Washington 19, but were stalled and forced to settle for a 37-yard field goal. Both teams went three-and-out on their next drives. Although, on the possession thereafter, Jonathan Jones forced a fumble on Trey Quinn and Jamie Collins recovered. New England's offense failed to score despite being in the redzone, as Tom Brady threw an awful interception to Montae Nicholson. Even with this turnover, the Redskins offense lacked momentum and failed to advance. On the next Washington possession, Colt McCoy was picked by Jason McCourty. At the Washington 11-yard line, the Patriots went three-and-out and settled for a field goal with the score being 12–7 at the end of the first half. With the passing game being mostly unreliable, New England's offense began relying on and utilizing its running game far more. This proved vital as the Patriots advanced rapidly behind Sony Michel's rushing attack and they scored on a 29-yard pass to Brandon Bolden. On the ensuing New England drive, they would score on a 14-yard run by Michel. Both teams exchanged punts for the rest of the game and the Patriots would score an additional touchdown on a 10-yard pass to Ryan Izzo in a 10-play, 58-yard possession. At the end of regulation, New England defeated the Redksins in a final score of 33–7.

The Patriots continued their win streak on the road by beating the Washington Redskins in a blowout win. They improved to 5–0 for the fourth time under the Brady-Belichick tandem and the fifth time in franchise history. After the game, Julian Edelman became the first Patriot to record at least 100 yards this season. In addition, during the matchup, Tom Brady surpassed Brett Favre for third on the all-time passing list and finished only 17 yards behind Peyton Manning. Sony Michel had his break-out game, rushing for 91 yards and a touchdown on 16 attempts; he also caught three passes for 32 yards. This was due, in part, to great run blocking by the offensive line and fullback Jakob Johnson. On defense, they continued their stout play by forcing two turnovers (one on a fumble and one on an interception) and six sacks. Disregarding the 65-yard run by Steven Sims, New England's defense allowed just 155 yards. The Patriots defense also accomplished a historic feat by allowing only 20 points through five games, the fewest in modern NFL history.

==== Week 6: vs. New York Giants ====
Week Six: New York Giants at New England Patriots – Game summary

Quarter	1	2	3	4	Total
Giants	0	14	0	0	**14**
**Patriots**	7	14	0	14	**35**

at Gillette Stadium, Foxborough, Massachusetts

- Date: October 10
- Game time: 8:20 p.m. EDT
- Game weather: Mostly cloudy, 54 °F (12 °C)
- Game attendance: 65,878
- Referee: Brad Allen
- TV announcers (Fox/NFLN/Amazon Prime): Joe Buck, Troy Aikman, Erin Andrews and Kristina Pink
- Recap, Game Book

Game information

**First quarter**

- NE – Chase Winovich 6-yard return of blocked punt (Mike Nugent kick), 1:41. Patriots 7–0.

**Second quarter**

- NE – Brandon Bolden 1-yard run (Mike Nugent kick), 7:11. Patriots 14–0. **Drive: 5 plays, 20 yards, 2:15.**
- NYG – Golden Tate 64-yard pass from Daniel Jones (Aldrick Rosas kick), 6:05. Patriots 14–7. **Drive: 3 plays, 75 yards, 1:06.**
- NYG – Markus Golden 42-yard fumble return (Aldrick Rosas kick), 4:38. Tied 14–14.
- NE – Tom Brady 1-yard run (Mike Nugent kick), 0:36. Patriots 21–14. **Drive: 11 plays, 75 yards, 4:02.**

**Third quarter**

- No scoring plays.

**Fourth quarter**

- NE – Kyle Van Noy 22-yard fumble return (Mike Nugent kick), 8:33. Patriots 28–14.
- NE – Tom Brady 1-yard run (Mike Nugent kick), 3:49. Patriots 35–14. **Drive: 7 plays, 63 yards, 3:09.**

**Top passers**

- NYG – Daniel Jones – 15/31, 161 yards, TD, 3 INT
- NE – Tom Brady – 31/41, 334 yards, INT

**Top rushers**

- NYG – Jon Hilliman – 11 rushes, 38 yards
- NE – Sony Michel – 22 rushes, 86 yards

**Top receivers**

- NYG – Golden Tate – 6 receptions, 102 yards, TD
- NE – Julian Edelman – 9 receptions, 113 yards

The Patriots returned home to play the New York Giants, who were led by rookie quarterback Daniel Jones. Both teams traded punts on the first three possessions. Though, on the Giants' second drive, Jones threw a pass that was tipped by Stephon Gilmore and intercepted by John Simon. Now at the New York 43, due to miscommunication, Tom Brady threw a pass intended for Julian Edelman, but was picked by Janoris Jenkins. With neither offense being able to advance past midfield, they punted for the next six possessions. However, during one of these drives, Brandon Bolden blocked a punt by Riley Dixon that was returned by Chase Winovich for a touchdown. With this, the Patriots led 7–0. A few possessions later, Daniel Jones was picked off again, this time by Duron Harmon. With great field position at the Giants 20, Jakobi Meyers caught a great 23-yard pass that set up a 1-yard touchdown run by Brandon Bolden. New York responded quickly by scoring on a 64-yard catch-and-run by Golden Tate in which the numerous Patriots missed tackles. On the ensuing drive, Brady was strip-sacked by Lorenzo Carter, and Markus Golden returned the fumble for a Giants touchdown. Unfortunately, Josh Gordon suffered ankle and knee injuries while trying to make the tackle. He would be out for the remainder of the game which further hindered the Patriots' already depleted offense with Phillip Dorsett having been ruled out prior to the matchup. New England would counter on their next drive by scoring on a 1-yard quarterback sneak by Brady. Entering the second half, the Patriots led 21–14. On the very first possession, Jones was intercepted for the third time of the game, this time by Stephon Gilmore. New England marched 60 yards down the field, but the drive stalled at the New York 22. Mike Nugent missed the 40-yard field goal, his first at Gillette Stadium. Both teams exchanged punts thereafter. New England would score on a forced fumble by Jamie Collins which was returned by Kyle Van Noy for a touchdown. Additionally, on the next New England possession, they scored another touchdown on a 1-yard QB sneak by Brady. With no score changes for the remainder of the game, the Patriots finished with a 35–14 victory.

Although the score remained close in the first half, the Patriots gradually pulled away in the second half thanks to their defense. On New England's first possession, Tom Brady surpassed Peyton Manning for second on the all-time passing list. With Josh Gordon and Phillip Dorsett both having sustained injuries, the offense had to increasingly rely on other contributors; Julian Edelman particularly stood out with his nine receptions for 113 yards, while Sony Michel rushed for 86 yards on 22 carries. Brady also had an unexpected two rushing touchdowns, both on quarterback sneaks. Rookie wide receivers Jakobi Meyers and Gunner Olszewski had their best games of the season thus far, combining for almost 100 yards receiving. The defense intercepted Jones three times and forced a fumble that was returned for a touchdown. On special teams, Chase Winovich returned a blocked punt for a touchdown.

==== Week 7: at New York Jets ====
Week Seven: New England Patriots at New York Jets – Game summary

Quarter	1	2	3	4	Total
**Patriots**	17	7	2	7	**33**
Jets	0	0	0	0	**0**

at MetLife Stadium, East Rutherford, New Jersey

- Date: October 21
- Game time: 8:15 p.m. EDT
- Game weather: Mostly clear, 58 °F (14 °C)
- Game attendance: 78,523
- Referee: Shawn Hochuli
- TV announcers (ESPN/WCVB): Joe Tessitore, Booger McFarland, Lisa Salters and John Parry
- Recap, Game Book

Game information

**First quarter**

- NE – Sony Michel 3-yard run (Mike Nugent kick), 6:13. Patriots 7–0. **Drive: 16 plays, 78 yards, 8:47.**
- NE – Mike Nugent 34-yard field goal, 3:49. Patriots 10–0. **Drive: 4 plays, −4 yards, 1:27.**
- NE – Phillip Dorsett 26-yard pass from Tom Brady (Mike Nugent kick), 0:09. Patriots 17–0. **Drive: 7 plays, 67 yards, 2:20.**

**Second quarter**

- NE – Sony Michel 1-yard run (Mike Nugent kick), 9:18. Patriots 24–0. **Drive: 9 plays, 38 yards, 4:53.**

**Third quarter**

- NE – Ryan Kalil fumbled, ball out of bounds in end zone for Safety, 7:41. Patriots 26–0.

**Fourth quarter**

- NE – Sony Michel 1-yard run (Mike Nugent kick), 12:32. Patriots 33–0. **Drive: 11 plays, 59 yards, 4:42.**

**Top passers**

- NE – Tom Brady – 31/45, 249 yards, TD, INT
- NYJ – Sam Darnold – 11/32, 86 yards, 4 INT

**Top rushers**

- NE – Sony Michel – 19 rushes, 42 yards, 3 TD
- NYJ – Le'Veon Bell – 15 rushes, 70 yards

**Top receivers**

- NE – James White – 7 receptions, 59 yards
- NYJ – Demaryius Thomas – 3 receptions, 42 yards

Facing the New York Jets for the second time of the season, the Patriots hoped to continue their win streak. Unlike last time, Sam Darnold returned from his injury and was healthy to start the game. New England started with the ball and scored on a 3-yard run by Sony Michel in a 16-play, 78-yard drive that drained 8:47 off the clock. The Jets sought to respond with a score but Darnold threw a hurried pass due to the blitz and was intercepted by Devin McCourty, his fifth this season. After failing to obtain a first down, New England settled for a 34-yard field goal. On the ensuing drive, New York went three-and-out and the Patriots took advantage by scoring on a 26-yard pass to Phillip Dorsett. With this touchdown, New England was up 17–0. John Simon had a strip sack on Darnold and Kyle Van Noy recovered. The Patriots would score off another turnover, this time on another run by Sony Michel. New York finally gained momentum on a drive, reaching the Patriots 19, but Darnold made another ill-advised decision on a pass that was intercepted by Duron Harmon. Starting at their own 1, the Patriots' offense went three-and-out. Although the defense managed to make another stop on New York's struggling offense. Neither team scored for the rest of the half and the Patriots led 24–0 entering the second half. On the Jets' very first drive, Darnold was picked by Stephon Gilmore. New England failed to capitalize off the turnover but the defense recorded a safety after a high snap by Jets center Ryan Kalil. Unfortunately for the Patriots, Tom Brady was hit while trying to throw the ball and was intercepted by Trumaine Johnson. Despite being at the New England 33, the Jets failed to score as Darnold was picked off for the fourth time, this time by Terrence Brooks. For much of the remainder of the matchup, both teams only punted. Though, New England would score one final touchdown on a 1-yard run by Sony Michel, giving them a 33–0 shutout win.

The Patriots defense continued their historic dominance in a 33–0 shutout over the New York Jets. They became the second team to have multiple 30-points shutouts since the 1942 Chicago Bears. Additionally, New England has outscored their opponents in a 223–48 margin thus far, a 175-point difference. Their win also allowed them to improve to 7–0 for the third time in franchise history after the 2007 and 2015 seasons. This was the twelfth consecutive victory (including playoffs) for New England, stemming back to the Week 16 of the 2018 season. Also of significance, Devin McCourty obtained his fifth interception of the season, leading the league in this category as of Week 7. Jets quarterback Sam Darnold struggled immensely, finishing with a mere 3.6 QB rating and four interceptions.

==== Week 8: vs. Cleveland Browns ====
Week Eight: Cleveland Browns at New England Patriots – Game summary

Quarter	1	2	3	4	Total
Browns	0	7	3	3	**13**
**Patriots**	17	0	7	3	**27**

at Gillette Stadium, Foxborough, Massachusetts

- Date: October 27
- Game time: 4:25 p.m. EDT
- Game weather: Rain, 49 °F (9 °C)
- Game attendance: 65,878
- Referee: Tony Corrente
- TV announcers (CBS): Jim Nantz, Tony Romo, Tracy Wolfson and Gene Steratore
- Recap, Game Book

Game information

**First quarter**

- NE – Mike Nugent 20-yard field goal, 6:35. Patriots 3–0. **Drive: 12 plays, 71 yards, 5:53.**
- NE – Dont'a Hightower 26-yard fumble return (Mike Nugent kick), 5:45. Patriots 10–0.
- NE – Julian Edelman 8-yard pass from Tom Brady (Mike Nugent kick), 1:47. Patriots 17–0. **Drive: 2 plays, 11 yards, 0:44.**

**Second quarter**

- CLE – Demetrius Harris 21-yard pass from Baker Mayfield (Austin Seibert kick), 7:44. Patriots 17–7. **Drive: 6 plays, 54 yards, 3:28.**

**Third quarter**

- CLE – Austin Seibert 38-yard field goal, 8:37. Patriots 17–10. **Drive: 12 plays, 55 yards, 6:23.**
- NE – Julian Edelman 14-yard pass from Tom Brady (Mike Nugent kick), 6:11. Patriots 24–10. **Drive: 7 plays, 84 yards, 2:26.**

**Fourth quarter**

- NE – Mike Nugent 29-yard field goal, 7:43. Patriots 27–10. **Drive: 11 plays, 62 yards, 5:27.**
- CLE – Austin Seibert 47-yard field goal, 2:33. Patriots 27–13. **Drive: 7 plays, 47 yards, 1:34.**

**Top passers**

- CLE – Baker Mayfield – 20/31, 194 yards, TD, INT
- NE – Tom Brady – 20/36, 259 yards, 2 TD

**Top rushers**

- CLE – Nick Chubb – 20 rushes, 131 yards
- NE – Sony Michel – 21 rushes, 74 yards

**Top receivers**

- CLE – Jarvis Landry – 5 receptions, 65 yards
- NE – Julian Edelman – 8 receptions, 78 yards, 2 TD

On a rainy Sunday evening, the Patriots faced the Cleveland Browns, whom were coming off a bye week. Starting with the ball, New England had a slow start on offense. Sony Michel rushed for 10 yards on the first play, but the drive would soon stall. Cleveland went three-and-out on their first possession; and on the ensuing Patriots possession, they reached the Browns' 2 but were forced to settle for a field goal. They would score again after Kyle Van Noy returned 26-yard fumble – in which Nick Chubb lost the ball after his own lineman's foot knocked it loose – for a touchdown. Notably during the kickoff, rookie punter Jake Bailey completed his first kick as the replacement for the recently injured Stephen Gostkowski. Surprisingly, Chubb, on the Browns' next drive, would fumble again after rushing past New England defenders to the Patriots 16 and Jonathan Jones striking the ball out. The Patriots would soon punt after gaining possession. On Cleveland's first play, Baker Mayfield threw a shovel pass pick to Lawrence Guy who returned it to the Browns' 11. Tom Brady would hit Julian Edelman on an 8-yard touchdown, two plays later. Finally ending their streak of turnovers, the Browns reached midfield and punted. New England would go three-and-out on the next possession, and the Browns responded with a 21-yard touchdown pass to Demetrius Harris in an 8-play, 54-yard drive. Seeking to counter, New England attempted a field goal at the Browns 11, but it was blocked by Denzel Ward. Entering the second half, the Patriots were leading 17–7. On the first possession, Cleveland marched to the New England 11, however, a Jamie Collins sack halted their advance. The Patriots answered with a touchdown. During the drive, James White recorded a 59-yard catch-and-run on a screen and Brady connected with Edelman for their second touchdown of the day. Both teams traded punts for the rest of the third quarter. New England would manage to reach the red zone once again, but yet another possession was hampered, and they obtained a field goal. After a series of sacks and penalties on Cleveland, their drive lost momentum immediately and they failed to convert on 4th and 16 at their own 19. The Patriots sought to capitalize off the stop, but Mike Nugent missed his field goal wide left in what was his last game as a Patriots; he was cut from the team just days later. The Browns would score a field goal on the following possession and neither team would gain anything in particular thereafter. The Patriots won the game 27–13.

The defense helped the Patriots quickly gain an insurmountable 17-point lead through a sequence of turnovers. In fact, they forced turnovers on three consecutive drives by forcing two fumbles on Nick Chubb and intercepting Baker Mayfield on a shovel pass. On one of the fumbles, Dont'a Hightower recovered and registered his first touchdown since Week 1 of the 2012 season. Lawrence Guy managed to record his first career interception off of the botched shovel pass. Meanwhile, despite the weather obstructions, Tom Brady managed to play well, recording two touchdowns and completing multiple remarkable throws. Julian Edelman caught both of Brady's touchdowns and had 8 receptions and 78 yards for the day. Also, without soon-to-be released wideout Josh Gordon, Brady targeted newly acquired receiver Mohamed Sanu, who caught two receptions for 23 yards in his Patriots debut. With this victory, Patriots head coach Bill Belichick obtained his 300th win.

==== Week 9: at Baltimore Ravens ====
Week Nine: New England Patriots at Baltimore Ravens – Game summary

Quarter	1	2	3	4	Total
Patriots	0	13	7	0	**20**
**Ravens**	10	7	7	13	**37**

at M&T Bank Stadium, Baltimore, Maryland

- Date: November 3
- Game time: 8:20 p.m. EST
- Game weather: Cloudy, 48 °F (9 °C)
- Game attendance: 71,157
- Referee: Carl Cheffers
- TV announcers (NBC): Al Michaels, Cris Collinsworth, Michele Tafoya and Terry McAulay
- Recap, Game Book

Game information

**First quarter**

- BAL – Lamar Jackson 3-yard run (Justin Tucker kick), 8:13. Ravens 7–0. **Drive: 11 plays, 75 yards, 6:40.**
- BAL – Justin Tucker 39-yard field goal, 2:29. Ravens 10–0. **Drive: 11 plays, 54 yards, 5:20.**

**Second quarter**

- BAL – Gus Edwards 12-yard run (Justin Tucker kick), 14:06. Ravens 17–0. **Drive: 3 plays, 77 yards, 1:35.**
- NE – Mohamed Sanu 4-yard pass from Tom Brady (Nick Folk kick), 12:02. Ravens 17–7. **Drive: 4 plays, 20 yards, 0:39.**
- NE – Nick Folk 22-yard field goal, 3:41. Ravens 17–10. **Drive: 6 plays, 15 yards, 2:48.**
- NE – Nick Folk 19-yard field goal, 0:08. Ravens 17–13. **Drive: 8 plays, 81 yards, 1:35.**

**Third quarter**

- BAL – Marlon Humphrey 70-yard fumble return (Justin Tucker kick), 12:21. Ravens 24–13.
- NE – James White 1-yard run (Nick Folk kick), 8:03. Ravens 24–20. **Drive: 11 plays, 75 yards, 4:18.**

**Fourth quarter**

- BAL – Nick Boyle 5-yard pass from Lamar Jackson (kick failed, wide left), 14:54. Ravens 30–20. **Drive: 14 plays, 81 yards, 8:09.**
- BAL – Lamar Jackson 1-yard run (Justin Tucker kick), 3:12. Ravens 37–20. **Drive: 14 plays, 68 yards, 9:35.**

**Top passers**

- NE – Tom Brady – 30/46, 285 yards, TD, INT
- BAL – Lamar Jackson – 17/23, 163 yards, TD

**Top rushers**

- NE – James White – 9 rushes, 38 yards
- BAL – Mark Ingram II – 15 rushes, 115 yards

**Top receivers**

- NE – Julian Edelman – 10 receptions, 89 yards
- BAL – Marquise Brown – 3 receptions, 48 yards

The Patriots came into this game 8–0 as one of two undefeated teams in the NFL alongside the San Francisco 49ers. In the first drive of the game, the Ravens converted twice on 3rd down. Seven of the Ravens' plays in their first drive were runs by Lamar Jackson, Mark Ingram II, and Gus Edwards. On 3rd down, the Patriots seemingly held the Ravens to a field goal attempt, but a neutral zone infraction by Shilque Calhoun gave the Ravens a first down which then led to a 3-yard rushing touchdown by quarterback Lamar Jackson. On the Patriots' first possession, Tom Brady threw 3 straight incomplete passes which led to a punt. The next drive, the Patriots defense showed improvement, holding the Ravens to a field goal. The Patriots, however, did not improve offensively as they had to punt after a 9-yard sack by Patrick Onwuasor. After the first quarter the Ravens led 10–0.

The next drive was highlighted by a 53-yard run by Mark Ingram II, and finished with a 12-yard rushing touchdown by Gus Edwards pushing the Ravens lead to 17–0. The Patriots once again failed to score after another three-and-out, but caught a break after former Patriot Cyrus Jones muffed a punt by Jake Bailey (recovered by newly acquired special teamer Justin Bethel at the Baltimore 20 yard line). This led to a touchdown by newly acquired receiver Mohamed Sanu, who become the 74th player to catch a touchdown pass from Tom Brady. After a three-and-out by the Ravens, the Patriots sustained a drive, only to have a holding penalty on Marshall Newhouse and an intentional grounding call lead to a punt. The Patriots were set up in good field position after a fumble recovered by Lawrence Guy at the Ravens' 19 yard line; however, the drive stalled at the 4 yard line. The resulting field goal closed the score to 17–10. After a Ravens punt, the Patriots reached the Baltimore 1 yard line after a touchdown by James White was reversed on replay. Controversially, Patriots coach Belichick chose to kick a field goal on 4th and Goal at the 1, leaving the game 17–13 at the half.

At the start of the 3rd quarter the Patriots advanced to the Baltimore 30 led by receptions of 11 and 15 yards by Mohamed Sanu. A fumble by Julian Edelman was then returned 70 yards by Marlon Humphrey for a touchdown, widening the Ravens' lead to 24–13. The Patriots scored on their next drive on a 4-yard rushing touchdown on 3rd and 3 by James White. However, on the next drive, which lasted 14 plays and took 8:09 off the clock, the Ravens scored again, assisted by 16 and 18 yard receptions by Marquise Brown and Mark Andrews. The drive climaxed in a 5-yard pass to Nick Boyle to make the lead 30–20 (the PAT missed by Justin Tucker).

In the 4th quarter, down two scores, Brady threw an interception to Earl Thomas which ultimately killed any chance of winning for the Patriots. Lamar Jackson ran for a 1-yard touchdown after a 14 play drive, icing the game at 37–20. The game was viewed as an impressive win by the Ravens, with Lamar Jackson becoming a front runner for MVP.

This was the Patriots' first loss since December 16, 2018 against the Pittsburgh Steelers, snapping a 13-game winning streak (including postseason). It was also their first loss to Baltimore since the 2012 AFC Championship game.

==== Week 11: at Philadelphia Eagles ====
Week Eleven: New England Patriots at Philadelphia Eagles – Game summary

Quarter	1	2	3	4	Total
**Patriots**	0	9	8	0	**17**
Eagles	3	7	0	0	**10**

at Lincoln Financial Field, Philadelphia, Pennsylvania

- Date: November 17
- Game time: 4:25 p.m. EST
- Game weather: Cloudy, 42 °F (6 °C)
- Game attendance: 69,796
- Referee: Bill Vinovich
- TV announcers (CBS): Jim Nantz, Tony Romo and Tracy Wolfson
- Recap, Game Book

Game information

**First quarter**

- PHI – Jake Elliott 42-yard field goal, 13:38. Eagles 3–0. **Drive: 4 plays, 51 yards, 1:22.**

**Second quarter**

- PHI – Dallas Goedert 5-yard pass from Carson Wentz (Jake Elliott kick), 12:36. Eagles 10–0. **Drive: 16 plays, 95 yards, 9:33.**
- NE – Nick Folk 35-yard field goal, 8:37. Eagles 10–3. **Drive: 13 plays, 59 yards, 3:59.**
- NE – Nick Folk 22-yard field goal, 3:21. Eagles 10–6. **Drive: 11 plays, 44 yards, 3:20.**
- NE – Nick Folk 39-yard field goal, 1:44. Eagles 10–9. **Drive: 4 plays, 1 yard, 0:42.**

**Third quarter**

- NE - Phillip Dorsett 15-yard pass from Julian Edelman (James White run), 10:49. Patriots 17–10. **Drive: 10 plays, 84 yards, 4:11**

**Fourth quarter**

- No scoring plays.

**Top passers**

- PHI – Carson Wentz – 20/40, 214 yards, TD
- NE – Tom Brady – 26/47, 216 yards

**Top rushers**

- PHI – Miles Sanders – 11 rushes, 38 yards
- NE – Sony Michel – 10 rushes, 33 yards

**Top receivers**

- PHI – Zach Ertz – 9 receptions, 94 yards
- NE – Julian Edelman – 5 receptions, 53 yards

In a rematch of Super Bowl LII, the Patriots won a defensive battle 17–10. Their only touchdown came on a trick play in the third quarter, in which Tom Brady threw a screen pass to Julian Edelman who then proceeded to throw a touchdown pass to Phillip Dorsett. With this win, the Patriots secured a winning season for the 19th year in a row.

==== Week 12: vs. Dallas Cowboys ====
Week Twelve: Dallas Cowboys at New England Patriots – Game summary

Quarter	1	2	3	4	Total
Cowboys	0	6	0	3	**9**
**Patriots**	7	3	0	3	**13**

at Gillette Stadium, Foxborough, Massachusetts

- Date: November 24
- Game time: 4:25 p.m. EST
- Game weather: Rain and wind, 38 °F (3 °C)
- Game attendance: 65,878
- Referee: Scott Novak
- TV announcers (Fox): Joe Buck, Troy Aikman and Erin Andrews
- Recap, Game Book

Game information

**First quarter**

- NE – N'Keal Harry 10-yard pass from Tom Brady (Nick Folk kick), 0:45. Patriots 7–0. **Drive: 2 plays, 12 yards, 0:43.**

**Second quarter**

- NE – Nick Folk 44-yard field goal, 12:46. Patriots 10–0. **Drive: 4 plays, 3 yards, 1:31.**
- DAL – Brett Maher 46-yard field goal, 8:36. Patriots 10–3. **Drive: 9 plays, 42 yards, 4:10.**
- DAL – Brett Maher 27-yard field goal, 2:28. Patriots 10–6. **Drive: 9 plays, 55 yards, 4:18.**

**Third quarter**

- No scoring plays.

**Fourth quarter**

- NE – Nick Folk 42-yard field goal, 9:32. Patriots 13–6. **Drive: 12 plays, 38 yards, 6:02.**
- DAL – Brett Maher 29-yard field goal, 6:04. Patriots 13–9. **Drive: 8 plays, 78 yards, 3:28.**

**Top passers**

- DAL – Dak Prescott – 19/33, 212 yards, INT
- NE – Tom Brady – 17/37, 190 yards, TD

**Top rushers**

- DAL – Ezekiel Elliott – 21 rushes, 86 yards
- NE – Sony Michel – 20 rushes, 85 yards

**Top receivers**

- DAL – Randall Cobb – 4 receptions, 86 yards
- NE – Julian Edelman – 8 receptions, 93 yards

With the win, the Patriots set a new NFL record with 17 consecutive 10-win seasons, surpassing the San Francisco 49ers, who set the original record of 16 consecutive 10-win seasons from 1983 to 1998. They also defeated all four of their NFC opponents for the first time since 2010.

==== Week 13: at Houston Texans ====
Week Thirteen: New England Patriots at Houston Texans – Game summary

Quarter	1	2	3	4	Total
Patriots	3	0	6	13	**22**
**Texans**	7	7	7	7	**28**

at NRG Stadium, Houston, Texas

- Date: December 1
- Game time: 8:20 p.m. EST/7:20 p.m. CST
- Game weather: None (retractable roof closed)
- Game attendance: 72,025
- Referee: Tony Corrente
- TV announcers (NBC): Al Michaels, Cris Collinsworth, Michele Tafoya and Terry McAulay
- Recap, Game Book

Game information

**First quarter**

- NE – Kai Forbath 23-yard field goal, 7:04. Patriots 3–0. **Drive: 14 plays, 69 yards, 7:01.**
- HOU – Duke Johnson 14-yard pass from Deshaun Watson (Kaʻimi Fairbairn kick), 0:38. Texans 7–3. **Drive: 3 plays, 21 yards, 1:20.**

**Second quarter**

- HOU – Darren Fells 13-yard pass from Deshaun Watson (Kaʻimi Fairbairn kick), 6:21. Texans 14–3. **Drive: 13 plays, 88 yards, 6:52.**

**Third quarter**

- HOU – Kenny Stills 35-yard pass from Deshaun Watson (Kaʻimi Fairbairn kick), 5:41. Texans 21–3. **Drive: 6 plays, 58 yards, 1:27.**
- NE – James White 12-yard pass from Tom Brady (kick failed), 0:11. Texans 21–9. **Drive: 12 plays, 75 yards, 5:30.**

**Fourth quarter**

- HOU – Deshaun Watson 6-yard pass from DeAndre Hopkins (Kaʻimi Fairbairn kick), 9:53. Texans 28–9. **Drive: 9 plays, 75 yards, 5:18.**
- NE – James White 11-yard pass from Tom Brady (pass failed), 3:42. Texans 28–15. **Drive: 13 plays, 75 yards, 6:11.**
- NE – Julian Edelman 20-yard pass from Tom Brady (Kai Forbath kick), 0:50. Texans 28–22. **Drive: 6 plays, 94 yards, 1:46.**

**Top passers**

- NE – Tom Brady – 24/47, 326 yards, 3 TD, INT
- HOU – Deshaun Watson – 18/25, 234 yards, 3 TD

**Top rushers**

- NE – James White – 14 carries, 79 yards
- HOU – Duke Johnson – 9 carries, 36 yards

**Top receivers**

- NE – Julian Edelman – 6 receptions, 106 yards, TD
- HOU – DeAndre Hopkins – 5 receptions, 64 yards

The loss snapped the Patriots' eight-game winning streak against the Texans, losing to them for the first time since the 2009 season.

==== Week 14: vs. Kansas City Chiefs ====
Week Fourteen: Kansas City Chiefs at New England Patriots – Game summary

Quarter	1	2	3	4	Total
**Chiefs**	3	17	3	0	**23**
Patriots	7	0	6	3	**16**

at Gillette Stadium, Foxborough, Massachusetts

- Date: December 8
- Game time: 4:25 p.m. EST
- Game weather: Cloudy, 32 °F (0 °C)
- Game attendance: 65,878
- Referee: Jerome Boger
- TV announcers (CBS): Jim Nantz, Tony Romo and Tracy Wolfson
- Recap, Game Book

Game information

**First quarter**

- NE – Julian Edelman 37-yard pass from Tom Brady (Nick Folk kick), 12:34. Patriots 7–0. **Drive: 5 plays, 83 yards, 2:26.**
- KC - Harrison Butker 48-yard field goal, 7:12. Patriots 7–3. **Drive: 9 plays, 53 yards, 3:46.**

**Second quarter**

- KC - Mecole Hardman 48-yard pass from Patrick Mahomes (Harrison Butker kick), 13:04. Chiefs 10–7. **Drive: 7 plays, 58 yards, 3:56.**
- KC - Travis Kelce 4-yard run (Harrison Butker kick), 9:33. Chiefs 17–7. **Drive: 7 plays, 35 yards, 3:20.**
- KC - Harrison Butker 31-yard field goal, 0:59. Chiefs 20–7. **Drive: 10 plays, 74 yards, 1:49.**

**Third quarter**

- KC - Harrison Butker 31-yard field goal, 8:46. Chiefs 23–7. **Drive: 11 plays, 52 yards, 6:14.**
- NE - Brandon Bolden 10-yard run (James White run failed), 4:23. Chiefs 23–13. **Drive: 2 plays, 19 yards, 0:51.**

**Fourth quarter**

- NE – Nick Folk 29-yard field goal, 11:42. Chiefs 23–16. **Drive: 9 plays, 46 yards, 3:25.**

**Top passers**

- KC – Patrick Mahomes – 26/40, 283 yards, TD, INT
- NE – Tom Brady – 19/36, 169 yards, TD, INT

**Top rushers**

- KC – LeSean McCoy – 11 rushes, 39 yards
- NE – James White – 6 rushes, 33 yards

**Top receivers**

- KC – Travis Kelce – 7 receptions, 66 yards
- NE – Julian Edelman – 8 receptions, 95 yards

This was the Pats' second loss in a row this season, and their first home loss since October 1, 2017 against the Carolina Panthers. A game tying drive in the fourth quarter was halted by a turnover on downs with 1:11 left. Following the loss, Tom Brady posted "We're on to Cincinnati", referencing Bill Belichick's famous line from a press conference following a loss in 2014 against the Chiefs, where the Patriots were also scheduled to play the Bengals the following week.

==== Week 15: at Cincinnati Bengals ====
Week Fifteen: New England Patriots at Cincinnati Bengals – Game summary

Quarter	1	2	3	4	Total
**Patriots**	7	6	14	7	**34**
Bengals	10	0	0	3	**13**

at Paul Brown Stadium, Cincinnati, Ohio

- Date: December 15
- Game time: 1:00 p.m. EST
- Game weather: Cloudy, 36 °F (2 °C)
- Game attendance: 57,066
- Referee: Alex Kemp
- TV announcers (CBS): Andrew Catalon, James Lofton and Amanda Balionis
- Recap, Game Book

Game information

**First quarter**

- NE – James White 23-yard pass from Tom Brady (Nick Folk kick), 11:44. Patriots 7–0. **Drive: 8 plays, 75 yards, 3:16.**
- CIN - Cethan Carter 8-yard pass from Andy Dalton (Randy Bullock kick), 6:13. Tied 7–7. **Drive: 9 plays, 75 yards, 5:31.**
- CIN - Randy Bullock 34-yard field goal, 0:14. Bengals 10–7. **Drive: 9 plays, 49 yards, 5:02.**

**Second quarter**

- NE - Nick Folk 40-yard field goal, 3:51. Tied 10–10. **Drive: 8 plays, 47 yards, 3:18.**
- NE - Nick Folk 46-yard field goal, 0:05. Patriots 13–10. **Drive: 4 plays, -5 yards, 1:25.**

**Third quarter**

- NE - N'Keal Harry 7-yard pass from Tom Brady (Nick Folk kick), 11:17. Patriots 20–10. **Drive: 7 plays, 43 yards, 2:59.**
- NE - Stephon Gilmore 64-yard interception return (Nick Folk kick), 7:21. Patriots 27–10.

**Fourth quarter**

- CIN - Randy Bullock 48-yard field goal, 6:33. Patriots 27–13. **Drive: 13 plays, 41 yards, 5:38.**
- NE - Rex Burkhead 33-yard run (Nick Folk kick), 5:31. Patriots 34–13. **Drive: 2 plays, 40 yards, 1:02.**

**Top passers**

- CIN – Andy Dalton – 17/31, 151 yards, TD, 4 INT
- NE – Tom Brady – 15/29, 128 yards, 2 TD

**Top rushers**

- CIN – Joe Mixon – 25 rushes, 136 yards
- NE – Sony Michel – 19 rushes, 89 yards

**Top receivers**

- CIN – Tyler Eifert – 3 receptions, 44 yards
- NE – James White – 3 receptions, 49 yards

This was the Pats' first win in Cincinnati since 2007, the same year the Pats became the first team to win all regular season games since the league expanded to 16 games in 1978. They also avoided a possible 3-game losing streak for the first time since 2002.

==== Week 16: vs. Buffalo Bills ====
Week Sixteen: Buffalo Bills at New England Patriots – Game summary

Quarter	1	2	3	4	Total
Bills	3	7	7	0	**17**
**Patriots**	7	3	3	11	**24**

at Gillette Stadium, Foxborough, Massachusetts

- Date: December 21
- Game time: 4:30 p.m. EST
- Game weather: Cloudy and cool, 33 °F (1 °C)
- Game attendance: 65,878
- Referee: John Hussey
- TV announcers (NFLN/WBZ): Mike Tirico, Kurt Warner and Peter Schrager
- Recap, Game Book

Game information

**First quarter**

- BUF – Stephen Hauschka 35-yard field goal, 9:16. Bills 3–0. **Drive: 7 plays, 14 yards, 3:15.**
- NE – Matt LaCosse 8-yard pass from Tom Brady (Nick Folk kick), 1:50. Patriots 7–3. **Drive: 11 plays, 75 yards, 7:20.**

**Second quarter**

- NE – Nick Folk 36-yard field goal, 5:04. Patriots 10–3. **Drive: 17 plays, 81 yards, 8:58.**
- BUF – Dion Dawkins 1-yard pass from Josh Allen (Stephen Hauschka kick), 0:01. Tied 10–10. **Drive: 6 plays, 59 yards, 0:32.**

**Third quarter**

- NE – Nick Folk 51-yard field goal, 9:54. Patriots 13–10. **Drive: 7 plays, 44 yards, 3:16.**
- BUF – John Brown 53-yard pass from Josh Allen (Stephen Hauschka kick), 7:25. Bills 17–13. **Drive: 5 plays, 64 yards, 2:23.**

**Fourth quarter**

- NE – Nick Folk 20-yard field goal, 10:45. Bills 17–16. **Drive: 11 plays, 77 yards, 6:40.**
- NE – Rex Burkhead 1-yard run (Tom Brady–Julian Edelman pass), 5:06. Patriots 24–17. **Drive: 7 plays, 59 yards, 3:55.**

**Top passers**

- BUF – Josh Allen – 13/26, 208 yards, 2 TD
- NE – Tom Brady – 26/33, 271 yards, TD

**Top rushers**

- BUF – Devin Singletary – 15 rushes, 46 yards
- NE – Sony Michel – 21 yards, 96 yards

**Top receivers**

- BUF – Cole Beasley – 7 receptions, 108 yards
- NE – Julian Edelman – 5 receptions, 72 yards

Despite dominating time of possession in the first half, New England found itself tied with Buffalo by halftime due to a Rex Burkhead fumble on the opening drive and a failed fourth down conversion, which led to points for the Bills. After a back-and-forth third quarter, New England regained the lead as Burkhead scored a go-ahead touchdown with just over 5 minutes to go. Buffalo drove down the field on its final drive, but the Patriots defense stifled Josh Allen and the Bills offense as the drive stalled at the New England 14-yard line. With the win, the Patriots improved to 12–3, clinching the AFC East divisional title for the 11th straight year. This would end up being Tom Brady's final win in a Patriots uniform. This also marked the last time the Patriots clinched the AFC East until 2025. This still remains the Patriots most recent sweep over the Bills.

==== Week 17: vs. Miami Dolphins ====
Week Seventeen: Miami Dolphins at New England Patriots – Game summary

Quarter	1	2	3	4	Total
**Dolphins**	3	7	7	10	**27**
Patriots	0	10	7	7	**24**

at Gillette Stadium, Foxborough, Massachusetts

- Date: December 29
- Game time: 1:00 p.m. EST
- Game weather: Partly cloudy, 43 °F (6 °C)
- Game attendance: 65,878
- Referee: Clay Martin
- TV announcers (CBS): Greg Gumbel, Trent Green and Melanie Collins
- Recap, Game Book

Game information

**First quarter**

- MIA - Jason Sanders 27-yard field goal, 1:38. Dolphins 3–0. **Drive: 12 plays, 80 yards, 6:57.**

**Second quarter**

- MIA – Eric Rowe 35-yard interception return (Jason Sanders kick), 10:31. Dolphins 10–0.
- NE - Nick Folk 25-yard field goal, 5:51. Dolphins 10–3. **Drive: 12 plays, 68 yards, 4:40.**
- NE - Sony Michel 4-yard run (Nick Folk kick), 2:05. Tied 10–10. **Drive: 5 plays, 82 yards, 2:17.**

**Third quarter**

- MIA - Ryan Fitzpatrick 2-yard run (Jason Sanders kick), 7:42. Dolphins 17–10. **Drive: 9 plays, 83 yards, 5:22.**
- NE - Elandon Roberts 38-yard pass from Tom Brady (Nick Folk kick), 4:26. Tied 17–17. **Drive: 8 plays, 75 yards, 3:16.**

**Fourth quarter**

- MIA - Jason Sanders 32-yard field goal, 8:29. Dolphins 20–17. **Drive: 9 plays, 49 yards, 3:23.**
- NE - James White 13-yard pass from Tom Brady (Nick Folk kick), 3:53. Patriots 24–20. **Drive: 8 plays, 60 yards, 4:36.**
- MIA - Mike Gesicki 5-yard pass from Ryan Fitzpatrick (Jason Sanders kick), 0:24. Dolphins 27–24. **Drive: 13 plays, 75 yards, 3:29.**

**Top passers**

- MIA – Ryan Fitzpatrick – 28/41, 320 yards, TD
- NE – Tom Brady – 16/29, 221 yards, 2 TD, INT

**Top rushers**

- MIA – Patrick Laird – 11 rushes, 21 yards
- NE – Sony Michel – 18 rushes, 74 yards

**Top receivers**

- MIA – DeVante Parker – 8 receptions, 137 yards
- NE – Mohamed Sanu – 3 receptions, 35 yards

This was Dolphins head coach Brian Flores's first return to Gillette Stadium since leaving the Patriots following the win in Super Bowl LIII. Flores served 15 years as a scout and assistant to Bill Belichick. This was the Pats' first loss to Miami at home since 2008, which was also the last season the Patriots failed to win their division or make the playoffs. With the loss, coupled with a Kansas City Chiefs win, the Patriots failed to earn a first-round bye in the AFC playoffs for the first time since 2009. This was the only game all season in which the Patriots defense allowed 300 yards passing. This also ended up being quarterback Tom Brady's last regular season game in a Patriots uniform, as he announced on March 17, 2020, that he would leave the Patriots after 20 years with the team and subsequently signed with the Tampa Bay Buccaneers the same day. This also ended up being the final regular season game of the Brady–Belichick era.

=== Standings ===
==== Division ====
AFC East
	W	L	T	PCT	DIV	CONF	PF	PA	STK
^{(3)} New England Patriots	12	4	0	.750	5–1	8–4	420	225	L1
^{(5)} Buffalo Bills	10	6	0	.625	3–3	7–5	314	259	L2
New York Jets	7	9	0	.438	2–4	4–8	276	359	W2
Miami Dolphins	5	11	0	.313	2–4	4–8	306	494	W2

==== Conference ====
AFC
#	Team	Division	W	L	T	PCT	DIV	CONF	SOS	SOV	STK
**Division leaders**
1	Baltimore Ravens	North	14	2	0	.875	5–1	10–2	.494	.484	W12
2 (Note: Kansas City claimed the No. 2 seed over New England based on head-to-head victory.)	Kansas City Chiefs	West	12	4	0	.750	6–0	9–3	.510	.477	W6
3	New England Patriots	East	12	4	0	.750	5–1	8–4	.469	.411	L1
4	Houston Texans	South	10	6	0	.625	4–2	8–4	.520	.488	L1
**Wild Cards**
5	Buffalo Bills	East	10	6	0	.625	3–3	7–5	.461	.363	L2
6	Tennessee Titans	South	9	7	0	.563	3–3	7–5	.488	.465	W1
**Did not qualify for the postseason**
7	Pittsburgh Steelers	North	8	8	0	.500	3–3	6–6	.502	.324	L3
8 (Note: Denver finished ahead of Indianapolis and NY Jets based on conference record. Division tiebreak was initially used to eliminate Oakland (see below).) (Note: Denver finished ahead of Oakland based on conference record.)	Denver Broncos	West	7	9	0	.438	3–3	6–6	.510	.406	W2
9 (Note: Oakland and Indianapolis finished ahead of NY Jets based on conference record.) (Note: Oakland finished ahead of Indianapolis based on head-to-head victory.)	Oakland Raiders	West	7	9	0	.438	3–3	5–7	.482	.335	L1
10	Indianapolis Colts	South	7	9	0	.438	3–3	5–7	.492	.500	L1
11	New York Jets	East	7	9	0	.438	2–4	4–8	.473	.402	W2
12 (Note: Jacksonville finished ahead of Cleveland based on record against common opponents. Jacksonville's cumulative record against Cincinnati, Denver, NY Jets, and Tennessee was 4–1, compared to Cleveland's 2–3 cumulative record against the same four teams.)	Jacksonville Jaguars	South	6	10	0	.375	2–4	6–6	.484	.406	W1
13	Cleveland Browns	North	6	10	0	.375	3–3	6–6	.533	.479	L3
14 (Note: LA Chargers finished ahead of Miami based on head-to-head victory.)	Los Angeles Chargers	West	5	11	0	.313	0–6	3–9	.514	.488	L3
15	Miami Dolphins	East	5	11	0	.313	2–4	4–8	.484	.463	W2
16	Cincinnati Bengals	North	2	14	0	.125	1–5	2–10	.553	.406	W1
**Tiebreakers** (Note: When breaking ties for three or more teams under the NFL's rules, they are first broken within divisions, then comparing only the highest ranked remaining team from each division.)

== Postseason ==
=== Schedule ===
Round	Date	Opponent (seed)	Result	Record	Venue	NFL.com recap
Wild Card	January 4, 2020	Tennessee Titans (6)	L 13–20	0–1	Gillette Stadium	Recap

=== Game summaries ===
==== AFC Wild Card Playoffs: vs. (6) Tennessee Titans ====
AFC Wild Card Playoffs: (6) Tennessee Titans at (3) New England Patriots – Game summary

Quarter	1	2	3	4	Total
Titans	7	7	0	6	20
Patriots	3	10	0	0	13

at Gillette Stadium, Foxborough, Massachusetts

- Date: January 4, 2020
- Game time: 8:15 p.m. EST
- Game weather: Foggy, 44 °F (7 °C)
- Game attendance: 65,878
- Referee: John Hussey
- TV announcers (CBS): Jim Nantz, Tony Romo and Tracy Wolfson
- Recap, Game Book

Game information

First quarter

- NE - Nick Folk 36-yard field goal, 12:37. Patriots 3–0. Drive: 8 plays, 57 yards, 2:23.
- TEN - Anthony Firkser 12-yard pass from Ryan Tannehill (Greg Joseph kick), 5:39. Titans 7–3. Drive: 12 plays, 75 yards, 6:58.

Second quarter

- NE - Julian Edelman 5-yard run (Nick Folk kick), 14:57. Patriots 10–7. Drive: 10 plays, 75 yards, 5:42.
- NE - Nick Folk 21-yard field goal, 2:16. Patriots 13–7. Drive: 10 plays, 44 yards, 5:44.
- TEN - Derrick Henry 1-yard run (Greg Joseph kick), 0:35. Titans 14–13. Drive: 7 plays, 75 yards, 1:41.

Third quarter

- No scoring plays.

Fourth quarter

- TEN - Logan Ryan 9-yard interception return (run failed), 0:09. Titans 20–13.

Top passers

- TEN - Ryan Tannehill - 8/15, 72 yards, TD, INT
- NE - Tom Brady - 20/37, 209 yards, INT

Top rushers

- TEN - Derrick Henry - 34 rushes, 182 yards, TD
- NE - Sony Michel - 14 rushes, 61 yards

Top receivers

- TEN - Anthony Firkser - 2 receptions, 23 yards, TD
- NE - James White - 5 receptions, 62 yards

With the loss, the Patriots failed to repeat as Super Bowl Champions, a feat that had not been achieved since their 2004 repeat. They also failed to return to the AFC Championship Game for the first time since 2010, and was also the first time the Patriots lost their opening playoff game since that season. It was also their first loss to the Titans at home since 1993, when the Titans were still the Houston Oilers. This was Tom Brady's last game with the Patriots, as he signed with the Tampa Bay Buccaneers in free agency after the season, making it the final game of the Brady–Belichick era. This would be the Patriots' last home playoff game until 2025.

== Awards and honors ==
Recipient	awards	
Jake Bailey	Week 3: AFC Special Teams Player of the Week; Week 11: AFC Special Teams Player of the Week	
Stephon Gilmore	NFL Defensive Player of the Year	October: AFC Defensive Player of the Month
Devin McCourty	September: AFC Defensive Player of the Month	
Matthew Slater	Week 12: AFC Special Teams Player of the Week	
Kyle Van Noy	2019 New England Patriots Ron Burton Community Service Award; Week 4: AFC Defensive Player of the Week	
Chase Winovich	Week 2: Pepsi NFL Rookie of the Week	

== Videotaping controversy ==
During the December 8 game between the Cincinnati Bengals and Cleveland Browns, the Patriots are alleged to have spied on the Bengals' sideline. The Patriots, who were scheduled to play the Bengals the following week, sent a video team to Cleveland to film a documentary of an advance scout, part of the "Do Your Job" series on the Patriots' website. This video contractor was given media credentials by the Browns, but the Bengals and NFL were not made aware of the presence of the Patriots' video crew.

According to ESPN's Dianna Russini, a Bengals staffer spotted the Patriots.com cameraman and proceeded to observe what he was doing. Allegedly, the cameraman proceeded to point his camera at the Bengals coaching staff and sideline for essentially the entire quarter. The Bengals employee reported him to media relations, who reported him to security; security then seized the film and leaked it to Jay Glazer, who made the footage public. The NFL has launched an investigation into these allegations. This was the second time the current Patriots administration had been embroiled in an unauthorized videotaping scandal, following the Spygate controversy in 2007.

As a result, the Patriots were fined $1.1 million and lost a 2021 3rd-round draft pick.
