= Mike Pellegrino =

American lacrosse player and football coach (born 1993)

Philadelphia Eagles
- Title: Secondary coach

Personal information
- Born: July 24, 1993 (age 33); Oakdale, New York, U.S.

Career information
- High school: Connetquot (Bohemia, New York)
- College: Johns Hopkins (lacrosse)

Career history
- New England Patriots (2015–2018) Coaching assistant; New England Patriots (2019–2024) Cornerbacks coach; Buffalo Bills (2025) Nickels coach; Philadelphia Eagles (2026–present) Secondary coach

Awards and highlights
- 2× Super Bowl champion (LI, LIII)

Mike Pellegrino (born July 24, 1993) is an American professional football coach who is the secondary coach for the Philadelphia Eagles of the National Football League (NFL). Prior to joining the Eagles, he previously served as the nickels coach for the Buffalo Bills. He has also served as the cornerbacks coach for the New England Patriots. He is also a former professional lacrosse player.

== Personal life ==
Mike Pellegrino grew up in Oakdale, New York where he attended Connetquot High School. He was a three sport athlete for the Thunderbirds, earning accolades in football, lacrosse and wrestling. Pellegrino was a two first team all-state running back, an Under Armor All-American long-stick midfielder, and an all-league wrestler. In 2010, Pellegrino rushed for 1,363 yards and 18 touchdowns earning him the Hansen award, given to Suffolk County's top football player. His outstanding play at lacrosse earned him a scholarship to Johns-Hopkins University. He is the son of Joseph and Kerri-ann Pellegrino, and he has one brother Joe. Mike married his wife Amanda in 2022.

== Lacrosse career ==
Pellegrino was a star on the Johns Hopkins lacrosse team where he was selected as captain for two years. He was also selected as an All-American twice. In the 2015 Major League Lacrosse Draft, Pellegrino was drafted by the New York Lizards in the second-round where he would play for a year. Thereafter, he joined the Boston Cannons for his second season.

== Coaching career ==
=== New England Patriots ===
Pellegrino joined the Patriots as an intern in 2015. He would serve as a coaching assistant for four seasons in total before being promoted to Cornerbacks Coach in 2019.

Pellegrino was part of the Patriots coaching staff that won Super Bowl LI. In the game, the Patriots defeated the Atlanta Falcons by a score of 34–28 in overtime. He won his second Super Bowl title when the Patriots defeated the Los Angeles Rams in Super Bowl LIII. On January 28, 2025, it was announced that Pellegrino would be leaving the Patriots organization.

=== Buffalo Bills ===
On February 24, 2025, Pellegrino was hired by the Buffalo Bills to serve as the team's nickels coach.

=== Philadelphia Eagles ===
On February 13, 2026, Pellgrino was hired by the Philadelphia Eagles to serve as the team's defensive backs coach.
