= Adam Butler (American football) =

American football player (born 1994)

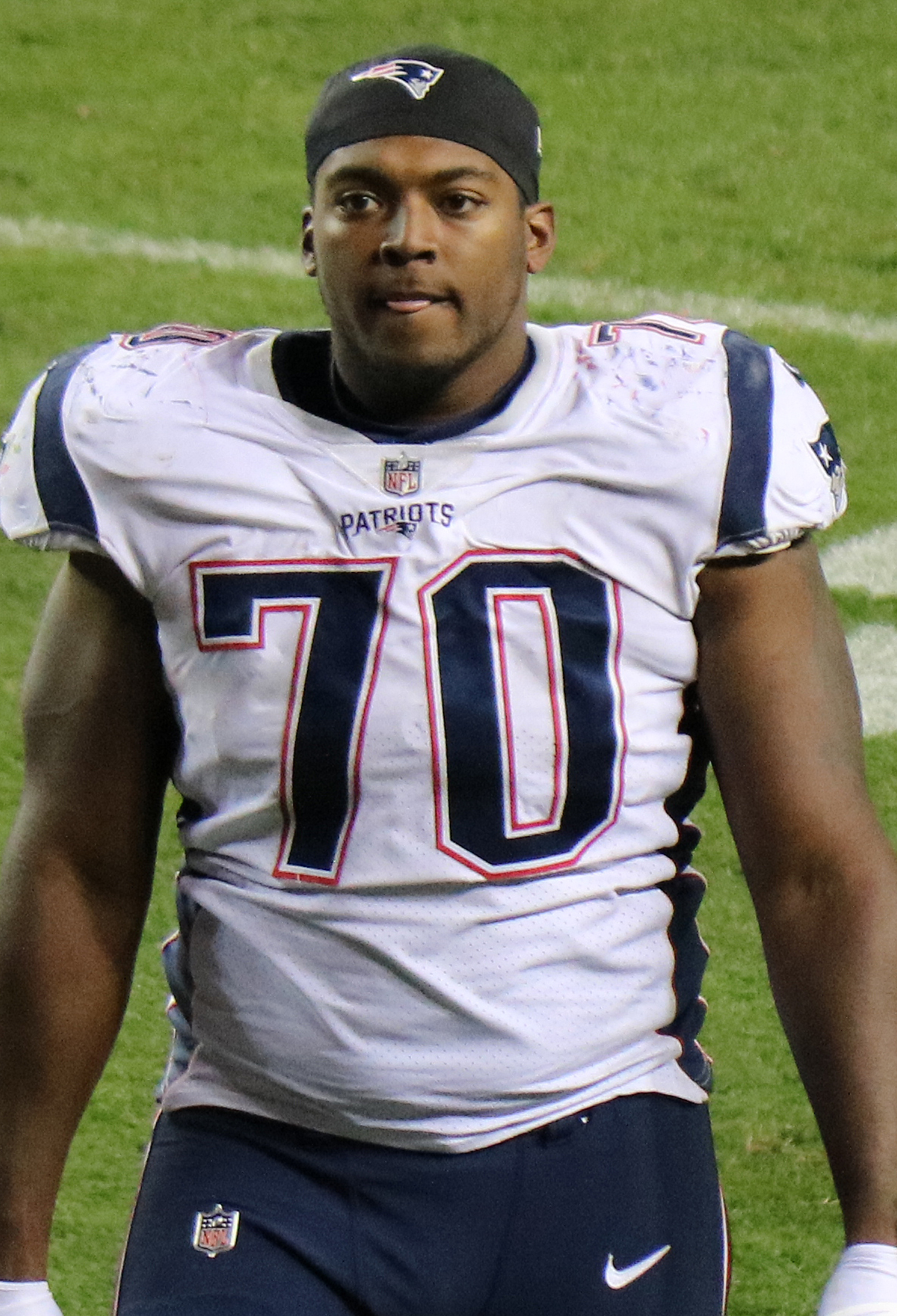
- Butler with the New England Patriots in 2017

No. 69 – Las Vegas Raiders
- Position: Defensive tackle
- Roster status: Active

Personal information
- Born: April 12, 1994 (age 32); Duncanville, Texas, U.S.
- Listed height: 6 ft 4 in (1.93 m)
- Listed weight: 301 lb (137 kg)

Career information
- High school: Duncanville
- College: Vanderbilt (2012–2016)
- NFL draft: 2017: undrafted

Career history
- New England Patriots (2017–2020); Miami Dolphins (2021); Las Vegas Raiders (2023–present)

Awards and highlights
- Super Bowl champion (LIII)

Career NFL statistics as of Week 10, 2026
- Total tackles: 277
- Sacks: 28.5
- Forced fumbles: 4
- Fumble recoveries: 2
- Pass deflections: 18
- Stats at Pro Football Reference

Adam Oneal Butler (born April 12, 1994) is an American professional football defensive tackle for the Las Vegas Raiders of the National Football League (NFL). He played college football for the Vanderbilt Commodores. Butler signed with the New England Patriots as an undrafted free agent after the 2017 NFL draft.

== Early life ==
Butler, a descendant of children's rights campaigner Edna Gladney, attended Duncanville High School in Duncanville, Texas. After starting at defensive end as a sophomore, he moved to left tackle, where he started as a junior and senior. He was a two-time captain of the Duncanville Panthers football team, earning MVP honors his senior season, a season in which he blocked eight field goal attempts in addition to serving as the team’s starting left tackle.

A 3-star offensive guard recruit, Butler committed to Vanderbilt to play college football over offers from Iowa, North Texas, Oklahoma State, and Wyoming.

== College career ==
Butler redshirted his freshman year at Vanderbilt. Going into his redshirt freshman season, he was moved from the offensive line to the defensive line. He played both defensive tackle and defensive end throughout his college career. In four seasons for Vanderbilt, Butler played in 48 games with 35 starts, accumulating 113 total tackles, 10 sacks, two blocked extra points, and one defensive touchdown.

== Professional career ==
Pre-draft measurables
| Height | Weight | Arm length | Hand span | Wingspan | 40-yard dash | 10-yard split | 20-yard split | 20-yard shuttle | Three-cone drill | Vertical jump | Broad jump | Bench press |
|---|---|---|---|---|---|---|---|---|---|---|---|---|
| 6 ft 3 7/8 in (1.93 m) | 293 lb (133 kg) | 32 1/4 in (0.82 m) | 9 3/4 in (0.25 m) | 6 ft 8 in (2.03 m) | 5.23 s | 1.82 s | 2.94 s | 4.90 s | 7.51 s | 28.5 in (0.72 m) | 8 ft 5 in (2.57 m) | 23 reps |
All values from Pro Day

=== New England Patriots ===
Butler signed with the New England Patriots as an undrafted free agent on May 5, 2017. After impressing in the Patriots' training camp and preseason that summer, he earned a spot on the Patriots' 53-man roster. He was active for the Patriots' regular season home opener, seeing 21 snaps and recording a tackle in a 42–27 loss to the Kansas City Chiefs. The Patriots made it to Super Bowl LII, but came up short to the Philadelphia Eagles by a score of 41–33; Butler recorded 1 tackle. The Patriots made it back to the Super Bowl the following season, where they defeated the Los Angeles Rams 13–3 in Super Bowl LIII. In Week 2 of the 2019 season against the Miami Dolphins, Butler recorded 2 sacks as the Patriots won 43–0. In Week 8 against the Cleveland Browns, Butler recorded a team-high 2 sacks on quarterback Baker Mayfield in the 27–13 win.

Butler re-signed on a one-year restricted free agent contract with the Patriots on April 17, 2020.

=== Miami Dolphins ===
On March 18, 2021, Butler signed a two-year contract with the Dolphins. On August 2, 2022, Butler was released because of a failed physical.

=== Las Vegas Raiders ===
On January 27, 2023, Butler signed a reserve/future contract with the Las Vegas Raiders. He played all 17 games, recording 28 tackles, five sacks, four passes defensed, and a forced fumble.

On March 18, 2024, Butler re-signed with the Raiders. He played in every game and recorded a career-high 65 tackles and five sacks.

On March 12, 2025, Butler re-signed with the Raiders on a three-year, $16.5 million contract.

== NFL career statistics ==
Legend
| | Won the Super Bowl |
| | Led the league |
| **Bold** | Career high |

=== Regular season ===
| Year | Team | Games | | Tackles | | | | | Interceptions | | | | | | Fumbles | | | | |
| Year | Team | GP | GS | Cmb | Solo | Ast | Sck | TFL | Int | Yds | Avg | Lng | TD | PD | FF | Fum | FR | Yds | TD |
|---|---|---|---|---|---|---|---|---|---|---|---|---|---|---|---|---|---|---|---|
| 2017 | NE | 16 | 6 | 19 | 11 | 8 | 2.0 | 2 | 0 | 0 | 0.0 | 0 | 0 | 0 | 0 | 0 | 0 | 0 | 0 |
| 2018 | NE | 16 | 0 | 17 | 8 | 9 | 3.0 | 4 | 0 | 0 | 0.0 | 0 | 0 | 2 | **1** | 0 | 0 | 0 | 0 |
| 2019 | NE | 16 | 2 | 26 | 17 | 9 | **6.0** | **8** | 0 | 0 | 0.0 | 0 | 0 | **5** | 0 | 0 | 0 | 0 | 0 |
| 2020 | NE | 15 | 4 | 34 | 18 | 16 | 4.0 | 6 | 0 | 0 | 0.0 | 0 | 0 | 2 | 0 | 0 | 0 | 0 | 0 |
| 2021 | MIA | **17** | 1 | 17 | 9 | 8 | 2.0 | 2 | 0 | 0 | 0.0 | 0 | 0 | 3 | 0 | 0 | 0 | 0 | 0 |
| 2023 | LV | **17** | 0 | 28 | 16 | 12 | 5.0 | **8** | 0 | 0 | 0.0 | 0 | 0 | 4 | **1** | 0 | 0 | 0 | 0 |
| 2024 | LV | **17** | **16** | **65** | **36** | 29 | 5.0 | **8** | 0 | 0 | 0.0 | 0 | 0 | 2 | **1** | 0 | 0 | 0 | 0 |
| 2025 | LV | 15 | 15 | 50 | 20 | **30** | 1.0 | 3 | 0 | 0 | 0.0 | 0 | 0 | 0 | 0 | 0 | **1** | 0 | 0 |
| 2026 | LV | 10 | 6 | 21 | 4 | 17 | 0.5 | 1 | 0 | 0 | 0.0 | 0 | 0 | 0 | 1 | 0 | **1** | 0 | 0 |
| Career | | 139 | 50 | 277 | 139 | 138 | 28.5 | 42 | 0 | 0 | 0.0 | 0 | 0 | 18 | 4 | 0 | 2 | 0 | 0 |

=== Postseason ===
| Year | Team | Games | | Tackles | | | | | Interceptions | | | | | | Fumbles | | | | |
| Year | Team | GP | GS | Cmb | Solo | Ast | Sck | TFL | Int | Yds | Avg | Lng | TD | PD | FF | Fum | FR | Yds | TD |
|---|---|---|---|---|---|---|---|---|---|---|---|---|---|---|---|---|---|---|---|
| 2017 | NE | **3** | 0 | **3** | **3** | 0 | **2.0** | **3** | 0 | 0 | 0.0 | 0 | 0 | 0 | 0 | 0 | 0 | 0 | 0 |
| 2018 | NE | **3** | 0 | 1 | 0 | **1** | 0.0 | 0 | 0 | 0 | 0.0 | 0 | 0 | 0 | 0 | 0 | 0 | 0 | 0 |
| 2019 | NE | 1 | 0 | **3** | 2 | **1** | 0.0 | 0 | 0 | 0 | 0.0 | 0 | 0 | **1** | 0 | 0 | 0 | 0 | 0 |
| Career | | 7 | 0 | 7 | 5 | 2 | 2.0 | 3 | 0 | 0 | 0.0 | 0 | 0 | 1 | 0 | 0 | 0 | 0 | 0 |
