= Kinston High School (North Carolina) =

American public school in North Carolina

Location
- 2601 N Queen Street; Kinston, North Carolina 28501; United States
- 35°17′45″N 77°34′01″W

Information
- Type: Public high school secondary school
- Founded: 1970 (56 years ago)
- CEEB code: 342075
- NCES School ID: 370261000585
- Principal: Kellan Bryant
- Teaching staff: 38.34 (FTE)
- Gender: Co-educational
- Enrollment: 706 (2023–2024)
- Student to teacher ratio: 18.41
- Schedule type: Block, 4-period
- Schedule: 7:45 A.M.–2:40 P.M.
- Hours in school day: 7
- Campus type: Rural
- Colors: Forest green, white, and Vegas gold
- Athletics conference: North Carolina High School Athletic Association; Eastern Carolina
- Mascot: Viking
- Nickname: Vikings
- Website: khs.lcpsnc.org

Kinston High School is a four-year public high school located in Kinston, North Carolina, United States. Kinston High was built in 1970 as an integrated high school to serve the city. The International Baccalaureate program started at Kinston High during the 2003–2004 school year.

In fall 2004, Kinston High School was the first school in Lenoir County to start up a program called Advancement Via Individual Determination (AVID). This program began in California and from there it went around the world. Kinston High School graduated the first AVID class of Lenoir County in 2008 with 25 students receiving AVID diplomas.

== History ==
After the loss by fire in 1924 of the Kinston High School located between Vernon Avenue and Lenoir St. at their intersections with East St., a replacement project was initiated. A new site was selected on land previously owned by Jesse W. Grainger at the corner of what was then Independent Street and Park Avenue. Grainger had been a prominent leader/provider for much of Kinston's growth in the late 19th century and early 20th century. He had generously paid for one-half of the cost of Kinston's first major high school destroyed by a fire.

It was decided that the new high school would be named Grainger High School. Boney architects of Wilmington were selected for design and Palmer-Spivey construction company of Charlotte for construction, both firms having recognized experience in the design and construction of institutional buildings in North Carolina. The general contract for the project was $182,340. Sub-contracts for plumbing ($8,400), heating ($19,638) and electrics ($8,839) made a total of $219,217. The final payment was made on January 3, 1926.

Grainger High School served Kinston until 1970 as a segregated school. After that time, Grainger High and Adkin High School were combined as an integrated Kinston High School under one roof until 1979 when faculty and students relocated to the current north Kinston campus, 2601 North Queen Street.

The Grainger High School mascot was the Red Devil. After Grainger became Kinston High School, the mascot was changed to the Viking.

Kinston High School was originally a 10–12 grade school. The 9th grade class was added to the campus during the 1987–1988 school year.

== Athletics ==
The 2007–08 Kinston boys' basketball team won the North Carolina High School Athletic Association (NCHSAA) Class 3A state championship, and was the Vikings' first boys' basketball state title since the 1960s.

In the 2013–2014 season, the Kinston boys' basketball team won their 3rd consecutive NCHSAA Class 2A state championship. The title was the 10th in school history for Kinston/Grainger High School.

== Notable alumni ==
- Reggie Bullock – current NBA player for the Houston Rockets
- Quinton Coples – NFL defensive end
- Lin Dawson – former NFL tight end
- Tony Dawson – former NBA player
- Ed Grady – actor
- Chris Hatcher – MLB pitcher
- Herbert Hill - basketball player
- Brandon Ingram – current NBA Player and 2nd overall pick in the 2016 NBA draft
- Michael Jenkins – professional basketball player
- Cedric Maxwell – former NBA player and 2x NBA champion (1981 & 1984)
- Jaime Presley – actress and model
- Derek Rivers – NFL defensive end and Super Bowl LIII champion with the New England Patriots
- Charles Shackleford – former NBA player
- Jerry Stackhouse – former NBA player and 2x NBA All-Star (2000 & 2001)
- Ron Wooten – former NFL guard
