= Tyree St. Louis =

American football player (born 1997)

No. 73, 65, 68
- Position: Offensive Tackle

Personal information
- Born: August 5, 1997 (age 29); Tampa, Florida, U.S.
- Listed height: 6 ft 5 in (1.96 m)
- Listed weight: 315 lb (143 kg)

Career information
- High school: IMG Academy (Bradenton, Florida)
- College: Miami
- NFL draft: 2019: undrafted

Career history
- New England Patriots (2019)*; Indianapolis Colts (2019)*; Los Angeles Chargers (2019–2021); Birmingham Stallions (2022)
- * Offseason or practice squad member only

Awards and highlights
- USFL champion (2022)

Career NFL statistics
- Games played: 5
- Games started: 2
- Stats at Pro Football Reference

Tyree DeSean St. Louis (born August 5, 1997) is an American former professional football player who was an offensive tackle in the National Football League (NFL). He played college football for the Miami Hurricanes, and signed with the New England Patriots as an undrafted free agent in 2019. He was also a member of the NFL's Indianapolis Colts and Los Angeles Chargers and Birmingham Stallions of the United States Football League (USFL).

== College career ==
St. Louis came out of the IMG Academy as a four-star recruit by both ESPN and Rivals and the ninth-best offensive lineman prospect in Florida while being a top-300 high school prospect in the country. He decided to stay close to home and play his collegiate football at Miami over offers from Florida, Tennessee, and USC. As a freshman in 2015, St. Louis did not redshirt for the Hurricanes but saw most of his actions on special teams throughout the season. As a sophomore, he saw action as a rotational player in the first 4 games of the season then earned the first starts of his career as he got the nod for the final 8 games of the season at right tackle. St. Louis would go on to start the remaining 26 games of his career through his junior and senior season with 13 starts in 2017 coming at right tackle and the rest coming on the left side. He earned Honorable Mention All-ACC honors following the conclusion of the 2018 season as well as an invite to the East West Shrine all star game.

== Professional career ==
St. Louis was originally signed as an undrafted free agent by the New England Patriots. Once final cuts concluded at the end of preseason, St. Louis signed to the Indianapolis Colts practice squad on September 7. A month later St. Louis was subsequently signed by the Los Angeles Chargers on October 18 to their practice squad for the rest of the season.

For the 2020 season, he was named in the initial 53-man roster and made his NFL debut in the opening weekend game against the Cincinnati Bengals filling in at right guard for the injured Trai Turner.

St. Louis signed an exclusive-rights free agent tender with the Chargers on March 18, 2021. He was waived/injured on August 30, 2021 and placed on injured reserve. He was released on September 2.

St. Louis signed with the Birmingham Stallions of the United States Football League on May 9, 2022. The Stallions went on to win the inaguaral championship for the revamped USFL on July 3rd, 2022.

On March 27, 2023, St. Louis retired from professional football.
