= Keionta Davis =

American football player (born 1994)

No. 51, 58
- Position: Defensive end

Personal information
- Born: March 1, 1994 (age 32); Chattanooga, Tennessee, U.S.
- Listed height: 6 ft 4 in (1.93 m)
- Listed weight: 280 lb (127 kg)

Career information
- High school: Red Bank (Red Bank, Tennessee)
- College: Chattanooga
- NFL draft: 2017: undrafted

Career history
- New England Patriots (2017–2019)

Awards and highlights
- Super Bowl champion (LIII)

Career NFL statistics
- Total tackles: 6
- Sacks: 0
- Forced fumbles: 0
- Fumble recoveries: 0
- Stats at Pro Football Reference

Keionta Leron Davis (born March 1, 1994) is an American former professional football player who was a defensive end for the New England Patriots of the National Football League (NFL). He played college football for the Chattanooga Mocs.

== College career ==
Accumulating 10.5 sacks, 44 tackles, 10 pass breakups, and a blocked field goal in his senior season (2016) for the University of Tennessee at Chattanooga Mocs football team, Davis was named Defensive Player of the Year of the Southern Conference by the league's coaches. Davis graduated with a degree in business.

== Professional career ==
After a stellar four-year career at Chattanooga and considered to be one of the top FCS prospects in the country, Davis was originally forecasted to be picked in the mid-rounds of the 2017 NFL draft, however he was diagnosed with a bulging disc at the NFL Combine, causing him to go undrafted.

=== New England Patriots ===
Davis signed as an undrafted free agent with the New England Patriots on August 11, 2017. He was placed on the team's injured reserve on September 2, ending his season.

Davis impressed in his second training camp and preseason with the Patriots, earning him a spot on the team's 53-man roster. In 2018, the Patriots made it back to the Super Bowl and defeated the Los Angeles Rams 13–3 in Super Bowl LIII.

Davis was waived/injured on August 25, 2019. He reverted to injured reserve the next day.

Davis re-signed with the Patriots on a one-year contract on March 17, 2020.

On April 26, 2020, the Patriots waived Davis.
