= Ufomba Kamalu =

American gridiron football player (born 1992)

No. 97, 94
- Position: Defensive end

Personal information
- Born: November 2, 1992 (age 34); Fayetteville, Georgia, U.S.
- Listed height: 6 ft 6 in (1.98 m)
- Listed weight: 295 lb (134 kg)

Career information
- High school: Starr's Mill (Fayetteville)
- College: Miami (FL)
- NFL draft: 2016: undrafted

Career history
- Houston Texans (2016–2017); Arizona Cardinals (2018)*; New England Patriots (2018–2019); Baltimore Ravens (2019); BC Lions (2021)
- * Offseason or practice squad member only

Awards and highlights
- Super Bowl champion (LIII)

Career NFL statistics
- Total tackles: 12
- Sacks: 3
- Stats at Pro Football Reference

Ufomba Kamalu (born November 2, 1992) is a Nigerian-American former professional football defensive end. He played college football at the University of Miami and signed with the Houston Texans as an undrafted free agent in 2016. He won a Super Bowl ring with the 2018 New England Patriots.

== Early life ==
After being born in California, Kamalu spent the first 13 years of his life in Aba, Nigeria with his siblings, while his parents stayed back home. He returned to the United States for high school, but many concepts in America were completely foreign to him. It has been reported that by his father's request he began playing football his freshman year of high school.

== College career ==
Kamalu went to Butler Community College in El Dorado, Kansas for junior college. He then attended college at University of Miami in Florida, playing football, where he totaled 48 tackles (11.5 for a loss of yardage), 8.0 sacks, one forced fumble and fumble recovery, and an interception which he returned for 46 yards over his 3-year collegiate career. Kamalu was voted Miami's defensive player of the year during his senior year in 2015 After 4 years of college with Butler CC and Miami combined, he declared for the 2016 NFL draft where he went undrafted.

== Professional career ==
Pre-draft measurables
Height	Weight	Arm length	Hand span	40-yard dash	10-yard split	20-yard split	20-yard shuttle	Three-cone drill	Vertical jump	Broad jump	Bench press
6 ft 5 1/8 in (1.96 m)	295 lb (134 kg)	35 in (0.89 m)	10 in (0.25 m)	4.88 s	1.65 s	2.79 s	4.58 s	7.32 s	31.5 in (0.80 m)	8 ft 10 in (2.69 m)	26 reps
All values from NFL Combine/Pro Day

=== Houston Texans ===
Kamalu signed with the Houston Texans as an undrafted free agent on May 5, 2016. He was waived by the Texans on September 3, 2016 and was signed to the practice squad the next day. He was promoted to the active roster on November 26, 2016. He made his professional debut in Week 13 in a start against the Green Bay Packers, where he recorded his first career tackle in a 21–13 loss. Kamalu recorded his first career sack on Matt Cassel in a Week 17 loss to the Tennessee Titans.

On September 1, 2018, Kamalu was waived by the Texans.

=== Arizona Cardinals ===
On September 25, 2018, Kamalu was signed to the Arizona Cardinals' practice squad. He was released on October 30, 2018.

=== New England Patriots ===
On November 5, 2018, Kamalu was signed to the New England Patriots' practice squad. He was promoted to the active roster on December 21, 2018. Kamalu appeared in 2 games for the Patriots recording 1 tackle. With Kamalu the Patriots reached Super Bowl LIII and defeated the Los Angeles Rams 13–3.

On August 31, 2019, Kamalu was released during final roster cuts. He was signed onto the Patriots practice squad a day later.

=== Baltimore Ravens ===
On October 24, 2019, Kamalu was signed by the Baltimore Ravens off the Patriots' practice squad. He was waived on November 12 and re-signed to the practice squad. He signed a reserve/future contract with the Ravens on January 13, 2020. He was released by the Ravens on April 8, 2020. The next day Kamalu was arrested on a warrant for domestic violence. The woman showed visible signs of injury. The young lady tried to get justice but Ufomba Kamalu, along with his attorney Benjamin Herbst (of The Herbst Firm in Baltimore) allegedly silenced her. Benjamin Herbst allegedly called the young lady in question to bail Ufomba Kamalu out of jail, but she was afraid and did not want to do so. So attorney Benjamin Herbst found another person to allegedly sign for his bail. The young lady reported Benjamin Herbst to the Maryland Bar. He was suspended by the NFL for the remainder of the 2020 NFL regular season and postseason on December 11, 2020, and reinstated from suspension on February 8, 2021.

=== BC Lions ===
Despite his alleged history with domestic violence, Kamalu managed to signed with the BC Lions of the CFL on December 30, 2020. He played in six games for the Lions during the 2021 season before being placed on the reserve/suspended list on October 21, 2021. He was released on February 14, 2023.
