= Nick Thurman =

American football player (born 1995)

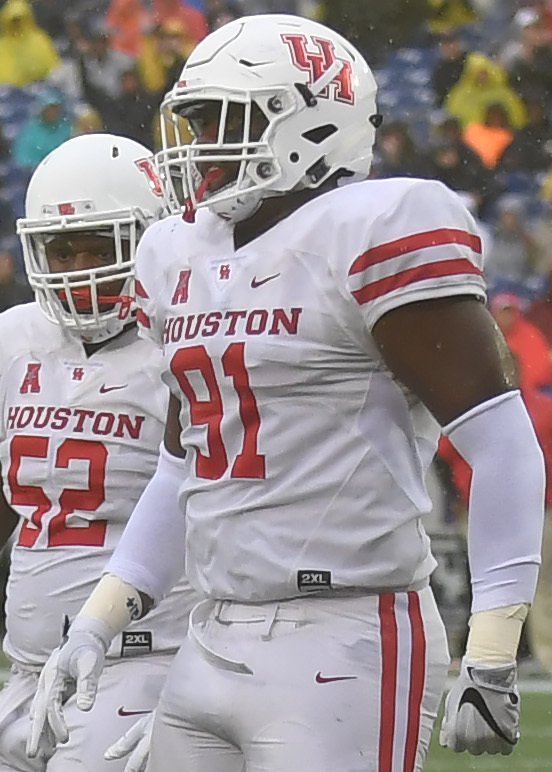
- Thurman with the Houston Cougars in 2016

Profile
- Position: Defensive tackle

Personal information
- Born: June 12, 1995 (age 31); Dallas, Texas, U.S.
- Listed height: 6 ft 4 in (1.93 m)
- Listed weight: 305 lb (138 kg)

Career information
- High school: Lake Highlands (Dallas, Texas)
- College: Houston
- NFL draft: 2018: undrafted

Career history
- Houston Texans (2018)*; Tampa Bay Buccaneers (2019)*; New England Patriots (2019–2021); Atlanta Falcons (2021–2022)*; Jacksonville Jaguars (2022–2023)*; Carolina Panthers (2023–2024)
- * Offseason or practice squad member only

Career NFL statistics as of 2023
- Total tackles: 42
- Stats at Pro Football Reference

Nicholas-Devon L Thurman (born June 12, 1995) is an American professional football defensive tackle. He played college football for Houston.

== Early life ==
Thurman played high school football at Lake Highlands High School. Thurman was a three star recruit coming out of high school and committed to the University of Houston to play football.

== College career ==
Thurman played in 44 games in his career at Houston, recording 92 tackles, 15 tackles-for-loss, and 4.5 sacks. Thurman was named to the 2018 Senior Bowl watch list going into his senior season.

== Professional career ==
Pre-draft measurables
Height	Weight	Arm length	Hand span	40-yard dash	10-yard split	20-yard split	20-yard shuttle	Three-cone drill	Vertical jump	Broad jump	Bench press
6 ft 3 3/4 in (1.92 m)	299 lb (136 kg)	33 7/8 in (0.86 m)	9 1/4 in (0.23 m)	5.17 s	1.73 s	2.91 s	4.76 s	7.51 s	33.0 in (0.84 m)	9 ft 8 in (2.95 m)	22 reps
All values from Pro Day

=== Houston Texans ===
Thurman signed with the Houston Texans as an undrafted free agent on May 14, 2018. He was waived by Houston during final roster cuts on September 1.

=== Tampa Bay Buccaneers ===
Thurman signed with the Tampa Bay Buccaneers on April 4, 2019. He was waived by the Buccaneers on April 29.

=== New England Patriots ===
On May 2, 2019, Thurman was signed by the New England Patriots. He was waived during final roster cuts on August 31, and was re-signed to the team's practice squad the next day.

After spending the entire 2019 season on the practice squad, Thurman signed a reserve/futures contract with the Patriots on January 6, 2020. He was waived during final roster cuts on September 5, and re-signed to the practice squad the next day. Thurman was elevated to the active roster on September 19, September 26, October 17, and October 24 for the team's Weeks 2, 3, 6, and 7 games against the Seattle Seahawks, Las Vegas Raiders, Denver Broncos, and San Francisco 49ers; he reverted to the practice squad after each game. Thurman made his NFL debut against the Seahawks. He was signed to the active roster on October 31. Thurman was waived by New England on November 14, and re-signed to the practice squad four days later. He was elevated to the active roster again on December 28 for the Week 16 game against the Buffalo Bills, and reverted to the practice squad again following the game. He signed a reserve/future contract on January 4, 2021.

On August 31, 2021, Thurman was waived by the Patriots.

=== Atlanta Falcons ===
On October 26, 2021, Thurman was signed to the Atlanta Falcons practice squad. He signed a reserve/future contract with the Falcons on January 10, 2022. On August 30, Thurman was waived by the Falcons.

=== Jacksonville Jaguars ===
On September 27, 2022, Thurman was signed to the Jacksonville Jaguars' practice squad. He signed a reserve/future contract with Jacksonville on January 23, 2023. Thurman was released by the Jaguars on July 21.

=== Carolina Panthers ===
On July 31, 2023, Thurman signed with the Carolina Panthers.

On January 8, 2024, the Panthers signed Thurman to a one-year contract extension. He was released on November 6.
