= D'Angelo Ross =

American football player (born 1996)

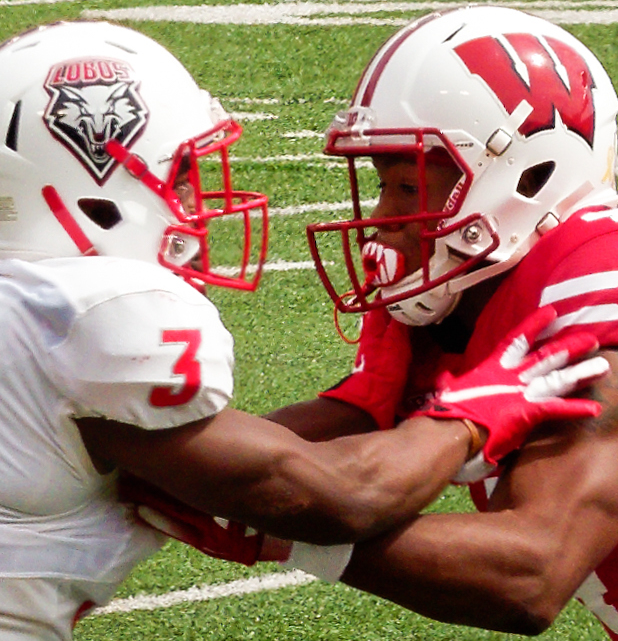
- Ross (left) with the New Mexico Lobos in 2018

Profile
- Position: Cornerback

Personal information
- Born: October 29, 1996 (age 30); La Puente, California, U.S.
- Listed height: 5 ft 9 in (1.75 m)
- Listed weight: 190 lb (86 kg)

Career information
- High school: South Hills (West Covina, California)
- College: Fullerton (2015–2016); New Mexico (2017–2018)
- NFL draft: 2019: undrafted

Career history
- New England Patriots (2019–2021); Miami Dolphins (2022)*; Houston Texans (2022–2025); Cleveland Browns (2025–2026)
- * Offseason or practice squad member only

Career NFL statistics as of 2025
- Total tackles: 33
- Pass deflections: 4
- Stats at Pro Football Reference

D'Angelo Julius Skyler Ross (born October 29, 1996) is an American professional football cornerback. He played college football for the New Mexico Lobos, and signed as an undrafted free agent to the New England Patriots after the 2019 NFL draft.

== College career ==
=== Fullerton College ===
Ross attended his first two years of college at Fullerton before transferring to New Mexico. In 25 career games at Fullerton, Ross had 8 interceptions and was named first-team All-SCFA National Division during his sophomore season.

=== New Mexico ===
Ross played the final two seasons of his college career at the University of New Mexico, appearing in 24 games. In his junior campaign, Ross had 28 total tackles and 11 pass deflections. In his senior season, he improved to 57 total tackles with 6 pass deflections, 1 interception and 1 forced fumble. Ross was not invited to the NFL Scouting Combine, but posted an impressive 4.32 second 40 yard dash at New Mexico's pro day.

== Professional career ==
Pre-draft measurables
Height	Weight	Arm length	Hand span	Wingspan	40-yard dash	10-yard split	20-yard split	20-yard shuttle	Three-cone drill	Vertical jump	Broad jump	Bench press
5 ft 8 in (1.73 m)	182 lb (83 kg)	29 1/8 in (0.74 m)	9 in (0.23 m)	5 ft 7 7/8 in (1.72 m)	4.34 s	1.49 s	2.59 s	4.40 s	7.10 s	39.0 in (0.99 m)	10 ft 0 in (3.05 m)	15 reps
All values from Pro Day

=== New England Patriots ===
On May 2, 2019, Ross was signed by the New England Patriots as an undrafted free agent. He was placed on injured reserve on August 12. On September 5, 2020, Ross was released by the team and signed to the practice squad the following day. On January 2, 2021, he was elevated to the active roster for the team's Week 17 game against the New York Jets, and reverted to the practice squad after. He signed a reserve/future contract on January 4.

On September 1, Ross was released by the Patriots and re-signed to the practice squad.

=== Miami Dolphins ===
On January 25, 2022, Ross signed a reserve/future contract with the Miami Dolphins. He was waived/injured on August 29 and placed on injured reserve. He was released on September 1.

In November 2022, Ross was selected by the St. Louis BattleHawks in the 2023 XFL draft.

=== Houston Texans ===
On November 22, 2022, Ross was signed to the Houston Texans practice squad. He signed a reserve/future contract on January 10, 2023.

On August 29, 2023, Ross was released by the Texans as part of final roster cuts and re-signed to the practice squad on September 21. He was promoted to the active roster on October 18, waived by the Texans on October 23 and re-signed to the practice squad the following day. He was promoted back to the active roster on November 4.

On July 18, 2024, Ross was placed on the active/physically unable to perform (PUP) list. He was released on August 27 and re-signed to the practice squad the following day. Ross was promoted to the active roster on September 18. He was waived on November 9 and re-signed to the practice squad two days later.

On January 11, 2025, in a Wild Card game win against the Los Angeles Chargers, Ross returned a blocked PAT for a defensive two point conversion, the first time such a play has occurred in the playoffs since the rule was implemented in 2015.

On August 26, 2025, Ross was released by the Texans as part of final roster cuts and re-signed to the practice squad the following week.

=== Cleveland Browns ===
On November 19, 2025, Ross was signed by the Cleveland Browns off the Texans practice squad.

On March 17, 2026, Ross re-signed with the Browns. Ross was released by Cleveland on August 30 as a part of final roster cuts; he was re-signed to the team's practice squad the following day. He was elevated from the practice squad for the team's Week 1 matchup against the Jacksonville Jaguars, but was released on September 15. On September 23, Cleveland re–signed Ross to their practice squad. On September 28, Ross was released.

== Personal life ==
Ross was born to Daniel and Wendy Ross and is one of five children. Ross graduated with a degree in business administration in December 2018 from the University of New Mexico.
