= Derek Rivers =

American football player (born 1994)

Profile
- Position: Defensive end

Personal information
- Born: May 9, 1994 (age 32); Augusta, Maine, U.S.
- Listed height: 6 ft 5 in (1.96 m)
- Listed weight: 250 lb (113 kg)

Career information
- High school: Kinston (Kinston, North Carolina)
- College: Youngstown State (2013–2016)
- NFL draft: 2017: 3rd round, 83rd overall pick

Career history
- New England Patriots (2017–2020); Los Angeles Rams (2020); Houston Texans (2021–2023); Indianapolis Colts (2023–2024)*
- * Offseason or practice squad member only

Awards and highlights
- Super Bowl champion (LIII)

Career NFL statistics
- Total tackles: 16
- Sacks: 3.5
- Stats at Pro Football Reference

Derek Rivers (born May 9, 1994) is an American professional football defensive end. He played college football for the Youngstown State Penguins. He has been a member of the New England Patriots, Los Angeles Rams, Houston Texans and Indianapolis Colts.

== Early life ==
Born in Augusta, Maine, Rivers and his family moved to North Carolina when he was five months old. Rivers later attended Kinston High School in Kinston. After high school, he attended Fork Union Military Academy for a year.

== College career ==
Rivers played at Youngstown State from 2013 to 2016. During his career he had a school record 41 career sacks, including 14 as a senior. He accumulated 56.5 tackles for loss, 47 quarterback hurries and 119 solo tackles in his college career at Youngstown State. As a senior, Rivers led one of the top statistically rated defenses in the Football Championship Subdivision (FCS) to the National Championship where they would lose to James Madison University 24–14. Rivers was a three time 1st Team All-Missouri Valley Football Conference performer as well as a two time FCS All-American. Rivers finished his career #5 all-time in FCS history in career sacks.

== Professional career ==
Pre-draft measurables
Height	Weight	Arm length	Hand span	40-yard dash	10-yard split	20-yard split	20-yard shuttle	Three-cone drill	Vertical jump	Broad jump	Bench press
6 ft 3 5/8 in (1.92 m)	248 lb (112 kg)	32 3/4 in (0.83 m)	9 3/8 in (0.24 m)	4.61 s	1.60 s	2.66 s	4.40 s	6.94 s	35 in (0.89 m)	10 ft 3 in (3.12 m)	30 reps
All values from NFL Combine

=== New England Patriots ===
Rivers was selected by the New England Patriots in the third round (83rd overall) of the 2017 NFL draft. During training camp, he suffered a torn ACL and was ruled out for the season. He was officially placed on injured reserve on September 2, 2017.

Rivers made his NFL debut in Week 3 of the 2018 season, against the Detroit Lions. In Week 17, he recorded his first career sack when he took down rookie quarterback Sam Darnold in a win against the New York Jets. He played in his first career postseason game on January 13, 2019, in a win against the Los Angeles Chargers. Rivers helped the Patriots reach Super Bowl LIII, although he was inactive for it. The team defeated the Los Angeles Rams 13–3. He played in 6 regular-season games that season, recording 2 solo tackles and 1 sack.

Rivers suffered a knee injury in Week 2 of the 2019 preseason, and was ruled out for the rest of the season. He was placed on injured reserve on August 31, 2019.

Rivers made the 53-man roster coming out of 2020's shortened preseason. He was active in Week 1, against the Miami Dolphins, where he recorded his first sack since 2018 on quarterback Ryan Fitzpatrick. He was placed on the reserve/COVID-19 list by the Patriots on October 17, 2020, but was activated on October 21. On November 21, Rivers was released by the Patriots to make room on the roster.

As a Patriot, he played in 14 regular-season games through nearly 4 seasons (being injured for 2 of those seasons), making six tackles with 2.5 sacks. Rivers also played in one postseason game.

=== Los Angeles Rams ===
On November 23, 2020, Rivers was claimed off waivers by the Los Angeles Rams. As a Ram, he played in 2 regular-season games, as well as both postseason games, their postseason being cut short with a loss of 32–18 to the Green Bay Packers.

=== Houston Texans ===
On March 23, 2021, Rivers signed with the Houston Texans. On August 31, he was released, but re-signed to the practice squad on September 1. He was promoted to the active roster on November 24. On December 9, the Texans signed Rivers to a two-year, $1 million deal. The last game he played in for that season was on December 19 against the Jacksonville Jaguars, where he recorded his first sack since Week 1 of 2020 on quarterback Trevor Lawrence. This was his only sack of the season, having played in only 5 consecutive games that season, beginning on November 21.

On August 30, 2022, Rivers was placed on injured reserve with a torn biceps tendon. He was out for the entire season.

Rivers re-signed with the Texans on March 16, 2023. On August 30, he was both released from the active roster and signed to the practice squad. In a flurry of moves over the course of three weeks, Rivers was shifted between being promoted to the active roster, being released, and being re-signed to the practice squad, starting with his promotion to the active roster on September 21 and ending as a member of the practice squad on October 7. He was released on November 1.

=== Indianapolis Colts ===
On December 7, 2023, the Indianapolis Colts signed Rivers to their practice squad. He was not signed to a reserve/future contract after the season and thus became a free agent upon the expiration of his practice squad contract. He was re-signed on August 14, 2024. Rivers was released on August 25. He was re-signed to the practice squad on September 24. Rivers was released on November 12 and re-signed to the practice squad one week later. He was released on November 25.
