= 2017 New England Patriots season =

58th season in franchise history, fifth Super Bowl loss

- Owner: Robert Kraft
- Head coach: Bill Belichick
- Offensive coordinator: Josh McDaniels
- Defensive coordinator: Matt Patricia
- Home stadium: Gillette Stadium

Results
- Record: 13–3
- Division place: 1st AFC East
- Playoffs: Won Divisional Playoffs (vs. Titans) 35–14; Won AFC Championship (vs. Jaguars) 24–20; Lost Super Bowl LII (vs. Eagles) 33–41
- All-Pros: 3: QB Tom Brady (1st team); TE Rob Gronkowski (1st team); ST Matthew Slater (2nd team)
- Pro Bowlers: 4: Selected but did not participate due to participation in Super Bowl LII: QB Tom Brady; FB James Develin; TE Rob Gronkowski; ST Matthew Slater
- Team MVP: Tom Brady
- Team ROY: Deatrich Wise Jr.

Uniform
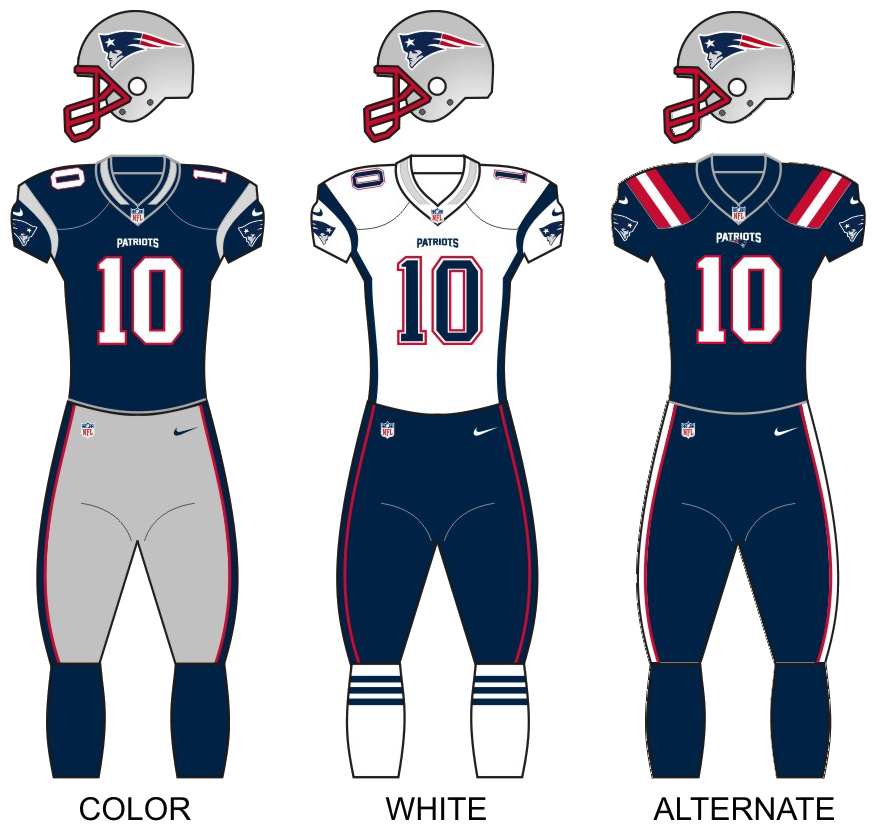

The 2017 season was the New England Patriots' 48th in the National Football League (NFL), their 58th overall and their 18th under head coach Bill Belichick.

The Patriots entered the season as the defending champions of Super Bowl LI. They failed to match their 14–2 record from last season with their Week 14 loss to the Miami Dolphins. Despite that, in Week 15, the Patriots secured their 9th consecutive AFC East title, their 15th of the last 17 seasons, with their victory over the Pittsburgh Steelers. With their win over the Buffalo Bills in week 16, the Patriots obtained their 8th consecutive 12-or-more win season stretching all the way from 2010, an NFL record. Their Week 17 victory over the New York Jets clinched their top seed in the AFC for the second straight year, thus giving the Patriots home-field advantage throughout the entire AFC playoffs for the second year in a row.

The Patriots defeated the Tennessee Titans in the divisional round 35–14, and the Jacksonville Jaguars in the AFC Championship Game 24–20, claiming their second consecutive AFC title. This was their seventh consecutive AFC Championship appearance, adding onto their record from the previous year. The win also made Tom Brady the oldest quarterback (40 years, 163 days) to win a playoff game, surpassing Brett Favre for the record. It was also the second time they advanced to the Super Bowl two consecutive seasons, the first being 2004. They faced the Philadelphia Eagles in a rematch of Super Bowl XXXIX. This also made the Patriots the only team in NFL history to appear in ten Super Bowls, and gave the Patriots a chance to repeat as Super Bowl Champions for the second time in franchise history, and for the first time since 2004. In addition, they had the chance to tie the Pittsburgh Steelers for the record of most Super Bowl wins by a team in NFL history with 6. However, due to a late strip-sack of Brady by Brandon Graham and a failed Hail Mary pass, the Patriots lost Super Bowl LII to the Eagles by a score of 41–33, ending New England's chance at a sixth Super Bowl title and resulting in their first Super Bowl loss since 2011. The loss prevented the Patriots from repeating their three-in-four Super Bowl run that they managed from 2001 to 2004. Also with the loss, the Patriots tied the NFL record for most Super Bowl losses with five, and made them the fifth defending Super Bowl champion to lose the next year's game, after the 1978 Dallas Cowboys, the 1983 Washington Redskins, the 1997 Green Bay Packers, and the 2014 Seattle Seahawks. They would later be joined by the 2020 and 2024 Kansas City Chiefs.

This was the last time where the Patriots lost a Super Bowl until 2025 where they lost in Super Bow LX. This was also the last time that Brady lost a Super Bowl as his final two Super Bowls he would win later on were LIII and LV.

== Coaching changes ==
=== Departures ===
February 20: Long time Patriots coach, Brian Daboll, was named as the offensive coordinator for the University of Alabama football team after serving as the Patriots tight ends coach for three years.

=== Promotions ===
February 27: After serving as a Patriots coaching assistant for 2 years, Nick Caley was named as the Patriots tight ends coach, replacing former Patriots tight ends coach Brian Daboll for the job.

== Roster changes ==
=== Free agents ===
==== Unrestricted ====
| Position | Player | 2017 Team | Date signed | Contract |
|---|---|---|---|---|
| TE | Martellus Bennett | Green Bay Packers | March 10, 2017 | three years, $21 million |
| RB | LeGarrette Blount | Philadelphia Eagles | May 17, 2017 | one year, $2.8 million |
| RB | Brandon Bolden | New England Patriots | April 5, 2017 | one year, $775,000 |
| DT | Alan Branch | New England Patriots | March 9, 2017 | two years, $12 million |
| FB | James Develin | New England Patriots | March 6, 2017 | two years, $2.85 million |
| WR | Michael Floyd | Minnesota Vikings | May 10, 2017 | one year, $1.5 million |
| FS | Duron Harmon | New England Patriots | March 9, 2017 | four years, $17 million |
| MLB | Dont'a Hightower | New England Patriots | March 15, 2017 | four years, $43.5 million |
| DE | Chris Long | Philadelphia Eagles | March 28, 2017 | two years, $4.8 million |
| OLB | Barkevious Mingo | Indianapolis Colts | March 9, 2017 | one year, $2.5 million |
| CB | Logan Ryan | Tennessee Titans | March 10, 2017 | three years, $30 million |
| TE | Greg Scruggs | | | |
| DE/OLB | Jabaal Sheard | Indianapolis Colts | March 10, 2017 | three years, $25.5 million |

==== Restricted ====
| Position | Player | 2017 Team | Date signed | Contract |
|---|---|---|---|---|
| CB | Malcolm Butler | New England Patriots | April 18, 2017 | assigned tender (first-round) on March 7, 2017 ($3.91 million) |
| OT | Cameron Fleming | New England Patriots | April 10, 2017 | assigned tender (original-round) on March 7, 2017 ($1.797 million) |
| TE | Michael Williams | New England Patriots | March 9, 2017 | one year, $540,000 |

==== Exclusive-Rights ====
| Position | Player | 2017 Team | Date signed | Contract |
|---|---|---|---|---|
| CB | Justin Coleman | New England Patriots | March 16, 2017 | assigned tender on March 7, one year, $615,000 |
| SS | Brandon King | New England Patriots | April 11, 2017 | assigned tender on March 8, one year, $615,000 |
| TE | Matt Lengel | New England Patriots | April 18, 2017 | assigned tender on March 7, one year, $540,000 |

=== Signings ===
| Position | Player | Previous team | Date signed | Contract |
|---|---|---|---|---|
| TE | Rob Housler | Chicago Bears | January 19, 2017 | future contract |
| CB | Stephon Gilmore | Buffalo Bills | March 10, 2017 | five years, $65 million |
| DT | Lawrence Guy | Baltimore Ravens | March 11, 2017 | four years, $13.4 million |
| RB | Rex Burkhead | Cincinnati Bengals | March 14, 2017 | one year, $3.15 million |
| RB | Mike Gillislee | Buffalo Bills | April 24, 2017 | two years, $6.4 million |
| WR | Devin Street | Indianapolis Colts | May 2, 2017 | claimed off waivers |
| C | James Ferentz | Denver Broncos | May 18, 2017 | one year, $615,000 |
| WR | DeAndrew White | New England Patriots | May 21, 2017 | one year, $540,000 |
| WR | Andrew Hawkins | Cleveland Browns | May 24, 2017 | one year, $980,000 |
| LB | David Harris | New York Jets | June 21, 2017 | two years, $5 million |
| DE | Caleb Kidder | Minnesota Vikings | July 26, 2017 | one year, $465,000 |
| WR | Tony Washington | Jacksonville Jaguars | July 27, 2017 | one year, $540,000 |
| WR | K. J. Maye | Tennessee Titans | July 30, 2017 | one year, $465,000 |
| DE | Michael Bart | Arizona Cardinals | August 28, 2017 | one year, $465,000 |
| DE | Nick Usher | Seattle Seahawks | August 28, 2017 | one year, $465,000 |
| RB | Brandon Bolden | New England Patriots | Re-signed September 4, 2017 | one year, $775,000 |
| QB | Brian Hoyer | San Francisco 49ers | November 1, 2017 | three years, $4,441,470 |
| DE | Ricky Jean Francois | Green Bay Packers | November 7, 2017 | one year, $990,000 |
| TE | Martellus Bennett | Green Bay Packers | November 9, 2017 | two years, $14 million |
| DE | Eric Lee | Buffalo Bills | November 21, 2017 | two years, $1,020,000 |
| LB | Nicholas Grigsby | Baltimore Ravens | November 28, 2017 | two years, $1,170,000 |
| OG | Jason King | Baltimore Ravens | November 28, 2017 | one year, $465,000 |
| LB | Jonathan Freeny | Jacksonville Jaguars | Re-signed December 6, 2017 | one year, $775,000 |
| WR | Kenny Britt | Cleveland Browns | December 12, 2017 | two years, $2.4 million |
| DE | Ricky Jean Francois | New England Patriots | Re-signed December 13, 2017 | one year, $900,000 |
| OLB | James Harrison | Pittsburgh Steelers | December 26, 2017 | one year, $1,000,000 |
| WR | Bernard Reedy | New England Patriots | Re-signed January 17, 2017 | one year, $225,000 |

| Indicates that the player was a free agent at the end of his respective team's 2016 season. |

=== Departures ===
| Position | Player | Notes |
|---|---|---|
| OT | Sebastian Vollmer | Released March 3, 2017 |
| RB | Tyler Gaffney | Waived March 20, 2017 |
| OG | Tre' Jackson | Waived April 18, 2017 |
| TE | Michael Williams | Released May 12, 2017 |
| TE | Rob Housler | Released May 17, 2017 |
| OG | Chris Barker | Released May 18, 2017 |
| WR | Devin Street | Released May 24, 2017 |
| DE | Corey Vereen | Waived June 5, 2017 |
| WR | DeAndrew White | Released June 22, 2017 |
| OG | Chase Farris | Released July 20, 2017 |
| WR | Andrew Hawkins | Retired July 25, 2017 |
| OLB/DE | Rob Ninkovich | Retired July 30, 2017 |
| SS | Dwayne Thomas | Released August 11, 2017 |
| DE | Kony Ealy | Released August 26, 2017 |
| DE | Caleb Kidder | Released August 27, 2017 |
| TE | Matt Lengel | Released August 27, 2017 |
| OLB | Christian Kuntz | Released August 29, 2017 |
| FB | Glenn Gronkowski | Released September 1, 2017 |
| TE | Sam Cotton | Released September 1, 2017 |
| OT | Max Rich | Released September 1, 2017 |
| OG | Jason King | Released September 1, 2017 |
| DE | Michael Bart | Released September 1, 2017 |
| DT | Josh Augusta | Released September 1, 2017 |
| FS | Jason Thompson | Released September 1, 2017 |
| OLB | Jonathan Freeny | Released September 1, 2017 |
| WR | Tony Washington | Released September 2, 2017 |
| WR | K. J. Maye | Released September 2, 2017 |
| OLB | Trevor Bates | Released September 2, 2017 |
| RB | D. J. Foster | Released September 2, 2017 |
| RB | LeShun Daniels | Released September 2, 2017 |
| CB | D. J. Killings | Released September 2, 2017 |
| OT | Andrew Jelks | Released September 2, 2017 |
| CB | Kenny Moore II | Released September 2, 2017 |
| OG | Jamil Douglas | Released September 2, 2017 |
| SS | Damarius Travis | Released September 2, 2017 |
| WR | Cody Hollister | Released September 2, 2017 |
| FS | David Jones | Released September 2, 2017 |
| DE | Nick Usher | Released September 2, 2017 |
| WR | Austin Carr | Released September 2, 2017 |
| TE | James O'Shaughnessy | Released September 2, 2017 |
| DE | Geneo Grissom | Released September 2, 2017 |
| RB | Brandon Bolden | Released September 2, 2017 |
| OG | Ted Karras | Released September 2, 2017 |
| C | James Ferentz | Released September 2, 2017 |
| MLB | Brooks Ellis | Released September 2, 2017 |
| DT | Woodrow Hamilton | Released September 2, 2017 |
| DT | Darius Kilgo | Released September 2, 2017 |
| CB | William Likely | Released September 2, 2017 |
| WR | Devin Lucien | Released September 2, 2017 |
| OT | Conor McDermott | Released September 2, 2017 |
| DE | Geneo Grissom | Waived November 9, 2017 |
| DE | Cassius Marsh | Released November 21, 2017 |
| DE | Ricky Jean-Francois | Released December 2, 2017 |
| OG | Jason King | Released December 2, 2017 |
| WR | Bernard Reedy | Released December 13, 2017 |
| OLB | Jonathan Freeny | Released December 13, 2017 |
| OLB | Trevor Reilly | Waived December 26, 2017 |

=== Trades ===
- March 8: The Patriots obtained tight end Dwayne Allen and a sixth-round selection and sent a fourth-round selection to the Indianapolis Colts.
- March 10: The Patriots were involved in a trade in which they sent their second-round selection to the Carolina Panthers for defensive end Kony Ealy and a third-round selection.
- March 10: The Patriots were involved in a trade in which they sent their first-round selection and a third-round selection to the New Orleans Saints for wide receiver Brandin Cooks and a fourth-round selection.
- April 29: The Patriots traded a fifth-round selection to the Kansas City Chiefs for tight end James O'Shaughnessy and a sixth-round selection.
- August 29: The Patriots traded a 2018 seventh-round selection to the Cincinnati Bengals for linebacker Marquis Flowers.
- September 1: The Patriots traded cornerback Justin Coleman to the Seattle Seahawks for a 2018 seventh-round draft selection.
- September 2: The Patriots traded a 2019 sixth-round selection to the Detroit Lions for cornerback Johnson Bademosi.
- September 2: The Patriots traded quarterback Jacoby Brissett to the Indianapolis Colts for wide receiver Phillip Dorsett.
- September 2: The Patriots traded their 2018 fifth and seventh-round picks to the Seahawks for defensive end Cassius Marsh.
- October 30: The Patriots traded quarterback Jimmy Garoppolo to the San Francisco 49ers for a 2018 second-round selection.

=== Draft ===
2017 New England Patriots draft
| Round | Pick | Player | Position | College | Notes |
| 3 | 83 | Derek Rivers | OLB | Youngstown St | |
| 3 | 85 | Antonio Garcia | OT | Troy | |
| 4 | 131 | Deatrich Wise Jr. | DE | Arkansas | |
| 6 | 211 | Conor McDermott | OT | UCLA | |
Made roster † Pro Football Hall of Fame * Made at least one Pro Bowl during career

Notes

- The fourth-round selection that the Patriots obtained from the trade with the New Orleans Saints would have been No. 118 overall; however, it was forfeited as part of the punishment for the Deflategate scandal.
- The Patriots were awarded an additional fifth-round compensatory selection – No. 183 overall.
- The Patriots gave up a fifth-round selection – No. 163 overall – to the Buffalo Bills when they signed restricted free agent Mike Gillislee to an offer sheet.
- As a result of their trades, the Patriots did not use any of their assigned selections, and drafted just four players—the lowest number in franchise history.

2017 New England Patriots Draft Trades
| Draft pick year | Round | Overall | Team | Received |
|---|---|---|---|---|
| 2017 | 1 | 32 | to New Orleans Saints | Received wide receiver Brandin Cooks and the Saints' fourth-round selection (No. 118 overall). |
| 2017 | 3 | 103 | to New Orleans Saints | Received wide receiver Brandin Cooks and the Saints' fourth-round selection (No. 118 overall). |
| 2017 | 2 | 64 | to Carolina Panthers | Received Carolina's third-round selection (No. 72 overall) and defensive end Kony Ealy |
| 2017 | 3 | 72 | to Tennessee Titans | Received Tennessee's third-round selection (No. 83 overall) and Tennessee's fourth-round selection (No. 124 overall) |
| 2017 | 6 | 200 | to Tennessee Titans | Received Tennessee's third-round selection (No. 83 overall) and Tennessee's fourth-round selection (No. 124 overall) |
| 2016 | 5 | 147 | to Seattle Seahawks | Received Seattle's 2017 fourth-round selection (No. 131 overall) and Seattle's 2016 seventh-round selection (No. 225 overall) |
| 2016 | 7 | 243 | to Seattle Seahawks | Received Seattle's 2017 fourth-round selection (No. 131 overall) and Seattle's 2016 seventh-round selection (No. 225 overall) |
| 2017 | 4 | 137 | to Indianapolis Colts | Received Indianapolis's sixth-round selection (No. 200) and tight end Dwayne Allen. |
| Linebacker Jamie Collins | | | to Cleveland Browns | Received Cleveland's third-round compensatory selection (No. 103 overall) |
| 2017 | 5 | 175 | to Cleveland Browns | Received linebacker Barkevious Mingo |
| Tight end A.J. Derby | | | to Denver Broncos | Received Denver's fifth-round selection (No. 163 overall) |
| 2017 | 5 | 183 | to Kansas City Chiefs | Received tight end James O'Shaughnessy and Kansas City's sixth-round compensatory selection (No. 216 overall) |
| 2017 | 3 | 96 | to Detroit Lions | Received Detroit's third-round selection (No. 85 overall) |
| 2017 | 4 | 124 | to Detroit Lions | Received Detroit's third-round selection (No. 85 overall) |
| 2017 | 6 | 215 | to Detroit Lions | Received linebacker Kyle Van Noy and the Lions' seventh-round selection (No. 239 overall) |
| 2017 | 7 | 250 | to Detroit Lions | Received tight end Michael Williams. |
| 2017 | 6 | 216 | to Dallas Cowboys | Received Dallas's sixth-round selection (No. 211) |
| 2017 | 7 | 239 | to Dallas Cowboys | Received Dallas's sixth-round selection (No. 211) |

=== Undrafted free agents ===
2017 New England Patriots Undrafted Free Agents
| Player | Position | College | Date signed |
|---|---|---|---|
| Josh Augusta | DT | Missouri | May 5, 2017 |
| Adam Butler | DT | Vanderbilt | May 5, 2017 |
| Austin Carr | WR | Northwestern | May 5, 2017 |
| Cole Croston | OT | Iowa | May 5, 2017 |
| LeShun Daniels | RB | Iowa | May 5, 2017 |
| Brooks Ellis | LB | Arkansas | May 5, 2017 |
| Cody Hollister | WR | Arkansas | May 5, 2017 |
| Jacob Hollister | TE | Wyoming | May 5, 2017 |
| Andrew Jelks | OT | Vanderbilt | May 5, 2017 |
| David Jones | FS | Richmond | May 5, 2017 |
| D.J. Killings | CB | UCF | May 5, 2017 |
| Jason King | OG | Purdue | May 5, 2017 |
| Harvey Langi | LB | BYU | May 5, 2017 |
| Kenny Moore II | CB | Valdosta St. | May 5, 2017 |
| Max Rich | OT | Harvard | May 5, 2017 |
| Dwayne Thomas | SS | LSU | May 5, 2017 |
| Jason Thompson | FS | Utah | May 5, 2017 |
| Damarius Travis | SS | Minnesota | May 5, 2017 |
| Corey Vereen | DE | Tennessee | May 5, 2017 |
| Sam Cotton | TE | Nebraska | May 18, 2017 |
| William Likely | CB | Maryland | June 5, 2017 |
| Keionta Davis | DE | Chattanooga | August 11, 2017 |
| Mikey Bart | DE | North Carolina | August 28, 2017 |
| Christian Kuntz | LB | Duquesne | August 28, 2017 |
| Dennis McCarthy | QB | Boston College | August 28, 2017 |
| Nick Usher | DE | UTEP | August 28, 2017 |

| Made regular season roster |

=== Suspensions ===
- Tight end Rob Gronkowski was suspended for one game (Week 14) for intentionally falling on cornerback Tre'Davious White while White was on the ground during Week 13 against the Buffalo Bills.

=== Injuries ===
- September 2: Wide receiver Julian Edelman was placed on injured reserve after suffering a torn ACL in the week 3 preseason matchup against the Detroit Lions. It was confirmed that he would be out for the entire season.
- September 2: Cornerback Cyrus Jones was placed on injured reserve after sustaining a torn ACL and meniscus during the week 4 preseason matchup against the New York Giants. He would be out for the entire season.
- September 2: Defensive end Derek Rivers tore his ACL and sprained his LCL during a joint-practice with the Houston Texans in August.
- September 4: Outside linebacker Shea McClellin was placed on injured reserve after being out since early preseason. He will be ineligible to return until week 8.
- September 22: Defensive tackle Vincent Valentine was placed on injured reserve due to a knee injury that kept him out of practice throughout the season.
- November 7: Linebacker Dont'a Hightower suffered an injury on his right shoulder pectoral muscle during the second half of the game against the Atlanta Falcons.
- November 27: Safety/Special teamer Nate Ebner suffered a knee injury during a fake punt against the Miami Dolphins.
- November 27: Tight end Martellus Bennett was placed on injured reserve after having both a shoulder and a hamstring injury.
- December 13: Offensive tackle Marcus Cannon who was out since October 29 due to an ankle injury, was placed on injured reserve.
- January 17: Cornerback Jonathan Jones suffered an ankle injury in the Patriots' divisional-round game against the Tennessee Titans and was placed on injured reserved.

== Staff ==
2017 New England Patriots staff
| Front office: Chairman/CEO – Robert Kraft; President – Jonathan Kraft; General manager – Bill Belichick; Director of player personnel – Nick Caserio; Director of college scouting – Monti Ossenfort; Director of pro personnel – Dave Ziegler; Assistant director of college scouting – Brian Smith; Director of scouting administration – Nancy Meier; Football research director – Ernie Adams; Director of football/head coach administration – Berj Najarian; Head coaches: Head coach – Bill Belichick; Offensive coaches: Offensive coordinator/quarterbacks – Josh McDaniels; Assistant quarterbacks – Jerry Schuplinski; Running backs – Ivan Fears; Wide receivers – Chad O'Shea; Tight ends – Nick Caley; Offensive line – Dante Scarnecchia; Coaching assistant – Cole Popovich | Defensive coaches: Defensive coordinator – Matt Patricia; Defensive line – Brendan Daly; Linebackers – Brian Flores; Cornerbacks – Josh Boyer; Safeties – Steve Belichick; Coaching assistant – Brian Belichick; Coaching assistant – DeMarcus Covington; Coaching assistant – Mike Pellegrino; Special teams coaches: Special teams – Joe Judge; Assistant special teams – Bubba Ventrone; Strength and conditioning: Head strength and conditioning – Moses Cabrera; Assistant strength and conditioning – James Hardy |

== Rosters ==
=== Opening training camp ===
As of the Patriots' first training camp practice at Gillette Stadium on July 27, they had the NFL maximum of 90 players signed.

New England Patriots 2017 opening training camp roster
| Quarterbacks: 12 Tom Brady; 7 Jacoby Brissett; 10 Jimmy Garoppolo; Running backs: 38 Brandon Bolden; 34 Rex Burkhead; 39 LeShun Daniels; 46 James Develin FB; 27 D. J. Foster; 35 Mike Gillislee; 47 Glenn Gronkowski FB; 33 Dion Lewis; 28 James White; Wide receivers: 80 Danny Amendola PR; 84 Austin Carr; 14 Brandin Cooks; 11 Julian Edelman; 15 Chris Hogan; 81 Cody Hollister; 13 Devin Lucien; 19 Malcolm Mitchell; 18 Matthew Slater; 17 Tony Washington; Tight ends: 83 Dwayne Allen; 85 Sam Cotton; 87 Rob Gronkowski; 48 Jacob Hollister; 82 Matt Lengel; 88 James O'Shaughnessy | Offensive linemen: 60 David Andrews C; 61 Marcus Cannon T; 70 Cole Croston T; 65 Jamil Douglas G; 59 James Ferentz C; 71 Cameron Fleming T; 63 Antonio Garcia T; 75 Ted Karras G; 74 Jason King G; 69 Shaq Mason G; 67 Conor McDermott T; 72 Max Rich T; 77 Nate Solder T; 62 Joe Thuney G; 68 LaAdrian Waddle T; Defensive linemen: 72 Josh Augusta DT; 90 Malcom Brown DT; 70 Adam Butler DT; 94 Kony Ealy DE; 98 Trey Flowers DE; 92 Geneo Grissom DE; 93 Lawrence Guy DT; 74 Woodrow Hamilton DT; 95 Derek Rivers DE; 96 Darius Kilgo DT; 64 Caleb Kidder DE; 99 Vincent Valentine DT; 91 Deatrich Wise Jr. DE | Linebackers: 44 Trevor Bates OLB; 47 Brook Ellis MLB; 55 Jonathan Freeny OLB; 45 David Harris OLB; 48 Harvey Langi OLB; 58 Shea McClellin OLB; 50 Rob Ninkovich OLB; 52 Elandon Roberts MLB; 53 Kyle Van Noy OLB; Defensive backs: 21 Malcolm Butler CB; 23 Patrick Chung SS; 22 Justin Coleman CB; 43 Nate Ebner FS; 24 Stephon Gilmore CB; 30 Duron Harmon FS; 41 Cyrus Jones CB/KR; 34 David Jones FS; 31 Jonathan Jones CB; 29 D. J. Killings CB; 36 Brandon King SS; 33 William Likely CB; 32 Devin McCourty FS; 42 Kenny Moore II CB; 37 Jordan Richards SS; 25 Eric Rowe CB; 27 Dwayne Thomas SS; 36 Jason Thompson FS; 35 Damarius Travis SS ^{UR}; Special teams: 6 Ryan Allen P; 3 Stephen Gostkowski K | Reserve lists: 97 Alan Branch DT (active/PUP); 49 Joe Cardona LS (Military); 66 Chase Farris G (Waived/NF-Inj.); 54 Dont'a Hightower MLB (active/PUP); 76 Andrew Jelks T (active/NF-Inj.); 59 Corey Vereen DE (Waived/Injured); Rookies in italics 90 active, 3 inactive |

=== Week 1 ===
New England Patriots 2017 Week 1 roster
| Quarterbacks: 12 Tom Brady; 10 Jimmy Garoppolo; Running backs: 34 Rex Burkhead; 38 Brandon Bolden; 46 James Develin FB; 35 Mike Gillislee; 33 Dion Lewis; 28 James White; Wide receivers: 80 Danny Amendola PR; 14 Brandin Cooks; 13 Phillip Dorsett; 15 Chris Hogan; 18 Matthew Slater; Tight ends: 83 Dwayne Allen; 87 Rob Gronkowski; 47 Jacob Hollister | Offensive linemen: 60 David Andrews C; 61 Marcus Cannon T; 74 Cole Croston T; 71 Cameron Fleming T; 75 Ted Karras G; 69 Shaq Mason G; 77 Nate Solder T; 62 Joe Thuney G; 68 LaAdrian Waddle T; Defensive linemen: 97 Alan Branch DT; 90 Malcom Brown DT; 70 Adam Butler DT; 98 Trey Flowers DE; 93 Lawrence Guy DT; 55 Cassius Marsh DT; 99 Vincent Valentine DT; 91 Deatrich Wise Jr. DE | Linebackers: 59 Marquis Flowers OLB; 45 David Harris OLB; 54 Dont'a Hightower OLB; 48 Harvey Langi OLB; 52 Elandon Roberts MLB; 53 Kyle Van Noy OLB; Defensive backs: 29 Johnson Bademosi CB; 21 Malcolm Butler CB; 23 Patrick Chung SS; 43 Nate Ebner FS; 24 Stephon Gilmore CB; 30 Duron Harmon FS; 31 Jonathan Jones CB; 36 Brandon King SS; 32 Devin McCourty FS; 37 Jordan Richards SS; 25 Eric Rowe CB; Special teams: 6 Ryan Allen P; 49 Joe Cardona LS; 3 Stephen Gostkowski K | Reserve lists: 72 Josh Augusta DT (IR); 51 Keionta Davis DE (NF-Inj.) ^{UR}; 11 Julian Edelman WR (IR); 66 Chase Farris G (NF-Inj.); 63 Antonio Garcia T (Nf-Ill) ^{R}; 76 Andrew Jelks T (NF-Inj.) ^{UR}; 41 Cyrus Jones CB (IR); 64 Caleb Kidder DE (IR) ^{UR}; -- D. J. Killings CB (IR) ^{UR}; 82 Matt Lengel TE (IR); 58 Shea McClellin OLB (IR); 19 Malcolm Mitchell WR(IR); 95 Derek Rivers DE (IR) ^{R}; Practice squad: 16 Demarcus Ayers WR; -- Willie Beavers G; 94 Angelo Blackson DE; -- James Ferentz C; 27 D. J. Foster RB; 92 Geneo Grissom DE; 81 Cody Hollister WR; -- David Jones FS; -- Damarius Travis SS; -- Jomal Wiltz CB; Rookies in italics 53 active, 11 inactive, 10 practice squad |

=== Final ===
2017 New England Patriots roster
| Quarterbacks (QB): 12 Tom Brady; 2 Brian Hoyer; Running backs (RB): 38 Brandon Bolden; 34 Rex Burkhead; 46 James Develin FB; 35 Mike Gillislee; 33 Dion Lewis KR; 28 James White; Wide receivers (WR): 80 Danny Amendola PR; 85 Kenny Britt; 14 Brandin Cooks; 13 Phillip Dorsett; 15 Chris Hogan; 17 Bernard Reedy; 18 Matthew Slater; Tight ends (TE): 83 Dwayne Allen; 87 Rob Gronkowski; 47 Jacob Hollister | Offensive linemen (OL): 60 David Andrews C; 74 Cole Croston G; 71 Cameron Fleming T; 75 Ted Karras C/G; 69 Shaq Mason G; 77 Nate Solder T; 62 Joe Thuney G; 68 LaAdrian Waddle T; Defensive linemen (DL): 97 Alan Branch DT; 90 Malcom Brown DT; 70 Adam Butler DT; 98 Trey Flowers DE; 96 Geneo Grissom DE; 93 Lawrence Guy DE/DT; 94 Ricky Jean Francois DT; 55 Eric Lee DE; 91 Deatrich Wise DE | Linebackers (LB): 59 Marquis Flowers OLB; 50 Nicholas Grigsby MLB; 45 David Harris OLB; 92 James Harrison OLB; 52 Elandon Roberts; 53 Kyle Van Noy OLB; Defensive backs (DB): 29 Johnson Bademosi CB; 21 Malcolm Butler CB; 23 Patrick Chung SS; 24 Stephon Gilmore CB; 30 Duron Harmon SS; 36 Brandon King FS; 32 Devin McCourty FS; 37 Jordan Richards SS; 25 Eric Rowe CB; Special teams (ST): 6 Ryan Allen P; 49 Joe Cardona LS; 3 Stephen Gostkowski K | Practice squad: 66 James Ferentz C; 81 Cody Hollister WR; 26 David Jones FS; 65 Jason King G; 27 Ryan Lewis CB; 84 Riley McCarron WR; 51 Trevor Reilly OLB; 39 Damarius Travis SS; 82 Will Tye TE; 22 Jomal Wiltz CB; Reserve: 88 Martellus Bennett TE (IR); 61 Marcus Cannon T (IR); 42 Keionta Davis DE (NF-Inj.); 43 Nate Ebner FS (IR); 11 Julian Edelman WR (IR); -- Chase Farris G (NF-Ill.); 63 Antonio Garcia T (NF-Ill.); 54 Dont'a Hightower MLB (IR); 76 Andrew Jelks T (NF-Inj.); 41 Cyrus Jones CB (IR); 31 Jonathan Jones CB (IR); 64 Caleb Kidder DE (IR); 48 Harvey Langi OLB (NF-Inj.); 58 Shea McClellin OLB (IR); 19 Malcolm Mitchell WR (IR); 95 Derek Rivers DE (IR); 99 Vincent Valentine DT (IR); Rookies in italics 53 active, 17 reserve, 10 practice squad |

== Preseason ==
| Week | Date | Opponent | Result | Record | Game site | NFL.com recap |
|---|---|---|---|---|---|---|
| 1 | August 10 | Jacksonville Jaguars | L 24–31 | 0–1 | Gillette Stadium | Recap |
| 2 | August 19 | at Houston Texans | L 23–27 | 0–2 | NRG Stadium | Recap |
| 3 | August 25 | at Detroit Lions | W 30–28 | 1–2 | Ford Field | Recap |
| 4 | August 31 | New York Giants | L 38–40 | 1–3 | Gillette Stadium | Recap |

== Regular season ==
=== Schedule ===
| Week | Date | Opponent | Result | Record | Game site | NFL.com recap |
|---|---|---|---|---|---|---|
| 1 | September 7 | Kansas City Chiefs | **L** 27–42 | 0–1 | Gillette Stadium | Recap |
| 2 | September 17 | at New Orleans Saints | **W** 36–20 | 1–1 | Mercedes-Benz Superdome | Recap |
| 3 | September 24 | Houston Texans | **W** 36–33 | 2–1 | Gillette Stadium | Recap |
| 4 | October 1 | Carolina Panthers | **L** 30–33 | 2–2 | Gillette Stadium | Recap |
| 5 | October 5 | at Tampa Bay Buccaneers | **W** 19–14 | 3–2 | Raymond James Stadium | Recap |
| 6 | October 15 | at **New York Jets** | **W** 24–17 | 4–2 | MetLife Stadium | Recap |
| 7 | October 22 | Atlanta Falcons | **W** 23–7 | 5–2 | Gillette Stadium | Recap |
| 8 | October 29 | Los Angeles Chargers | **W** 21–13 | 6–2 | Gillette Stadium | Recap |
| 9 | Bye | | | | | |
| 10 | November 12 | at Denver Broncos | **W** 41–16 | 7–2 | Sports Authority Field at Mile High | Recap |
| 11 | November 19 | at Oakland Raiders | **W** 33–8 | 8–2 | Estadio Azteca (Mexico City) | Recap |
| 12 | November 26 | **Miami Dolphins** | **W** 35–17 | 9–2 | Gillette Stadium | Recap |
| 13 | December 3 | at **Buffalo Bills** | **W** 23–3 | 10–2 | New Era Field | Recap |
| 14 | December 11 | at **Miami Dolphins** | **L** 20–27 | 10–3 | Hard Rock Stadium | Recap |
| 15 | December 17 | at Pittsburgh Steelers | **W** 27–24 | 11–3 | Heinz Field | Recap |
| 16 | December 24 | **Buffalo Bills** | **W** 37–16 | 12–3 | Gillette Stadium | Recap |
| 17 | December 31 | **New York Jets** | **W** 26–6 | 13–3 | Gillette Stadium | Recap |

Note: Intra-division opponents are in bold text.

=== Game summaries ===
==== Week 1: vs. Kansas City Chiefs ====
NFL Kickoff Game

Week One: Kansas City Chiefs at New England Patriots – Game summary

| Quarter | 1 | 2 | 3 | 4 | Total |
|---|---|---|---|---|---|
| **Chiefs** | 7 | 7 | 7 | 21 | **42** |
| Patriots | 7 | 10 | 10 | 0 | **27** |

at Gillette Stadium, Foxborough, Massachusetts

- Date: September 7
- Game time: 8:30 p.m. EDT
- Game weather: 63 °F (17 °C), clear and warm
- Game attendance: 65,878
- Referee: Bill Vinovich
- TV announcers (NBC): Al Michaels, Cris Collinsworth and Michele Tafoya
- Recap, Gamebook

Game information

**First quarter**

- NE – Mike Gillislee 2-yard run (Stephen Gostkowski kick), 2:52. Patriots 7–0. **Drive: 9 plays, 73 yards, 2:52.**
- KC – Demetrius Harris 7-yard pass from Alex Smith (Cairo Santos kick), 3:03. Tied 7–7. **Drive: 12 plays, 60 yards, 6:22.**

**Second quarter**

- NE – Stephen Gostkowski 25-yard field goal, 14.56. Patriots 10–7. **Drive: 8 plays, 67 yards, 3:07.**
- NE – Mike Gillislee 2-yard run (Stephen Gostkowski kick), 7:27. Patriots 17–7. **Drive: 11 plays, 82 yards, 5:50.**
- KC – Kareem Hunt 3-yard pass from Alex Smith (Cairo Santos kick), 0:13. Patriots 17–14. **Drive: 12 plays, 92 yards, 2:34.**

**Third quarter**

- KC – Tyreek Hill 75-yard pass from Alex Smith (Cairo Santos kick), 9:19. Chiefs 21–17. **Drive: 1 play, 75 yards, 0:09.**
- NE – Mike Gillislee 1-yard run (Stephen Gostkowski kick), 5:01. Patriots 24–21. **Drive: 3 plays, 54 yards, 1:21.**
- NE – Stephen Gostkowski 32-yard field goal, 0:09. Patriots 27–21. **Drive: 7 plays, 58 yards, 2:41.**

**Fourth quarter**

- KC – Kareem Hunt 78-yard pass from Alex Smith (Cairo Santos kick), 14:07. Chiefs 28–27. **Drive: 3 plays, 90 yards, 1:02.**
- KC – Kareem Hunt 4-yard run (Cairo Santos kick), 5:14. Chiefs 35–27. **Drive: 7 plays, 60 yards, 3:41.**
- KC – Charcandrick West 21-yard run (Cairo Santos kick), 4:00. Chiefs 42–27. **Drive: 2 plays, 79 yards, 0:15.**

**Top passers**

- KC – Alex Smith – 28/35, 368 yards, 4 TD
- NE – Tom Brady – 16/36, 267 yards

**Top rushers**

- KC – Kareem Hunt – 17 rushes, 148 yards, TD
- NE – Mike Gillislee – 15 rushes, 45 yards, 3 TD

**Top receivers**

- KC – Tyreek Hill – 7 receptions, 133 yards, TD
- NE – Danny Amendola – 6 receptions, 100 yards

The Patriots started their season at home on Thursday, September 7 as the defending Super Bowl champion. They would strike first in the first quarter when Mike Gillislee ran for a 2-yard touchdown for a 7–0 lead. The Chiefs however tied it later on in the quarter at 7–7 when Alex Smith found Demetrius Harris on a 7-yard pass. In the second quarter, the Pats moved ahead by double digits as Stephen Gostkowski kicked a 25-yard field goal followed up by Gillislee running for another 2-yard touchdown to make the score 10–7 and increased it to 17–7. The Chiefs came within 3 before halftime when Smith found Kareem Hunt on a 3-yard pass for a 17–14 game.

In the third quarter, the Chiefs took the lead as Smith found Tyreek Hill on a 75-yard pass to make it 21–17. Though the Pats moved back into the lead when Gillislee ran for a 1-yard touchdown to make it 24–21. They then closed out the quarter with a 27–21 lead when Gostowski kicked a 32-yard field goal. In the fourth quarter, it was all Chiefs. It all started with Smith finding Hunt again this time on a 78-yard pass to retake the lead 28–27. This was followed by Hunt's 4-yard run for a touchdown to make it 35–27. Finally, they closed the scoring of the game with Charcandrick West's 21-yard run for a touchdown for the final score of 42–27.

This game was the Chiefs' first win in Foxborough since 1990. Additionally, the Patriots defense allowed 537 total yards which is the most yardage ever given up by a Bill Belichick team during a single game as the Patriots began 0–1 for the first time since 2014. It was also Brady's first regular season loss at home to a team from another AFC division since Week 9 of the 2006 season.

This was the first Patriots game to air on new NBC affiliate WBTS-TV in Boston.

==== Week 2: at New Orleans Saints ====
Week Two: New England Patriots at New Orleans Saints – Game summary

| Quarter | 1 | 2 | 3 | 4 | Total |
|---|---|---|---|---|---|
| **Patriots** | 20 | 10 | 3 | 3 | **36** |
| Saints | 3 | 10 | 0 | 7 | **20** |

at Mercedes-Benz Superdome, New Orleans, Louisiana

- Date: September 17
- Game time: 1:00 p.m. EDT/12:00 p.m. CDT
- Game weather: Played indoors (dome stadium)
- Game attendance: 73,168
- Referee: Craig Wrolstad
- TV announcers (CBS): Jim Nantz, Tony Romo and Tracy Wolfson
- Recap, Gamebook

Game information

**First quarter**

- NE – Rex Burkhead 19-yard pass from Tom Brady (kick failed, hit left upright), 10:31. Patriots 6–0. **Drive: 10 plays, 75 yards, 4:29.**
- NO – Wil Lutz 46-yard field goal, 7:43. Patriots 6–3. **Drive: 7 plays, 34 yards, 2:53.**
- NE – Rob Gronkowski 53-yard pass from Tom Brady (Stephen Gostkowski kick), 5:42. Patriots 13–3. **Drive: 5 plays, 75 yards, 2:09.**
- NE – Chris Hogan 13-yard pass from Tom Brady (Stephen Gostkowski kick), 0:16. Patriots 20–3. **Drive: 9 plays, 67 yards, 3:53.**

**Second quarter**

- NO – Brandon Coleman 5-yard pass from Drew Brees (Wil Lutz kick), 11:52. Patriots 20–10. **Drive: 9 plays, 80 yards, 3:24.**
- NO – Wil Lutz 35-yard field goal, 8:23. Patriots 20–13. **Drive: 7 plays, 45 yards, 2:13.**
- NE – Mike Gillislee 2-yard run (Stephen Gostkowski kick), 4:52. Patriots 27–13. **Drive: 6 plays, 75 yards, 3:31.**
- NE – Stephen Gostkowski 28-yard field goal, 0:02. Patriots 30–13. **Drive: 9 plays, 65 yards, 2:23.**

**Third quarter**

- NE – Stephen Gostkowski 24-yard field goal, 0:44. Patriots 33–13. **Drive: 9 plays, 55 yards, 4:15.**

**Fourth quarter**

- NE – Stephen Gostkowski 27-yard field goal, 8:54. Patriots 36–13. **Drive: 9 plays, 80 yards, 5:30.**
- NO – Coby Fleener 4-yard pass from Drew Brees (Wil Lutz kick), 5:04. Patriots 36–20. **Drive: 10 plays, 75 yards, 3:45.**

**Top passers**

- NE – Tom Brady – 30/39, 447 yards, 3 TD
- NO – Drew Brees – 27/45, 356 yards, 2 TD

**Top rushers**

- NE – Mike Gillislee – 18 rushes, 69 yards, TD
- NO – Mark Ingram II – 8 rushes, 52 yards

**Top receivers**

- NE – Rob Gronkowski – 6 receptions, 116 yards, TD
- NO – Michael Thomas – 5 receptions, 89 yards

The Patriots rebounded from their opening week loss by establishing an early insurmountable lead against the New Orleans Saints in their week 2 matchup for their first visit to Mercedes-Benz Superdome since the Saints' Super Bowl winning 2009 season. Brandin Cooks returned to the Bayou while the controversy for the Saints was around backs Adrian Peterson and Mark Ingram II competing for touches. (Alvin Kamara, who would go on to win 2017 NFL Offensive Rookie of the Year, was not yet getting significant playing time in week 2.) Peterson would later be shipped to the Cardinals in an ironic turn of events for Chris Johnson. Tom Brady completed three first-quarter touchdown passes to Rex Burkhead, Rob Gronkowski, and Chris Hogan. The three touchdowns marked a personal record for Brady, who had never in his career had so many scores in the first quarter of any game. Mike Gillislee added a running touchdown in the second quarter, and the Patriots played a conservative second half to seal the 36–20 victory. This would be the only home loss the Saints would have this season. Grownkowski injured his groin in the third quarter, causing him to leave the game.

==== Week 3: vs. Houston Texans ====
Week Three: Houston Texans at New England Patriots – Game summary

| Quarter | 1 | 2 | 3 | 4 | Total |
|---|---|---|---|---|---|
| Texans | 10 | 10 | 7 | 6 | **33** |
| **Patriots** | 7 | 14 | 7 | 8 | **36** |

at Gillette Stadium, Foxborough, Massachusetts

- Date: September 24
- Game time: 1:00 p.m. EDT
- Game weather: 84 °F (29 °C), Sunny
- Game attendance: 65,878
- Referee: John Parry
- TV announcers (CBS): Ian Eagle, Dan Fouts and Evan Washburn
- Recap, Gamebook

Game information

**First quarter**

- NE – Rob Gronkowski 5-yard pass from Tom Brady (Stephen Gostkowski kick), 10:33. Patriots 7–0. **Drive: 7 plays, 51 yards, 2:50.**
- HOU – Kaʻimi Fairbairn 39-yard field goal, 7:22. Patriots 7–3. **Drive: 6 plays, 57 yards, 3:11.**
- HOU – Bruce Ellington 29-yard pass from Deshaun Watson (Kaʻimi Fairbairn kick), 1:51. Texans 10–7. **Drive: 2 plays, 44 yards, 0:40.**

**Second quarter**

- NE – Chris Hogan 7-yard pass from Tom Brady (Stephen Gostkowski kick), 12:25. Patriots 14–10. **Drive: 1 plays, 12 yards, 0:32.**
- HOU – Kaʻimi Fairbairn 40-yard field goal, 7:01. Patriots 14–13. **Drive: 10 plays, 55 yards, 5:24.**
- HOU – Jadeveon Clowney 22-yard fumble return (Kaʻimi Fairbairn kick), 6:15. Texans 20–14. **Drive: 2 plays, 3 yards, 0:46.**
- NE – Chris Hogan 47-yard pass from Tom Brady (Stephen Gostkowski kick), 3:58. Patriots 21–20. **Drive: 6 plays, 75 yards, 2:17.**

**Third quarter**

- NE – Brandin Cooks 42-yard pass from Tom Brady (Stephen Gostkowski kick), 12:45. Patriots 28–20. **Drive: 5 plays, 81 yards, 2:15.**
- HOU – Ryan Griffin 12-yard pass from Deshaun Watson (Kaʻimi Fairbairn kick), 7:12. Patriots 28–27. **Drive: 10 plays, 70 yards, 5:33.**

**Fourth quarter**

- HOU – Kaʻimi Fairbairn 31-yard field goal, 12:13. Texans 30–28. **Drive: 12 plays, 67 yards, 4:29.**
- HOU – Kaʻimi Fairbairn 36-yard field goal, 2:24. Texans 33–28. **Drive: 7 plays, 49 yards, 3:31.**
- NE – Brandin Cooks 25-yard pass from Tom Brady (Tom Brady-Brandin Cooks pass), 0:23. Patriots 36–33. **Drive: 8 plays, 75 yards, 2:01.**

**Top passers**

- HOU – Deshaun Watson – 22/33, 301 yards, 2 TD, 2 INT
- NE – Tom Brady – 25/35, 378 yards, 5 TD

**Top rushers**

- HOU – Lamar Miller – 14 rushes, 56 yards
- NE – Mike Gillislee – 12 rushes, 31 yards

**Top receivers**

- HOU – DeAndre Hopkins – 7 receptions, 76 yards
- NE – Brandin Cooks – 5 receptions, 131 yards, 2 TD

The week 3 matchup vs. the Texans proved to be a greater challenge for the Patriots than the Saints had been in week 2. The Patriots scored first on a 7-play drive ending with a Tom Brady 5-yard throw to Rob Gronkowski, who was playing with a groin injury that took him out of the previous week's game. The game would progress through seven lead changes, as Texans rookie quarterback Deshaun Watson would go drive-for-drive against Brady. Watson threw two touchdowns, one of which to his tight end Ryan Griffin, who attended college in New England at UConn. Two field goals late in the game would give the Texans their final lead at 33–28. With less than 2:25 remaining in the game, Brady led the Patriots on a frantic 8-play 71-yard drive that culminated in a 25-yard reception by Brandin Cooks to give the Patriots the 36–33 win.

==== Week 4: vs. Carolina Panthers ====
Week Four: Carolina Panthers at New England Patriots – Game summary

| Quarter | 1 | 2 | 3 | 4 | Total |
|---|---|---|---|---|---|
| **Panthers** | 3 | 14 | 6 | 10 | **33** |
| Patriots | 3 | 13 | 0 | 14 | **30** |

at Gillette Stadium, Foxborough, Massachusetts

- Date: October 1
- Game time: 1:00 p.m. EDT
- Game weather: 61 °F (16 °C), sunny
- Game attendance: 65,878
- Referee: Jerome Boger
- TV announcers (Fox): Joe Buck, Troy Aikman and Erin Andrews
- Recap, Gamebook

Game information

**First quarter**

- NE – Stephen Gostkowski 41-yard field goal, 11:47. Patriots 3–0. **Drive: 8 plays, 52 yards, 3:13.**
- CAR – Graham Gano 32-yard field goal, 7:41. Tied 3–3. **Drive: 8 plays, 61 yards, 4:06.**

**Second quarter**

- NE – Chris Hogan 2-yard pass from Tom Brady (Stephen Gostkowski kick), 12:39. Patriots 10–3. **Drive: 11 plays, 74 yards, 5:32.**
- CAR – Fozzy Whittaker 28-yard pass from Cam Newton (Graham Gano kick), 9:41. Tied 10–10. **Drive: 6 plays, 75 yards, 2:58.**
- NE – Stephen Gostkowski 35-yard field goal, 4:30. Patriots 13–10. **Drive: 12 plays, 57 yards, 5:11.**
- CAR – Devin Funchess 10-yard pass from Cam Newton (Graham Gano kick), 0:26. Panthers 17–13. **Drive: 9 plays, 84 yards, 4:04.**
- NE – Stephen Gostkowski 58-yard field goal, 0:00. Panthers 17–16. **Drive: 4 plays, 35 yards, 0:26.**

**Third quarter**

- CAR – Devin Funchess 16-yard pass from Cam Newton (kick failed, wide left), 2:47. Panthers 23–16. **Drive: 11 plays, 68 yards, 6:30.**

**Fourth quarter**

- CAR – Cam Newton 7-yard run (Graham Gano kick), 12:58. Panthers 30–16. **Drive: 6 plays, 64 yards, 2:50.**
- NE – Dion Lewis 8-yard run (Stephen Gostkowski kick), 8:46. Panthers 30–23. **Drive: 9 plays, 75 yards, 4:12.**
- NE – Danny Amendola 1-yard pass from Tom Brady (Stephen Gostkowski kick), 3:09. Tied 30–30. **Drive: 10 plays, 49 yards, 4:18.**
- CAR – Graham Gano 48-yard field goal, 0:00. Panthers 33–30. **Drive: 10 plays, 46 yards, 3:09.**

**Top passers**

- CAR – Cam Newton – 22/29, 316 yards, 3 TD, INT
- NE – Tom Brady – 32/45, 307 yards, 2 TD

**Top rushers**

- CAR – Jonathan Stewart – 14 rushes, 68 yards
- NE – Mike Gillislee – 12 rushes, 49 yards

**Top receivers**

- CAR – Kelvin Benjamin – 4 receptions, 104 yards
- NE – Rob Gronkowski – 4 receptions, 80 yards

The Patriots' third game at home this season was their second loss of the season. Tom Brady's attempted comeback in the fourth quarter was not enough to beat Cam Newton and the Panthers as Carolina upset New England 33–30 with a last second 48-yard field goal courtesy of Graham Gano. At the end of Week 4, the Patriots' defense was ranked last in the entire NFL. In this rematch of Super Bowl XXXVIII, this was the second consecutive time, after the 2013 season, that the Pats lost a heartbreaker to Cam Newton. This was the last time the Patriots lost a home game until Week 14 of 2019.

With the loss, the Pats fell to 2–2. Brady's record against the Panthers overall also fell to 2–3.

==== Week 5: at Tampa Bay Buccaneers ====
Week Five: New England Patriots at Tampa Bay Buccaneers – Game summary

| Quarter | 1 | 2 | 3 | 4 | Total |
|---|---|---|---|---|---|
| **Patriots** | 3 | 10 | 3 | 3 | **19** |
| Buccaneers | 0 | 7 | 0 | 7 | **14** |

at Raymond James Stadium, Tampa, Florida

- Date: October 5
- Game time: 8:25 p.m. EDT
- Game weather: 76 °F (24 °C), clear
- Game attendance: 64,476
- Referee: Carl Cheffers
- TV announcers (CBS/NFLN/Amazon Video): Jim Nantz, Tony Romo and Tracy Wolfson
- Recap, Gamebook

Game information

**First quarter**

- NE – Stephen Gostkowski 27-yard field goal, 1:21. Patriots 3–0. **Drive: 13 plays, 89 yards, 7:10.**

**Second quarter**

- TB – Doug Martin 1-yard run (Nick Folk kick), 8:26. Buccanneers 7–3. **Drive: 11 plays, 68 yards, 5:12.**
- NE – Chris Hogan 5-yard pass from Tom Brady (Stephen Gostkowski kick), 3:42. Patriots 10–7. **Drive: 9 plays, 75 yards, 4:44.**
- NE – Stephen Gostkowski 23-yard field goal, 9:55. Patriots 13–7. **Drive: 7 plays, 22 yards, 1:33.**

**Third quarter**

- NE – Stephen Gostkowski 45-yard field goal, 9:55. Patriots 16–7. **Drive: 8 plays, 67 yards, 3:25.**

**Fourth quarter**

- TB – Cameron Brate 18-yard pass from Jameis Winston (Nick Folk kick), 2:09. Patriots 16–14. **Drive: 9 plays, 74 yards, 2:17.**
- NE – Stephen Gostkowski 48-yard field goal, 1:10. Patriots 19–14. **Drive: 4 plays, 7 yards, 0:59.**

**Top passers**

- NE – Tom Brady – 30/40, 303 yards, TD, INT
- TB – Jameis Winston – 26/46, 334 yards, TD

**Top rushers**

- NE – Dion Lewis – 7 rushes, 53 yards
- TB – Doug Martin – 13 rushes, 74 yards, TD

**Top receivers**

- NE – Brandin Cooks – 5 receptions, 85 yards
- TB – DeSean Jackson – 5 receptions, 106 yards

For the first time since 2009, the Patriots wore an all-white ensemble for this game, against the Buccaneers. For the first time this season, the Patriots were held to just a single touchdown on offense. Buccaneers place kicker Nick Folk missed all three field goal attempts in this game, which proved fatal to any chance they had at a comeback. After the conclusion of Week 5, the Patriots claimed a share in a three-way tie for the division lead. Star tight-end Rob Gronkowski did not play in the game, after being listed on the injury report for suffering from a thigh injury suffered at practice the previous day.

==== Week 6: at New York Jets ====
Week Six: New England Patriots at New York Jets – Game summary

| Quarter | 1 | 2 | 3 | 4 | Total |
|---|---|---|---|---|---|
| **Patriots** | 0 | 14 | 7 | 3 | **24** |
| Jets | 7 | 7 | 0 | 3 | **17** |

at MetLife Stadium, East Rutherford, New Jersey

- Date: October 15
- Game time: 1:00 p.m. EDT
- Game weather: 73 °F (23 °C), cloudy
- Game attendance: 77,562
- Referee: Tony Corrente
- TV announcers (CBS): Ian Eagle, Dan Fouts and Evan Washburn
- Recap, Gamebook

Game information

**First quarter**

- NYJ – Austin Seferian-Jenkins 1-yard pass from Josh McCown (Chandler Catanzaro kick), 9:08. Jets 7–0. **Drive: 13 plays, 88 yards, 5:52.**

**Second quarter**

- NYJ – Jeremy Kerley 31-yard pass from Josh McCown (Chandler Catanzaro kick), 12:18. Jets 14–0. **Drive: 7 plays, 78 yards, 3:33.**
- NE – Dion Lewis 1-yard run (Stephen Gostkowski kick), 5:19. Jets 14–7. **Drive: 9 plays, 93 yards, 4:24.**
- NE – Rob Gronkowski 2-yard pass from Tom Brady (Stephen Gostkowski kick), 0:09. Tied 14–14. **Drive: 6 plays, 63 yards, 0:26.**

**Third quarter**

- NE – Rob Gronkowski 33-yard pass from Tom Brady (Stephen Gostkowski kick), 11:22. Patriots 21–14. **Drive: 8 plays, 75 yards, 3:38.**

**Fourth quarter**

- NE – Stephen Gostkowski 28-yard field goal, 14:10. Patriots 24–14. **Drive: 11 plays, 63 yards, 5:31.**
- NYJ – Chandler Catanzaro 28-yard field goal, 3:40. Patriots 24–17. **Drive: 6 plays, 55 yards, 2:52.**

**Top passers**

- NE – Tom Brady – 20/38, 257 yards, 2 TD, INT
- NYJ – Josh McCown – 31/47, 354 yards, 2 TD, 2 INT

**Top rushers**

- NE – Dion Lewis – 11 rushes, 52 yards, TD
- NYJ – Matt Forte – 9 rushes, 22 yards

**Top receivers**

- NE – Brandin Cooks – 6 receptions, 93 yards
- NYJ – Jermaine Kearse – 4 receptions, 79 yards

Another interesting chapter was added to the Patriots-Jets rivalry at MetLife. With this victory over the Jets, quarterback Tom Brady earned his 187th regular season win. Brady surpassed Brett Favre and Peyton Manning as the NFL's sole all-time leader in regular season wins. While missing two key components of their defensive secondary, the Patriots were able to overcome a two touchdown deficit in the first half and were able to hold on to secure the victory on a final drive surge from the Jets. Star tight end Rob Gronkowski made his return to the lineup, and contributed two touchdowns as well as several other key catches in the victory. This game also marked the first time since Week 1 that Brady did not throw for 300 yards in addition to the Pats third win in a row against the Jets since 2016.

During this game, in the 4th quarter, a controversial play caused a Jets touchdown to be reversed by official review when it was found that Jets tight end Austin Seferian-Jenkins juggled the ball after being hit, resulting in a fumble, and didn't regain control until he was out of bounds which, by rule, is enforced as a turnover and a touchback.

==== Week 7: vs. Atlanta Falcons ====
Week Seven: Atlanta Falcons at New England Patriots – Game summary

| Quarter | 1 | 2 | 3 | 4 | Total |
|---|---|---|---|---|---|
| Falcons | 0 | 0 | 0 | 7 | **7** |
| **Patriots** | 0 | 17 | 3 | 3 | **23** |

at Gillette Stadium, Foxborough, Massachusetts

- Date: October 22
- Game time: 8:30 p.m. EDT
- Game weather: 56 °F (13 °C), cloudy, fog developing in the 2nd quarter
- Game attendance: 65,878
- Referee: Gene Steratore
- TV announcers (NBC): Al Michaels, Cris Collinsworth and Michele Tafoya
- Recap, Gamebook

Game information

**First quarter**

- No scoring plays.

**Second quarter**

- NE – Brandin Cooks 11-yard pass from Tom Brady (Stephen Gostkowski kick), 12:26. Patriots 7–0. **Drive: 7 plays, 74 yards, 3:39.**
- NE – Stephen Gostkowski 29-yard field goal, 4:42. Patriots 10–0. **Drive: 14 plays, 64 yard, 6:37.**
- NE – James White 2-yard pass from Tom Brady (Stephen Gostkowski kick), 0:21. Patriots 17–0. **Drive: 7 plays, 53 yards, 1:34.**

**Third quarter**

- NE – Stephen Gostkowski 21-yard field goal, 4:12. Patriots 20–0. **Drive: 13 plays, 71 yards,6:23.**

**Fourth quarter**

- NE – Stephen Gostkowski 38-yard field goal, 9:15. Patriots 23–0. **Drive: 10 plays, 74 yards, 5:17.**
- ATL – Julio Jones 1-yard pass from Matt Ryan (Matt Bryant kick), 4:09. Patriots 23–7. **Drive: 11 plays, 88 yards, 5:06.**

**Top passers**

- ATL – Matt Ryan – 23/33, 233 yards, TD
- NE – Tom Brady – 21/29, 249 yards, 2 TD

**Top rushers**

- ATL – Devonta Freeman – 12 rushes, 72 yards
- NE – Dion Lewis – 13 rushes, 76 yards

**Top receivers**

- ATL – Julio Jones – 9 receptions, 99 yards, TD
- NE – Chris Hogan – 4 receptions, 71 yards

For the first time since Week 3 of last season, the Patriots wore their all-blue Color Rush uniforms, for this Super Bowl LI rematch. The Patriots defense, for the first time this season, were able to hold an opposing quarterback under 300 passing yards, with Matt Ryan only logging 233. The defense also made key stops, including blocking a field goal, stopping the Falcons in the red zone resulting in a missed field goal, and stopping Atlanta on a 4th down attempt from the 1-yard line. During the game, an extremely dense fog covered the stadium for most of the contest, resulting in the television broadcast being forced to use their on-field cameras much more than normal. As the Chiefs had lost to Oakland on Thursday Night Football, the Patriots' win against the Falcons moved them into a three-way tie for the best record in the AFC with the Chiefs and Steelers. This was New England's 6th win against the Falcons since 2001.

==== Week 8: vs. Los Angeles Chargers ====
Week Eight: Los Angeles Chargers at New England Patriots – Game summary

| Quarter | 1 | 2 | 3 | 4 | Total |
|---|---|---|---|---|---|
| Chargers | 7 | 0 | 0 | 6 | **13** |
| **Patriots** | 0 | 15 | 3 | 3 | **21** |

at Gillette Stadium, Foxborough, Massachusetts

- Date: October 29
- Game time: 1:00 p.m. EDT
- Game weather: 62 °F (17 °C), rain
- Game attendance: 65,878
- Referee: Pete Morelli
- TV announcers (CBS): Ian Eagle, Dan Fouts and Evan Washburn
- Recap, Gamebook

Game information

**First quarter**

- LAC – Melvin Gordon 87-yard run (Nick Novak kick), 6:15. Chargers 7–0. **Drive: 2 plays, 88 yards, 0:53.**

**Second quarter**

- NE – Rob Gronkowski 2-yard pass from Tom Brady (Stephen Gostkowski kick), 14:56. Tied 7–7. **Drive: 14 plays, 77 yards, 6:19.**
- NE – Travis Benjamin tackled in end zone by Brandon King for a safety, 9:08. Patriots 9–7.
- NE – Stephen Gostkowski 25-yard field goal, 4:06. Patriots 12–7. **Drive: 11 plays, 51 yards, 5:02.**
- NE – Stephen Gostkowski 36-yard field goal, 0:20. Patriots 15–7. **Drive: 7 plays, 73 yards, 1:40.**

**Third quarter**

- NE – Stephen Gostkowski 43-yard field goal, 5:25. Patriots 18–7. **Drive: 12 plays, 52 yards, 5:27.**

**Fourth quarter**

- LAC – Travis Benjamin 24-yard pass from Philip Rivers (pass failed), 8:30. Patriots 18–13. **Drive: 3 plays, 67 yards, 1:06.**
- NE – Stephen Gostkowski 26-yard field goal, 1:08. Patriots 21–13. **Drive: 10 plays, 58 yards, 3:33.**

**Top passers**

- LAC – Philip Rivers – 17/30, 212 yards, TD, INT
- NE – Tom Brady – 32/47, 333 yards, TD

**Top rushers**

- LAC – Melvin Gordon – 14 rushes, 132 yards, TD
- NE – Dion Lewis – 15 rushes, 44 yards

**Top receivers**

- LAC – Travis Benjamin – 5 receptions, 64 yards, TD
- NE – James White – 5 receptions, 85 yards

In their last game before the bye week, the Patriots took on the Los Angeles Chargers at home. The teams traded punts on the opening two possessions. The Chargers scored first on an 87-yard run by Melvin Gordon, matching a 56-year old Chargers record. With the next drive, the Patriots scored on a 2-yard pass to Rob Gronkowski at the start of the second quarter. Later in the second quarter, the Chargers returner Travis Benjamin caught a Ryan Allen punt at his own 8-yard line and ran backwards into his own endzone in an attempt to evade the Patriots coverage team. The resulting safety by Brandon King gave the Patriots their first lead at 9–7, and the Patriots would never trail again, kicking four field goals, and holding off a late-game surge by the Chargers to preserve a 21–13 win.

The game was notable for the performances by Patriots running backs. Heavy rain slowed down the long passing game, so short passes to the running backs dominated the Patriots offensive game plan. Running backs James White and Rex Burkhead led the Patriots in receiving with 85 yards and 68 yards respectively, mostly on yards after catch. Fellow running back Dion Lewis led the Patriots in ground yardage for the fourth straight week, with Mike Gillislee also contributing to key short-yardage situations.

With the win, the Patriots entered the bye week and improved to 6–2. A few days after this, the Patriots sent backup QB Jimmy Garoppolo to the San Francisco 49ers for a second-round draft pick. Garoppolo led the 49ers to five consecutive wins after replacing C. J. Beathard.

==== Week 10: at Denver Broncos ====
Week Ten: New England Patriots at Denver Broncos – Game summary

| Quarter | 1 | 2 | 3 | 4 | Total |
|---|---|---|---|---|---|
| **Patriots** | 14 | 13 | 7 | 7 | **41** |
| Broncos | 6 | 3 | 7 | 0 | **16** |

at Sports Authority Field at Mile High, Denver, Colorado

- Date: November 12
- Game time: 8:30 p.m. EST/6:30 p.m. MST
- Game weather: 48 °F (9 °C), partly cloudy
- Game attendance: 76,820
- Referee: Walt Coleman
- TV announcers (NBC): Al Michaels, Cris Collinsworth and Michele Tafoya
- Recap, Gamebook

Game information

**First quarter**

- NE – Rex Burkhead 14-yard pass from Tom Brady (Stephen Gostkowski kick), 12:36. Patriots 7–0. **Drive: 2 plays, 24 yards, 0:46.**
- DEN – Brandon McManus 39-yard field goal, 8:42. Patriots 7–3. **Drive: 8 plays, 58 yards, 3:57.**
- NE – Dion Lewis 103-yard kick return (Stephen Gostkowski kick), 8:24. Patriots 14–3. **Drive: 0 plays, 103 yards, 0:15.**
- DEN – Brandon McManus 33-yard field goal, 5:22. Patriots 14–6. **Drive: 8 plays, 64 yards, 3:06.**

**Second quarter**

- NE – Stephen Gostkowski 25-yard field goal, 13:41. Patriots 17–6. **Drive: 14 plays, 68 yards, 6:40.**
- NE – Stephen Gostkowski 28-yard field goal, 8:51. Patriots 20–6. **Drive: 5 plays, 20 yards, 1:51.**
- DEN – Brandon McManus 36-yard field goal, 2:40. Patriots 20–9. **Drive: 12 plays, 63 yards, 6:11.**
- NE – Dwayne Allen 11-yard pass from Tom Brady (Stephen Gostkowski kick), 0:31. Patriots 27–9. **Drive: 9 plays, 64 yards, 2:11.**

**Third quarter**

- DEN – Demaryius Thomas 7-yard pass from Brock Osweiler (Brandon McManus kick), 8:01. Patriots 27–16. **Drive: 13 plays, 75 yards, 7:06.**
- NE – Dion Lewis 8-yard run (Stephen Gostkowski kick), 4:38. Patriots 34–16. **Drive: 7 plays, 75 yards, 3:18.**

**Fourth quarter**

- NE – Tom Brady 6-yard pass to James White (Stephen Gostkowski kick), 9:04. Patriots 41–16. **Drive: 16 plays, 94 yards, 7:31.**

**Top passers**

- NE – Tom Brady – 25/34, 266 yards, 3 TD
- DEN – Brock Osweiler – 18/33, 221 yards, TD, INT

**Top rushers**

- NE – Dion Lewis – 14 rushes, 55 yards, TD
- DEN – C. J. Anderson – 10 rushes, 54 yards

**Top receivers**

- NE – Brandin Cooks – 6 receptions, 74 yards, Rob Gronkowski – 4 receptions, 74 yards
- DEN – Emmanuel Sanders – 6 receptions, 137 yards

The Patriots usually play very well coming off of a bye week and 2017 was no exception. The Patriots opened the game with a 3-and-out, but on the ensuing punt, Denver returner Isaiah McKenzie muffed the return, and it was recovered by the Patriots. Brady capitalized quickly, as two quick completions to Rex Burkhead gave the Pats the lead at 12:43 in the first quarter, a lead they would not relinquish. The Broncos answered with a field goal, and on the ensuing kickoff, Pats special teams came through again with a Dion Lewis kick return for a touchdown. The Broncos added a second field goal in the first quarter, while the Patriots responded with one of their own at the start of the second quarter. The Broncos next drive stalled out short of midfield, and Burkhead found a hole in the line to block the Riley Dixon punt, once again giving the Patriots good field position. The Patriots and Broncos traded field goals, and the Patriots closed out the first half with a Brady-to-Dwayne Allen touchdown, his first reception of the season. The Broncos only sustained touchdown drive came at the start of the second half, ending in a Brock Osweiler-to-Demaryius Thomas seven-yard pass. Two more touchdowns by the Patriots (a run by Lewis and a reception by James White) would seal the deal, with Brady taking a rest at the end of the game to give new acquisition Brian Hoyer some game-time reps.

For his performance, Brady was named the AFC Offensive Player of the Week, his third this season and the 30th of his career. In addition, running back Dion Lewis also earned honors, receiving the AFC Special Teams Player of the Week award.

==== Week 11: at Oakland Raiders ====
NFL International Series

Week Eleven: New England Patriots at Oakland Raiders – Game summary

| Quarter | 1 | 2 | 3 | 4 | Total |
|---|---|---|---|---|---|
| **Patriots** | 7 | 10 | 13 | 3 | **33** |
| Raiders | 0 | 0 | 0 | 8 | **8** |

at Estadio Azteca, Mexico City, Mexico

- Date: November 19
- Game time: 4:25 p.m. EST/3:25 p.m. CST
- Game weather: 66 °F (19 °C), sunny
- Game attendance: 77,357
- Referee: John Hussey
- TV announcers (CBS): Jim Nantz, Tony Romo and Tracy Wolfson
- Recap, Gamebook

Game information

**First quarter**

- NE – Dion Lewis 15-yard pass from Tom Brady (Stephen Gostkowski kick), 4:09. Patriots 7–0. **Drive: 15 plays, 87 yards, 7:07.**

**Second quarter**

- NE – Danny Amendola 5-yard pass from Tom Brady (Stephen Gostkowski kick), 5:23. Patriots 14–0. **Drive: 9 plays, 80 yards, 3:32.**
- NE – Stephen Gostkowski 62-yard field goal, 0:00. Patriots 17–0. **Drive: 5 plays, 48 yards, 0:33.**

**Third quarter**

- NE – Brandin Cooks 64-yard pass from Tom Brady (Stephen Gostkowski kick), 14:06. Patriots 24–0. **Drive: 3 plays, 75 yards, 0:54.**
- NE – Stephen Gostkowski 51-yard field goal, 7:04. Patriots 27–0. **Drive: 8 plays, 47 yards, 3:57.**
- NE – Stephen Gostkowski 40-yard field goal, 2:03. Patriots 30–0. **Drive: 5 plays, 22 yards, 2:36.**

**Fourth quarter**

- OAK – Amari Cooper 9-yard pass from Derek Carr (Derek Carr-Michael Crabtree pass), 11:43. Patriots 30–8. **Drive: 13 plays, 75 yards, 5:20.**
- NE – Stephen Gostkowski 29-yard field goal, 8:15. Patriots 33–8. **Drive: 8 plays, 59 yards, 3:28.**

**Top passers**

- NE – Tom Brady – 30/37, 339 yards, 3 TD
- OAK – Derek Carr – 28/49, 237 yards, TD, INT

**Top rushers**

- NE – Dion Lewis – 10 rushes, 60 yards
- OAK – Marshawn Lynch – 11 rushes, 67 yards

**Top receivers**

- NE – Brandin Cooks – 6 receptions, 149 yards, TD
- OAK – Michael Crabtree – 6 receptions, 51 yards

Tom Brady became the first player to pass for 300 yards in three different countries: USA, Mexico, and the United Kingdom.

==== Week 12: vs. Miami Dolphins ====
Week Twelve: Miami Dolphins at New England Patriots – Game summary

| Quarter | 1 | 2 | 3 | 4 | Total |
|---|---|---|---|---|---|
| Dolphins | 0 | 10 | 0 | 7 | **17** |
| **Patriots** | 14 | 7 | 7 | 7 | **35** |

at Gillette Stadium, Foxborough, Massachusetts

- Date: November 26
- Game time: 1:00 p.m. EST
- Game weather: 47 °F (8 °C), partly cloudy
- Game attendance: 65,878
- Referee: Ronald Torbert
- TV announcers (CBS): Ian Eagle, Dan Fouts and Evan Washburn
- Recap, Gamebook

Game information

**First quarter**

- NE – Rex Burkhead 2-yard run (Stephen Gostkowski kick), 11:39. Patriots 7–0. **Drive: 8 plays, 75 yards, 3:21.**
- NE – Rob Gronkowski 5-yard pass from Tom Brady (Stephen Gostkowski kick), 5:33. Patriots 14–0. **Drive: 9 plays, 88 yards, 4:39.**

**Second quarter**

- MIA – Reshad Jones 14-yard fumble return (Cody Parkey kick), 13:19. Patriots 14–7.
- NE – Rex Burkhead 1-yard pass from Tom Brady (Stephen Gostkowski kick), 8:29. Patriots 21–7. **Drive: 9 plays, 78 yards, 4:50.**
- MIA – Cody Parkey 28-yard field goal, 4:06. Patriots 21–10. **Drive: 9 plays, 65 yards, 4:23.**

**Third quarter**

- NE – Rob Gronkowski 15-yard pass from Tom Brady (Stephen Gostkowski kick), 10:28. Patriots 28–10. **Drive: 7 plays, 77 yards, 2:46.**

**Fourth quarter**

- MIA – Kenyan Drake 5-yard pass from Matt Moore (Cody Parkey kick), 11:43. Patriots 28–17. **Drive: 8 plays, 73 yards, 3:12.**
- NE – Brandin Cooks 5-yard pass from Tom Brady (Stephen Gostkowski kick), 6:31. Patriots 35–17. **Drive: 5 plays, 38 yards, 2:10.**

**Top passers**

- MIA – Matt Moore – 23/34, 215 yards, TD, 2 INT
- NE – Tom Brady – 18/28, 227 yards, 4 TD, INT

**Top rushers**

- MIA – Damien Williams – 8 rushes, 38 yards
- NE – Dion Lewis – 15 rushes, 112 yards

**Top receivers**

- MIA – Jarvis Landry – 8 receptions, 70 yards
- NE – Brandin Cooks – 6 receptions, 83 yards, TD

==== Week 13: at Buffalo Bills ====
Week Thirteen: New England Patriots at Buffalo Bills – Game summary

| Quarter | 1 | 2 | 3 | 4 | Total |
|---|---|---|---|---|---|
| **Patriots** | 3 | 6 | 14 | 0 | **23** |
| Bills | 0 | 3 | 0 | 0 | **3** |

at New Era Field, Orchard Park, New York

- Date: December 3
- Game time: 1:00 p.m. EST
- Game weather: 48 °F (9 °C), mostly cloudy
- Game attendance: 68,499
- Referee: Gene Steratore
- TV announcers (CBS): Jim Nantz, Tony Romo and Tracy Wolfson
- Recap, Gamebook

Game information

**First quarter**

- NE – Stephen Gostkowski 50-yard field goal, 1:30. Patriots 3–0. **Drive: 14 plays, 59 yards, 6:21.**

**Second quarter**

- NE – Stephen Gostkowski 31-yard field goal, 6:26. Patriots 6–0. **Drive: 7 plays, 56 yards, 3:21.**
- BUF – Stephen Hauschka 49-yard field goal, 3:205. Patriots 6–3. **Drive: 7 plays, 45 yards, 3:21.**
- NE – Stephen Gostkowski 39-yard field goal, 0:15. Patriots 9–3. **Drive: 10 plays, 55 yards, 2:50.**

**Third quarter**

- NE – Rex Burkhead 1-yard run (Stephen Gostkowski kick), 9:02. Patriots 16–3. **Drive: 10 plays, 70 yards, 5:58.**
- NE – Rex Burkhead 14-yard run (Stephen Gostkowski kick), 1:08. Patriots 23–3. **Drive: 9 plays, 78 yards, 4:38.**

**Fourth quarter**

- No scoring plays.

**Top passers**

- NE – Tom Brady – 21/30, 258 yards, INT
- BUF – Tyrod Taylor – 9/18, 65 yards, INT

**Top rushers**

- NE – Dion Lewis – 15 rushes, 92 yards
- BUF – LeSean McCoy – 15 rushes, 93 yards

**Top receivers**

- NE – Rob Gronkowski – 9 receptions, 147 yards
- BUF – Zay Jones – 2 receptions, 22 yards

Rob Gronkowski was suspended for one game after a late hit on Bills defensive back Tre'Davious White.

==== Week 14: at Miami Dolphins ====
Week Fourteen: New England Patriots at Miami Dolphins – Game summary

| Quarter | 1 | 2 | 3 | 4 | Total |
|---|---|---|---|---|---|
| Patriots | 0 | 10 | 0 | 10 | **20** |
| **Dolphins** | 6 | 7 | 14 | 0 | **27** |

at Hard Rock Stadium, Miami Gardens, Florida

- Date: December 11
- Game time: 8:30 p.m. EST
- Game weather: 55 °F (13 °C), clear
- Game attendance: 65,548
- Referee: Pete Morelli
- TV announcers (ESPN): Sean McDonough, Jon Gruden and Lisa Salters
- Recap, Gamebook

Game information

**First quarter**

- MIA – Cody Parkey 30-yard field goal, 9:01. Dolphins 3–0. **Drive: 13 plays, 69 yards, 5:59.**
- MIA – Cody Parkey 44-yard field goal, 3:49. Dolphins 6–0. **Drive: 8 plays, 34 yards, 4:26.**

**Second quarter**

- NE – Rex Burkhead 3-yard run (Stephen Gostkowski kick), 6:18. Patriots 7–6. **Drive: 5 plays, 51 yards, 2:56.**
- MIA – Jarvis Landry 5-yard pass from Jay Cutler (Cody Parkey kick), 3:33. Dolphins 13–7. **Drive: 7 plays, 80 yards, 2:45.**
- NE – Stephen Gostkowski 46-yard field goal, 0:02. Dolphins 13–10. **Drive: 8 plays, 47 yards, 3:31.**

**Third quarter**

- MIA – Jakeem Grant 25-yard pass from Jay Cutler (Cody Parkey kick), 11:03. Dolphins 20–10. **Drive: 5 plays, 46 yards, 2:21.**
- MIA – Jarvis Landry 4-yard pass from Jay Cutler (Cody Parkey kick), 4:43. Dolphins 27–10. **Drive: 8 plays, 82 yards, 4:21.**

**Fourth quarter**

- NE – James White 3-yard pass from Tom Brady (Stephen Gostkowski kick), 13:05. Dolphins 27–17. **Drive: 6 plays, 53 yards, 2:29.**
- NE – Stephen Gostkowski 33-yard field goal, 0:53. Dolphins 27–20. **Drive: 6 plays, 62 yards, 1:31.**

**Top passers**

- NE – Tom Brady – 24/43, 233 yards, TD, 2 INT
- MIA – Jay Cutler – 25/38, 263 yards, 3 TD

**Top rushers**

- NE – Dion Lewis – 5 carries, 17 yards
- MIA – Kenyan Drake – 25 carries, 114 yards

**Top receivers**

- NE – Danny Amendola – 6 receptions, 76 yards
- MIA – Jarvis Landry – 8 receptions, 46 yards, 2 TD

The Pats' 14-game road win streak ended in Miami, the same place where they suffered their last regular season road loss on January 3, 2016. Rob Gronkowski missed this game due to suspension.

==== Week 15: at Pittsburgh Steelers ====
Week Fifteen: New England Patriots at Pittsburgh Steelers – Game summary

| Quarter | 1 | 2 | 3 | 4 | Total |
|---|---|---|---|---|---|
| **Patriots** | 7 | 3 | 6 | 11 | **27** |
| Steelers | 7 | 10 | 7 | 0 | **24** |

at Heinz Field, Pittsburgh, Pennsylvania

- Date: December 17
- Game time: 4:25 p.m. EST
- Game weather: 42 °F (6 °C), mostly cloudy
- Game attendance: 68,574
- Referee: Tony Corrente
- TV announcers (CBS): Jim Nantz, Tony Romo and Tracy Wolfson
- Recap, Gamebook

Game information

**First quarter**

- NE – Rex Burkhead 1-yard run (Stephen Gostkowski kick), 9:00. Patriots 7–0. **Drive: 6 plays, 77 yards, 3:11.**
- PIT – Eli Rogers 18-yard pass from Ben Roethlisberger (Chris Boswell kick), 5:32. Tied 7–7. **Drive: 8 plays, 69 yards, 3:28.**

**Second quarter**

- PIT – Chris Boswell 51-yard field goal, 12:15. Steelers 10–7. **Drive: 9 plays, 43 yards, 4:57.**
- NE – Stephen Gostkowski 32-yard field goal, 9:04. Tied 10–10. **Drive: 9 plays, 61 yards, 3:11.**
- PIT – Martavis Bryant 4-yard pass from Ben Roethlisberger (Chris Boswell kick), 0:25. Steelers 17–10. **Drive: 15 plays, 78 yards, 8:39.**

**Third quarter**

- NE – Brandin Cooks 4-yard pass from Tom Brady (kick failed), 8:50. Steelers 17–16. **Drive: 12 plays, 75 yards, 6:10.**
- PIT – Le'Veon Bell 3-yard run (Chris Boswell kick), 1:33. Steelers 24–16. **Drive: 5 plays, 22 yards, 2:58.**

**Fourth quarter**

- NE – Stephen Gostkowski 46-yard field goal, 3:56. Steelers 24–19. **Drive: 9 plays, 44 yards, 3:42.**
- NE – Dion Lewis 8-yard run (Tom Brady-Rob Gronkowski pass), 0:56. Patriots 27–24. **Drive: 5 plays, 77 yards, 1:10.**

**Top passers**

- NE – Tom Brady – 22/35, 298 yards, TD, INT
- PIT – Ben Roethlisberger – 22/30, 281 yards, 2 TD, INT

**Top rushers**

- NE – Dion Lewis – 13 rushes, 67 yards, TD
- PIT – Le'Veon Bell – 24 rushes, 117 yards, TD

**Top receivers**

- NE – Rob Gronkowski – 9 receptions, 168 yards
- PIT – JuJu Smith-Schuster – 6 receptions, 114 yards

The return of Rob Gronkowski, and a late-game interception resulted in the Patriots defeating the Steelers. The Pats won the AFC East for the 9th straight year. The Patriots trailed 24–16 at the end of the third quarter. They scored on a 46-yard field goal with 4:00 left in the game to pull within 24–19. Then, with 56 seconds remaining, Dion Lewis scored on an 8-yard run and the Patriots added a two-point conversion to go ahead 27–24.

JuJu Smith-Schuster set the Steelers up deep in Patriots territory with a 69-yard reception from Ben Roethlisberger. It looked like Pittsburgh regained the lead on a 10-yard touchdown pass from Roethlisberger to tight end Jesse James. However, the play was overturned and the Steelers couldn't find the end zone. The game ended on a Roethlisberger interception. With this win, the Patriots improved to 11–3 and clinched the AFC East division title for the 9th consecutive season.

Steelers wide receiver Antonio Brown left in the first half with a bruised calf. He was taken to the hospital and didn't return.

==== Week 16: vs. Buffalo Bills ====
Week Sixteen: Buffalo Bills at New England Patriots – Game summary

| Quarter | 1 | 2 | 3 | 4 | Total |
|---|---|---|---|---|---|
| Bills | 3 | 10 | 3 | 0 | **16** |
| **Patriots** | 0 | 13 | 10 | 14 | **37** |

at Gillette Stadium, Foxborough, Massachusetts

- Date: December 24
- Game time: 1:00 p.m. EST
- Game weather: 35 °F (2 °C), cloudy
- Game attendance: 65,878
- Referee: Craig Wrolstad
- TV announcers (CBS): Jim Nantz, Tony Romo and Tracy Wolfson
- Recap, Gamebook

Game information

**First quarter**

- BUF – Stephen Hauschka 41-yard field goal, 5:30. Bills 3–0. **Drive: 16 plays, 47 yards, 8:04.**

**Second quarter**

- NE – Stephen Gostkowski 21-yard field goal, 14:14. Tied 3–3. **Drive: 13 plays, 79 yards, 6:16.**
- BUF – Jordan Poyer 19-yard interception return (Stephen Hauschka kick), 10:28. Bills 10–3.
- NE – Rob Gronkowski 17-yard pass from Tom Brady (Stephen Gostkowski kick), 7:06. Tied 10–10. **Drive: 9 plays, 75 yards, 3:22.**
- NE – Stephen Gostkowski 40-yard field goal, 1:55. Patriots 13–10. **Drive: 7 plays, 66 yards, 3:00.**
- BUF – Stephen Hauschka 23-yard field goal, 0:00. Tied 13–13. **Drive: 13 plays, 71 yards, 1:55.**

**Third quarter**

- BUF – Stephen Hauschka 30-yard field goal, 10:21. Bills 16–13. **Drive: 10 plays, 63 yards, 4:39.**
- NE – Stephen Gostkowski 34-yard field goal, 5:08. Tied 16–16. **Drive: 13 plays, 59 yards, 5:13.**
- NE – Mike Gillislee 1-yard run (Stephen Gostkowski kick), 0:55. Patriots 23–16. **Drive: 4 plays, 65 yards, 1:59.**

**Fourth quarter**

- NE – Dion Lewis 12-yard pass from Tom Brady (Stephen Gostkowski kick), 9:27. Patriots 30–16. **Drive: 7 plays, 60 yards, 3:41.**
- NE – Dion Lewis 4-yard run (Stephen Gostkowski kick), 3:58. Patriots 37–16. **Drive: 8 plays, 54 yards, 3:25.**

**Top passers**

- BUF – Tyrod Taylor – 21/38, 281 yards
- NE – Tom Brady – 21/28, 224 yards, 2 TD, INT

**Top rushers**

- BUF – LeSean McCoy – 17 rushes, 71 yards
- NE – Dion Lewis – 24 rushes, 129 yards, TD

**Top receivers**

- BUF – Deonte Thompson – 4 receptions, 91 yards
- NE – Rob Gronkowski – 5 receptions, 67 yards, TD

Tom Brady passed for a pair of touchdowns and the New England Patriots stayed on track to claim home-field advantage throughout the AFC playoffs with a 37–16 win over the Buffalo Bills on Sunday and also with the Jacksonville Jaguars losing late in the day, the Patriots clinched a first round bye for the 8th consecutive season.

Dion Lewis caught a touchdown pass and rushed for a 4-yard score. He carried 24 times for career-high 129 yards. It was just his second-career 100-yard game. Mike Gillislee (former Bill himself), active for the first time in six games, added a 1-yard rushing touchdown.

==== Week 17: vs. New York Jets ====
Week Seventeen: New York Jets at New England Patriots – Game summary

| Quarter | 1 | 2 | 3 | 4 | Total |
|---|---|---|---|---|---|
| Jets | 3 | 0 | 0 | 3 | **6** |
| **Patriots** | 7 | 14 | 3 | 2 | **26** |

at Gillette Stadium, Foxborough, Massachusetts

- Date: December 31
- Game time: 1:00 p.m. EST
- Game weather: 13 °F (−11 °C), cloudy and cold
- Game attendance: 65,878
- Referee: Brad Allen
- TV announcers (CBS): Jim Nantz, Tony Romo and Tracy Wolfson
- Recap, Gamebook

Game information

**First quarter**

- NE – Dion Lewis 3-yard run (Stephen Gostkowski kick), 9:30. Patriots 7–0. **Drive: 13 plays, 75 yards, 5:30.**
- NYJ – Chandler Catanzaro 48-yard field goal, 1:42. Patriots 7–3. **Drive: 7 plays, 52 yards, 3:10.**

**Second quarter**

- NE – Brandin Cooks 5-yard pass from Tom Brady (Stephen Gostkowski kick), 4:14. Patriots 14–3. **Drive: 10 plays, 73 yards, 4:23.**
- NE – Dion Lewis 5-yard pass from Tom Brady (Stephen Gostkowski kick), 0:20. Patriots 21–3. **Drive: 9 plays, 58 yards, 1:41.**

**Third quarter**

- NE – Stephen Gostkowski 21-yard field goal, 1:29. Patriots 24–3. **Drive: 12 plays, 77 yards, 6:29.**

**Fourth quarter**

- NYJ – Chandler Catanzaro 35-yard field goal, 10:28. Patriots 24–6. **Drive: 8 plays, 79 yards, 3:03.**
- NE – Bryce Petty sacked in end zone by Eric Lee for safety, 6:04. Patriots 26–6.

**Top passers**

- NYJ – Bryce Petty – 19/36, 232 yards
- NE – Tom Brady – 18/37, 190 yards, 2 TD

**Top rushers**

- NYJ – Bilal Powell – 13 rushes, 46 yards
- NE – Dion Lewis – 26 rushes, 93 yards, TD

**Top receivers**

- NYJ – Neal Sterling – 5 receptions, 74 yards
- NE – Brandin Cooks – 5 receptions, 79 yards, TD

With the win, the New England Patriots gained the #1 seed and home-field advantage throughout the entire AFC playoffs for the second year in a row.

=== Standings ===
==== Division ====
AFC East
| | W | L | T | PCT | DIV | CONF | PF | PA | STK |
|---|---|---|---|---|---|---|---|---|---|
| ^{(1)} New England Patriots | 13 | 3 | 0 | .813 | 5–1 | 10–2 | 458 | 296 | W3 |
| ^{(6)} Buffalo Bills | 9 | 7 | 0 | .563 | 3–3 | 7–5 | 302 | 359 | W1 |
| Miami Dolphins | 6 | 10 | 0 | .375 | 2–4 | 5–7 | 281 | 393 | L3 |
| New York Jets | 5 | 11 | 0 | .313 | 2–4 | 5–7 | 298 | 382 | L4 |

==== Conference ====
AFC
| # | Team | Division | W | L | T | PCT | DIV | CONF | SOS | SOV | STK |
|---|---|---|---|---|---|---|---|---|---|---|---|
**Division leaders**
| 1 (Note: New England claimed the No. 1 seed over Pittsburgh based on head-to-head victory.) | New England Patriots | East | 13 | 3 | 0 | .813 | 5–1 | 10–2 | .484 | .466 | W3 |
| 2 | Pittsburgh Steelers | North | 13 | 3 | 0 | .813 | 6–0 | 10–2 | .453 | .423 | W2 |
| 3 (Note: Jacksonville claimed the No. 3 seed over Kansas City based on conference record.) | Jacksonville Jaguars | South | 10 | 6 | 0 | .625 | 4–2 | 9–3 | .434 | .394 | L2 |
| 4 | Kansas City Chiefs | West | 10 | 6 | 0 | .625 | 5–1 | 8–4 | .477 | .481 | W4 |
**Wild Cards**
| 5 (Note: Tennessee finished ahead of Buffalo, Baltimore and Los Angeles Chargers based on conference record, claiming the No. 5 seed. Buffalo and Baltimore finished ahead of Los Angeles Chargers based on conference record. Buffalo claimed the No. 6 seed over Baltimore based on strength of victory.) | Tennessee Titans | South | 9 | 7 | 0 | .563 | 5–1 | 8–4 | .434 | .396 | W1 |
| 6 | Buffalo Bills | East | 9 | 7 | 0 | .563 | 3–3 | 7–5 | .492 | .396 | W1 |
**Did not qualify for the postseason**
| 7 | Baltimore Ravens | North | 9 | 7 | 0 | .563 | 3–3 | 7–5 | .441 | .299 | L1 |
| 8 | Los Angeles Chargers | West | 9 | 7 | 0 | .563 | 3–3 | 6–6 | .457 | .347 | W2 |
| 9 | Cincinnati Bengals | North | 7 | 9 | 0 | .438 | 3–3 | 6–6 | .465 | .321 | W2 |
| 10 (Note: Oakland finished ahead of Miami based on head-to-head victory.) | Oakland Raiders | West | 6 | 10 | 0 | .375 | 2–4 | 5–7 | .512 | .396 | L4 |
| 11 | Miami Dolphins | East | 6 | 10 | 0 | .375 | 2–4 | 5–7 | .543 | .531 | L3 |
| 12 (Note: Denver finished ahead of the New York Jets based on head-to-head victory.) | Denver Broncos | West | 5 | 11 | 0 | .313 | 2–4 | 4–8 | .492 | .413 | L2 |
| 13 | New York Jets | East | 5 | 11 | 0 | .313 | 2–4 | 5–7 | .520 | .438 | L4 |
| 14 (Note: Indianapolis finished ahead of Houston based on head-to-head sweep.) | Indianapolis Colts | South | 4 | 12 | 0 | .250 | 2–4 | 3–9 | .480 | .219 | W1 |
| 15 | Houston Texans | South | 4 | 12 | 0 | .250 | 1–5 | 3–9 | .516 | .375 | L6 |
| 16 | Cleveland Browns | North | 0 | 16 | 0 | .000 | 0–6 | 0–12 | .520 | – | L16 |
**Tiebreakers** (Note: When breaking ties for three or more teams under the NFL's rules, they are first broken within divisions, then comparing only the highest ranked remaining team from each division.)

== Postseason ==
| Playoff round | Date | Opponent (seed) | Result | Record | Game site | NFL.com recap |
|---|---|---|---|---|---|---|
| Wild Card | First-round bye | | | | | |
| Divisional | January 13, 2018 | Tennessee Titans (5) | W 35–14 | 1–0 | Gillette Stadium | Recap |
| AFC Championship | January 21, 2018 | Jacksonville Jaguars (3) | W 24–20 | 2–0 | Gillette Stadium | Recap |
| Super Bowl LII | February 4, 2018 | vs. Philadelphia Eagles (N1) | L 33–41 | 2–1 | U.S. Bank Stadium | Recap |

=== AFC Divisional Playoffs: vs. (5) Tennessee Titans ===
AFC Divisional Playoffs: (5) Tennessee Titans at (1) New England Patriots – Game summary

| Quarter | 1 | 2 | 3 | 4 | Total |
|---|---|---|---|---|---|
| Titans | 7 | 0 | 0 | 7 | 14 |
| Patriots | 0 | 21 | 7 | 7 | 35 |

at Gillette Stadium, Foxborough, Massachusetts

- Date: January 13, 2018
- Game time: 8:15 p.m. EST
- Game weather: 24 °F (−4 °C), clear and cold
- Game attendance: 65,878
- Referee: Ronald Torbert
- TV announcers (CBS): Jim Nantz, Tony Romo, Tracy Wolfson and Jay Feely
- Recap, Gamebook

Game information

1st quarter

- TEN – Corey Davis 15-yard pass from Marcus Mariota (Ryan Succop kick), 1:14. Titans 7–0. Drive: 11 plays, 95 yards, 5:17.

2nd quarter

- NE – James White 5-yard pass from Tom Brady (Stephen Gostkowski kick), 13:18. Tied 7–7. Drive: 7 plays, 73 yards, 2:56.
- NE – James White 6-yard run (Stephen Gostkowski kick), 9:20. Patriots 14–7. Drive: 6 plays, 48 yards, 1:56.
- NE – Chris Hogan 4-yard pass from Tom Brady (Stephen Gostkowski kick), 1:52. Patriots 21–7. Drive: 16 plays, 91 yards, 5:18.

3rd quarter

- NE – Brandon Bolden 2-yard run (Stephen Gostkowski kick), 4:02. Patriots 28–7. Drive: 9 plays, 56 yards, 4:20.

4th quarter

- NE – Rob Gronkowski 4-yard pass from Tom Brady (Stephen Gostkowski kick), 10:22. Patriots 35–7. Drive: 15 plays, 90 yards, 6:58.
- TEN – Corey Davis 11-yard pass from Marcus Mariota (Ryan Succop kick), 1:55. Patriots 35–14. Drive: 16 plays, 80 yards, 3:53.

Top passers

- TEN – Marcus Mariota – 22/37, 254 yards, 2 TD
- NE – Tom Brady – 35/53, 437 yards, 3 TD

Top rushers

- TEN – Marcus Mariota – 4 rushes, 37 yards
- NE – Dion Lewis – 15 rushes, 62 yards

Top receivers

- TEN – Eric Decker – 6 receptions, 85 yards
- NE – Danny Amendola – 11 receptions, 112 yards

The Patriots set a club playoff record by sacking Marcus Mariota eight times for their second win in three career playoff matches with the Titans franchise. The Patriots held Titans RB Derrick Henry to only 28 yards on 12 carries the week after he went for 156 yds against the Chiefs. This marked the third playoff meeting between the two clubs, the first since 2003, with the Patriots now holding a 2–1 advantage. They split the first two meetings, both in the divisional round, including the first game against the Titans' predecessor, the Houston Oilers.

=== AFC Championship: vs. (3) Jacksonville Jaguars ===
AFC Championship: (3) Jacksonville Jaguars at (1) New England Patriots – Game summary

| Quarter | 1 | 2 | 3 | 4 | Total |
|---|---|---|---|---|---|
| Jaguars | 0 | 14 | 3 | 3 | 20 |
| Patriots | 3 | 7 | 0 | 14 | 24 |

at Gillette Stadium, Foxborough, Massachusetts

- Date: January 21, 2018
- Game time: 3:05 p.m. EST
- Game weather: 48 °F (9 °C), clear and cool
- Game attendance: 65,878
- Referee: Clete Blakeman
- TV announcers (CBS): Jim Nantz, Tony Romo, Tracy Wolfson and Jay Feely
- Recap, Gamebook

Game information

First quarter

- NE – Stephen Gostkowski 31-yard field goal, 9:21. Patriots 3–0. Drive: 10 plays, 62 yards, 5:39.

Second quarter

- JAX – Marcedes Lewis 4-yard pass from Blake Bortles (Josh Lambo kick), 14:15. Jaguars 7–3. Drive: 7 plays, 76 yards, 3:36.
- JAX – Leonard Fournette 4-yard run (Josh Lambo kick), 7:06. Jaguars 14–3. Drive: 10 plays, 77 yards, 6:07.
- NE – James White 1-yard run (Stephen Gostkowski kick), 0:55. Jaguars 14–10. Drive: 6 plays, 85 yards, 1:07.

Third quarter

- JAX – Josh Lambo 54-yard field goal, 10:23. Jaguars 17–10. Drive: 9 plays, 39 yards, 4:37.

Fourth quarter

- JAX – Josh Lambo 43-yard field goal, 14:52. Jaguars 20–10. Drive: 11 plays, 66 yards, 4:49.
- NE – Danny Amendola 9-yard pass from Tom Brady (Stephen Gostkowski kick), 8:44. Jaguars 20–17. Drive: 8 plays, 85 yards, 3:19.
- NE – Danny Amendola 4-yard pass from Tom Brady (Stephen Gostkowski kick), 2:48. Patriots 24–20. Drive: 5 plays, 30 yards, 2:10.

Top passers

- JAX – Blake Bortles – 23/36, 293 yards, TD
- NE – Tom Brady – 26/38, 290 yards, 2 TD

Top rushers

- JAX – Leonard Fournette – 24 rushes, 76 yards, TD
- NE – Dion Lewis – 9 rushes, 34 yards

Top receivers

- JAX – Allen Hurns – 6 receptions, 80 yards
- NE – Danny Amendola – 7 receptions, 84 yards, 2 TD

This marked the fifth playoff meeting between the two clubs with the Patriots now holding a 4–1 advantage. This was their second meeting in the AFC Championship Game, the Patriots winning in 1996 as well.

The Pats overall record improved to 15–3. As of 2025, this remains both the last time the Patriots had played against the Jaguars in the playoffs and the last time the AFC Championship game was held in Gillette Stadium.

=== Super Bowl LII: vs. (N1) Philadelphia Eagles ===
Super Bowl LII: (N1) Philadelphia Eagles vs. (A1) New England Patriots – Game summary

| Quarter | 1 | 2 | 3 | 4 | Total |
|---|---|---|---|---|---|
| Eagles | 9 | 13 | 7 | 12 | 41 |
| Patriots | 3 | 9 | 14 | 7 | 33 |

at U.S. Bank Stadium, Minneapolis, Minnesota

- Date: February 4, 2018
- Game time: 6:30 p.m. EST/5:30 p.m. CST
- Game weather: Played indoors (dome stadium)
- Game attendance: 67,612
- Referee: Gene Steratore
- TV announcers (NBC): Al Michaels, Cris Collinsworth and Michele Tafoya
- Recap, Gamebook

Game information

First quarter

- PHI – Jake Elliott 25-yard field goal, 7:55. Eagles 3–0. Drive: 14 plays, 67 yards, 7:05.
- NE – Stephen Gostkowski 26-yard field goal, 4:17. Tied 3–3. Drive: 9 plays, 67 yards, 3:38.
- PHI – Alshon Jeffery 34-yard pass from Nick Foles (kick failed, wide right), 2:34. Eagles 9–3. Drive: 3 plays, 77 yards, 1:43.

Second quarter

- PHI – LeGarrette Blount 21-yard pass from Nick Foles (pass failed), 8:48. Eagles 15–3. Drive: 6 plays, 65 yards, 3:05.
- NE – Stephen Gostkowski 45-yard field goal, 7:24. Eagles 15–6. Drive: 5 plays, 48 yards, 1:24.
- NE – James White 26-yard run (kick failed, wide left), 2:04. Eagles 15–12. Drive: 7 plays, 90 yards, 2:57.
- PHI – Nick Foles 1-yard pass from Trey Burton (Jake Elliott kick), 0:34. Eagles 22–12. Drive: 7 plays, 70 yards, 1:30.

Third quarter

- NE – Rob Gronkowski 5-yard pass from Tom Brady (Stephen Gostkowski kick), 12:15. Eagles 22–19. Drive: 8 plays, 75 yards, 2:45.
- PHI – Corey Clement 22-yard pass from Nick Foles (Jake Elliott kick), 7:18. Eagles 29–19. Drive: 11 plays, 85 yards, 4:57.
- NE – Chris Hogan 26-yard pass from Tom Brady (Stephen Gostkowski kick), 3:23. Eagles 29–26. Drive: 7 plays, 75 yards, 3:55.

Fourth quarter

- PHI – Jake Elliott 42-yard field goal, 14:09. Eagles 32–26. Drive: 8 plays, 51 yards, 4:14.
- NE – Rob Gronkowski 4-yard pass from Tom Brady (Stephen Gostkowski kick), 9:22. Patriots 33–32. Drive: 10 plays, 75 yards, 4:47.
- PHI – Zach Ertz 11-yard pass from Nick Foles (pass failed), 2:21. Eagles 38–33. Drive: 14 plays, 75 yards, 7:01.
- PHI – Jake Elliott 46-yard field goal, 1:05. Eagles 41–33. Drive: 4 plays, 4 yards, 1:04.

Top passers

- PHI – Nick Foles – 28/43, 373 yards, 3 TD, INT
- NE – Tom Brady – 28/48, 505 yards, 3 TD

Top rushers

- PHI – LeGarrette Blount – 14 rushes, 90 yards, TD
- NE – James White – 7 rushes, 45 yards, TD

Top receivers

- PHI – Nelson Agholor – 9 receptions, 84 yards
- NE – Rob Gronkowski – 9 receptions, 116 yards, 2 TD

With this loss, the Patriots were unable to defend their Super Bowl title from last year. The team finished the season with an overall record of 15–4. However, the 33 points scored is the most ever by a team that lost the Super Bowl (since surpassed by the Eagles in Super Bowl LVII with 35). Tom Brady is also the first quarterback ever to throw for over 500 yards and lose the Super Bowl. His personal Super Bowl record dropped to 5–3. His record against the NFC East in Super Bowls also dropped to 1–3.

The Patriots, however, became the first team to appear in and play in 10 Super Bowls. But, despite the fact that they are still tied with the Cowboys and 49ers for 5 franchise wins, this loss tied them with the Broncos for most Super Bowls lost, with 5.

== Statistics ==
=== Team leaders ===
| Category | Player(s) | Value |
|---|---|---|
| Passing yards | Tom Brady | 4,577 |
| Passing touchdowns | Tom Brady | 32 |
| Rushing yards | Dion Lewis | 896 |
| Rushing touchdowns | Dion Lewis | 6 |
| Receptions | Rob Gronkowski | 69 |
| Receiving yards | Rob Gronkowski | 1,084 |
| Receiving touchdowns | Rob Gronkowski | 8 |
| Points | Stephen Gostkowski | 156 |
| Kickoff return yards | Dion Lewis | 570 |
| Punt return yards | Danny Amendola | 232 |
| Tackles | Devin McCourty | 97 |
| Sacks | Trey Flowers | 6.5 |
| Forced fumbles | Malcolm Butler | 3 |
| Interceptions | Duron Harmon | 4 |

=== League rankings ===
Offense
| Category | Value | NFL rank (out of 32) |
|---|---|---|
| Total yards | 394.2 YPG | 1st |
| Yards per play | 5.9 | 5th |
| Rushing yards | 118.1 YPG | 10th |
| Yards per rush | 4.2 | T–11th |
| Passing yards | 276.1 YPG | 2nd |
| Yards per pass | 7.9 | 3rd |
| Total touchdowns | 49 | 4th |
| Rushing touchdowns | 16 | 6th |
| Receiving touchdowns | 32 | 3rd |
| Scoring | 28.6 PPG | 2nd |
| Pass completions | 389/587 (.663) | T–15th |
| Third downs | 82/202 (.406) | 10th |
| First downs per game | 24.3 | 1st |
| Possession average | 30:37 | 11th |
| Fewest sacks allowed | 35 | 15th |
| Turnover differential | +6 | 11th |
| Fewest penalties | 95 | 7th |
| Fewest penalty yardage | 835 | 8th |

Defense
| Category | Value | NFL rank (out of 32) |
|---|---|---|
| Total yards | 366.0 YPG | 29th |
| Yards per play | 5.7 | 31st |
| Rushing yards | 114.8 YPG | 20th |
| Yards per rush | 4.7 | 30th |
| Passing yards | 251.2 YPG | 30th |
| Yards per pass | 7.3 | 25th |
| Total touchdowns | 33 | 5th |
| Rushing touchdowns | 6 | 2nd |
| Receiving touchdowns | 24 | T–21st |
| Scoring | 18.5 PPG | 5th |
| Pass completions | 367/590 (.622) | 17th |
| Third downs | 82/208 (.394) | 21st |
| First downs per game | 20.3 | T–25th |
| Sacks | 42 | T–7th |
| Forced fumbles | 9 | T–27th |
| Fumble recoveries | 5 | T–28th |
| Interceptions | 12 | T–18th |
| Fewest penalties | 111 | 24th |
| Fewest penalty yardage | 1,041 | 28th |

Special teams
| Category | Value | NFL rank (out of 32) |
|---|---|---|
| Kickoff returns | 22.2 YPR | 12th |
| Punt returns | 8.2 YPR | 18th |
| Gross punting | 43.4 YPP | 30th |
| Net punting | 41.6 YPP | 16th |
| Kickoff coverage | 18.9 YPR | 3rd |
| Punt coverage | 4.6 YPR | 4th |

Source for this section: NFL.com.

== Awards and honors ==
| Recipient | awards |
|---|---|
| Tom Brady | Week 2: AFC Offensive Player of the Week; Week 3: AFC Offensive Player of the Week; Week 3: FedEx Air Player of the Week; Week 10: AFC Offensive Player of the Week; November: AFC Offensive Player of the Month; 2017 Associated Press NFL MVP |
| Stephen Gostkowski | Week 11: AFC Special Teams Player of the week |
| Rob Gronkowski | Week 15: AFC Offensive Player of the week |
| Dion Lewis | Week 10: AFC Special Teams Player of the Week; Week 16: AFC Offensive Player of the Week |
| Jordan Richards | 2017 New England Patriots Ron Burton Community Service Award |
| Matthew Slater | 2017 New England Patriots Ed Block Courage Award |
