= Croston (surname) =

Croston is a surname. Notable people with the surname include:

- Cole Croston (born 1993), American football player
- Dave Croston (born 1963), American football player
- Jim Croston (1912–?), English rugby player and coach
