= Jelks =

Jelks is a surname. Notable people with the surname include:

- Amanda Jelks (born 1986), American actress
- Andrew Jelks (born 1993), American football player
- Edward B. Jelks (1922–2021), American archaeologist
- Greg Jelks (1961–2017), American-born Australian baseball player
- Jalen Jelks (born 1996), American football player
- John Earl Jelks (born 1959), American actor
- Mark Jelks (born 1984), American track and field athlete
- Na'Taki Osborne Jelks, American environmental scientist
- Simone Jelks (born 1986), American basketball referee
- William D. Jelks (1855–1931), American newspaper editor, publisher, and politician

== See also ==
- Jelks Preserve, Florida
