= Nick Caley =

American football coach (born 1983)

Houston Texans
- Title: Offensive coordinator

Personal information
- Born: January 22, 1983 (age 43); Canton, Ohio, U.S.

Career information
- College: John Carroll

Career history
- John Carroll (2005) Student assistant; Akron (2006–2007) Graduate assistant; Auburn (2008) Administrative assistant; Iowa State (2009–2011) Graduate assistant; Eastern Illinois (2012) Secondary coach; Arkansas (2013) Graduate assistant; Florida Atlantic (2014) Secondary coach; New England Patriots (2015–2022); Offensive assistant (2015–2016); Tight ends coach (2017–2019, 2022); Tight ends coach & fullbacks coach (2020–2021); Los Angeles Rams (2023–2024); Tight ends coach (2023); Tight ends coach & pass game coordinator (2024); Houston Texans (2025–present) Offensive coordinator

Awards and highlights
- 2× Super Bowl champion (LI, LIII)
- Coaching profile at Pro Football Reference

Nicholas Caley (born January 22, 1983) is an American professional football coach who is the offensive coordinator for the Houston Texans of the National Football League (NFL). He began coaching in the NFL after 10 years of coaching at the college level.

== Coaching career ==
=== New England Patriots ===
Caley coached at the collegiate level for 10 years before becoming part of the Patriots' staff in 2015. In 2017, he was promoted and became the tight ends coach for the Patriots. On February 5, 2017, Caley was part of the Patriots coaching staff that won Super Bowl LI. In the game, the Patriots defeated the Atlanta Falcons by a score of 34–28 in overtime. Caley was promoted to tight ends coach, during which time he coached Rob Gronkowski to Pro Bowl and All-Pro honors in 2017 New England Patriots season, when the Patriots won their second straight AFC Championship before narrowly losing in Super Bowl LII to the Philadelphia Eagles. A year later, New England defeated the Los Angeles Rams in Super Bowl LIII. In 2020, he added on the title of being the teams fullbacks coach in addition to retaining his position as tight ends coach. In 2022, Caley reverted to only coaching the tight ends for the Patriots.

=== Los Angeles Rams ===
On February 5, 2023, Caley was hired as a tight ends coach by the Los Angeles Rams. In 2024, he added the title of pass game coordinator.

=== Houston Texans ===
On February 3, 2025, Caley was hired as offensive coordinator by the Houston Texans.

== Personal life ==
Caley and his wife, Grace, have four daughters.
