= Darius Kilgo =

American football player (born 1991)

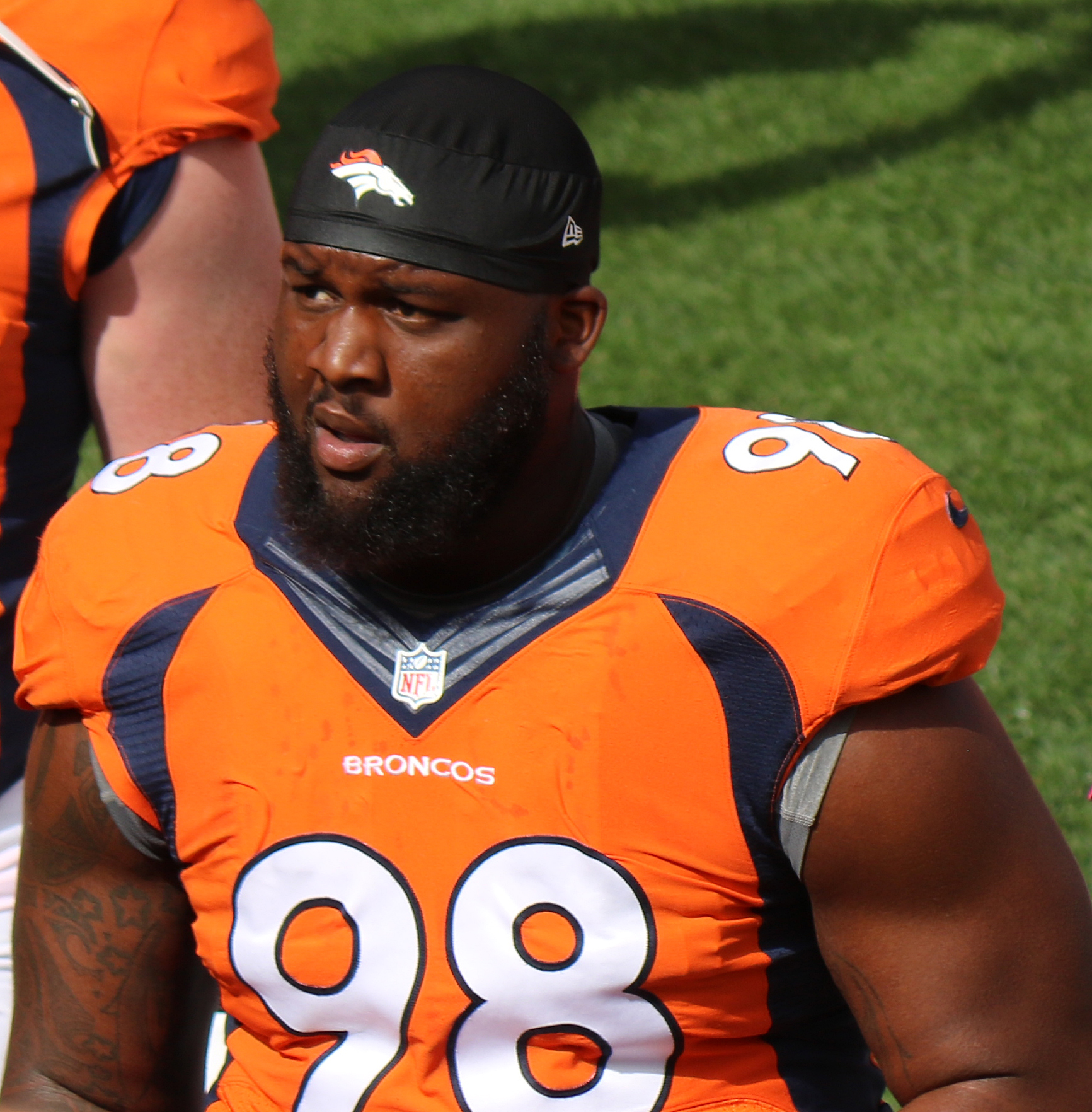
- Kilgo with the Denver Broncos in 2016

No. 98, 97
- Position: Defensive tackle

Personal information
- Born: December 14, 1991 (age 34); Matthews, North Carolina, U.S.
- Listed height: 6 ft 3 in (1.91 m)
- Listed weight: 319 lb (145 kg)

Career information
- High school: Weddington (Matthews)
- College: Maryland
- NFL draft: 2015: 6th round, 203rd overall pick

Career history
- Denver Broncos (2015–2016); New England Patriots (2016); Jacksonville Jaguars (2017)*; Houston Texans (2018)*; Tennessee Titans (2018); Detroit Lions (2019); New England Patriots (2020)*; Denver Broncos (2020)*; Arizona Cardinals (2021)*
- * Offseason or practice squad member only

Awards and highlights
- 2× Super Bowl champion (50, LI)

Career NFL statistics
- Total tackles: 16
- Stats at Pro Football Reference

Darius Kilgo (born December 14, 1991) is an American former professional football player who was a defensive tackle in the National Football League (NFL). He played college football for the Maryland Terrapins.

== Professional career ==
=== Denver Broncos (first stint) ===
Kilgo was selected in the sixth round (203rd overall) by the Denver Broncos in the 2015 NFL draft. During his rookie campaign in 2015, Kilgo appeared in nine games making six tackles and a pass defended. He was a part of the Broncos #1 defense in the NFL during the 2015 season. In the 2015 season, Kilgo and the Broncos made Super Bowl 50. Kilgo was inactive for the game. On February 7, 2016, the Broncos defeated the Carolina Panthers by a score of 24–10. On November 25, 2016, Kilgo was released by the Broncos.

=== New England Patriots (first stint) ===
Kilgo was claimed off waivers by the New England Patriots on November 28, 2016. He was released by the Patriots on December 8, 2016, and was re-signed to the practice squad. He remained on the practice squad for the remainder of the season. Kilgo's Patriots won Super Bowl LI by a score of 34–28 over the Atlanta Falcons.

On February 7, 2017, Kilgo signed a futures contract with the Patriots. On September 2, 2017, he was waived by the Patriots and signed to the practice squad the next day, only to be released the following day.

=== Jacksonville Jaguars ===
On September 8, 2017, Kilgo was signed to the Jacksonville Jaguars' practice squad.

=== Houston Texans ===
On January 30, 2018, Kilgo signed a reserve/future contract with the Houston Texans. He was waived on September 1, 2018, and was signed to the practice squad the next day. He was released on September 11, 2018.

=== Tennessee Titans ===
On September 18, 2018, Kilgo was signed to the Tennessee Titans' practice squad. He was promoted to the active roster on September 28, 2018.

On April 29, 2019, Kilgo was waived by the Titans.

=== Detroit Lions ===
On May 2, 2019, Kilgo was signed by the Detroit Lions. He was placed on injured reserve on August 10, 2019.

=== New England Patriots (second stint) ===
Kilgo signed with the Patriots on August 11, 2020. He was released on August 22, 2020.

=== Denver Broncos (second stint) ===
On October 3, 2020, Kilgo was signed to the Broncos practice squad. He was placed on the practice squad/COVID-19 list by the team on December 3, 2020, and restored to the practice squad on December 16. His practice squad contract with the team expired after the season on January 11, 2021.

=== Arizona Cardinals ===
On August 9, 2021, Kilgo signed with the Arizona Cardinals. He was waived on August 16.
