= Cody Hollister =

American football player (born 1993)

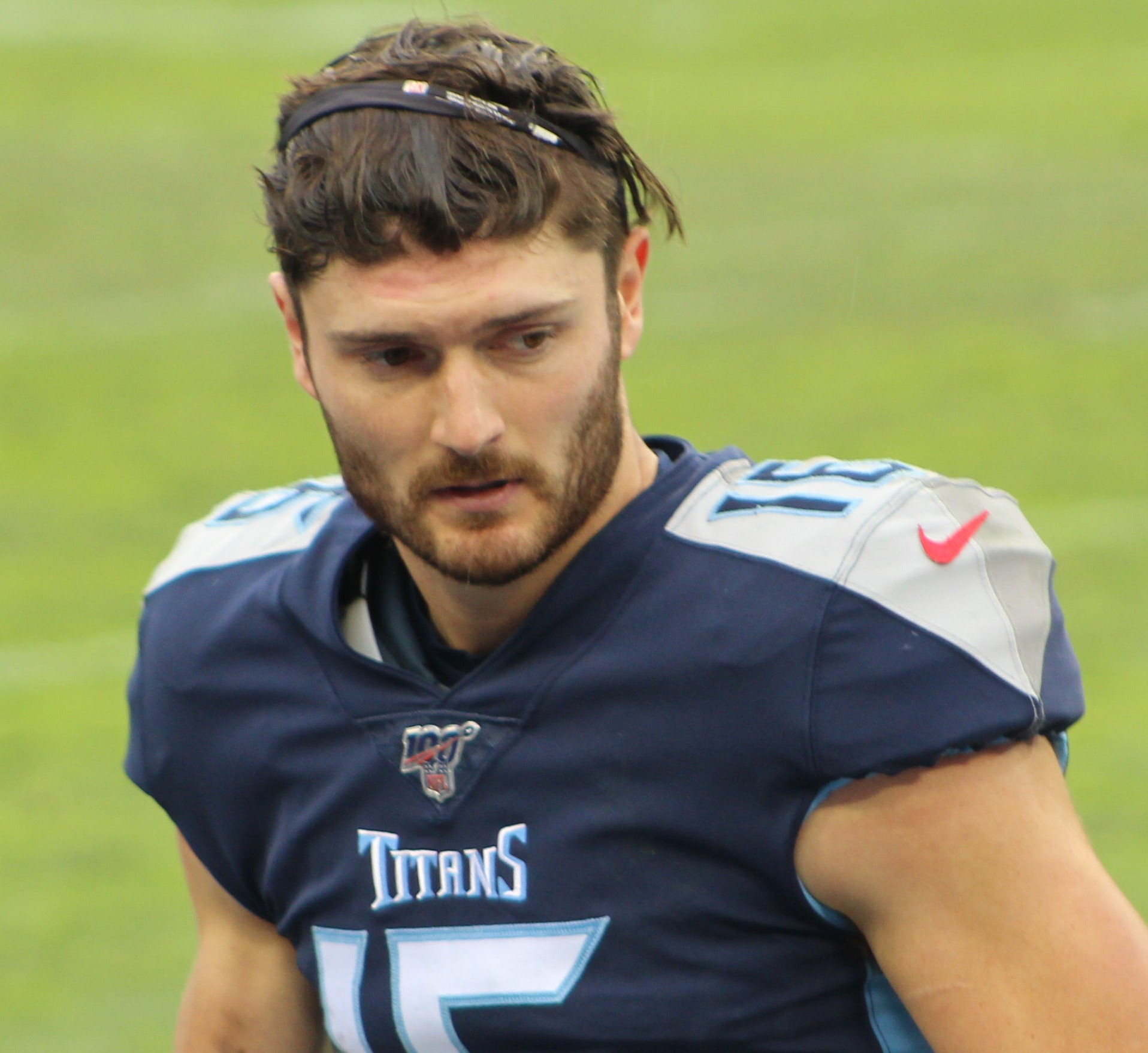
- Hollister with the Tennessee Titans in 2019

No. 15
- Position: Wide receiver

Personal information
- Born: November 18, 1993 (age 33); Bend, Oregon, U.S.
- Listed height: 6 ft 4 in (1.93 m)
- Listed weight: 216 lb (98 kg)

Career information
- High school: Mountain View (Bend)
- College: Arkansas
- NFL draft: 2017: undrafted

Career history
- New England Patriots (2017–2018); Tennessee Titans (2019–2022)

Awards and highlights
- Super Bowl champion (LIII)

Career NFL statistics
- Receptions: 10
- Receiving yards: 112
- Stats at Pro Football Reference

Cody Hollister (born November 18, 1993) is an American former professional football player who was a wide receiver in the National Football League (NFL). He played college football for the Arkansas Razorbacks.

== Professional career ==
Pre-draft measurables
Height	Weight	Arm length	Hand span	40-yard dash	10-yard split	20-yard split	Three-cone drill	Vertical jump	Broad jump	Bench press
6 ft 3 1/4 in (1.91 m)	209 lb (95 kg)	31 3/4 in (0.81 m)	9 5/8 in (0.24 m)	4.53 s	1.57 s	2.61 s	7.02 s	36.0 in (0.91 m)	10 ft 0 in (3.05 m)	29 reps
All values from Pro Day

=== New England Patriots ===
Hollister signed with the New England Patriots as an undrafted free agent on May 5, 2017. He was waived by the Patriots on September 2, 2017, and was signed to the practice squad the next day. He signed a reserve/future contract with the Patriots on February 6, 2018.

On July 24, 2018, Hollister was waived by the Patriots with a non-football injury designation. After Hollister cleared waivers and reverted to the Patriots' non-football injury list, it was later revealed that he would undergo back surgery. Hollister and his brother won Super Bowl LIII when the Patriots defeated the Los Angeles Rams 13–3.

=== Tennessee Titans ===
On May 13, 2019, Hollister signed with the Tennessee Titans. He was waived on August 31, 2019, and was signed to the practice squad the next day. He was promoted to the active roster on November 9, 2019.

On September 15, 2020, Hollister was waived by the Titans and re-signed to the practice squad two days later. He was elevated to the active roster on October 13 for the team's week 5 game against the Buffalo Bills, and reverted to the practice squad after the game. He was placed on the practice squad/COVID-19 list by the team on December 19, 2020, and restored to the practice squad on December 30.

He was signed to a futures contract by the Titans on January 11, 2021. He was placed on injured reserve on August 7, 2021. He was released on August 17. He was signed to the Titans practice squad on November 16. He was activated from the practice squad and played against the New England Patriots on November 28, 2021.

After the Titans were eliminated in the Divisional Round of the 2021 playoffs, Hollister signed a reserve/future contract on January 24, 2022. He was waived during final roster cuts on August 30, and re–signed to the team's practice squad the following day. On December 5, 2022, he was placed on injured reserve.

== Personal life ==
Cody is the twin brother of Jacob Hollister, a tight end who most recently played for the Las Vegas Raiders in the NFL.
