= Tony Washington (wide receiver) =

American football player and coach (born 1990)

Liberty Flames
- Title: Pass Game Coordinator / Wide receivers coach

Personal information
- Born: October 18, 1990 (age 36); High Point, North Carolina, U.S.

Career information
- High school: T.W. Andrews (NC)
- College: Appalachian State (2010–2013)
- NFL draft: 2014: undrafted

Career history

Playing
- Indianapolis Colts (2014)*; Jacksonville Jaguars (2014–2016); New England Patriots (2017)*
- * Offseason or practice squad member only

Coaching
- East Carolina (2018) Offensive quality control assistant; Louisville (2019) Graduate assistant; Coastal Carolina (2020–2021) Wide receivers coach; West Virginia (2022) Wide receivers coach; Liberty (2023–present) Pass Game Coordinator & Wide receivers coach

Michael Anthony Washington II (born October 18, 1990) is an American former football player who is the pass game coordinator and wide receivers coach at Liberty University. He played professionally in the National Football League (NFL) as a receiver.

Washington played college football for the Appalachian State Mountaineers. He was signed by the Indianapolis Colts as an undrafted free agent in 2014.

== Professional career ==
=== Indianapolis Colts ===
On May 11, 2014, Washington was signed by the Colts as an undrafted free agent. On August 25, 2014, he was waived by the team.

=== Jacksonville Jaguars ===
==== 2014 ====
On September 1, 2014, Washington was signed to the Jaguars' practice squad where he spent his entire rookie season. On December 29, 2014, he signed a reserve/futures contract with the Jaguars.

==== 2015 ====
On September 4, 2015, Washington was waived by the Jaguars. and was signed to the Jaguars' practice squad. On September 26, 2015, he was promoted to the active roster. He made his NFL debut the next day tallying one special team tackle. The following week, he made his first career rush for eight yards. He saw action on offense and on special teams the next two weeks before suffering a quad injury. On October 20, 2015, he was placed on injured reserve.

==== 2016 ====
On September 1, 2016, Washington was placed on injured reserve. On September 8, 2016, he was released from the Jaguars' injured reserve with an injury settlement. He was re-signed to the practice squad on November 10, 2016. He was promoted to the active roster on December 23, 2016. On May 1, 2017, he was released by the Jaguars.

=== New England Patriots ===
Washington was signed by the New England Patriots on July 27, 2017. He was waived by the Patriots on September 2, 2017.
