= Matt Lengel =

American football player (born 1990)

No. 88, 82, 86, 89
- Position: Tight end

Personal information
- Born: December 27, 1990 (age 35); Mechanicsburg, Pennsylvania, U.S.
- Listed height: 6 ft 8 in (2.03 m)
- Listed weight: 265 lb (120 kg)

Career information
- High school: Cumberland Valley (Mechanicsburg)
- College: Eastern Kentucky; Northeastern
- NFL draft: 2015: undrafted

Career history
- Cincinnati Bengals (2015–2016)*; New England Patriots (2016–2017); Cleveland Browns (2017); Houston Texans (2018)*; Cincinnati Bengals (2018); Indianapolis Colts (2019)
- * Offseason or practice squad member only

Awards and highlights
- Super Bowl champion (LI)

Career NFL statistics
- Receptions: 5
- Receiving yards: 39
- Receiving touchdowns: 2
- Stats at Pro Football Reference

Matthew Lengel (born December 27, 1990) is an American former professional football player who was a tight end in the National Football League (NFL). He was signed by the Cincinnati Bengals as an undrafted free agent in 2015. He played college football for the Eastern Kentucky Colonels and Northeastern Huskies. He also played for the New England Patriots, where he was a member of the Super Bowl LI-winning team, as well as the Cleveland Browns, Houston Texans, and Indianapolis Colts.

== College career ==
Lengel redshirted his freshman year in 2009 at Northeastern University before transferring to Eastern Kentucky the following year, after Northeastern shut down its football program. He played in 37 games over five seasons (2010–2014), totaling 33 catches for 361 yards. He suffered a torn ACL in the 2012 season opener and missed the entire season. He re-injured the same knee the following year after starting the first two games in 2013.

== Professional career ==
Pre-draft measurables
Height	Weight	Arm length	Hand span	40-yard dash	20-yard shuttle	Three-cone drill	Vertical jump	Broad jump
6 ft 7 7/8 in (2.03 m)	265 lb (120 kg)	33 3/4 in (0.86 m)	10 1/8 in (0.26 m)	4.79 s	4.33 s	7.26 s	32 in (0.81 m)	9 ft 9 in (2.97 m)
Height, weight, and 40-yard dash from NFL Combine. All other values from Eastern Kentucky Pro Day.

=== Cincinnati Bengals ===
Lengel signed with the Cincinnati Bengals as an undrafted free agent on May 8, 2015. He was released on September 5, 2015, and was signed to the practice squad the next day, where he spent his entire rookie season. He signed a reserve/future contract with the Bengals on January 11, 2016.

Lengel was released by the Bengals on September 3, 2016, and was signed to the practice squad during the next day.

=== New England Patriots ===
On November 2, 2016, Lengel was signed by the New England Patriots off the Bengals' practice squad after the Patriots lost tight end Rob Gronkowski to injury.

On December 24, 2016, Lengel caught his first career touchdown on his first career reception against the New York Jets, on an 18-yard pass from Tom Brady. On January 1, 2017, Lengel caught his second career catch from Tom Brady that went for four yards. He finished up the regular season in 2016 with two catches for 22 yards and a touchdown. The Patriots finished the season with a 14–2 record, which earned the team the top seed in the AFC playoffs. On February 5, 2017, Lengel was part of the Patriots team that won Super Bowl LI. In the game, the Patriots defeated the Atlanta Falcons by a score of 34–28 in overtime.

Lengel was tendered by the Patriots on March 7, 2017. He was waived/injured on August 27, 2017, and placed on injured reserve. He was released on September 30, 2017, with an injury settlement.

=== Cleveland Browns ===
On October 10, 2017, Lengel was signed to the Cleveland Browns' practice squad. He was promoted to the active roster on October 25, 2017.

On April 12, 2018, Lengel was waived by the Browns.

=== Houston Texans ===
On April 13, 2018, Lengel was claimed off waivers by the Houston Texans. He was waived on September 1, 2018, and was signed to the practice squad the next day.

=== Cincinnati Bengals (second stint) ===
On October 10, 2018, Lengel was signed by the Cincinnati Bengals off the Texans practice squad.

=== Indianapolis Colts ===
On November 25, 2019, Lengel was signed by the Indianapolis Colts. He was waived on December 4, 2019. He signed a reserve/future contract with the Colts on December 30, 2019. He was released on July 28, 2020.
