= D. J. Killings =

American gridiron football player (born 1995)

Boise State Broncos
- Title: Cornerbacks coach

Personal information
- Born: August 9, 1995 (age 31); Miami, Florida, U.S.
- Listed height: 5 ft 10 in (1.78 m)
- Listed weight: 195 lb (88 kg)

Career information
- High school: First Coast (Jacksonville, Florida)
- College: UCF (2013–2016)
- NFL draft: 2017: undrafted

Career history

Playing
- New England Patriots (2017)*; Philadelphia Eagles (2017–2018)*; Indianapolis Colts (2018); Green Bay Packers (2018)*; Indianapolis Colts (2019)*; Oakland / Las Vegas Raiders (2019–2020); Calgary Stampeders (2021)
- * Offseason or practice squad member only

Coaching
- Boise State (2024-2025) Defensive graduate assistant; Boise State (2026–present) (Cornerbacks)

Awards and highlights
- Super Bowl champion (LII)
- Stats at Pro Football Reference

Dorian Jamaal "D. J." Killings (born August 9, 1995) is an American former professional football cornerback who is currently a defensive graduate assistant with the Boise State Broncos. He played college football at UCF, and signed as an undrafted free agent with the New England Patriots in 2017.

== Professional career ==
Pre-draft measurables
Height	Weight	Arm length	Hand span	Wingspan	40-yard dash	10-yard split	20-yard split	20-yard shuttle	Three-cone drill	Vertical jump	Broad jump	Bench press
5 ft 10 1/2 in (1.79 m)	187 lb (85 kg)	29 3/8 in (0.75 m)	8 1/2 in (0.22 m)	6 ft 0 7/8 in (1.85 m)	4.48 s	2.59 s	1.56 s	4.21 s	6.97 s	37 1/2 in (0.95 m)	10 ft 4 in (3.15 m)	22 reps
All values from UCF Pro Day

Killings was seen as a high value undrafted free agent prospect immediately after the draft, and fielded calls from several teams.

=== New England Patriots ===
Killings signed with the New England Patriots as an undrafted free agent on May 5, 2017. He was waived/injured by the Patriots on September 2, 2017 and placed on injured reserve. He was released with an injury settlement on September 13, 2017.

=== Philadelphia Eagles ===
On October 3, 2017, Killings was signed to the Philadelphia Eagles practice squad. Killings stayed on the Eagles' practice squad while the team defeated the New England Patriots in Super Bowl LII. He signed a reserve/future contract with the Eagles on February 7, 2018.

On September 1, 2018, Killings was waived/injured by the Eagles and was placed on injured reserve. He was released on September 6, 2018.

=== Indianapolis Colts (first stint) ===
On October 16, 2018, Killings was signed to the Indianapolis Colts practice squad. He was promoted to the active roster on November 13, 2018. He was placed on injured reserve on November 20, 2018 with an ankle injury. He was released on December 10, 2018.

=== Green Bay Packers ===
On December 18, 2018, Killings was signed to the Green Bay Packers practice squad.

=== Indianapolis Colts (second stint) ===
On January 14, 2019, Killings signed a reserve/future contract with the Colts. He was waived on May 17, 2019.

=== Oakland Raiders ===
On May 30, 2019, Killings was signed by the Oakland Raiders. He was placed on injured reserve on August 11, 2019.

Killings was re-signed to a one-year contract on April 16, 2020. He chose to opt-out of the 2020 season due to the COVID-19 pandemic on August 3, 2020. He was released after the season on March 1, 2021.

=== Calgary Stampeders ===
Killings was signed to the Calgary Stampeders on May 17, 2021. He was released on November 29, 2021.
