= Antonio Garcia (gridiron football) =

American gridiron football player (born 1993)

Profile
- Position: Offensive tackle

Personal information
- Born: December 10, 1993 (age 32); Houston, Texas, U.S.
- Listed height: 6 ft 7 in (2.01 m)
- Listed weight: 305 lb (138 kg)

Career information
- High school: Charles Drew (Riverdale, Georgia)
- College: Troy
- NFL draft: 2017: 3rd round, 85th overall pick

Career history
- New England Patriots (2017); New York Jets (2018)*; Indianapolis Colts (2018–2019)*; Miami Dolphins (2019)*; Saskatchewan Roughriders (2021)*; Edmonton Elks (2022); Vegas Vipers (2023); DC Defenders (2023); Philadelphia Stars (2023); Edmonton Elks (2024)*; Winnipeg Blue Bombers (2025)*
- * Offseason or practice squad member only

Awards and highlights
- First-team All-Sun Belt (2016)
- Stats at Pro Football Reference
- Stats at CFL.ca

Antonio Garcia (born December 10, 1993) is an American professional football offensive tackle. He was selected by the New England Patriots in the third round of the 2017 NFL draft. He played college football for the Troy Trojans. He has also been a member of the New York Jets, Indianapolis Colts, Miami Dolphins, Saskatchewan Roughriders, Edmonton Elks, Vegas Vipers, DC Defenders, Philadelphia Stars, and Winnipeg Blue Bombers.

== Professional career ==
Pre-draft measurables
Height	Weight	Arm length	Hand span	40-yard dash	20-yard shuttle	Three-cone drill	Broad jump	Bench press
6 ft 6 1/4 in (1.99 m)	302 lb (137 kg)	33 3/8 in (0.85 m)	9 7/8 in (0.25 m)	5.15 s	4.94 s	7.98 s	9 ft 0 in (2.74 m)	24 reps
All values from NFL Combine

=== New England Patriots ===
Garcia was drafted by the New England Patriots in the third round, 85th overall, in the 2017 NFL draft. After leaving an August 9, 2017, training camp practice early, Garcia did not return to practice and did not play in any preseason game. On September 2, Garcia was placed on the reserve/non-football illness (NFI) list. In March 2018 it was revealed that Garcia had developed blood clots in his lungs; the resulting inability to practice led his weight to drop by at least 40 pounds.

On May 11, 2018, Garcia was released by the Patriots.

=== New York Jets ===
On May 14, 2018, Garcia was claimed off waivers by the New York Jets. He was waived on August 31, 2018.

=== Indianapolis Colts ===
On October 29, 2018, Garcia was signed to the practice squad of the Indianapolis Colts. He signed a reserve/future contract on January 13, 2019.

Garcia was suspended the first four games of the 2019 season for violating the league's performance-enhancing substance policy. He was waived on August 31, 2019. He was reinstated from suspension on October 1, 2019, while still a free agent.

=== Miami Dolphins ===
On October 7, 2019, Garcia was signed to the Miami Dolphins practice squad. He was released on October 21, 2019.

Garcia had a tryout with the Las Vegas Raiders on August 23, 2020.

=== Saskatchewan Roughriders ===
On February 2, 2021, Garcia signed with the Saskatchewan Roughriders of the Canadian Football League (CFL). He was release don July 30, 2021.

=== Edmonton Elks (first stint) ===
Garcia was signed by the Edmonton Elks of the CFL on March 16, 2022. He was released on June 14, 2022.

=== Vegas Vipers ===
Garcia was selected by the Vegas Vipers of the XFL in the 2023 XFL draft.

=== DC Defenders ===
Garcia was traded to the DC Defenders by the Vipers on March 6, 2023. He was released on April 17, 2023.

=== Philadelphia Stars ===
Garcia signed with the Philadelphia Stars of the United States Football League on May 3, 2023. He was placed on the team's retired list on May 29, 2023.

=== Edmonton Elks (second stint) ===
Garcia joined the Elks again on January 24, 2024. He was released on May 6, 2024.

=== Winnipeg Blue Bombers ===
Garcia signed with the Winnipeg Blue Bombers of the CFL on January 13, 2025. He was released on May 11.
