= Chase Farris =

American football player (born 1993)

No. 66
- Position: Offensive guard

Personal information
- Born: April 8, 1993 (age 33); Elyria, Ohio, U.S.
- Listed height: 6 ft 5 in (1.96 m)
- Listed weight: 310 lb (141 kg)

Career information
- High school: Elyria (OH)
- College: Ohio State
- NFL draft: 2016: undrafted

Career history
- Detroit Lions (2016)*; New England Patriots (2016–2017); Atlanta Legends (2019); DC Defenders (2020)*
- * Offseason or practice squad member only

Awards and highlights
- Super Bowl champion (LI); CFP national champion (2014)
- Stats at Pro Football Reference

Chase Farris (born April 8, 1993) is an American former football offensive guard. He played college football at Ohio State, and was signed by the Detroit Lions as an undrafted free agent in 2016.

== College career ==
Farris attended Ohio State University and played for the Ohio State Buckeyes football program beginning in 2012. After redshirting the 2011 season as a true freshman, Farris made the transition from defensive line to offensive line and made seven total appearances on special teams for the 2012 Ohio State Buckeyes football team. As a sophomore in 2013, Farris battled current Detroit Lions tackle Taylor Decker for a spot at the right tackle position, before being moved back to the defensive line. In seven games that season, Farris played in seven games and totaled 120 plays on defense and special teams while collecting three tackles and 1.5 tackles-for-loss. Late in the season, Farris suffered a knee injury, and would have surgery before the 2014 Orange Bowl. In his junior year, Farris played in all 15 games, and totaled 169 offensive snaps, the most of any Ohio State non-starter during the regular season and College Football Playoff, which Ohio State would go on to win. Farris played a career-high 60 snaps on offense during a 66–0 win over Kent State that season. During his senior season, his fifth with the Buckeyes, Farris started at right tackle.

Farris graduated from Ohio State with a bachelor's degree in Consumer and Family Financial Services.

== Professional career ==
Pre-draft measurables
Height	Weight	Arm length	Hand span	40-yard dash	20-yard shuttle	Three-cone drill	Vertical jump	Broad jump	Bench press
6 ft 5 in (1.96 m)	310 lb (141 kg)	32.25 in (0.82 m)	9 in (0.23 m)	5.17 s	4.8 s	7.85 s	26.5 in (0.67 m)	8 ft 6 in (2.59 m)	22 reps
All values from NFL Combine

=== Detroit Lions ===
On April 30, following the conclusion of the 2016 NFL draft, Farris signed with the Detroit Lions as an undrafted free agent. On August 29, the Lions waived Farris along with eight other players due to roster cuts. On September 9, Farris was signed to the Lions' practice squad. Almost two weeks later on September 21, Farris was once again waived from the team.

=== New England Patriots ===
On October 5, the New England Patriots signed Farris to their practice squad. He was released by the Patriots on October 26, 2016 but was re-signed back to their practice squad on November 1, 2016.

On February 5, 2017, Farris's Patriots appeared in Super Bowl LI. In the game, the Patriots defeated the Atlanta Falcons by a score of 34–28 in overtime.

On February 7, 2017, Farris signed a futures contract with the Patriots. On July 20, 2017, he was waived with a non-football injury designation after suffering a torn Achilles.

=== Atlanta Legends ===
In 2018, Farris signed with the Atlanta Legends of the Alliance of American Football. The league ceased operations in April 2019.

=== DC Defenders ===
Farris was drafted in the 9th round in phase two in the 2020 XFL draft by the DC Defenders. He was waived during final roster cuts on January 22, 2020.

== Post-playing career ==
After retiring from football, Farris worked as a financial representative for Northwestern Mutual from January to November 2020.

In 2023, he accepted the Head Coach position at Elyria Catholic High School, bringing along a staff of former Ohio State Buckeye Alumni Troy Smith and Doran Grant.
