= Jason King (American football) =

American football player (born 1993)

Profile
- Position: Guard

Personal information
- Born: November 18, 1993 (age 32); Little Rock, Arkansas
- Listed height: 6 ft 4 in (1.93 m)
- Listed weight: 300 lb (136 kg)

Career information
- High school: Pulaski Academy (Little Rock, Arkansas)
- College: Purdue
- NFL draft: 2017: undrafted

Career history
- New England Patriots (2017)*; Baltimore Ravens (2017)*; New England Patriots (2017); Birmingham Iron (2019)*
- * Offseason or practice squad member only
- Stats at Pro Football Reference

Jason Douglas King (born November 18, 1993) is an American former professional football guard. He played college football at Purdue.

== Early life and college ==
King played high school football for coach Kevin Kelley at Pulaski Academy in Little Rock, Arkansas. He graduated from Pulaski Academy in the class of 2012.

King committed to Purdue on December 26, 2011, and later signed a letter of intent to Purdue on February 1, 2012. He attended school at Purdue from 2012 until graduating in 2016, having played in 45 games during his collegiate career.

== Professional career ==
=== New England Patriots (first stint) ===
King signed with the New England Patriots as an undrafted free agent on May 5, 2017. He was waived by the Patriots on September 2, 2017. He was re-signed to the practice squad on September 20, 2017. He was released on October 9, 2017.

=== Baltimore Ravens ===
On October 31, 2017, King was signed to the Baltimore Ravens' practice squad. He was released on November 14, 2017.

=== New England Patriots (second stint) ===
On November 28, 2017, King was signed to the Patriots' active roster. He was waived by the Patriots on December 2, 2017, and was re-signed to New England's practice squad on December 5, 2017. He signed a reserve/future contract with the Patriots on February 6, 2018. He was waived on May 10, 2018, but was re-signed on May 18. He was waived again on September 1, 2018.

=== Birmingham Iron ===
In November 2018, King signed with the Birmingham Iron of the Alliance of American Football.
