= Nicholas Grigsby =

American football player (born 1992)

No. 55, 50
- Position: Linebacker

Personal information
- Born: July 2, 1992 (age 34); Trotwood, Ohio, U.S.
- Listed height: 6 ft 2 in (1.88 m)
- Listed weight: 230 lb (104 kg)

Career information
- High school: Trotwood-Madison
- College: Pittsburgh (2011–2015)
- NFL draft: 2016: undrafted

Career history
- Los Angeles Rams (2016); Baltimore Ravens (2017)*; New England Patriots (2017–2018); Detroit Lions (2018); Baltimore Ravens (2019)*; Green Bay Packers (2019)*; St. Louis Battlehawks (2020)*; Ottawa Redblacks (2021)*
- * Offseason or practice squad member only

Career NFL statistics
- Total tackles: 15
- Stats at Pro Football Reference

Nicholas Mario Grigsby (born July 2, 1992) is an American former professional football player who was a linebacker in the National Football League (NFL). He played college football for the Pittsburgh Panthers. Grigsby was signed by the Los Angeles Rams as an undrafted free agent in 2016. He was also a member of the Baltimore Ravens, New England Patriots, Detroit Lions, Green Bay Packers, St. Louis Battlehawks and Ottawa Redblacks.

== Professional career ==
Pre-draft measurables
Height	Weight	40-yard dash	10-yard split	20-yard split	20-yard shuttle	Three-cone drill	Vertical jump	Broad jump	Bench press
6 ft 0 in (1.83 m)	220 lb (100 kg)	4.51 s	1.56 s	2.57 s	4.27 s	6.90 s	36.5 in (0.93 m)	10 ft 4 in (3.15 m)	21 reps
All values are from Pro Day

=== Los Angeles Rams ===
After going undrafted in the 2016 NFL draft, Grigsby signed with the Los Angeles Rams on May 4, 2016. On September 9, 2016, he was waived. Grigsby was signed to the Rams' practice squad on September 12, 2016. On November 22, 2016, he was promoted from the practice squad to the active roster.

On September 3, 2017, Grigsby was waived by the Rams.

=== Baltimore Ravens (first stint) ===
On September 19, 2017, Grigsby was signed to the Baltimore Ravens' practice squad.

=== New England Patriots ===
On November 28, 2017, Grigsby was signed by the New England Patriots off the Ravens' practice squad. He appeared in 5 games and had 5 tackles. Grigsby and the Patriots made it to Super Bowl LII, but the Patriots lost 41–33 to the Philadelphia Eagles.

On November 13, 2018, the Patriots released Grigsby.

=== Detroit Lions ===
On November 17, 2018, Grigsby was signed to the Detroit Lions practice squad. He was promoted to the active roster on November 26, 2018. On February 15, 2019, Grigsby was released by the Lions.

=== Baltimore Ravens (second stint) ===
On July 31, 2019, Grigsby was signed by the Ravens. He was waived on August 24, 2019.

=== Green Bay Packers ===
On August 25, 2019, Grigsby was claimed off waivers by the Green Bay Packers, but was waived the next day after failing his physical.

=== St. Louis Battlehawks ===
In October 2019, Grigsby was selected by the St. Louis Battlehawks of the XFL in the 2020 XFL draft. He was waived on January 8, 2020.

=== Ottawa Redblacks ===
Grigsby signed with the Ottawa Redblacks of the Canadian Football League on January 6, 2021. He was released on June 24, 2021.
