= Andrew Jelks =

American football player (born 1993)

No. 76
- Position: Offensive tackle

Personal information
- Born: December 6, 1993 (age 32); Paris, Tennessee
- Listed height: 6 ft 6 in (1.98 m)
- Listed weight: 307 lb (139 kg)

Career information
- High school: Paris (TN) Henry County
- College: Vanderbilt
- NFL draft: 2017: undrafted

Career history
- New England Patriots (2017)
- Stats at Pro Football Reference

Andrew Jelks (born December 6, 1993) is an American former football offensive tackle. He played college football at Vanderbilt University, and was signed by the New England Patriots as an undrafted free agent after the 2017 NFL draft.

== College career ==
Jelks played in 24 games with 21 starts at Vanderbilt over the course of five seasons. Jelks missed his final two seasons in 2015 and 2016 due to injuries. He began his career at right tackle and moved to left tackle as a sophomore.

== Professional career ==
=== New England Patriots ===
Jelks was signed by the New England Patriots as an undrafted free agent on May 5, 2017. He was placed on reserve/non-football injury list prior to the start of the season due to a torn ACL suffered during pre-season workouts his senior year at Vanderbilt, and would remain on the list for the entire 2017 season.

=== Retirement ===
Jelks announced his retirement on July 19, 2018.
