= Cole Croston =

American football player (born 1993)

No. 74
- Position: Offensive tackle

Personal information
- Born: December 25, 1993 (age 32); Sergeant Bluff, Iowa, U.S.
- Listed height: 6 ft 5 in (1.96 m)
- Listed weight: 310 lb (141 kg)

Career information
- High school: Sergeant Bluff-Luton
- College: Iowa
- NFL draft: 2017: undrafted

Career history
- New England Patriots (2017–2018)

Awards and highlights
- Super Bowl champion (LIII)

Career NFL statistics
- Games played: 5
- Stats at Pro Football Reference

Cole Croston (born December 25, 1993) is an American former professional football player who was an offensive tackle for the New England Patriots of the National Football League (NFL). from 2017 to 2018 He played college football for the Iowa Hawkeyes. He won Super Bowl LIII with the Patriots.

== Early life ==
Croston was born in Sergeant Bluff, Iowa, son to Kim and Dave Croston. Dave, a former third round draft pick of the Green Bay Packers in 1987, was a starting offensive tackle and three-year letterman for Hayden Fry's Iowa Hawkeyes in the mid-1980s. Cole later attended Sergeant Bluff-Luton High School.

== College career ==
Croston, who grew up an Iowa fan due to his father's connection with the university, was initially a walk-on for the Hawkeyes. He was a two-year starter and received honorable mention All-Big Ten honors his senior season. He was the 2015 winner of the Next Man In Award on the offensive side of the ball.

== Professional career ==
Pre-draft measurables
Height	Weight	Arm length	Hand span	40-yard dash	10-yard split	20-yard split	20-yard shuttle	Three-cone drill	Vertical jump	Broad jump	Bench press
6 ft 5 1/2 in (1.97 m)	314 lb (142 kg)	34 5/8 in (0.88 m)	9 1/2 in (0.24 m)	5.29 s	1.72 s	3.05 s	4.68 s	7.61 s	32.5 in (0.83 m)	8 ft 7 in (2.62 m)	17 reps
All values from Pro Day

Croston signed with the New England Patriots as an undrafted free agent on May 5, 2017. He made the Patriots 53-man roster as a reserve due to his versatility to play both tackle and guard. He was inactive the first nine games of the season before making his NFL debut in Week 11, coming in at left guard to finish the game in a 33–8 win over the Raiders. The Patriots reached Super Bowl LII and lost 41–33 to the Philadelphia Eagles.

On September 1, 2018, Croston was waived by the Patriots and was signed to the practice squad the next day. He was promoted to the active roster on September 15. Croston was waived on November 6, and was re-signed to the practice squad. Croston was a part of the Patriots Super Bowl LIII winning team when they defeated the Los Angeles Rams 13–3. He signed a reserve/future contract with the Patriots on February 5, 2019.

On July 30, 2019, Croston was waived by the Patriots, but was re-signed on August 12. He was released again during final roster cuts on August 31.
