= Grinspoon (surname) =

Grinspoon is a surname. Notable people with the surname include:

- David Grinspoon (born 1959), American astrobiologist
- Harold Grinspoon (born 1929), American philanthropist
- Lester Grinspoon (1928–2020), American psychiatrist
- Peter Grinspoon (born 1966), American physician
