= Lou Cove =

American writer, speaker, and fundraising advisor

Lou Cove is an American writer, speaker, and fundraising advisor. He is the author of memoir Man of the Year and has raised more than $70 million, mostly for Jewish causes.

Cove's 2017 memoir, Man Of The Year, was published by Flatiron Books. The book chronicles Cove's coming-of-age in Salem, Massachusetts and his adventures with family friend Howie Gordon, an actor and male centerfold vying to become Playgirl Magazine’s "Man of the Year" for 1979.

He served as executive director of Reboot, a network of young Jewish creatives devoted to “rebooting” modern Jewish culture; Vice President of the National Yiddish Book Center; and trustee and senior advisor at the Harold Grinspoon Foundation where he helped create the PJ Library Alliance. Cove has developed a series of reports on Jewish arts & culture in partnership with Steven Spielberg's Righteous Persons Foundation and the Jewish Funders Network.
