= Assaf Swissa =

American entrepreneur

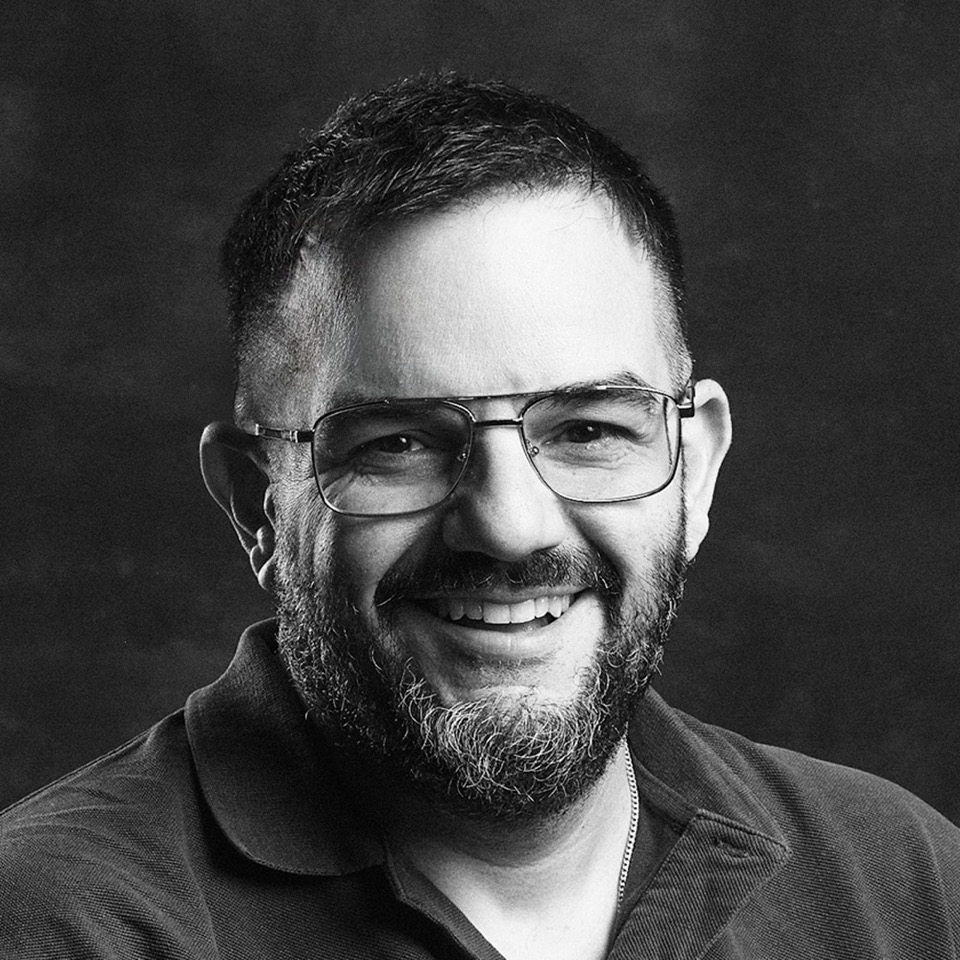
- Born: 1981 (age 44–45); Boston, Massachusetts
- Education: Boston University
- Occupation: Entrepreneur
- Known for: Superdigital, Nuthouse Sports & Unreal Brands
- Website: assafswissa.com

Assaf Swissa (born 1981) is an American entrepreneur, the founder and creative director of the advertising agency Superdigital and the co-founder of entertainment studio Nuthouse Sports and food brand Unreal Brands.

== Early life and education ==
Swissa grew up in Boston, Massachusetts, and earned a bachelor's degree in English from Boston University in 2005.

== Career ==
In 2010, Swissa cofounded Unreal Brands, which aimed to recreate "all-natural" versions of popular candy bars, like Snickers. In 2025, Swissa invested in Unicorn, a hybrid content studio and talent management firm, launched by former executives from Doing Things Media and BuzzFeed.

=== Superdigital ===
In 2013, Swissa founded Superdigital, a creative advertising agency that has worked with Microsoft, Xbox, Hasbro, Dunkin’, and others. Superdigital's work includes influencer talent such as Guy Fieri, Steph Curry, Diplo, and Klay Thompson.

In 2015, Swissa won an Emmy Award for writing shortform for the Julian Edelman Draft Report, entitled "Only Two Things You Can Do," which was produced for private coaching company CoachUp.

In 2020, American professional football player Julian Edelman and Swissa collaborated via Superdigital with American toy company Hasbro on "NERF House," a viral web series released on YouTube, that parodied reality television and content houses. The series featured NFL stars, like Joe Burrow, JuJu Smith-Schuster, Edelman and Christian McCaffrey, shooting Nerf darts at each other in the house. While in that role, in 2024, Swissa was selected for Campaign US’ 40 over 40.

In August 2025, management consulting company Accenture acquired Superdigital. The agency became a part of Accenture Song, Accenture's marketing division, and was acquired to meet client demand creator marketing.

In 2026, Julian Edelman filed a lawsuit against Swissa in Massachusetts.

=== Nuthouse Sports ===
Swissa founded Coast Productions with Edelman in 2017, a media company focused on sports content. Coast produces the sports history podcast Games with Names, hosted by Edelman. In 2019, Swissa produced and wrote the Showtime documentary 100%, which chronicled Edelman's journey from a career-threatening injury to his Super Bowl LIII MVP performance. 100% is narrated by Michael Rappaport and features appearances by Bill Burr, Tom Brady, Snoop Dogg, Mark Wahlberg, and Guy Fieri.

In October 2024, Rob Gronkwoski joined Coast Productions as a partner and launched the Dudes on Dudes podcast, which he hosts with Edelman. That month, the company changed its name to Nuthouse Sports.

== Advocacy ==
Swissa and Edelman spend time combating antisemitism by creating content that promotes positive representations of Jewish culture, a practice they refer to as "pro-semitism." In 2023, Swissa penned an editorial for entertainment trade magazine Variety about the practice, explaining that he prefers highlighting "Jewish ideals, culture, people, values and traits" to simply combatting antisemitism, which he argued is already done by other organizations. He lauded depictions of Jews in movies, like Bradley Cooper in Maestro and argued that the outrage on “Jewface” in the movie was misplaced.

In 2016, Swissa co-wrote Flying High, a children's book, with Julian Edelman, the former New England Patriots player. The book was published by Superdigital. The book notably contains a famous epigraph from Theodor Herzl, broadly considered the father of modern political Zionism, "If you will, it is no dream," in the copy and dedication of the book. In 2017, 25,000 copies of the book were distributed to five-year-olds in Jewish homes in North America through the non-profit PJ Library. A sequel, entitled "Flying High 2" was released that same year, and another book in the series, called "Flying High 3," was released in 2019.
