= Hanna's Sabbath Dress =

- Author: Itzhak Schweiger-Dmi'el
- Illustrator: Ora Eitan
- Genre: Children's picture book
- Publisher: Simon & Schuster Books for Young Readers
- Publication date: 1996
- Pages: 30
- ISBN: 0-689-80517-9
- LC Class: PZ7.S4123 Han 1996

Hanna's Sabbath Dress is a 1996 book by Itzhak Schweiger-Dmi'el. It was first published in Hebrew in 1937.

The story is accompanied by bright and "blocky" illustrations by Ora Eitan.

Hanna's Sabbath Dress has been distributed by PJ Library, a service that sends out Jewish books to families at no cost, on multiple occasions.

== Critical reception ==
The book received several positive reviews. Booklist favored Hanna's Sabbath Dress, writing, "...this simple story, with new illustrations and translation, still has considerable charm." The New York Times Book Review approved of the book, writing, "Fresh, impressionistic gouache artwork accompanies a new translation of a well-loved and quite magical Israeli story." The School Library Journal also recommended the book, saying, "This story, originally written in 1937 but newly translated and illustrated, is a welcome addition." Another positive review was from Horn Book Magazine, which wrote, "the simple story is a perfect example of the moral tale in which a child's act of kindness is rewarded in a mysterious and magical way."
