= Uwingu =

Uwingu is a private, for-profit company founded by Alan Stern, a former NASA associate administrator. The company lets the public nominate names for exoplanets and craters of Mars on Uwingu's new Mars map, in return for a fee. Uwingu’s mission is to create new ways for people to personally connect with space exploration and astronomy. The profits of the company are dedicated to funding space researchers, educators, and projects.

Since launching the Mars Crater Map feature in February, 2014, over 19,000 craters names have been named on the Uwingu Mars Map. Almost $100,000 has been generated for the Uwingu fund space research, education, and exploration. Uwingu Grant Fund recipients include Astronomers Without Borders, The Galileo Teacher Training Program, SEDS, Allen Telescope Array, International Dark-Sky Association and Explore Mars.

Uwingu has also awarded over $15,000 in Student Research Travel Grants in 2014. The selected students, both men and women, completed their PhDs in 2014. Their research topics range from Martian and lunar science, to astrobiology, to the study of planets around other stars. The awarded Uwingu travel grants will enable these students to report their results and further their professional advancement in the scientific community.

On 3 March 2014, the company announced a partnership with Mars One, which is planning on using Uwingu's map of Mars in its mission. It was announced on 12 June 2014 that a second space mission, Time Capsule to Mars, is carrying Uwingu's Mars Map to Mars as well.

== Uwingu Team ==
- Dr. Alan Stern is a planetary scientist and an associate vice president at the Southwest Research Institute, a large non-profit R&D institution with over 3400 employees. He operates a successful private aerospace consulting practice. Formerly, he directed all science programs and missions at NASA headquarters.
- Dr. Henry Throop is an astronomical researcher and an expert in astronomical software and databases. He lives in India.
- Mr. Ryan Johnston has served as president and chief executive of two prominent companies in the entertainment and sports industries for the past ten years. Prior to that, Ryan served 15 years in the U.S. Army’s Aviation Branch. Ryan is a producer of film and television, producer of large-scale events, manager and agent of talent, and the co-founder of a technology company that is testing their products for space travel and everyday commercial use.
- Mr. Doug Griffith is an attorney whose practice in Los Angeles focuses on the aviation and commercial human spaceflight industries. Before Doug became an attorney, he was a Marine aviator, and earned a degree in aerospace engineering from the University of Texas.
- Ms. Alisha McFarland has more than 20 years experience managing and marketing small businesses, and almost a decade of experience in research grant administration.
- Mrs. Ellen Butler helps business owners implement their marketing goals using modern software, social media, email marketing, and other online tools. Ellen graduated from Indiana University.
- Mr. Tom Burton is a web developer and designer who has worked with technology firms across the world.

== Advisors ==
Uwingu’s board of advisors consists of influential thinkers from the astronomy, planetary science, IT, and business worlds:

- Mr. Michael Aisner, promoter and marketing expert
- Mr. Andy Chaikin, space historian and author
- Mr. David J. Eicher, editor, Astronomy magazine
- Mr. Stephen Goldman, computer industry entrepreneur and mathematical physicist
- Dr. David Grinspoon, planetary scientist, author, and educator
- Ms. Cassie Kloberdanz, commercial space advocate
- Mr. Jon Lomberg, space artist and former illustrator for Carl Sagan
- Mr. George Merlis, communications expert and former producer of Good Morning America on ABC TV
- Dr. Cathy Olkin, planetary scientist
- Mr. Rick Rasansky, serial entrepreneur and internet company CEO
- Mr. Robert Richards, co-founder and CEO of Moon Express
- Dr. Teresa Segura, Mars scientist
- Dr. Peter Smith, Mars scientist and principal investigator of NASA’s 2008 Mars Phoenix lander
- Mr. Zak Williams, marketing man, space aficionado

== Criticism ==
The International Astronomical Union has strongly condemned Uwingu, disagreeing charging money to buy planet names, stressing that the IAU was the only official authority on naming astronomical objects. Many people came to the defense of Uwingu and in the end, the IAU retracted their statements. Uwingu denies these accusations, saying it represents the "people's choice" rather than any official position.
