= Steven Grinspoon =

American physician

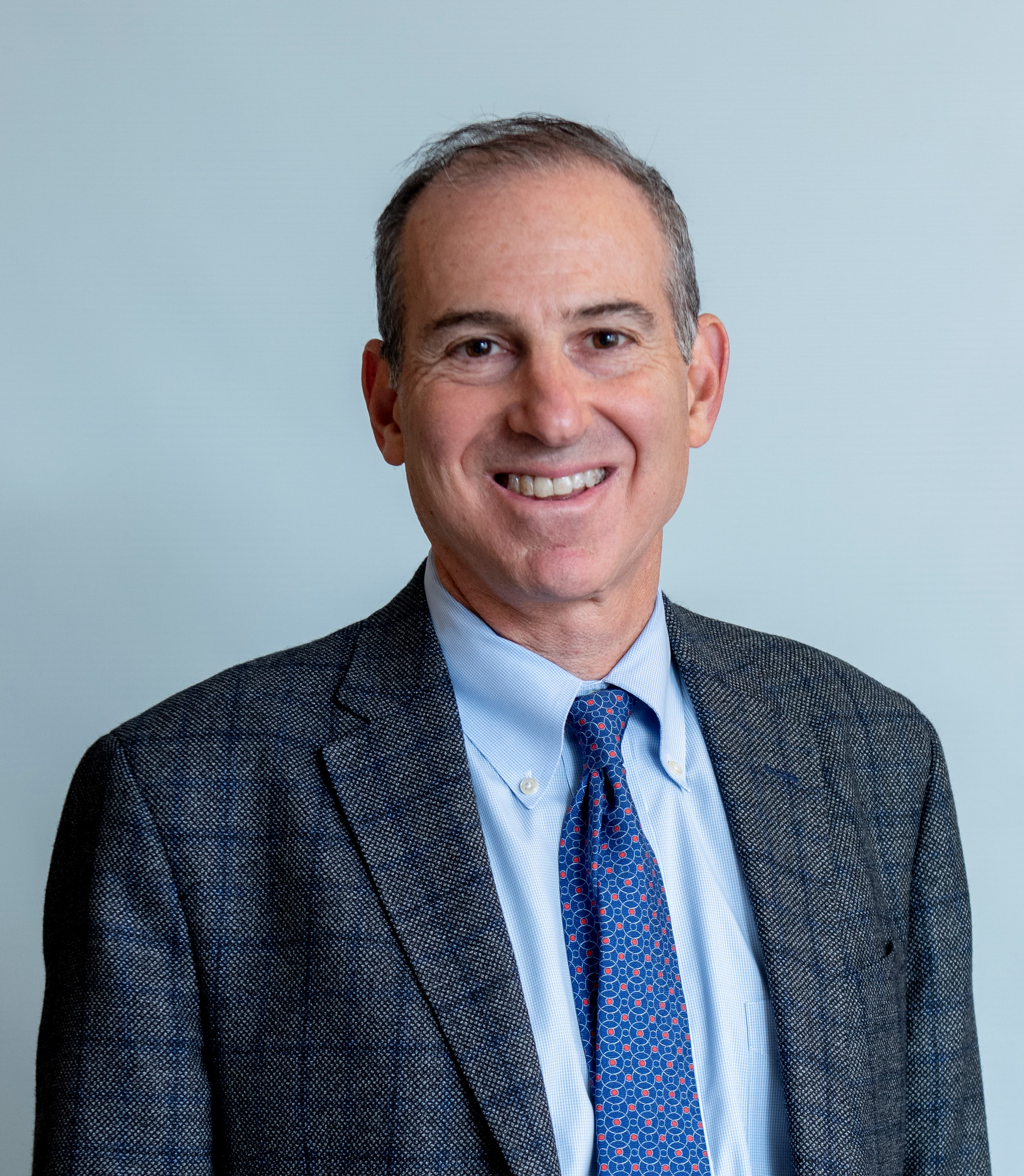
- Education: Cornell University, 1983; University of Rochester School of Medicine, 1988; Medical residency and Chief Resident at Columbia Presbyterian, 1988 -1992; Fellowship at Massachusetts General Hospital, 1992-1995
- Awards: American Society for Clinical Investigation, 2003; Gerald D. Aurbach Laureate Award for Outstanding Translational Research from the Endocrine Society, 2016

Steven Grinspoon is an American physician and a professor of medicine at Harvard Medical School. His work investigates the neuroendocrine regulation of body composition and the physiological consequences of fat distribution on cardiovascular disease and inflammation. In 2015, he became the principal investigator of the NIH-funded Nutrition Obesity Research Center at Harvard.

== Early life ==
Steven Grinspoon is the son of Eileen and Harold Grinspoon, a real estate developer. He graduated from Cornell University in 1983 and attended the University of Rochester School of Medicine, graduating in 1988. He completed his medical residency and was chief resident at Columbia Presbyterian from 1988 to 1992, and then completed his endocrinology fellowship at Massachusetts General Hospital from 1992 to 1995.

== Career ==
Grinspoon is chief of the Massachusetts General Hospital’s (MGH) Metabolism Unit, and Director of the Nutrition and Obesity Research Center at Harvard. He is the MGH Endowed Chair in Neuroendocrinology and Metabolism.

In 2003, he was elected to the American Society for Clinical Investigation. In 2016, he received the Gerald D. Aurbach Laureate Award for Outstanding Translational Research from the Endocrine Society.

== Research ==
Grinspoon’s primary research has been centered on understanding the neuroendocrine regulation of body composition in HIV patients, and how it relates to the growth hormone (GH) axis. Hypothesizing that augmentation of GH pulsatility might reduce visceral fat, Grinspoon led a series of studies demonstrating that that growth-hormone-releasing drug Tesamorelin reduced visceral fat and triglycerides, while improving adiponectin in patients with HIV. Following the trials, the Federal Drug Administration approved Tesamorelin for HIV-associated lipodystrophy in 2010.

Subsequent studies, published in JAMA and Lancet HIV, demonstrated that Tesamorelin reduced hepatic steatosis as well, the first drug to demonstrate a significant effect among patients with HIV lipodystrophy. He demonstrated significant effects in stimulating hepatic oxidative pathways and reduce inflammatory pathways in gene set enrichment studies. Tesamorelin was also studied in individuals with generalized obesity, where it was observed to reduce cIMT, inflammatory markers, lipids, and visceral adiposity.

He investigated the mechanisms and strategies for addressing cardiovascular disease (CVD) in HIV. His work began with epidemiologic studies that demonstrated increased myocardial infarction rates among HIV patients. He identified a higher prevalence of plaque, particularly noncalcified, lipid-rich plaque. He used FDG PET imaging to demonstrate significant arterial inflammation in asymptomatic, low-traditional risk HIV patients. He conducted studies that characterized coronary plaque morphology in HIV patients, revealing an increased prevalence of high-risk plaques with low attenuation and positive remodeling—features that make them more prone to rupture.

Since 2013, he has been leading the REPRIEVE trial, a global primary prevention study conducted across 12 countries. The REPRIEVE trial was recently halted early by its Data Safety Monitoring Board due to a robust efficacy signal, showing that statin therapy reduced major adverse cardiovascular events—including heart attacks, strokes, and cardiovascular deaths—by 35% over five years compared to placebo.

He was among the first to assess metformin and rosiglitazone to reverse insulin resistance and increase adipogenesis in this population. He recognized reduced DICER as a factor that may contribute to dysfunctional adipose tissue in HIV.

He was granted a US Patent entitled “GHRH or Analogues Thereof for the Use in Treatment of Hepatic Disease."

== Personal life ==
He married Winifred Ann Sandler in 1988. They have three children together.

== Works ==
- Grinspoon, Steven K. (April 2003). "Weight loss and wasting in patients infected with human immunodeficiency virus.” Clinical Infectious Diseases 36 (69-78).
- Grinspoon, Steven K. (19 June 2008). “Initiative to Decrease Cardiovascular Risk and Increase Quality of Care for Patients Living With HIV/AIDS”.Circulation (journal) 18
- Grinspoon, Steven K.; Lake, Jordan, Stanley, Takara; Apovian, Caroline; Brown, Todd. (15 May 2017). “Practical Review of Recognition and Management of Obesity and Lipohypertrophy in Human Immunodeficiency Virus Infection”. Clinical Infectious Diseases 64 (1422–1429).
- Grinspoon, Steven K; Brown, Todd T. (2020) Williams Textbook of Endocrinology:”Endocrinology of HIV/AIDS”. Elsevier.
- Grinspoon, Steven K; Stlanley, Takara L. (January 2022) Oxford Textbook of Endocrinology and Diabetes: “Abnormalities in HIV Infection”. Oxford University Press.
- Grinspoon, Steven K; Zanni, Markella V.; Fitchenbaum, Carl J. (July 23, 2023) New England Journal of Medicine: “Pitavastatin to Prevent Cardiovascular Disease in HIV Infection”. Massachusetts Medical Society.
