= Alan Stern =

American engineer and planetary scientist (born 1957)

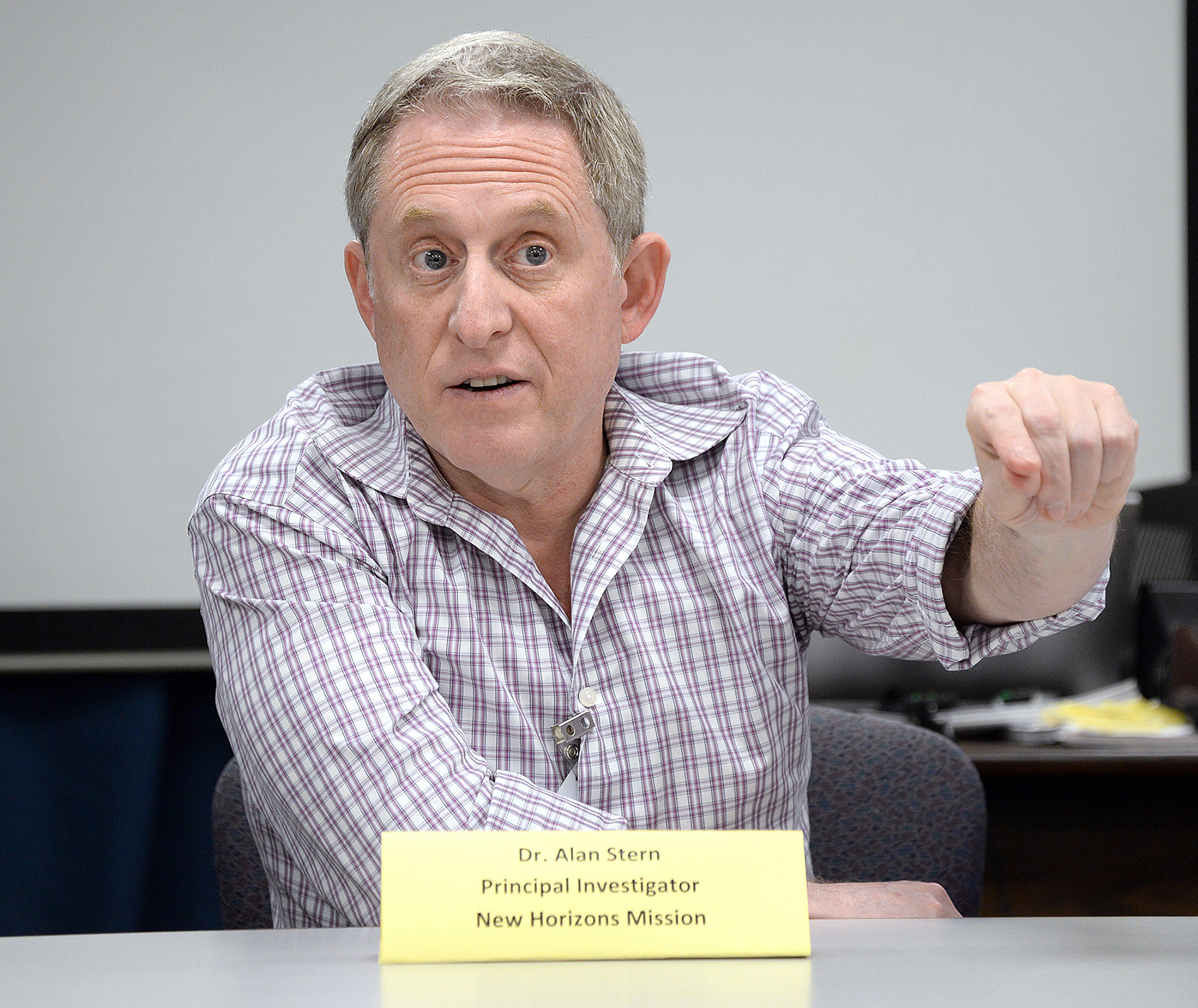
- Stern in 2017
- Born: Sol Alan Stern; November 22, 1957 (age 68); New Orleans, Louisiana, U.S.
- Education: University of Texas, Austin; University of Colorado, Boulder
- Known for: New Horizons, Exploration of Pluto, Galactic 05
- Awards: Nature's 10 (2015); Carl Sagan Memorial Award (2016)
- Scientific career
- Fields: Astrophysics; Aerospace engineering Planetary science
- Workplaces: NASA; Southwest Research Institute

Sol Alan Stern (born November 22, 1957) is an American engineer, planetary scientist and private astronaut. He is the principal investigator of the New Horizons mission to Pluto and the Chief Scientist at Moon Express.

Stern has been involved in 24 suborbital, orbital, and planetary space missions, including eight for which he was the mission principal investigator. One of his projects was the Southwest Ultraviolet Imaging System, an instrument which flew on two space shuttle missions, STS-85 in 1997 and STS-93 in 1999.

Stern has also developed eight scientific instruments for planetary and near-space research missions and has been a guest observer on numerous NASA satellite observatories, including the International Ultraviolet Explorer, the Hubble Space Telescope, the International Infrared Observer and the Extreme Ultraviolet Observer. Stern was executive director of the Southwest Research Institute's Space Science and Engineering Division until becoming Associate Administrator of NASA's Science Mission Directorate in 2007. He resigned from that position after nearly a year.

His research has focused on studies of our solar system's Kuiper belt and Oort cloud, comets, the satellites of the outer planets, Pluto, and the search for evidence of planetary systems around other stars. He has also worked on spacecraft rendezvous theory, terrestrial polar mesospheric clouds, galactic astrophysics, and studies of tenuous satellite atmospheres, including the atmosphere of the Moon.

== Life and career ==
Stern was born in New Orleans, Louisiana to Jewish parents Joel and Leonard Stern. He graduated from St. Mark's School of Texas in 1975. He then attended the University of Texas, Austin, where he received his bachelor's degrees in physics & astronomy and his master's degrees in aerospace engineering and planetary atmospheres. He earned a doctorate in astrophysics and planetary science from the University of Colorado, Boulder.

From 1983 to 1991, Stern held positions at the University of Colorado in the Center for Space and Geoscience Policy, the office of the vice president for Research, and the Center for Astrophysics and Space Astronomy. He received his doctorate in 1989. From 1991 to 1994 he was the leader of Southwest Research Institute's Astrophysical and Planetary Sciences group and was chair of NASA's Outer Planets Science Working Group. From 1994 to 1998 he was the leader of the Geophysical, Astrophysical, and Planetary Science section in Southwest Research Institute's Space Sciences Department, and from 1998 to 2005 he was the director of the Department of Space Studies at Southwest Research Institute. In 1995 he was selected to be a Space Shuttle mission specialist finalist, and in 1996 he was a candidate Space Shuttle payload specialist but did not have the opportunity to fly on the Space Shuttle.

In 2007, Stern was listed among Time magazine's 100 Most Influential People in The World.

On August 27, 2008, Stern was elected to the board of directors of the Challenger Center for Space Science Education.

In 2015, Stern was the recipient of Smithsonian Magazine's American Ingenuity Award in the Physical Sciences category.

On October 7, 2016, Stern was inducted into the Colorado Space Hall of Fame.

=== Inspiration for Pluto/Kuiper belt mission ===
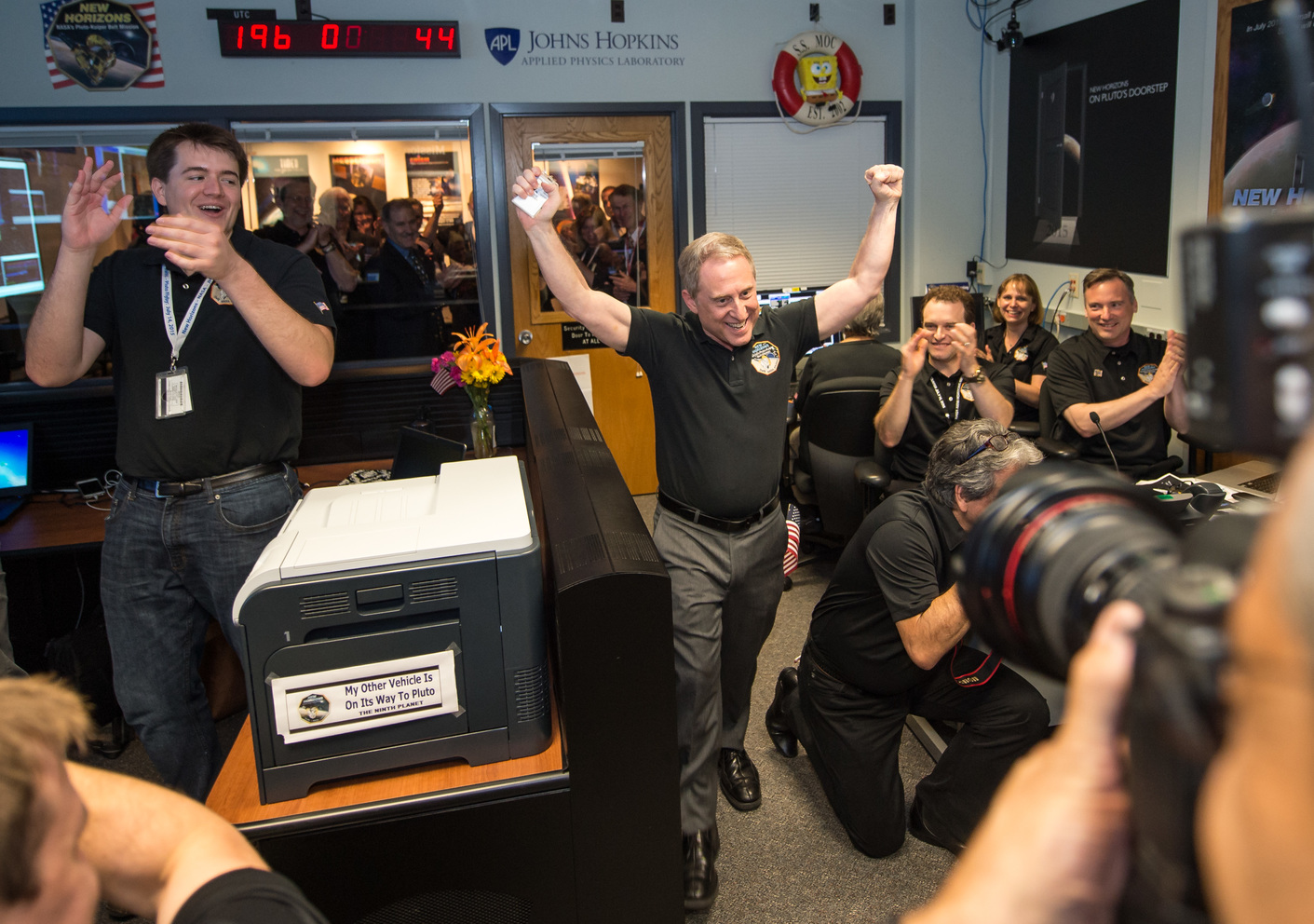
Alan Stern and the New Horizons team celebrate after the spacecraft successfully completed its flyby of Pluto.

On June 14, 2007, in an address to the Smithsonian Institution for their "Exploring the Solar System Lecture Series", Stern commented on the New Horizons mission:

I recall going to JPL, the Jet Propulsion Lab, the summer of 1989 when I was in graduate school to take a summer course in planetary exploration at Caltech and this was the summer of the Voyager fly-by of Neptune and Triton (which has turned out to be rather a twin of Pluto). It was amazing to get to be a part of some first-time exploration like that! Within a matter of months, a small group of us had formed a team, an advocacy group, Why don't we get a mission together for Pluto?

=== Private sector experience ===
After completing a master's degree in aerospace engineering Stern spent seven years as an aerospace systems engineer, concentrating on spacecraft and payload systems at the NASA Johnson Space Center, Martin Marietta Aerospace, and the Laboratory for Atmospheric and Space Physics at the University of Colorado.

Stern is currently active as a consultant for private sector space efforts and has stated:

I am a fan of public-private partnerships and building bridges to new markets, I believe we are on the verge of a whole new era of space exploration and that the private sector can provide reliable cost effective services that can increase the value and leverage government space budgets.

On June 18, 2008, Stern joined Odyssey Moon Limited (Isle of Man), a private industry effort, as a part-time Science Mission Director/consultant in their efforts to launch a robotic mission to the Earth's Moon by participating in the $30 Million Google Lunar X-Prize competition.

In December 2008, Stern joined Blue Origin, a company that was founded by Amazon.com's Jeff Bezos as an independent representative for research and education missions. The company has stated that its objective is to develop a new vertical-take-off, vertical-landing vehicle known as New Shepard that is designed to take a small number of astronauts on a sub-orbital journey into space and reduce the cost of space transportation. The company is located in Kent, Washington and has flight tested some hardware.

In 2012, Stern co-founded Uwingu.

== Space science mission ==
Stern has experience in instrument development, concentrating on ultraviolet technologies. Stern is a principal investigator (PI) in NASA's UV sounding rocket program, and was the project scientist on a Shuttle-deployable SPARTAN astronomical satellite. He was the PI of the advanced, miniaturized HIPPS Pluto breadboard camera/IR spectrometer/UV spectrometer payload for the NASA/Pluto-Kuiper Express mission, and he is the PI of the PERSI imager/spectrometer payload on NASA's New Horizons Pluto mission. Stern is also the PI of the ALI CE UV Spectrometer for the ESA/NASA Rosetta comet orbiter. He was a member of the New Millennium Deep Space 1 (DS1) mission science team, and is a Co-investigator on both the ESA SPICAM Mars UV spectrometer launched on Mars Express, and the Hubble Space Telescope Cosmic Origins Spectrograph (COS) installed in 2009. He is the PI of the SWUIS ultraviolet imager, which has flown two Shuttle missions, and the SWUIS-A airborne astronomical facility. In this capacity, Stern has flown numerous WB-57 and F-18 airborne research astronomy missions. Stern and his colleague, Dr. Daniel Durda, have been flying on the modified F/A-18 Hornet with a sophisticated camera system called the Southwest Ultraviolet Imaging System (SWUIS). They use the camera to search for a hypothetical group of asteroids (Vulcanoids) between the orbit of Mercury and the Sun that are so elusive and hard to see that scientists are not sure they exist.

== NASA experience ==
Stern has served on various NASA committees, including the Lunar Exploration Science Working Group (LExSWG) and the Discovery Program Science Working Group (DPSWG), the Solar System Exploration Subcommittee (SSES), the New Millennium Science Working Group (NMSWG), and the Sounding Rocket Working Group (SRWG). He was Chair of NASA's Outer Planets Science Working Group (OPSWG) from 1991 to 1994 and served as a panel member for the National Research Council's 2003-2013 Decadal Survey on planetary science. Stern is a member of the AAAS, the AAS, and the AGU.

== NASA Associate Administrator ==
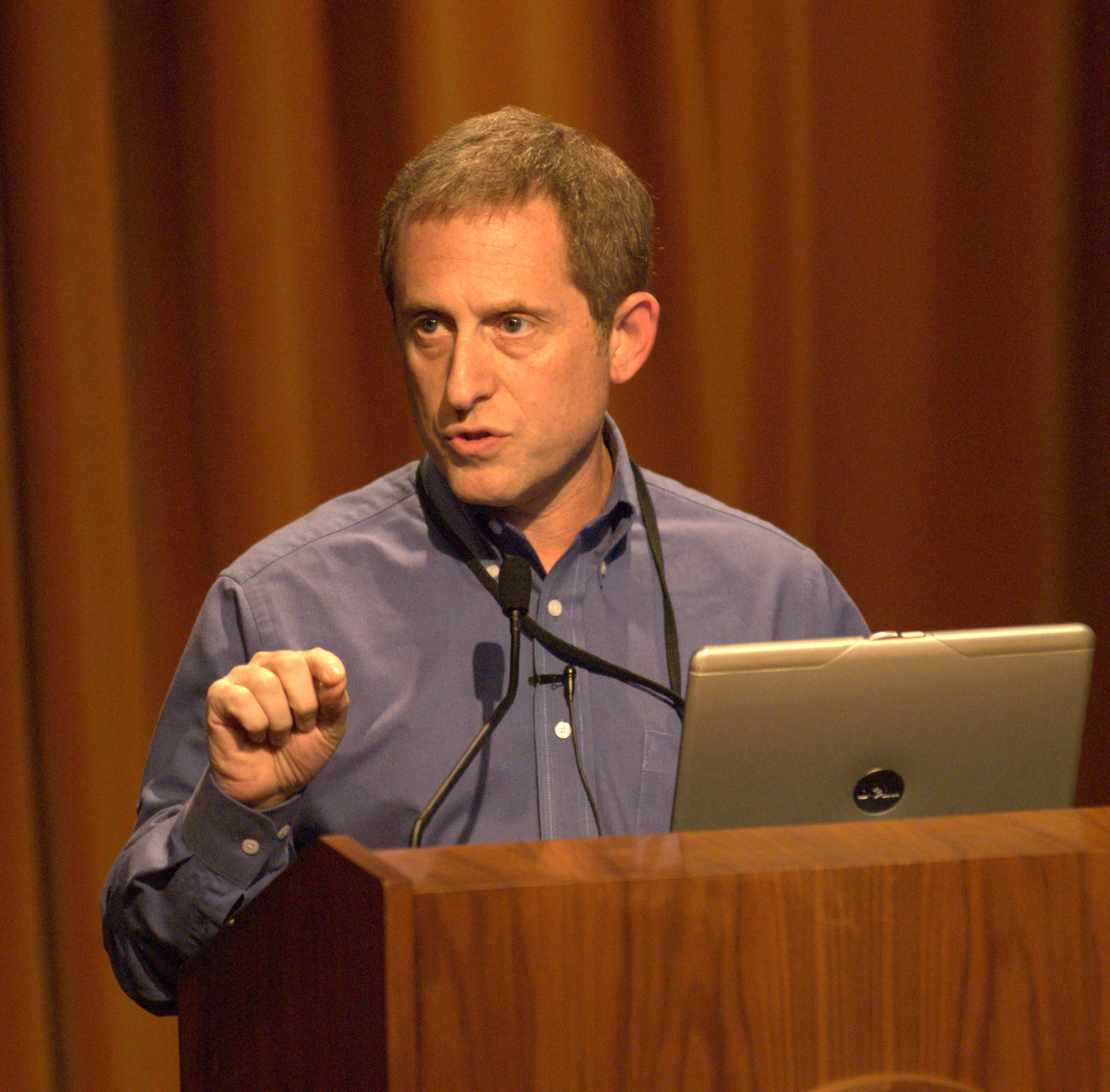
Stern speaking at Ames Research Center in 2007 as NASA Associate Administrator

Stern was appointed NASA's Associate Administrator for the Science Mission Directorate, essentially NASA's top-ranking official for science, in April 2007. In this position Stern directed a US$4.4 billion organization with 93 separate flight missions and a program of over 3,000 research grants. During his tenure a record 10 major new flight projects were started and deep reforms of the research and also the education and public outreach programs were put in place. Stern's style was characterised as "hard-charging" as he pursued a reform-minded agenda. He "made headlines for trying to keep agency missions on schedule and under budget" but faced "internal battles over funding". He was credited with making "significant changes that have helped restore the importance of science in NASA's mission".

On March 26, 2008, it was announced that Stern had resigned his position the previous day, effective April 11. He was replaced by Ed Weiler, who was to serve his second stint in the position. The resignation occurred on the same day that NASA Chief Michael D. Griffin overruled a decrease in funding for the Mars Exploration Rovers and Mars Odyssey missions that was intended to free up funds needed for the upcoming Mars Science Laboratory. NASA officials would neither confirm nor deny a connection between the two events.

Stern left to avoid cutting healthy programs and basic research in order to cover cost overruns. He believed that cost overruns in the Mars program should be accommodated from within the Mars program, and not taken from other NASA programs. Michael D. Griffin became upset with Stern for making major decisions without consulting him, while Stern was frustrated by Griffin's refusal to allow him to cut or delay politically sensitive projects. Griffin favored cutting "less popular parts" of the budget, including basic research, and Stern's refusal to do so led to his resignation.

Casting doubt on the theory that Stern resigned due to conflict with former Administrator Griffin is his statement of March 25, 2009 at spacepolitics.com:

One more fact: I did not quit over MER; in fact, I wasn't the person who tried to cut MER... I quit when my boss effectively told me he was taking over SMD to fund MSL no matter how much damage it did to the rest of SMD. Now, a year later, you can see that damage as canceled SMEX missions, long delayed New Frontiers and Discovery AOs, the effective end of MSR, and an outer planets flagship that is 3+ years later now than when I left, just 12 months ago. I am quite comfortable with my decision to leave, rather than eviscerate innocent SMD missions that should have proceeded apace...

On November 23, 2008, in an op-ed in The New York Times, Stern criticized NASA's inability to keep its spending under control. Stern said that, during his own time at NASA, "when I articulated this problem... and consistently curtailed cost increases, I found myself eventually admonished and then neutered by still higher ups, precipitating my resignation earlier this year." While complimenting NASA Administrator Michael D. Griffin, Stern suggested that Griffin's decision to again bail out an over-budget mission was motivated by fear "that any move to cancel the Mars mission would be rebuffed by members of Congress protecting local jobs."

Since leaving NASA, Stern has made criticisms of the budgetary process and has advocated for revamping its public appeal.

== Planetary classification ==
Stern has become involved in the debate surrounding the 2006 definition of planet by the IAU. After the IAU's decision was made he was quoted as saying "It's an awful definition; it's sloppy science and it would never pass peer review" and claimed that Earth, Mars, Jupiter and Neptune have not fully cleared their orbital zones and has stated in his capacity as PI of the New Horizons project that "The New Horizons project [...] will not recognize the IAU's planet definition resolution of August 24, 2006."

A 2000 paper by Stern and Levison proposed a system of planet classification that included both the concepts of hydrostatic equilibrium and clearing the neighbourhood used in the new definition, with a proposed classification scheme labeling all sub-stellar objects in hydrostatic equilibrium as "planets" and subclassifying them into "überplanets" and "unterplanets" based on a mathematical analysis of the planet's ability to scatter other objects out of its orbit over a long period of time. Mercury, Venus, Earth, Mars, Jupiter, Saturn, Uranus and Neptune were classified as neighborhood-clearing "überplanets" and Pluto was classified as an "unterplanet".

=== Satellite planets and belt planets ===
Some large satellites are of similar size or larger than the planet Mercury, e.g. Jupiter's Galilean moons and Titan. Stern has argued that location should not matter and only geophysical attributes should be taken into account in the definition of a planet, and proposes the term satellite planet for a planet-sized object orbiting another planet. Likewise planet-sized objects in the asteroid belt or Kuiper belt should also be planets according to Stern. Others have used the neologism planemo (planetary-mass object) for the broad concept of "planet" advocated by Stern.

== Selected bibliography ==
- Stern, S. Alan (1987). The U.S. Space Program After Challenger. New York: Franklin-Watts. ISBN 0-531-10412-5.
- Stern, S. Alan, ed. (1998). Our Worlds: The Magnetism and Thrill of Planetary Exploration. Cambridge University Press. ISBN 0-521-63164-5.
- Stern, S. Alan, ed. (2000). Our Universe. Cambridge University Press.
- Stern, S. Alan, ed. (2003). Worlds Beyond: The Thrill of Planetary Exploration as told by Leading Experts. Cambridge University Press. ISBN 0-521-52001-0.
- Stern, S. Alan (April 2013). "The low-cost ticket to space". Space Exploration. Scientific American. 308 (4): 50–55. Bibcode:2013SciAm.308d..68S. doi:10.1038/scientificamerican0413-68. PMID 23539792.
- Stern, S. Alan; Mitton, Jacqueline (2005) [1997]. Pluto and Charon: Ice Worlds on the Ragged Edge of the Solar System. John Wiley and Sons. ISBN 3-527-40556-9.
- Stern, Alan; Grinspoon, David (2018). Chasing New Horizons: Inside the Epic First Mission to Pluto. Picador. ISBN 978-1-2500-9896-2.
- Stern, S. Alan (August 10, 2021). The Pluto System After New Horizons. University of Arizona Press. p. 688. ISBN 978-0816540945.
