= Chasing New Horizons =

2018 book by Alan Stern and David Grinspoon

- Author: Alan Stern, David Grinspoon
- Language: English
- Subject: New Horizons mission, Pluto exploration
- Genre: Non-fiction
- Published: 2018
- Publisher: Macmillan Publishers
- Publication place: US
- Media type: Hardcover, paperback, ebook, audio
- Pages: 320
- ISBN: 978-1250098962
- Website: https://alanstern.space/chasing-new-horizons/

Chasing New Horizons: Inside the Epic First Mission to Pluto is a book by American planetary scientist Alan Stern and astrobiologist and non-fiction writer David Grinspoon, published in 2018. Grinspoon acts as a narrator, though the book is written from Alan Stern's perspective; he is the principal investigator of New Horizons mission to Pluto.

== Background and reception ==
The book tells a story of a space probe to Pluto, that was proposed by the author, Alan Stern, in the early 1990s. The mission had been cancelled several times, and there were a harsh competition between Stern's group and that of JPL to get approval of the mission design from NASA.

Kirkus reviews called the book "an exploration of the fascinating science and complex bureaucracy behind the first journey to Pluto", and pointed that the authors "deliver a meticulously detailed, riveting chronicle of America’s history-making mission to Pluto, escorting readers through the immense hurdles and hard work involved in the landmark mission." Another review praised the book saying that "Stern and Grinspoon recreate the mission’s highs and lows in a compulsively readable tale. In the hands of less gifted storytellers, much of the early years— the internal competition for funds, a feud with Jet Propulsion Laboratory, NASA’s alternating red and green lights—would have been tedious. But Stern and Grinspoon skillfully tease out the drama, with vivid portraits of the young scientists and engineers who were willing to stake their careers on challenges straight out of a Star Wars film". Review by the Wall Street Journal juxtaposed public awareness of a photos made by the probe and of a team behind it. "The image captured a bright white region on Pluto's surface in the shape of a heart, "creating an emotional attachment for this small, previously indistinct planet at the edge of our planetary system," write Alan Stern and David Grinspoon in their riveting account Chasing New Horizons. Many are still unaware of the 2,500 people that it took to snap that picture—as well as the many years of waiting."

Louisa Preston noted in a review for the Physics World that the book "reads like a novel", but also noted that it is biased in favor of Stern:

What follows next however is the story of decades of disappointment and a real insight into how hard it is to get any space mission off the ground. Going into this part of the book, I thought I would be a bit bored – who really wants to read about funding wars and academic rivalries? Well, it turns out that I do. The narrative of this part of the story is incredibly emotive and almost exciting. Grinspoon portrays NASA’s Jet Propulsion Laboratory staff as the villains – trying to control and influence a project that was never theirs to begin with. His obviously biased view positions Stern as the hero – a veritable rebel fighting "the establishment".

Despite this, her review is positive, and she said that "book is really Grinspoon and Stern’s chance to pay homage to the thousands of people who played a part in making this mission a success."

Virgil Adumitroaie in a review for AIAA Journal was impressed how "The authors' passion for space exploration transpires equally in doom and gloom or elating situations and is only surpassed by their indestructible optimism."
