= Harold Grinspoon =

American real estate developer (born 1929)

- Born: July 27, 1929 (age 97); Newton, Massachusetts, U.S.
- Occupations: Real estate developer, philanthropist
- Known for: Philanthropy
- Spouse: Diane Troderman
- Children: Steven Grinspoon, Jeffrey, Alissa
- Relatives: Lester Grinspoon (brother); Peter Grinspoon (nephew); David Grinspoon (nephew)
- Website: https://hgf.org/

Harold Grinspoon (born July 27, 1929) is an American real estate developer and philanthropist. He is the founder of Aspen Square Management, but is perhaps even more widely known for his philanthropic flagship PJ Library. In 2015, Grinspoon and his wife Diane Troderman signed The Giving Pledge, to dedicate at least 50% of their wealth to philanthropy.

== Early life ==
Grinspoon grew up in the Auburndale section of Newton, Massachusetts. He is the son of Simon Grinspoon and Sally Rose, first and second-generation Jewish immigrants from Russia, one of five children, including Martin, Lenore, Lester Grinspoon, and Kenneth.

After graduating high school, Grinspoon attended Marlboro College in Vermont, though he never graduated. To pay for tuition, he spent his summers working on an ice cream truck. His first entrepreneurial pursuit was at Marlboro; he purchased a used Maytag washer, and operated a coin-operated laundry machine in the basement of the college. He left Marlboro after 2 ½ years at the age of 21 to manage a fleet of ice cream trucks for Howard Johnson's, but was soon drafted into active duty in the Navy.

== Real estate business ==
In 1959, Grinspoon purchased his first two-family rental property in Agawam, Massachusetts. Subsequently, he founded the business that would one day become Aspen Square Management, currently one of the top 50 privately held national real estate firms. As the business grew, Grinspoon brought in more partners. Aspen Square Management is now made up of more than 15,000 rental apartments across 16 states.

== Philanthropy ==
At age 59, Grinspoon was diagnosed with cancer of the tongue. It was at this point in his life Grinspoon came to realize that creating wealth alone was not enough, and he vowed to find a higher purpose.

Not long after, in 1991, he and his wife created the Harold Grinspoon Foundation. The HGF began as a small foundation focused on the local Jewish community in western Massachusetts. PJ Library, however, soon emerged as a program with a life of its own. Modeled after Dolly Parton's "Imagination Library", but with a Jewish focus, PJ Library is designed to engage parents with their children each night at bedtime with a free book that illustrates various aspects of Jewish traditions and history. Together with worldwide partners, PJ Library presents over 650,000 free books each month to children across 40+ countries, on six continents, in seven languages. Additionally, companion programs Sifrayit Pijama ("Pajama Library") is a household name for more than 350,000 Israeli Jewish children growing up on the vibrant Hebrew Language books, and Maktabat al-Fanoos ("Lantern Library") brings culturally appropriate books in Arabic to 170,000 Israeli Arab children. PJ Library is just one program within the Harold Grinspoon Foundation, created by Grinspoon and his wife Diane Troderman in 1991 with a mission to use Grinspoon's considerable wealth to enhance Jewish and community life in Western Massachusetts and around the world.

The foundation's many other programs include funding and professional development for non-profit Jewish summer camps through "J-Camp 180", and tuition incentive grants for families with children attending participating local schools. Through HGF's "Life & Legacy" program that encourages future giving in wills and estate planning, Jewish communities around the country have raised a billion dollars to date. Meanwhile, Grinspoon's Charitable Foundation focuses on supporting and acknowledging outstanding teachers, helping farmers with capital improvements, and encouraging entrepreneurship, as well as promoting climate education in MA schools and, since 2024, nationally through his free book series The Energy Detectives. The HGF continues to grow and expand under the leadership of its President, Grinspoon's daughter in law, Winnie Sandler Grinspoon.

== Artwork ==
In his mid 80s, Grinspoon began a third career as an artist. The inspiration came to him by accident, when a large cherry tree fell in his backyard in Longmeadow, Massachusetts. Moved by its form and shape, instead of having it taken away, he decided to make it into something lasting and beautiful. The result was a 25-foot outdoor sculpture. In the years since, he has created over a hundred sculptures, many installed in public spaces across Massachusetts and nationally.

== Juried sculpture exhibitions ==
- Sculpture at the Mount, The Mount (Lenox, Massachusetts) Jun. 2 through Oct. 2024
- SculptureNow, The Mount (Lenox, Massachusetts) Jun. 1 – Oct. 21, 2023
- Land of Enchantment, The Norman Rockwell Museum Stockbridge, MA, Jul, 10 - Oct. 31, 2021
- SculptureNow, The Mount (Lenox, Massachusetts) Jul, 10 - Oct. 13, 2021
- Art in the Orchard: The 6th Biennial, Park Hill Orchard, Easthampton, MA, 2021
- Interludes - Art in the Park Biennial, Worcester, MA, 2019
- A Celebration of Sculpture, Jewish Community Center of Tucson, AZ, 2019
- Cross Town Contemporary Art, University Museum of Contemporary Art, Amherst, MA, 2018
- SculptureNow, The Mount (Lenox, Massachusetts), 2018
- Art in the Orchard, Park Hill Orchard, Easthampton, MA, 2018
- SculptureNow, The Mount (Lenox, Massachusetts), 2017

== Solo exhibitions ==
- Harold Grinspoon: Sculptures, Museum of Science (Boston), 2023
- Harold Grinspoon: Amber Globes, EcoTarium, 2022-present
- Harold Grinspoon: Sculptures, The Stevens–Coolidge Place, 2022
- Harold Grinspoon: Sculptures, Look Park, 2021, 2022-present
- Harold Grinspoon: Sculptures, The Eastern States Exposition, 2018, 2021 – present
