= Lester Grinspoon =

American psychiatrist (1928–2020)

- Born: June 24, 1928; Newton, Massachusetts, U.S.
- Died: June 25, 2020 (aged 92); Newton, Massachusetts, U.S.
- Education: Tufts University (BA); Harvard Medical School (MD)
- Children: 4, including David and Peter
- Relatives: Harold Grinspoon (brother)
- Scientific career
- Workplaces: Harvard Medical School

Lester Grinspoon (June 24, 1928 – June 25, 2020) was an American psychiatrist and associate professor of psychiatry at Harvard University, best known for his work on the science and social policy of cannabis, psychedelics and other drugs, prompting his ensuing commitment to the reformation of drug policies. He concurrently served as a senior psychiatrist at the Massachusetts Mental Health Center for 40 years. Grinspoon was a fellow of the American Association for the Advancement of Science and the American Psychiatric Association. He was founding editor of The American Psychiatric Association Annual Review and Harvard Mental Health Letter. Grinspoon was editor of Harvard Mental Health Letter for fifteen years.

== Biography ==
=== Personal life ===
Grinspoon was born June 24, 1928, in Newton, Massachusetts, the son of Sally and Simon Grinspoon. His family was of Russian Jewish descent. After dropping out of high school, Grinspoon worked as a merchant mariner before resuming his education at Tufts University, earning an undergraduate degree in chemistry in 1951. He then enrolled at Harvard Medical School, where he received his Doctor of Medicine degree in 1955. He was married and the father of four children, including astrobiologist David Grinspoon and physician and author Peter Grinspoon. His oldest son died of cancer when he was 15. In 2011, he revealed that he had cancer during the documentary Clearing the Smoke: The Science of Cannabis. Throughout his career, he maintained a close friendship with science popularizer and onetime Harvard colleague Carl Sagan, who was surreptitiously depicted as "Mr. X" in Grinspoon's groundbreaking book Marihuana Reconsidered; following its release, the book appeared on the front page of the New York Times Book Review.

Lester Grinspoon died in Newton on June 25, 2020, one day after his 92nd birthday.

=== Cannabis research ===
Grinspoon became interested in cannabis in the 1960s when its use in the United States increased dramatically. He "had no doubt that it was a very harmful drug that was unfortunately being used by more and more foolish young people who would not listen to or could not believe or understand the warnings about its dangers". When Grinspoon began studying marijuana in 1967, his intention was to "define scientifically the nature and degree of those dangers" but as he reviewed the existing literature on the subject Grinspoon reached the conclusion he and the general public had been misinformed and misled. "There was little empirical evidence to support my beliefs about the dangers of marihuana [sic]", and he was convinced cannabis was much less harmful than he had believed. The title of Marihuana Reconsidered "reflected that change in view". He has testified before Congress, and as an expert witness in various legal proceedings, including the deportation hearings of John Lennon.

In 1990 Grinspoon won the Alfred R. Lindesmith Award for Achievement in the Field of Scholarship from the Drug Policy Foundation. The award is now given by the Drug Policy Alliance, which was formed in the year 2000 by a merger of the Drug Policy Foundation and The Lindesmith Center. Grinspoon endorsed Washington Initiative 1068 (2010) in May 2010.

=== Promotion attempts ===
Despite "a career that included pioneering research on schizophrenia, dozens of books and papers, and leadership roles at the Massachusetts Mental Health Center and other prestigious institutions," Grinspoon was denied promotion to full professor in 1975 and 1997. Grinspoon's allies believe "an undercurrent of unscientific prejudice against cannabis among [Harvard] faculty and school leaders doomed his chances"; in 1975, a dean confided to him that the promotions committee "hated" Marihuana Reconsidered because it was "too controversial." Dan Adams of The Boston Globe has characterized Grinspoon as "no Timothy Leary [...] He was an earnest academic who wore a tie, and insisted he never promoted the use of marijuana, but rather the elimination of draconian prohibitions."

Former colleagues Ming Tsuang and Joseph Coyle have maintained that the denial of Grinspoon's promotion was likely predicated on his perceived neglect of "original research" in favor of "[synthesizing] the work of others". However, Coyle has acknowledged that Grinspoon's cannabis research "could have been an element" in the decision. In 2018, The Harvard Crimson published an editorial called "Grinspoon Reconsidered" that was highly critical of Harvard Medical School for retaliating against Grinspoon's now-visionary work on cannabis.

== Tributes ==
Lester had a cannabis strain named after him at one point; Dr. Grinspoon is a pure sativa heirloom strain that grows very tall with large, thin sativa-typical leaves. The Australian band Grinspoon are named after him, due to his cannabis stance. The legalization group NORML has a Lester Grinspoon Lifetime Achievement Award.

== Bibliography ==
Grinspoon is the author or co-author of several cannabis/psychedelic-related books, including Marihuana Reconsidered (publication dates 1971, 1977 and 1994), Psychedelic Drugs Reconsidered, Marijuana: The Forbidden Medicine and Psychedelic Reflections. The first two were published during the 1970s, when it appeared cannabis was well on its way to nationwide decriminalization in the United States. Marijuana: The Forbidden Medicine was published in 1993. It describes a variety of ailments for which cannabis ingestion may be indicated. Other books on psychoactive drugs: Grinspoon L.-Hedblom P. The speed culture. Amphetamine use and abuse in America. Harvard U.P. 1975; Grinspoon L.-Bakalar J.B. Cocaine. A drug and its social evolution. Basic Books 1976 (revised ed. 1985); Bakalar J.B.-Grinspoon L. Drug control in a free society. Cambridge U.P. 1984. Grinspoon contributed a chapter to Jefferson Fish's book How to Legalize Drugs.

Grinspoon ran two websites: Marijuana: The Forbidden Medicine that includes thousands of individual anecdotes concerning the medical uses of marijuana as well as Q&A; and Uses of Marijuana, which allows for people to submit essays relating to the 'enhancing' effects that marijuana can have on the user. The focus is on effects which are meaningful for the individual: not merely 'increased appetite', but rather effects such as increased creativity, rushes of insight/new ideas, or increased appreciation for music, art and nature.

== Media appearances ==
Grinspoon appeared in an episode of the Showtime series Penn & Teller: Bullshit! The episode, which addressed America's war on drugs, aired in the show's second season. Grinspoon discussed the way marijuana helped his young son while he was dying from leukemia in the 1970s, completely eliminating the horrible nausea and vomiting he experienced after each of his chemotherapy treatments and, thereby, making the final year and a half of the boy's life far more comfortable, for his son, and for Grinspoon and his wife by not having to endure the pain of witnessing their son suffer. Grinspoon also appeared in the Canadian documentary The Union: The Business Behind Getting High and discussed the pharmaceutical characteristics of marinol, as well as his writing experiences with Carl Sagan. He appeared in the 2011 Montana PBS documentary Clearing the Smoke: The Science of Cannabis.

== Censorship ==
In December 2025, the Lukashenko regime added Marijuana: The Forbidden Medicine to the List of printed publications containing information materials, the distribution of which could harm the national interests of Belarus.
