= Peter Grinspoon =

American physician (born 1966)

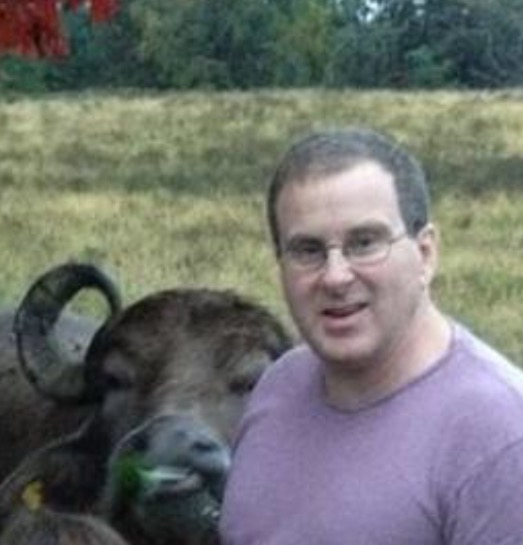
- Born: 1966 (age 59–60)
- Education: Boston University School of Medicine, Swarthmore College
- Occupation: Physician
- Employers: Massachusetts General Hospital; Harvard Medical School
- Father: Lester Grinspoon
- Relatives: David Grinspoon (brother)

Peter Grinspoon (born 1966) is an American physician. He is an internist and board certified addiction specialist at Massachusetts General Hospital and an instructor at Harvard Medical School. He is an expert on the topic of medical and recreational cannabis, and also has a strong interest in the areas of physician health, addiction and recovery, and in psychedelic treatments.

His 2016 book Free Refills: A Doctor Confronts His Addiction describes recovery from an opiate addiction from his perspective as a physician.His subsequent book, Seeing Through the Smoke: A Cannabis Expert Untangles the Truth About Marijuana, features a foreword written by Dr. Andrew Weil. His latest book, Aging Well with Cannabis: Feel Better, and Live Better with Marijuana and CBD (Hachette, 5/5/26) features a foreword by renowned cannabis researcher Dr. Staci Gruber. He has appeared on national television programs including The Daily Show, Good Morning America, CBS Mornings, Fox and Friends, Fox Nation, NBC Nightly News, MSNBC and C-SPAN2 to discuss drug policy, cannabis legalization as well as his addiction and recovery. He served as an Associate Director for Massachusetts Physician Health Service, part of the Massachusetts Medical Society from 2013 to 2015, helping and advocating for other physicians who struggle with addiction.

Grinspoon is also a contributing editor to Harvard Health Publications.

He speaks internationally on various cannabis-related issues. He is frequently cited in the popular press, and has been noted in USA Today, The Washington Post, The New York Times, The Wall Street Journal, People Magazine, NY Magazine, The Daily Beast, and The Boston Globe.

He has also appeared on numerous podcasts and radio programs. He was featured on NPR's All Things Considered in a piece about the harmfulness of withholding medication assisted treatment for opioid use disorders from physicians.

== Early life and career ==
Grinspoon is the son of famous cannabis activist Lester Grinspoon and the brother of respected planetary scientist and popular writer David Grinspoon. He is the nephew of billionaire philanthropist Harold Grinspoon. He grew up in Wellesley, Massachusetts, with a twin brother Joshua, his older brother David, and another older brother Danny, who died at the age of 16 from leukemia. Danny's struggle with leukemia has been documented in the popular press as medical cannabis was vitally helpful to him and Danny's parents were forced to procure cannabis illegally for him during Nixon's War on Cannabis.

Grinspoon graduated from Swarthmore College with Honors in Philosophy and then went to work for Greenpeace for five years before enrolling in medical school. At Greenpeace, he wrote an influential piece in The Nation titled, "Atom and Eve: A Love Story" based on leaked documents from the nuclear industry. He also was instrumental in one of Greenpeace's most high-profile protests, the successful stoppage of a Trident 2 nuclear missile test.

In 1993, Grinspoon entered Boston University School of Medicine, graduating with Honors. From 1997 to 2000 He trained at Harvard's Brigham and Women's Hospital, in the Primary Care Medical Residency, giving his senior presentation on medical cannabis.

== Additional activities ==
Grinspoon was a consultant to the 2018 production of Jagged Little Pill at the American Repertory Theater. He was a contributor to Harvard's online course OpioidX: The Opioid Crisis in America. He was one of the featured members of the Boston Resilient Exhibit, which honored Boston-area leaders in the fight against addiction. He served as an expert witness at the lawsuit successfully challenging the ban against vaping cannabis in Massachusetts in 2019.
