= Julian Edelman =

American football player (born 1986)

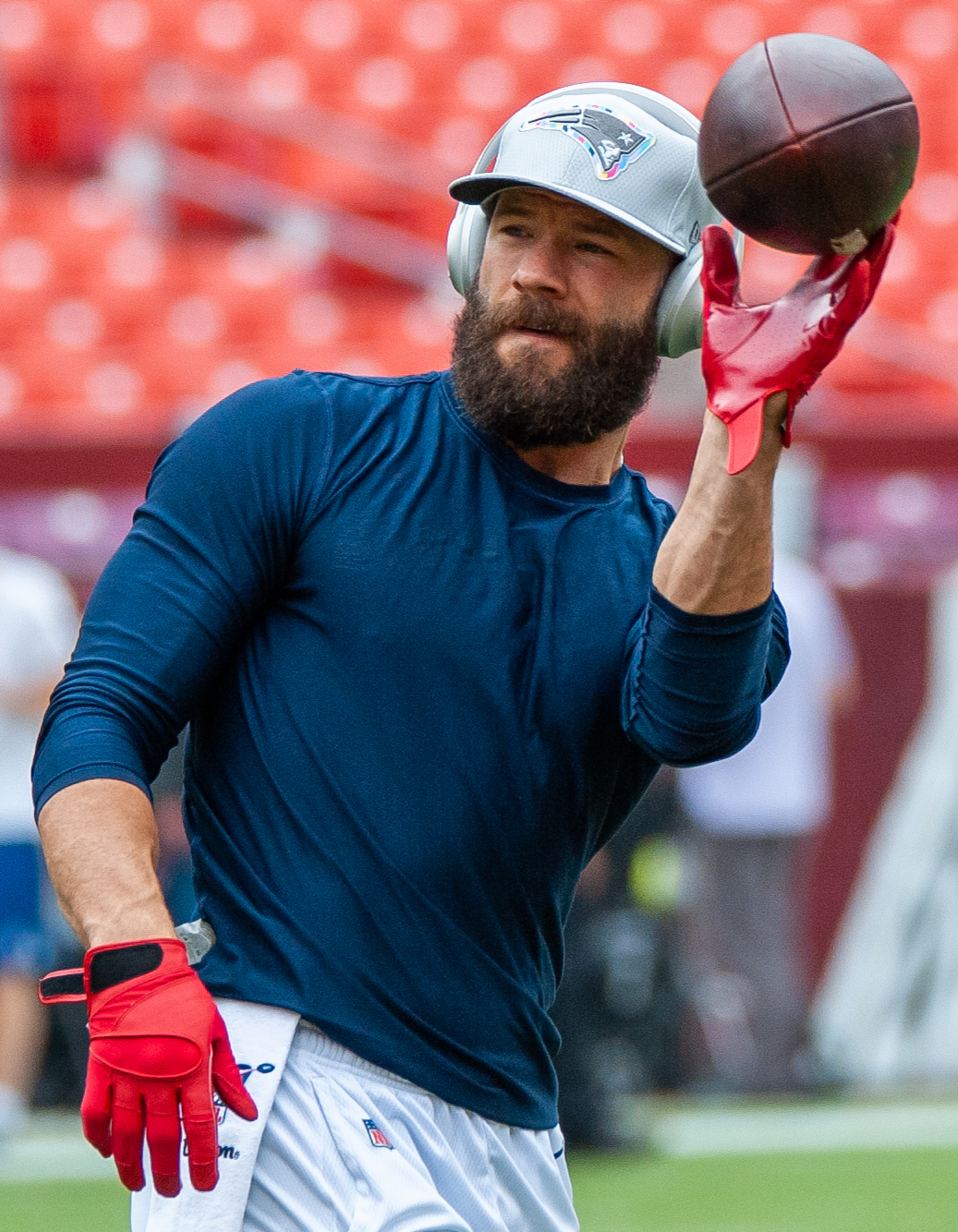
- Edelman with the New England Patriots in 2019

No. 11
- Position: Wide receiver

Personal information
- Born: May 22, 1986 (age 40); Redwood City, California, U.S.
- Listed height: 5 ft 10 in (1.78 m)
- Listed weight: 198 lb (90 kg)

Career information
- High school: Woodside (Woodside, California)
- College: San Mateo (2005); Kent State (2006–2008)
- NFL draft: 2009: 7th round, 232nd overall pick

Career history
- New England Patriots (2009–2020)

Awards and highlights
- 3× Super Bowl champion (XLIX, LI, LIII); Super Bowl MVP (LIII); New England Patriots Hall of Fame; International Jewish Sports Hall of Fame (2026); New England Patriots All-2010s Team; New England Patriots All-Dynasty Team; Second-team All-MAC (2006); NFL records: Most career punt return yards in the postseason: 443

Career NFL statistics
- Receptions: 620
- Receiving yards: 6,822
- Receiving touchdowns: 36
- Return yards: 2,612
- Return touchdowns: 4
- Stats at Pro Football Reference

Julian Francis Edelman (born May 22, 1986) is an American former professional football wide receiver who played in the National Football League (NFL) for 12 seasons with the New England Patriots. He played college football for the Kent State Golden Flashes as a quarterback and was selected in the seventh round of the 2009 NFL draft by the Patriots, where he became a return specialist and wide receiver. Edelman became a primary offensive starter in 2013 and was a staple of the Patriots' receiving corps until his retirement after the 2020 season.

One of the NFL's most productive postseason receivers, Edelman ranks third in postseason receiving yards and receptions and holds the Super Bowl records for punt returns and first-half receptions in a single game. A three-time Super Bowl winner, he was the receiving yards leader during his victories in Super Bowl XLIX and Super Bowl LIII. Edelman was named MVP of the latter, accounting for more than half his team's receiving yards.

== Early life ==
Edelman was born in Redwood City, California, to Angela "Angie" (née Gole) and Frank Edelman, a mechanic who owns A-1 Auto Tech. He has two siblings, Jason and Nicole. Edelman was raised as a Christian but has experienced what he described as a "Jewish awakening." In an NFL Network interview in December 2013, Edelman said that he was Jewish and celebrated Hanukkah. His mother was born in Kitchener, Ontario, Canada, to German parents who had lived in Belgium.

Edelman played varsity football and baseball at Woodside High School in Woodside, California. He was extremely small as a freshman, weighing under 100 pounds (45 kg) before his growth spurt. Edelman was the quarterback for his high-school team, and as a senior, he led the Wildcats to a 13–0 record in 2004. In high school, Edelman threw for 2,237 yards and 29 touchdowns and rushed for 964 yards and 13 touchdowns.

== College career ==
After high school, Edelman spent a year attending the College of San Mateo, where he threw for 1,312 yards and 14 touchdowns and rushed for a school-record 1,253 yards and 17 touchdowns. Edelman then transferred to Kent State University, where he majored in business management. At Kent State, Edelman was a three-year starter at quarterback. As a senior, Edelman was the Golden Flashes' leading passer, completing 153-of-275 passes for 1,820 yards, 13 touchdowns, and 11 interceptions. He was also their leading rusher, gaining 1,370 yards on 215 attempts (an average of 6.4 yards per carry) and scoring 13 touchdowns. Edelman's total offense broke Joshua Cribbs's single-season school record, which was set in 2003.

== Professional career ==
Pre-draft measurables
Height	Weight	40-yard dash	10-yard split	20-yard split	20-yard shuttle	Three-cone drill	Vertical jump	Broad jump	Bench press
5 ft 10 3/8 in (1.79 m)	195 lb (88 kg)	4.52 s	1.52 s	2.58 s	3.92 s	6.62 s	36.5 in (0.93 m)	10 ft 3 in (3.12 m)	14 reps
All values from Kent State Pro Day

Edelman was not invited to the 2009 NFL Combine. At his March 12 Pro Day, Edelman ran the short shuttle in 3.92 seconds; the fastest time at the Combine that year was 3.96 seconds.

=== 2009 season ===
The New England Patriots, who had conducted private workouts with Edelman before the 2009 NFL draft, selected him with the 27th pick of the seventh round (232nd overall), ahead of Michigan State quarterback Brian Hoyer, who joined the Patriots as a free agent. Several analysts suggested that the Patriots may have selected Edelman for his potential in a Wildcat formation; when the pick was made, Edelman was announced as a wide receiver.

On July 16, 2009, Edelman signed a four-year contract with the Patriots that included a $48,700 signing bonus. Edelman later stated that he knew he lacked the ability to make an NFL roster as a quarterback, so he prepared himself to play at positions other than quarterback before the draft. The BC Lions placed Edelman on their "negotiation list," a list of American players for which they have exclusive negotiating rights, and offered him a three-year, incentive-heavy contract to play quarterback.

On August 13, 2009, in a preseason game against the Philadelphia Eagles, Edelman returned a punt 75 yards, and he made the team over former Eagles wide receiver Greg Lewis, for whom the Patriots had given up a fifth-round draft pick in 2009.

Edelman missed the season-opener against the Buffalo Bills due to an ankle injury, but he made his first career start in the Patriots' 16–9 loss in Week 2 against the New York Jets, which was also the first game Wes Welker had missed since becoming a Patriot in 2007. Edelman led all receivers with eight receptions for 98 yards and added 38 yards on two kickoff returns and two yards on a punt return, for a total of 138 all-purpose yards.

Edelman broke his arm in the Patriots' Week 6 59–0 rout of the Tennessee Titans, and did not accompany the Patriots on their trip to London to play the Tampa Bay Buccaneers. At the time of his injury, Edelman was leading all rookies that season with 21 receptions. He returned with the Patriots' Week 10 game against the Indianapolis Colts, scoring his first official NFL touchdown on a nine-yard reception from Tom Brady.

When Welker was sidelined for the season after tearing two knee ligaments against the Houston Texans, Edelman was again called on to fill Welker's role; Edelman caught 10 of the 15 passes thrown to him for 103 yards, the first 100-yard game of his NFL career. Edelman finished the regular season with 37 receptions for 359 yards and a touchdown. He also made six punt returns as well as 11 kickoff returns, gaining 304 yards in all on 17 returns.

In the Patriots' Wild Card Round playoff loss to the Baltimore Ravens, Edelman caught six passes from Brady for 44 yards, including both of the Patriots' touchdowns. He became the first rookie to score two receiving touchdowns in one postseason game since David Sloan did so for the Detroit Lions in the 1995 season.

=== 2010 season ===
In the 2010 season, Edelman saw a decrease in playing time; through 15 games, he had four receptions for 14 yards. In the Week 17 game against the Miami Dolphins, with Welker, Deion Branch, and Aaron Hernandez inactive, Edelman capitalized with three receptions for 72 yards and a 94-yard punt return touchdown. It was the first punt return touchdown by a Patriot in the regular season since Troy Brown returned one against the Carolina Panthers in the Week 17 of the 2001 season, and the longest punt return in Patriots franchise history, eclipsing an 89-yard return by Mike Haynes in 1976.

Edelman set a franchise record by averaging 15.3 yards per return, which was second in the league after the Bears' Devin Hester. For the 2010 season, Edelman played in 15 games with seven receptions for 86 yards and 321 return yards on 21 punt returns. In the Divisional Round against the New York Jets, Edelman had a 12-yard reception during the 28–21 loss.

=== 2011 season: First Super Bowl appearance ===
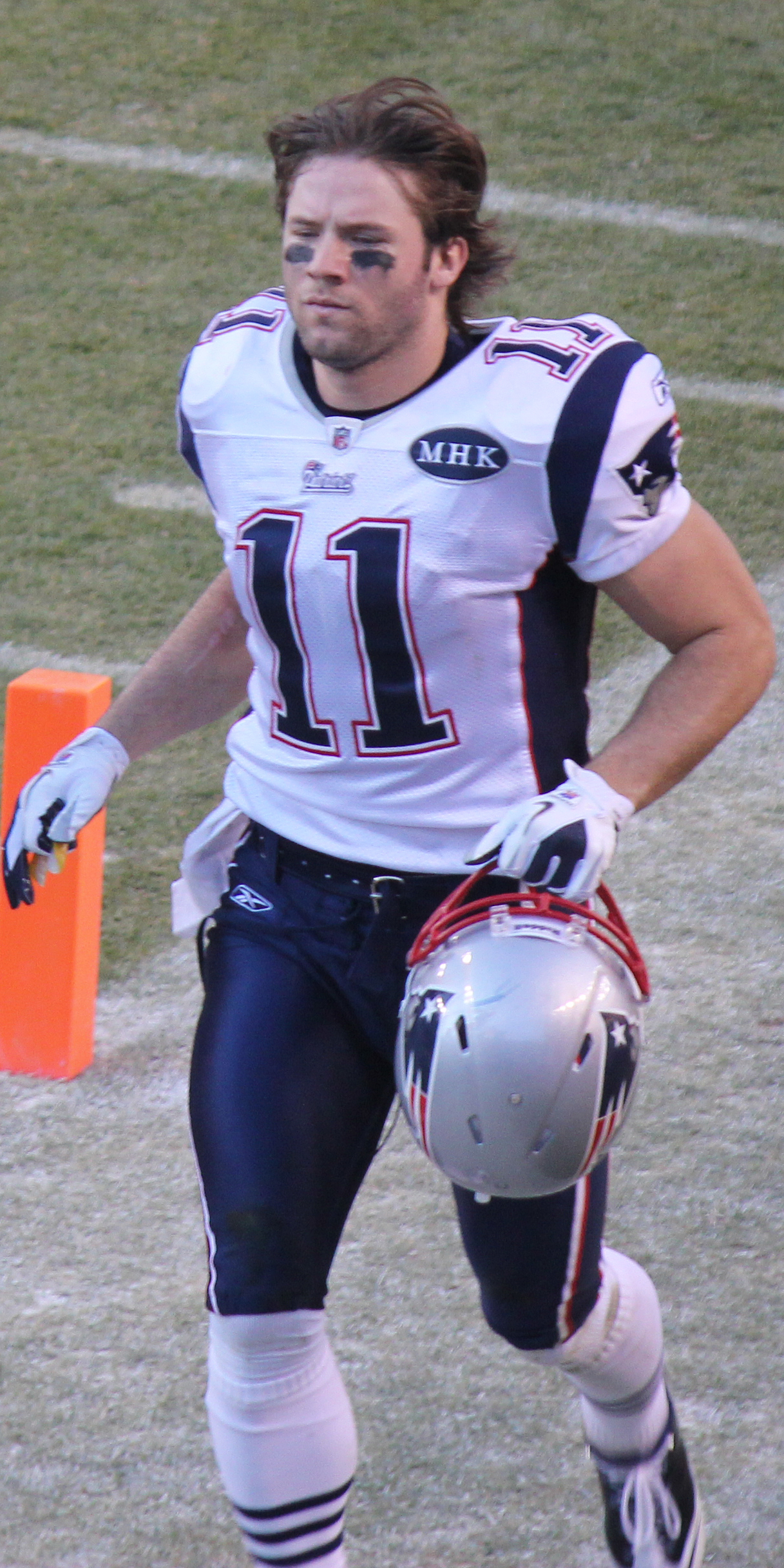
Edelman in 2011

During the 2011 season, Edelman was used primarily as a kick and punt returner. During Week 10 against the New York Jets, because of injuries to the Patriots' secondary, he was pressed into service as a defensive back during the fourth quarter; Edelman earned his first tackle on defense by stopping running back LaDainian Tomlinson on a play in which Tomlinson injured his knee.

During Week 11 on Monday Night Football against the Kansas City Chiefs, Edelman played defensive back in nickel and dime situations. He also returned a punt 72 yards for a touchdown, which helped Edelman earn his first AFC Special Teams Player of the Week award. In the next game, he was nominated for the NFL's "Hardest Working Man" for his performance against the Philadelphia Eagles, where Edelman made an open-field tackle on Vince Young to prevent a touchdown. For the 2011 season, Edelman played 13 games with four receptions for 34 yards and 584 return yards on 40 kickoff and punt returns.

In the AFC Championship Game against the Baltimore Ravens, Edelman played on 27 of 67 offensive snaps at wide receiver, catching one pass that converted a third down attempt, and 27 of 73 defensive snaps at cornerback, often covering the Ravens' Anquan Boldin; Edelman was credited with a forced fumble on the Ravens' final drive. The Patriots went on to win the AFC Championship, but lost Super Bowl XLVI to the New York Giants. Edelman had three kickoff returns for 73 return yards in the game.

=== 2012 season ===
Edelman's snap count increased in the first two games of the 2012 season, including a Week 2 home loss to the Arizona Cardinals in which he started over Wes Welker. After suffering a hand injury in the Patriots' Week 3 loss to the Baltimore Ravens, Edelman was inactive for the next three games. He then saw limited duty until the Patriots' record-tying Week 11 victory over the Indianapolis Colts, where he had one of the best games of his career. Edelman caught five passes for 58 yards and a two-yard touchdown, picked up 47 yards on a single rushing attempt on a reverse play, and returned two punts for a total of 117 yards. The first of those punt returns was a 68-yard punt return for a touchdown, giving Edelman three punt return touchdowns, tying the Patriots franchise mark. Edelman had 105 yards of total offense and 222 all-purpose yards with two touchdowns.

On Thanksgiving Day, Edelman scored two more touchdowns in the second quarter of the Patriots' victory over the New York Jets, in which they tied a franchise record with five touchdowns and 35 points in one quarter; he recovered a Jets' fumble and returned it 22 yards on a kickoff return right after the Butt Fumble touchdown, and then caught a 56-yard touchdown pass from Tom Brady. Although Edelman left early in the third quarter with a head injury, he became the first player since the AFL–NFL merger with both a receiving touchdown and a return touchdown in consecutive games. In the next game against the Miami Dolphins, Edelman broke his right foot and was placed on injured reserve, prematurely ending his season. Overall in 2012, Edelman played in nine games with 21 receptions for 235 yards and 301 return yards on 20 kickoff-punt combined return opportunities.

=== 2013 season ===
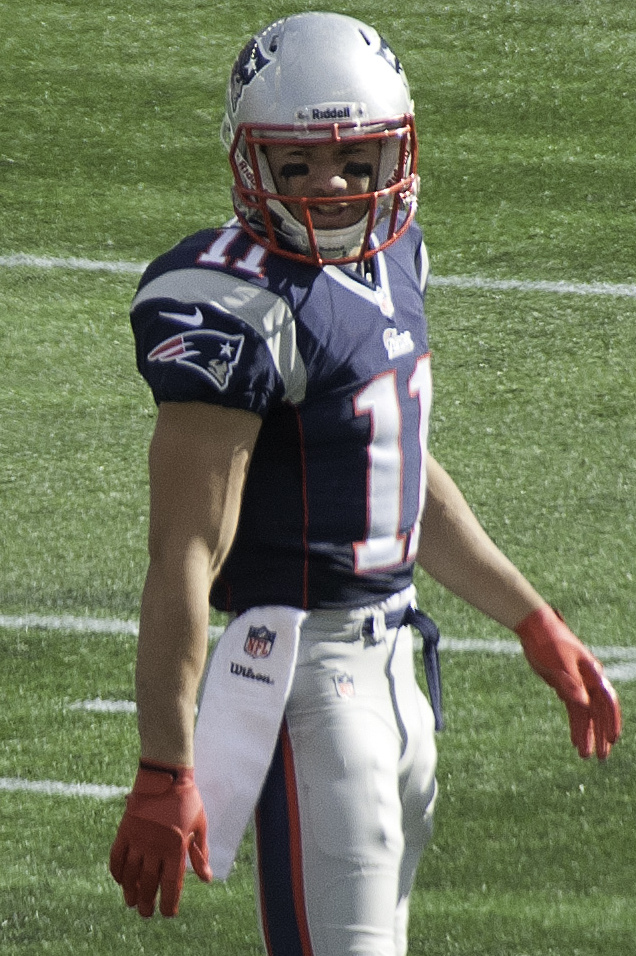
Edelman in 2013

Edelman became a free agent after the 2012 season. He re-signed with New England on a one-year deal on April 10, 2013.

During the 2013 season opener, Edelman scored both of New England's touchdowns in the narrow 23–21 victory over the Buffalo Bills. He also had three punt returns for a total of 32 yards, which gave him a career total of 75 returns for 975 yards. Edelman became the NFL's all-time leader in career punt return average, with 13.0 yards per return, surpassing the 12.8-yard average of former Chicago Bear George McAfee, although his average dropped below 12.8 shortly afterward.

Edelman had nine catches on 11 attempts for 110 yards and two touchdowns in a historic Week 12 comeback victory at home over the Denver Broncos; the Patriots overcame a 24-point halftime deficit, scored 31 unanswered points, and kicked the winning field goal in the closing minutes of overtime. Edelman outperformed Denver's triplet star wide receivers combined. In Week 17, Edelman became the third Patriots player in team history to catch over 100 passes in a season in the Patriots' 34–20 win over the Buffalo Bills in their second divisional matchup. 2013 became a breakout season for Edelman as he played in all 16 games making 105 receptions for 1,056 yards and 35 punt return opportunities for 374 yards.

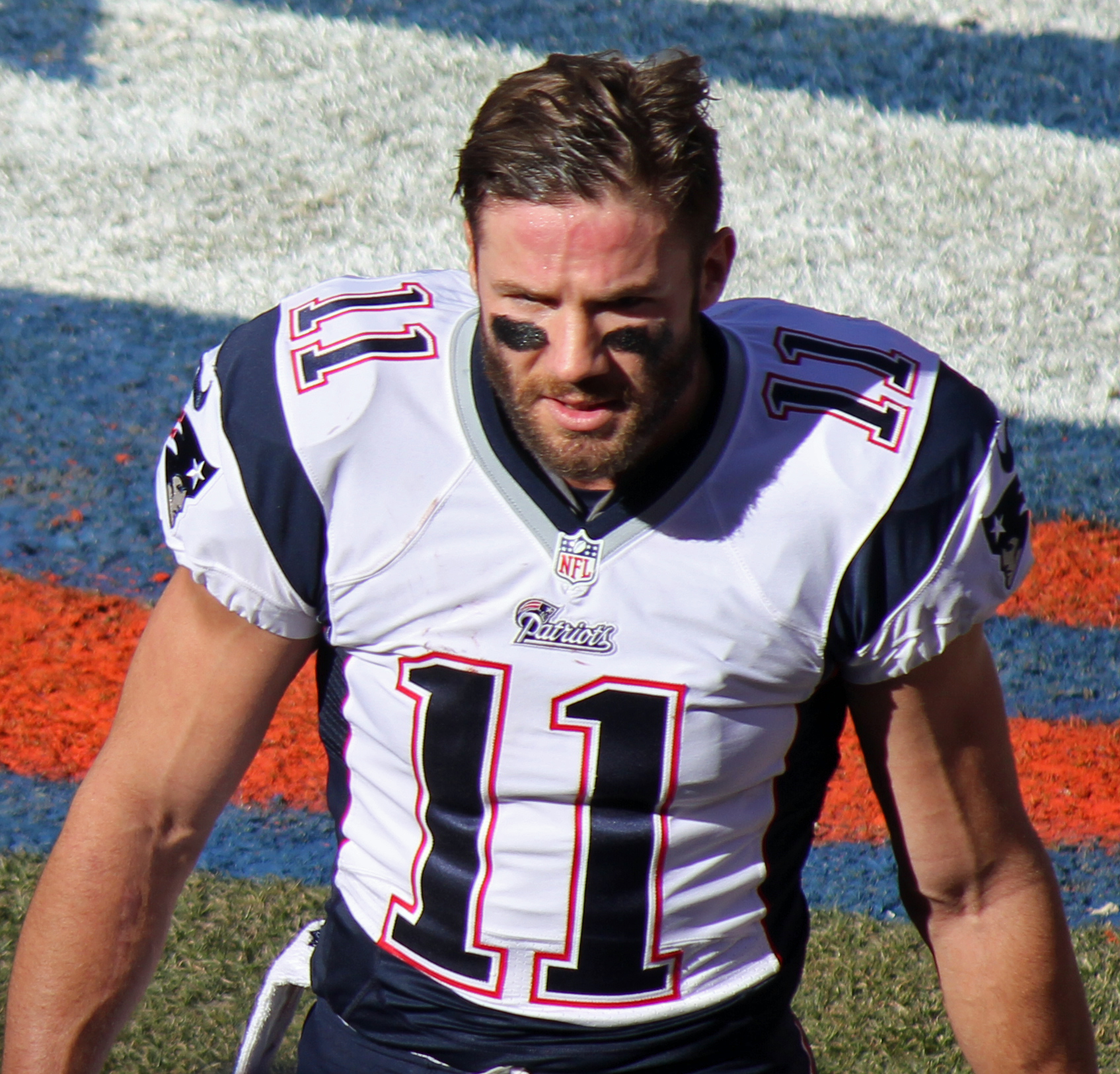
Edelman in the AFC Championship Game in Denver in January 2014

The Patriots won the AFC East and faced the Indianapolis Colts in the Divisional Round. In the 43–22 victory, Edelman had six receptions for 84 yards. During the AFC Championship Game against the Broncos, he had 10 receptions for 89 yards in the 26–16 road loss.

=== 2014 season: First Super Bowl win ===
On March 15, 2014, Edelman re-signed with the Patriots on a four-year deal for $17 million.

Edelman started 14 games for the Patriots in 2014. He had 92 receptions for 972 yards and four touchdowns. During Week 9 against the Denver Broncos, Edelman returned a punt 84 yards for his fourth career return touchdown, passing Troy Brown for the most punt return touchdowns in Patriots history. During Week 14 the San Diego Chargers, Edelman caught a pass from Tom Brady then broke two tackles and ran for 69 yards for a touchdown; it was the final touchdown of the game that led the Patriots to a 23–14 victory.

The Patriots won the AFC East and returned to the playoffs. Edelman recorded his first NFL touchdown pass on his first NFL pass attempt in the Patriots' Divisional Round game against the Baltimore Ravens. After receiving a lateral pass from Brady, Edelman threw a forward pass to Danny Amendola, who scored a 51-yard touchdown to tie the game at 28–28. In the AFC Championship against the Indianapolis Colts, Edelman had nine receptions for 98 yards in the 45–7 victory.

In Super Bowl XLIX against the Seattle Seahawks, Edelman led all receivers in yardage with 109 yards on nine receptions (teammate Shane Vereen had 11 receptions). His touchdown reception with 2:02 left in the fourth quarter—his only touchdown reception of the postseason—was the final go-ahead score of the game, putting the Patriots up 28–24. For the postseason as a whole, Edelman led all receivers in both receptions (26) and receiving yards (281). He was ranked 91st by his fellow players on the NFL Top 100 Players of 2015.

=== 2015 season ===
On September 10, Edelman started for the Patriots against the Pittsburgh Steelers in the season-opening game on Thursday Night Football. He led the Patriots in yards and receptions, recording 11 receptions for 97 yards, in the 28–21 victory. In the next game against the Buffalo Bills, Edelman got 11 catches, which made it the first time in his career he had back-to-back games with at least 10 catches. Edelman then caught four passes on five targets for 120 yards against the Dallas Cowboys three weeks later.

Against the New York Giants on November 15, Edelman suffered an injury to his fifth metatarsal on his left foot that required him to undergo foot surgery the next day. Edelman was expected to be back on the field in six to eight weeks, in time for the playoffs, though that was contingent on the recovery process. Through nine games, Edelman had made 61 catches for 692 yards and seven touchdowns. He returned for the Divisional Round against the Kansas City Chiefs. Edelman had 10 catches for 100 yards to help the Patriots defeat the Chiefs 27–20 and advance to the AFC Championship Game for the fifth consecutive year, where he had seven receptions for 53 yards, but the Patriots narrowly lost on the road 20–18 to the Denver Broncos. For his efforts in 2015, Edelman was ranked 87th on the NFL Top 100 Players of 2016.

=== 2016 season: Second Super Bowl Championship ===
On September 15, 2016, Edelman was fined $26,309 for a hit on a defenseless player when he hit linebacker Deone Bucannon helmet-to-helmet. During Week 13 against the Los Angeles Rams, he had eight receptions for 101 yards in the 26–10 victory. In the regular-season, Edelman got a block by newcomer wide receiver Michael Floyd on a catch and run that led to a career-long 77-yard touchdown in a 35–14 road victory over the Miami Dolphins. Edelman finished the game with eight receptions for 151 yards, earning him AFC Offensive Player of the Week honors. Edelman became the first Patriots wide receiver to receive the award since Randy Moss in 2007. Edelman finished the season with 98 receptions for a career-high 1,106 yards and 3 touchdowns. For his efforts in 2017, Edelman was ranked 71st by his peers on the NFL Top 100 Players of 2017.

In the Divisional Round against the Houston Texans, Edelman caught his 70th postseason pass, breaking Wes Welker's Patriots franchise record. Edelman recorded eight receptions for 137 yards during the 34–16 victory as the Patriots reached the AFC Championship Game for an NFL record sixth consecutive season. During that game, Edelman caught eight passes for 118 yards in the 36–17 victory over the Pittsburgh Steelers. The Patriots advanced to an NFL record ninth Super Bowl appearance.

During Super Bowl LI against the Atlanta Falcons, Edelman had five receptions for 87 yards. The highlight was an unusually difficult catch in the fourth quarter, where the pass was first tipped into the air by cornerback Robert Alford and it appeared that it would fall incomplete, but Edelman and three defenders (Alford, Ricardo Allen, and Keanu Neal) lunged at the ball, and, after it bounced off Alford's leg, Edelman made the reception just inches above the ground. It was ruled a catch on the field and withstood a challenge from Falcons head coach Dan Quinn. NFL Films called the play, which was chosen for the cover of Sports Illustrated, "the greatest catch in Super Bowl history". Edelman's catch sustained a historic comeback for the Patriots, who trailed the Falcons 28–3 late in the third quarter before winning 34–28 in overtime. However, Edelman later stated that he does not like to be reminded of the catch or watch it on replay because it resulted from his own error in running the route.

=== 2017 season: Missed season due to injury ===
On June 8, 2017, Edelman signed a two-year, $11 million contract extension with the Patriots, with $9 million guaranteed through the 2019 season. On August 25, in the team's third preseason game against the Detroit Lions, Edelman tore his anterior cruciate ligament (ACL), ending his season before it even started. Edelman was placed on injured reserve eight days later. Without Edelman, the Patriots finished with a 13–3 record and reached Super Bowl LII, where they lost to the Philadelphia Eagles by a score of 41–33.

=== 2018 season: Super Bowl MVP ===
In February 2018, it was reported that Edelman expected to be ready to play by the 2018 training camp. On June 7, it was announced that Edelman was expected to be suspended for four games due to a violation of the policy against using performance-enhancing drugs. On June 26, Edelman appealed the suspension, but his appeal was denied eight days later. Edelman missed the first four games of the season and was activated on October 2.

Edelman played on Thursday Night Football against the Indianapolis Colts, where he caught seven passes for 57 yards. Three weeks later against the Buffalo Bills, he had nine receptions for 104 yards in the victory on Monday Night Football. During a Week 10 34–10 road loss to the Tennessee Titans, Edelman posted nine receptions for 104 yards once again. On December 29, he was fined $63,504 for three personal foul penalties in Week 16. Edelman finished the 2018 season with 74 receptions for 850 yards and six touchdowns. The Patriots finished with an 11–5 record and earned the #2-seed in the AFC in the playoffs.

In the Divisional Round against the Los Angeles Chargers, Edelman had nine receptions for 151 yards during the 41–28 victory. During the AFC Championship Game against the Kansas City Chiefs, he recorded seven receptions for 96 yards in the 37–31 overtime road victory, including two catches on 3rd-and-long situations to keep the eventual game-winning drive in overtime going. In Super Bowl LIII against the Los Angeles Rams, Edelman caught 10 passes on 12 targets for 141 yards during the 13–3 victory, an effort for which he was named Most Valuable Player (MVP). Edelman became the first wide receiver to win Super Bowl MVP since Santonio Holmes did so in Super Bowl XLIII in 2009. Edelman finished the postseason with 26 receptions for 388 yards, totals high enough to move him into second place all-time in playoff receptions and receiving yards behind Jerry Rice. Edelman was the first Jewish football player to be named Super Bowl MVP.

Edelman's MVP award drew criticism as it came in the same season where he was suspended for using an unspecified performance-enhancing substance. The NFL prohibits players suspended for PED use from receiving awards given by the league or the NFL Players' Association. In an interview after the Super Bowl, Edelman apologized.

Edelman's performance in the 2018 playoffs has also led to debate about inducting him into the Hall of Fame despite a relative lack of regular season production. Edelman was ranked 90th by his fellow players on the NFL Top 100 Players of 2019.

=== 2019 season ===
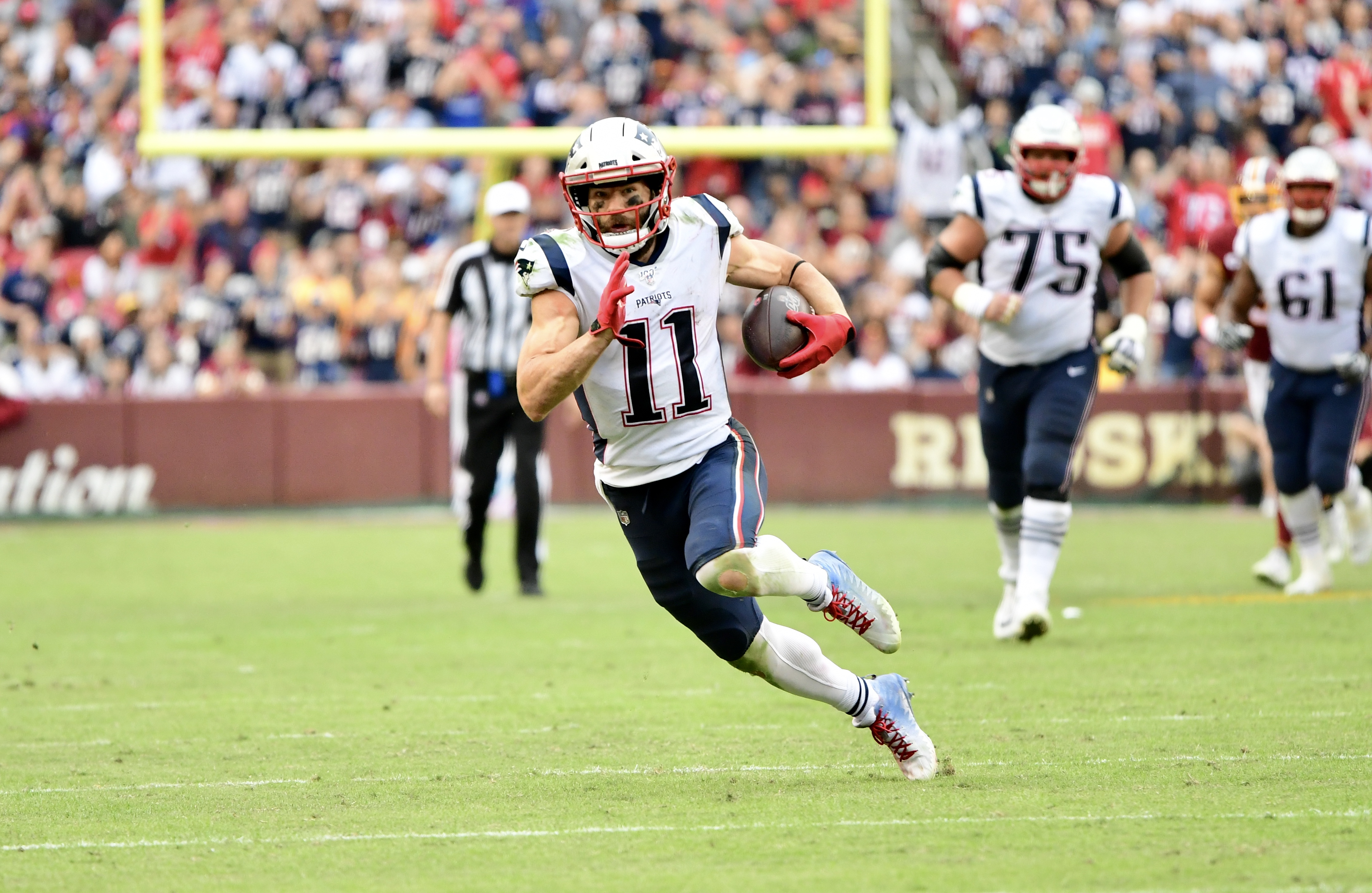
Edelman in a game against the Washington Redskins

On May 21, 2019, Edelman signed a two-year, $18 million contract extension with the Patriots with $12 million guaranteed, keeping him under contract through the 2021 season.

In Week 1 against the Pittsburgh Steelers, Edelman caught six passes for 83 yards and threw a pass for 32 yards during the 33–3 victory. Two weeks later against the New York Jets, he caught seven passes for 62 yards and his first touchdown of the season in the 30–14 victory. However, Edelman suffered a rib injury in the second quarter that forced him out of the game. Edelman rebounded from injury in Week 5 against the Washington Redskins, where he had eight receptions for 110 yards and a touchdown; Edelman became the first Patriot to record at least 100 yards all season. In the next game against the New York Giants, Edelman recorded nine catches for 113 yards during the 35–14 victory. In the game, he surpassed Stanley Morgan for the third most receptions in Patriots history. Two weeks later against the Cleveland Browns, Edelman caught eight passes for 78 yards and a season-high two touchdowns in the 27–13 victory.

During Week 11 against the Philadelphia Eagles, Edelman caught five passes for 53 yards and threw a 15-yard touchdown to Phillip Dorsett II in the 17–10 victory. Two weeks later against the Houston Texans on Sunday Night Football, Edelman had six receptions for 106 yards and a touchdown during the 28–22 road loss. In the regular-season finale against the Miami Dolphins, Edelman recorded three receptions for 26 yards during the 27–24 loss, reaching 100 receptions on the season. He finished the 2019 season with 100 receptions for 1,117 yards and six touchdowns. During the Wild Card Round against the Tennessee Titans, Edelman caught three passes for 30 yards and rushed twice for 12 yards and a touchdown in the 20–13 loss.

=== 2020 season ===
During Week 2 against the Seattle Seahawks, Edelman finished with eight receptions for a career-high 179 yards as the Patriots lost on the road 35–30 on NBC Sunday Night Football. During Week 6 against the Denver Broncos, he completed two passes in the game on trick plays in the 18–12 loss. Edelman played his final game on October 25, 2020, which was a 33–6 loss to the San Francisco 49ers. He finished the game with a 13-yard reception. Six days later, Edelman was placed on injured reserve after undergoing minor knee surgery. He was placed on the reserve/COVID-19 list by the team on November 30, and moved back to injured reserve on December 10. Six days later, Edelman was designated to return from injured reserve, opening a 21-day window for the Patriots to put him on the active roster, but head coach Bill Belichick announced on January 1, 2021, that Edelman would not be activated before the end of the season.

=== Retirement ===
Edelman announced his retirement on April 12, 2021, after 12 seasons with the Patriots. His retirement occurred after the Patriots ended Edelman's contract because he failed a physical. After the announcement, Bill Belichick issued a statement that praised Edelman's competitiveness and mental and physical toughness, calling him the "quintessential throwback player" for his versatile skills, and said that it was a privilege to coach him. Robert Kraft, in his statement, called Edelman "one of the great success stories in our franchise’s history". On social media, Tom Brady wrote about his affection for Edelman as a player and friend, and Cam Newton posted that Edelman would be missed.

After his retirement, Edelman did a series of podcast interviews reviewing his career, including Pardon My Take and Green Light with Chris Long, a teammate of Edelman's during the 2016 season. Shortly after retiring from the NFL, he announced that he would start a media career and would join the cast of Inside the NFL on Paramount+. There was speculation that Edelman would later return to the NFL to play with former Patriots quarterback Tom Brady on the Tampa Bay Buccaneers following their former teammate Rob Gronkowski coming out of retirement to play with Brady on the Buccaneers, which included a remark by Brady himself. However, Edelman denied the rumors, saying that he was "a one-team guy".

Edelman's retirement also revived the debate about inducting him into the Pro Football Hall of Fame, which had begun after his MVP performance in Super Bowl LIII. Opponents cite Edelman's lack of Pro Bowl nominations and other usual metrics for evaluating NFL careers, while proponents cite his roles on three Super Bowl-winning Patriots teams and his ranking third all-time in postseason receptions and receiving yards.

== Career statistics ==
Legend
	Won the Super Bowl
	Super Bowl MVP
	Led the league
**Bold**	Career high

=== NFL ===
==== Regular season ====
Year	Team	Games		Receiving							Rushing					Returning					Passing							Fumbles	
Year	Team	GP	GS	Tgt	Rec	Yds	Avg	Lng	TD	FD	Att	Yds	Avg	Lng	TD	Ret	Yds	Avg	Lng	TD	Cmp	Att	Pct	Yds	TD	Int	Rtg	Fum	Lost
2009	NE	11	7	54	37	359	9.7	29	1	19	2	5	2.5	5	0	6	63	10.5	35	0	—	—	—	—	—	—	—	1	0
2010	NE	15	3	14	7	86	12.3	40	0	3	2	14	7.0	13	0	21	321	**15.3**	**94**	**1**	—	—	—	—	—	—	—	1	0
2011	NE	13	0	9	4	34	8.5	11	0	0	4	8	2.0	6	0	**40**	**580**	14.5	72	**1**	—	—	—	—	—	—	—	3	1
2012	NE	9	3	32	21	235	11.2	56	3	12	4	45	11.3	**47**	0	20	301	15.0	68	**1**	—	—	—	—	—	—	—	1	1
2013	NE	16	11	151	**105**	1,056	10.1	44	6	54	2	11	5.5	7	0	35	374	10.7	43	0	—	—	—	—	—	—	—	**6**	0
2014	NE	14	13	134	92	972	10.6	69	4	50	10	94	9.4	25	0	25	299	12.0	84	**1**	—	—	—	—	—	—	—	5	0
2015	NE	9	9	88	61	692	11.3	59	**7**	37	3	23	7.7	12	0	10	81	8.1	19	0	—	—	—	—	—	—	—	1	1
2016	NE	16	13	159	98	1,106	11.3	**77**	3	**56**	**12**	57	4.8	9	0	18	179	9.9	23	0	—	—	—	—	—	—	—	3	**2**
2017	NE	0	0	Did not play due to injury																									
2018	NE	12	12	108	74	850	11.5	36	6	41	9	**107**	**11.9**	20	0	20	154	7.7	25	0	**2**	**2**	**100.0**	43	0	0	118.7	1	0
2019	NE	16	13	**153**	100	**1,117**	11.2	44	6	54	8	27	3.4	9	0	1	19	19.0	19	0	**2**	**2**	**100.0**	**47**	**1**	0	**158.3**	3	1
2020	NE	6	1	39	21	315	**15.0**	49	0	18	2	22	11.0	23	0	—	—	—	—	—	**2**	**2**	**100.0**	38	0	0	118.7	0	0
Total		137	85	941	620	6,822	11.0	77	36	344	58	413	7.1	47	0	207	2,612	12.6	94	4	6	6	100.0	128	1	0	158.3	25	6

==== Postseason ====
Year	Team	Games		Receiving							Rushing					Returning					Passing							Fumbles	
Year	Team	GP	GS	Tgt	Rec	Yds	Avg	Lng	TD	FD	Att	Yds	Avg	Lng	TD	Ret	Yds	Avg	Lng	TD	Cmp	Att	Pct	Yds	TD	Int	Rtg	Fum	Lost
2009	NE	1	1	8	6	44	7.3	24	**2**	4	—	—	—	—	—	1	28	**28.0**	28	0	—	—	—	—	—	—	—	0	0
2010	NE	1	1	1	1	12	12.0	12	0	1	1	11	**11.0**	11	0	2	42	21.0	41	0	—	—	—	—	—	—	—	0	0
2011	NE	3	0	5	2	19	9.5	11	0	2	1	−1	−1.0	−1	0	7	108	15.4	31	0	—	—	—	—	—	—	—	0	0
2012	NE	0	0	Did not play due to injury																									
2013	NE	2	1	24	16	173	10.8	27	1	9	—	—	—	—	—	5	36	7.2	15	0	—	—	—	—	—	—	—	0	0
2014	NE	3	3	**37**	**26**	281	10.8	23	1	18	**2**	**19**	9.5	**12**	0	9	**143**	15.9	**45**	0	**1**	**1**	**100.0**	**51**	**1**	0	**158.3**	**2**	0
2015	NE	2	2	29	17	153	9.0	19	0	10	1	11	**11.0**	11	0	1	16	16.0	16	0	—	—	—	—	—	—	—	0	0
2016	NE	3	3	36	21	342	**16.3**	**48**	1	14	**2**	14	7.0	**12**	0	7	66	9.4	26	0	0	**1**	0.0	0	0	0	39.6	0	0
2017	NE	0	0	Did not play due to injury																									
2018	NE	3	3	35	**26**	**388**	14.9	35	0	**22**	**2**	15	7.5	8	0	**10**	77	7.7	16	0	—	—	—	—	—	—	—	0	0
2019	NE	1	1	5	3	30	10.0	20	0	2	2	12	6.0	7	**1**	—	—	—	—	—	—	—	—	—	—	—	—	1	0
Total		19	15	180	118	1,442	12.2	48	5	82	11	81	7.4	12	1	42	516	12.3	45	0	1	2	50.0	51	1	0	135.4	3	0

=== College ===
Season	Team	Games			Passing								Rushing				Total Yds	Total TDs
Season	Team	GP	GS	Record	Cmp	Att	Pct	Yds	Avg	TD	Int	Rtg	Att	Yds	Avg	TD	Total Yds	Total TDs
2005	San Mateo	11	11	**8–3**	80	169	47.3	1,312	**7.8**	**14**	7	**131.6**	192	1,253	**6.5**	**17**	2,565	**31**
2006	Kent State	11	11	6–5	134	242	55.4	**1,859**	7.7	10	**11**	124.4	169	658	3.9	7	2,517	17
2007	Kent State	8	8	3–5	98	189	51.9	1,318	7.0	7	9	113.1	118	455	3.9	2	1,773	9
2008	Kent State	12	12	4–8	**153**	**275**	**55.6**	1,820	6.6	13	**11**	118.8	**215**	**1,370**	6.4	13	**3,190**	26
FBS total		31	31	13–18	385	706	54.5	4,997	7.1	30	31	119.2	502	2,483	4.9	22	7,480	52

San Mateo source:

== Outside football ==
In 2016, Edelman became one of three Patriots (along with Malcolm Mitchell and Martellus Bennett) to publish a children's book. His book, Flying High, is about a squirrel named Jules who learns to overcome his physical limitations through hard work and the assistance of a goat named Tom. A sequel, Flying High 2, loosely based on Edelman's "greatest Super Bowl catch" against the Atlanta Falcons, was released in December 2017.

On October 24, 2017, Hachette Book Group published Edelman's memoir, Relentless, written with Tom E. Curran of NBC Sports Boston.

Edelman has his own clothing brand, JE11. He has worked with Joe's Jeans on a line of shirts and jeans, and with Cutters Sports on a line of football gloves.

Edelman has made cameo appearances on television, including episodes of the HBO sports dramedy Ballers and the reality competition America's Next Top Model. He has also presented twice at the Grammy Awards, in 2015 with teammate Malcolm Butler and in 2019 with teammate Devin McCourty. Edelman appeared in a Puma advertisement campaign in 2015.

With teammate Danny Amendola, Edelman was featured in a 30-minute NFL Network special, NFL Going Global: Edelman & Amendola, chronicling their promotional trip to Mexico City before the Patriots' 2017 game there.

The NFL Network documentary series A Football Life aired an episode about Edelman on November 25, 2022.

=== Nuthouse Sports ===
In 2019, Edelman co-founded a production company, Nuthouse Sports (formerly Coast Productions), with the founder of creative agency Superdigital, Assaf Swissa. Their first venture was the 2019 Showtime documentary 100%, about Edelman's recovery from a 2017 ACL tear and the 2018 NFL season. In April 2021, after Edelman's retirement, ViacomCBS signed a multi-year development deal with Coast Productions; in the deal, Edelman joined Inside the NFL as an analyst as it moved to Paramount+. Edelman was nominated for a Sports Emmy in 2022 for his first season on Inside the NFL.

In October 2024, Edelman and Swissa partnered with friend and former teammate Rob Gronkowski on the entertainment studio, Nuthouse Sports. Their first production together was the “Dudes on Dudes with Gronk and Jules” podcast which debuted on October 15, 2024.

=== Podcasting ===
In August 2022, Edelman along with comedian Sam Morril began co-hosting a iHeartMedia podcast, Games with Names. The podcast revisited some of the most iconic and memorable games in sports history with guests on the show typically include players, coaches, and celebrity fans. In 2023, Edelman continued to host the show by himself after Morril left the podcast.

In October 2024, Edelman along with his friend and former teammate, Rob Gronkowski, launched another iHeartMedia podcast, Dudes on Dudes.

Along with hosting, Edelman has made numerous appearances on other podcasts and sports shows. These include New Heights hosted by Travis and Jason Kelce, Cold as Balls by Kevin Hart, and The Von Cast hosted by Von Miller amongst many others. Edelman's appearance on the New Heights podcast showed him doing an impersonation of his former Patriots head coach Bill Belichick. His impersonation of Belichick went on to become an internet meme and sensation, garnering millions of views after being posted by almost every major sports network in America.

== Personal life ==
Edelman dated Brazilian model Adriana Lima on and off in 2016 and 2017. He has a daughter, Lily, born with Swedish model Ella Rose. In an interview with the magazine Haute Living in 2019, Edelman detailed how challenging and rewarding he found being a father. Edelman explained that fatherhood had changed his view of life.

Edelman's paternal great-grandfather, Harry Edelman, was Jewish; after emigrating from Poland to England, he married Mabel Hennessey, a woman of Irish Catholic background, Julian's great-grandmother. As an adult, Edelman has experienced what he described as a "Jewish awakening." During an NFL Network interview in December 2013, Edelman stated that he identifies as Jewish and celebrates Hanukkah; he has become "more attuned to the religion and history." In 2014, Edelman wore an Israeli-American flag pin on his hat during a game against the Denver Broncos at Gillette Stadium. He also voiced support for the victims of the Pittsburgh synagogue shooting: Edelman wore an Israeli flag hat following the Patriots' victory over the Green Bay Packers on November 4, 2018, and wore a pair of customized cleats bearing the hashtag #strongerthanhate in a game against the Pittsburgh Steelers six weeks later. Edelman shared a photo of the cleats on Instagram and listed the names of all the victims in the photo's caption.

In response to Meyers Leonard's use of an antisemitic slur during a Twitch stream, Edelman posted an open letter inviting Leonard to a Shabbat dinner with him in Miami.

=== Legal problems ===
Edelman was arrested at a Halloween party in 2011 and charged with indecent assault and battery for allegedly groping a woman. On December 15, 2011, prosecutors dropped all charges against Edelman. According to a statement by the Suffolk County district attorney's office, "The evidence suggests that he approached a woman on the dance floor and took her hand briefly. Review of the videotape indicates that the physical contact between the two was fleeting, prosecutors say, and did not meet the elements of any crime."

In July 2016, Edelman was named in a paternity suit filed by Swedish model Ella Rose, with whom he had a casual relationship, naming Edelman as the father of her unborn daughter. After first contesting paternity, Edelman acknowledged it; his daughter was born in November, and he was not named on her birth certificate.

About 9:00 p.m. on January 11, 2020, Edelman was cited for misdemeanor vandalism by the Beverly Hills Police Department after he allegedly jumped on the hood of a car in Beverly Hills, California, causing damage. In April 2020, the charge was dropped by the Los Angeles County District Attorney's Office because Edelman had paid the car owner for the repair and had no criminal record.

== See also ==
- List of select Jewish football players
