= Gerald D. Aurbach =

American medical scientist

- Born: March 24, 1927; Cleveland, Ohio
- Died: November 4, 1991 (aged 64); Charlottesville, Virginia
- Education: University of Virginia (Bachelor Degree, 1950; MD, 1954)

Gerald D. Aurbach (March 24, 1927 – November 4, 1991) was an American medical scientist noted for his studies of parathyroid diseases, bone metabolism and calcium homeostasis. Aurbach was the first researcher to produce a hormone produced by parathyroid glands.

Aurbach began studying PTH as a medical student in the lab of Dr. William Parson. He continued this research as a fellow as Tufts University School of Medicine in the lab of Ted Astwood. Here, he was the first to isolate PTH using phenol extraction, and in 1959 he published a landmark paper on this discovery. In 1959, he joined the lab of William Jakoby at the National Institutes of Health, and two years later he established his own lab in the Metabolic Diseases Branch. He became chief of the branch in 1973, and remained at the institute for the remainder of his career.

He determined that parathyroid hormone acts through cyclic AMP, and demonstrated that pseudohypoparathyroidism is a disorder of the parathyroid hormone receptor complex. He also characterized several hereditary diseases related to hyperparathyroidism.

In 1973, he was named director of the metabolic diseases branch of the National Institutes of Health, and was elected to the National Academy of Sciences in 1986.

Aurbach was killed in 1991 while visiting the University of Virginia in an apparent homicide by a stone thrown from a car.

== Notable awards and distinctions ==
- 1960: the John Horsely Memorial Award from the University of Virginia
- 1968: the Andre Lichiwitz Prize from France
- 1981: the William F. Neuman Award of the American Society for Bone and Mineral Research
- 1983: the Gairdner Foundation International Award
- 1986: elected to the National Academy of Sciences
- 1985: the Edwin B. Astwood Award from the Endocrine Society
- 1988: the Public Health Service Distinguished Service Medal

=== Memorials ===
Both the Endocrine Society and the American Society for Bone and Mineral Research have established memorial lectures in his name. The University of Virginia School of Medicine established the Gerald D. Aurbach Professorship in Endocrinology, and in 2002, dedicated a new medical research building in his name.
