= Harold Grinspoon Foundation =

American nonprofit organization

- Abbreviation: HGF
- Founded: 1993
- Founder: Harold Grinspoon
- Tax ID no.: 04-6685725
- Legal status: 501(c)(3) charitable foundation
- Headquarters: Agawam, Massachusetts
- President: Winnie Sandler Grinspoon
- Chief Operating Officer: Adrian Dion
- Subsidiaries: HGF Realty LLC, The Harold Grinspoon International Foundation LLC
- Affiliations: Texas Mount Vernon Manor LP, Carriage Polo Run LLC, Storrs Polo Run LP, Pine Creek Agawam LP
- Revenue: $42,626,445 (2023)
- Expenses: $55,668,882 (2023)
- Endowment: $923,927,426
- Employees: 82 (2013)
- Volunteers: 50 (2013)
- Website: www.hgf.org

The Harold Grinspoon Foundation (HGF) is a private foundation established in 1993 and located in Agawam, Massachusetts. It is a 501(c)(3) nonprofit organization charitable organization with the goal of "enhancing Jewish and community life in Western Massachusetts, North America, Israel, and beyond."

== History ==
Real estate entrepreneur Harold Grinspoon established HGF in 1993 in Springfield, Massachusetts. Harold's wife, Diane Troderman, has been an active partner in his philanthropic activities. The foundation supports work that:

- Encourages young people to reach their academic and leadership potential.
- Promotes literacy and early childhood education. (See the PJ Library Program)
- Rewards excellence in teaching and education.
- Supports entrepreneurship among young people.

== Programs ==
The Harold Grinspoon Foundation offers a number of grant opportunities and innovative program offerings relating to many areas of Jewish life in throughout Israel, North America and Western Massachusetts.

=== Israel ===
- Sifriyat Pijama — An Israeli version of PJ Library launched in 2009, Sifriyat Pijama (Hebrew for "Pajama Library") gifts books in Hebrew each month to more than 100,000 preschoolers in about 4,000 preschools throughout Israel. In cooperation with the Israeli Ministry of Education, Sifriyat Pijama enables teachers to introduce a new book each month to their classes. In turn, each student receives the book to take home to read with his or her family.

=== North America ===
- The PJ Library — The PJ Library program (PJ stands for “pajamas”), in partnership with local communities provides families with free children's books, music, and other resources that foster Jewish learning and create a gateway for deeper engagement in Jewish life.
- JCamp 180 — A nonprofit mentoring program that provides matching funds, consulting services, and professional development programs to nonprofit Jewish summer camps. JCamp 180 provides the staff and board/committee members of participating camps with resources and support in the areas of board development, governance, strategic planning, fundraising, and technology for outreach.
- Voices & Visions — Voices & Visions released its debut Masters Series in late 2012. The Master Series is a collection of 18 images that pairs leading figures of contemporary art and design with powerful quotes from Jewish thinkers. Originally offered as a limited release, the Masters Series took off and is now being used by Jewish organizations around the world.

=== Western Massachusetts ===
- Jewish Day Schools — HGF provides substantial funding for operating costs to five Western Massachusetts Jewish day schools. It also helps the schools launch endowment and [capital campaign] strategies through [challenge grant] opportunities and development consulting support.
- Jewish Educators — Support for Jewish educators comes through the Resource Center for Jewish Education with networking opportunities, funds for professional training and teaching materials, and acknowledgement of outstanding local Jewish educators through an awards program.
- Teen & Family Education — HGF supports local synagogues and other Jewish institutions in their teen and family education initiatives.
- Arts & Culture — By working with local Jewish institutions, colleges, artists, volunteer organizers, and others in the region, HGF is investing in arts and culture programming, helping to develop inclusive and high-quality community outreach events. Its Jewish Culture Connect and Pioneer Jewish Film Festival programs are standouts in this category.
- Access Grants — HGF provides grants to individuals in order to make various experiences financially accessible. These experiences include youth group activities, Jewish overnight summer camp, Jewish preschool, Jewish day school, and trips to Israel
- Local JCCs — HGF contributed a $1.5 million challenge grant to the local Jewish Community Center endowment campaign.
- Unsung Heroes Awards—This recognition program celebrates outstanding professional and volunteer contributors to Jewish life.
- Jewish Federation — HGF proudly partners with the Jewish Federations of Western Massachusetts and the Berkshires on a variety of initiatives, including Rekindle Shabbat.

== Bibliography ==
- Huffington Post: "Jewish Literacy: PJ Library Delivers 3 Million Books To Children " (June 7, 2012)
- New York Times: "Aiming to Spread Judaism One Book at a Time" (June 24, 2011)
