= Unreal Snacks =

American food products manufacturer

- Founded: 2011
- Founders: Michael Bronner; Nicky Bronner; Kristopher Bronner
- Headquarters: Boston, Massachusetts, United States
- Key people: Kevin McCarthy (CEO)
- Number of employees: 70 (2025)
- Website: unrealsnacks.com

Unreal Snacks is an American manufacturer of confectionery and other food products without artificial flavors, color, and other non-food additives.

== History ==
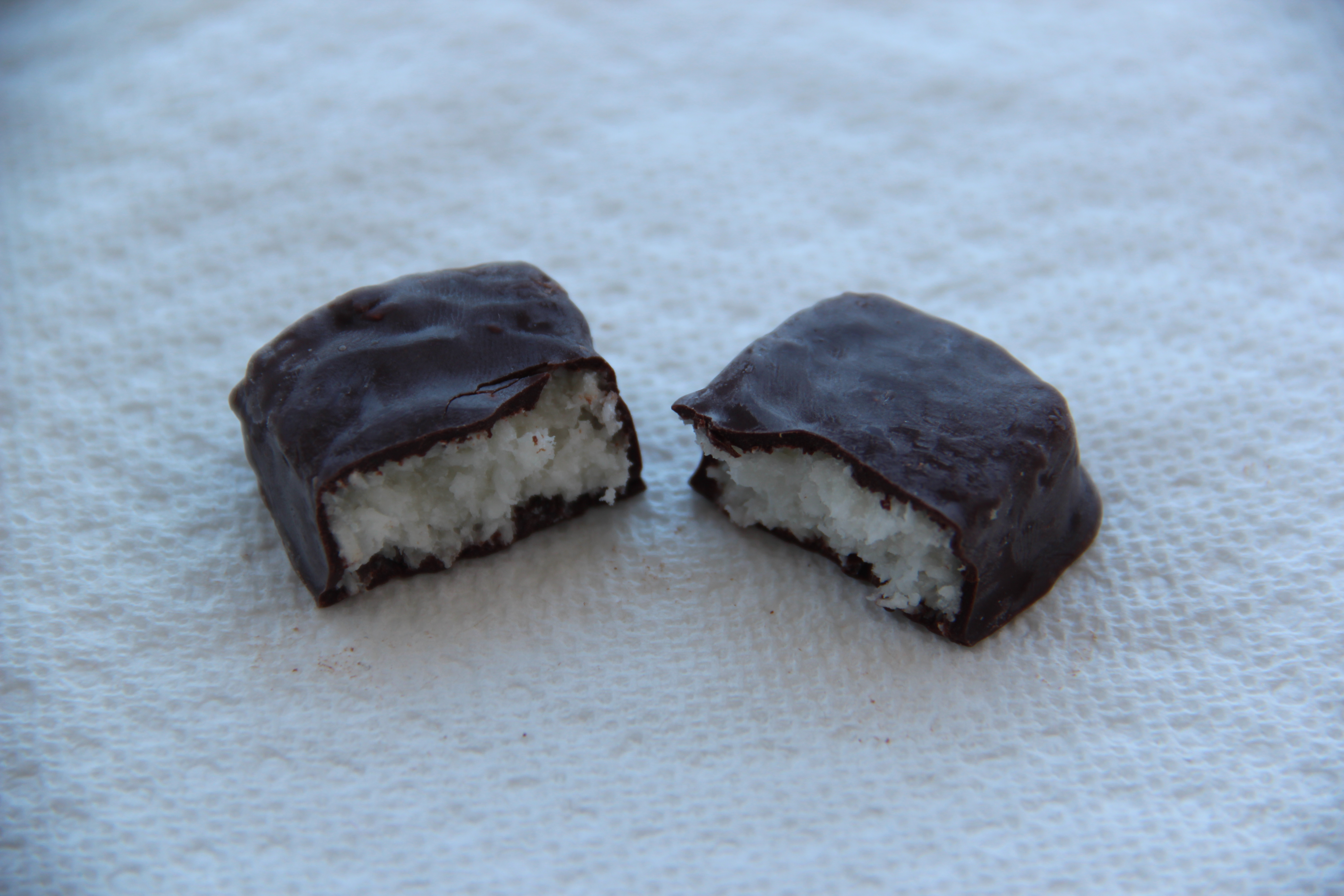
An Unreal Chocolate Coconut Bar

In 2008, two teenage brothers, Nicky and Kristopher Bronner, and their father, Boston entrepreneur Michael Bronner, began work creating all-natural candy products as an alternative to artificially flavored chocolate products available in local stores at the time. The three tested a large number of candy recipes and started the company in 2011.

By 2013, Unreal was manufacturing and selling chocolate snacks made exclusively with non-GMO ingredients, and at the time, had no partially hydrogenated oils, preservatives, artificial colorings, gluten, corn, or soy, and reduced sugar compared to similar candies of major brands. They produced several types of chocolate peanut butter cups and candy coated chocolate gems.

The company scaled too quickly and briefly shut down, relaunching in 2014 with Steve Konczal as CEO. In 2015, Unreal ran a sales campaign in which autographs by quarterback Tom Brady were hidden in buckets of Halloween candy.

In March 2017, Unreal began producing new products, including crispy toasted quinoa and almond butter. Unreal products are sold online and in various natural and conventional grocers across the United States, including Whole Foods, Sprouts Farmers Markets, Kroger, Shaw's, Market Basket, Wegmans, Big Y, and Roche Bros. By 2025, Unreal products were sold at 35,000 grocery stores and other retail establishments.

In May 2024, the company expanded into the snack category.
