= David Grinspoon =

American astrobiologist (born 1959)

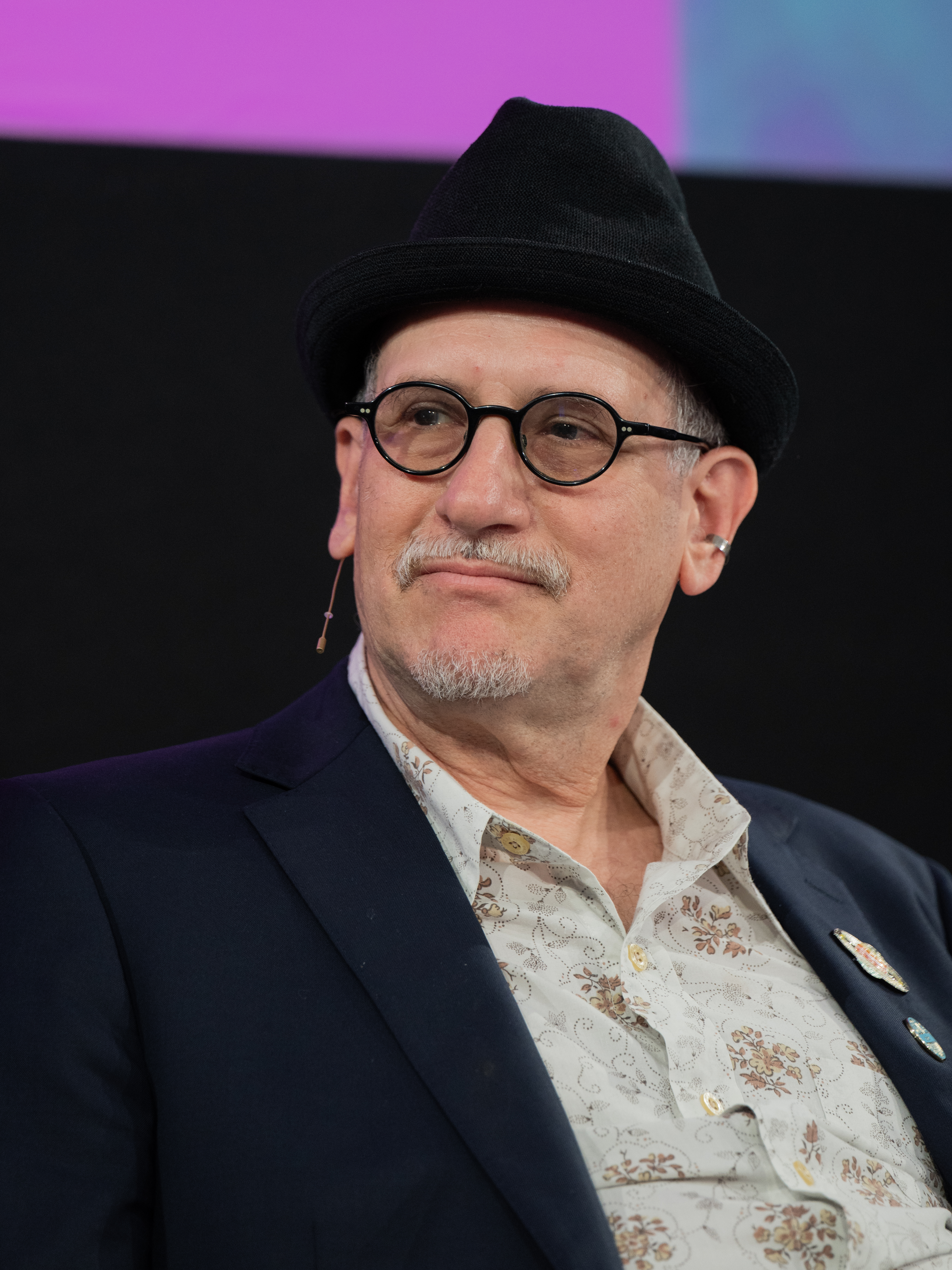
- At SXSW London, June 2026
- Born: David H. Grinspoon; December 22, 1959 (age 66)
- Education: Brown University (BA, BS); University of Arizona (PhD)
- Occupation: Astrobiologist
- Father: Lester Grinspoon
- Relatives: Harold Grinspoon (uncle), Peter Grinspoon (brother)
- Awards: Asteroid Grinspoon; Carl Sagan Medal; PEN Center USA Literary Award for Research Nonfiction; Fellow of the American Association for the Advancement of Science
- Scientific career
- Fields: Astrobiology
- Workplaces: NASA
- Website: funkyscience.net

David H. Grinspoon (born December 21, 1959) is an American astrobiologist. He is the former Senior Scientist for Astrobiology Strategy at NASA (2023-2025) and was the inaugural Baruch S. Blumberg NASA/Library of Congress Chair in Astrobiology for 2012–2013.

Currently he is Senior Scientist at the Planetary Science Institute. His research area is comparative planetology, with a focus on climate evolution on Earth-like planets and implications for habitability. He has also studied, written and lectured on the human influence on Earth, as seen in cosmic perspective.

He has published four books, Venus Revealed, which was a finalist for the Los Angeles Times book prize, Lonely Planets: The Natural Philosophy of Alien Life, which won the 2004 PEN literary award for nonfiction, Earth in Human Hands, which was named one of NPR's Science Friday "Best Science Books of 2016" and Chasing New Horizons: Inside the Epic First Mission to Pluto, co-authored with Alan Stern.

== Early life and education ==
Grinspoon was born in 1959. His father was Harvard psychiatrist and author Lester Grinspoon. He holds degrees in philosophy of science and planetary science from Brown University and a PhD in planetary science from the University of Arizona. He is the nephew of real estate developer and philanthropist Harold Grinspoon.

== Career ==
Grinspoon has served as an advisor to NASA on space exploration strategy, and as an Interdisciplinary Scientist on the European Space Agency's Venus Express spacecraft mission to Venus. He was a science team member of the NASA Astrobiology Institute Titan Team, and served as science Co-Investigator and team lead for Education and Public Outreach for the Radiation Assessment Detector (RAD) on the Mars Science Laboratory. Currently he serves on the Science Team, and as Theme Lead for Atmospheric Composition for NASA's DAVINCI spacecraft mission which will launch to Venus in the 2031 timeframe.

Grinspoon has written for many outlets, including the New York Times, The Atlantic, the Washington Post, Scientific American and the Los Angeles Times. For 15 years he wrote the bi-monthly "Cosmic Relief" column for Sky & Telescope magazine, where he is also a contributing editor. In addition, he has appeared several times as a guest, and also as guest host, of Neil deGrasse Tyson's popular podcast and StarTalk live shows. Grinspoon has been featured on many television shows, including The Universe, How the Universe works, Wildest Weather in the Solar System, Chasing Pluto (for which he was also consulting producer), NOVA, Naked Science and The Planets.

He is adjunct professor of Science, Technology and International Affairs at Georgetown University, adjunct professor of Astrophysical and Planetary Science at the University of Colorado, a former Fellow of the Institute for Cross-Disciplinary Engagement at Dartmouth College and a former Distinguished Visiting Scholar in the College of the Environment at Wesleyan University.

In 2013, he was invited to give the Carl Sagan Lecture at the fall meeting of the American Geophysical Union.

Grinspoon has lectured on the future of human civilization for the World Economic Forum, United Nations offices in several countries and at the Vatican.

== Awards ==
Grinspoon has won many awards including the 2006 Carl Sagan Medal by the Division for Planetary Sciences of the American Astronomical Society for excellence in public communication of planetary science; Alpha Geek 2007 by WIRED Magazine; the 2004 PEN Center USA Literary Award for Research Nonfiction for Lonely Planets; 1997 Los Angeles Times Book Prize Finalist for Venus Revealed; and the 1989 Gerard P. Kuiper Memorial Award at the University of Arizona. In 2018 he was awarded the Eugene Shoemaker Award by the Beyond Center at Arizona State University. In 2022 he was elected as a Lifetime Fellow of the American Association for the Advancement of Science. Asteroid 22410 Grinspoon, a main-belt asteroid, is named after him.

== Personal life ==
Grinspoon is a musician who has played guitar and composed for many bands. Currently, he is performing with Groovadelics, the House Band of the Universe and Durty Neil. He lives in Washington, D.C., with his wife.

== Notable works ==
- Venus Revealed: A New Look Below the Clouds of Our Mysterious Twin Planet (1998)
- Lonely Planets: The Natural Philosophy of Alien Life (2004)
- Earth in Human Hands: Shaping Our Planet's Future (2016)
- Chasing New Horizons: Inside the Epic First Mission to Pluto (2018)
