= PJ Library =

Jewish non-profit program

PJ Library logo

PJ Library is a program of the Harold Grinspoon Foundation, a North American Jewish non-profit organization based in Agawam, Massachusetts. It was created in December 2005 as a Jewish engagement and literacy program for Jewish families with young children.

PJ Library is modeled after Dolly Parton's Imagination Library program. PJ Library sends out free Jewish children's books and music to families "with Judaism as part of their lives." on a monthly basis by subscription. It is a North American program that is implemented on a local level. Costs are covered by a partnership between the Harold Grinspoon Foundation, members of the PJ Library Alliance, and families who “Pay it Forward” to make sure PJ Library can reach more families. In most communities there is an agency such as a Jewish federation, Jewish Community Center, or synagogue that is a key partners in making PJ Library possible locally.

== Distribution and book selection ==
In North America, PJ Library sends more than 220,000 books to families raising Jewish children each month. PJ Library is available in every zip code in the US as well as across Canada. The PJ Library books and music are available for children between 6 months and 8 years of age, depending on the available funding in each community. Older children, ages 8.5 - 11 may sign up for PJ Our Way, a choose-your-own book program. Children in the US and Canada are able to select a free chapter book or graphic novel each month and write reviews, take quizzes, and interact in a safe, moderated, online space just for kids.

In December 2017, PJ Library, in partnership with Jewish Rock Radio, launched PJ Library Radio, a free app and online streaming radio station. PJ Library Radio plays Jewish kids' music 24 hours a day with a special, curated, lullaby playlist starting around 9pm Eastern.

Globally, PJ Library programs are implemented in more than a dozen countries including Israel, Mexico, South Africa, and the United Kingdom.

Children that have been enrolled in PJ Library receive age-appropriate books highlighting Jewish holidays, values, Bible stories, and folklore. Books are selected by the PJ Library Book Selection Committee. Working with authors, publishers and editors, the committee strives to ensure that the finest Jewish books for children find their way each month into the mailboxes of all PJ Library families. Many of the PJ Library books have won prestigious awards, including the Caldecott Medal and the Sydney Taylor Book Award. Several have been named as finalists for the National Jewish Book Award from the Jewish Book Council.

== Enrollment ==
Families with kids ages 6 months through 8 years old with Judaism as part of their lives, are welcome to sign up. PJ Library welcomes all Jewish families, whatever their background, knowledge, or family make-up, or observance may be.

Through partners around North America, PJ Library also offers concerts, family outings, activities and other events as well as online Facebook groups.

== National recognition ==
PJ Library has been regularly featured in the Slingshot Resource Guide's "50 most inspiring and innovative organizations, projects, and programs in the North American Jewish community today". In April 2009, Harold Grinspoon, president and founder of the Harold Grinspoon Foundation, received the Sidney Shapiro Tzedakah Award for his work in Jewish philanthropy, including the founding of The PJ Library. In January 2010, the Jewish Education Service of North America listed The PJ Library as one of JESNA's "Picks for the Best in Jewish Education of the Decade".

== Notable books ==
- Bagels from Benny by Aubrey Davis, Illus. by Dušan Petričić (Kids Can Press, 2003 Sydney Taylor Book Award)
- Chicken Man by Michelle Edwards (Junebug Books, 1992 National Jewish Book Award)
- Hanukkah at Valley Forge by Stephen Krensky, Illus. by Greg Harlin (Dutton Children's Books, 2007 Sydney Taylor Book Award)
- The Keeping Quilt by Patricia Polacco (Aladdin Paperbacks, 1988 Sydney Taylor Book Award)
- Joseph Had a Little Overcoat by Simms Taback (Viking Press, 2000 Caldecott Medal)
- When Jessie Came Across the Sea by Amy Hest, Illus. by Patrick James Lynch (Candlewick Press, 1997 Kate Greenaway Medal)
- The Very Best Sukkah by Shoshana Nambi, illus by Moran Yogev (Kalaniot Books, 2023 National Jewish Book Award, 2023 Sydney Taylor Book Award)
- Noah's Ark by Peter Spier (Dragonfly Books, 1978 Caldecott Medal, 1978 Lewis Carroll Shelf Award, 1982 National Book Award, 1978 Christopher Award)
- The Bedtime Sh'ma by Sarah Gershman, Illus. by Kristina Swarner (EKS Publishing, 2008 Sydney Taylor Book Award)
- Soosie, The Horse That Saved Shabbat by Tami Lehman-Wilzig, illus by Menahem Halberstadt (Kalaniot Books, 2021), 2021 Holiday Highlights Book, Association of Jewish Libraries, 2021 Star Review, Kirkus
- The Always Prayer Shawl by Sheldon Oberman, Illus. by Ted Lewin (Boyds Mills Press, 1994 Sydney Taylor Book Award, 1994 National Jewish Book Award)
- Gershon's Monster by Eric Kimmel, Illus. by Jon J. Muth (Scholastic Press, 2000 Sydney Taylor Book Award)
- Marven of the Great North Woods by Kathryn Lasky, Illus. by Kevin Hawkes (Voyager Books, 1997 National Jewish Book Award)
- Flying High by Julian Edelman, Illus. by David Leonard The PJ library edition of Edelman's children's book was revised to include quotations from Theodor Herzl.

The PJ Library has also been the driving force behind updates and reprints of classic and favorite books.
