= 2018 New England Patriots season =

59th season in franchise history, sixth Super Bowl win

- Owner: Robert Kraft
- General manager: Bill Belichick
- Head coach: Bill Belichick
- Offensive coordinator: Josh McDaniels
- Home stadium: Gillette Stadium

Results
- Record: 11–5
- Division place: 1st AFC East
- Playoffs: Won Divisional Playoffs (vs. Chargers) 41–28; Won AFC Championship (at Chiefs) 37–31 (OT); Won Super Bowl LIII (vs. Rams) 13–3
- All-Pros: CB Stephon Gilmore (1st team); KR Cordarrelle Patterson (2nd team)
- Pro Bowlers: Selected but did not participate due to participation in Super Bowl LIII: QB Tom Brady; CB Stephon Gilmore

Uniform
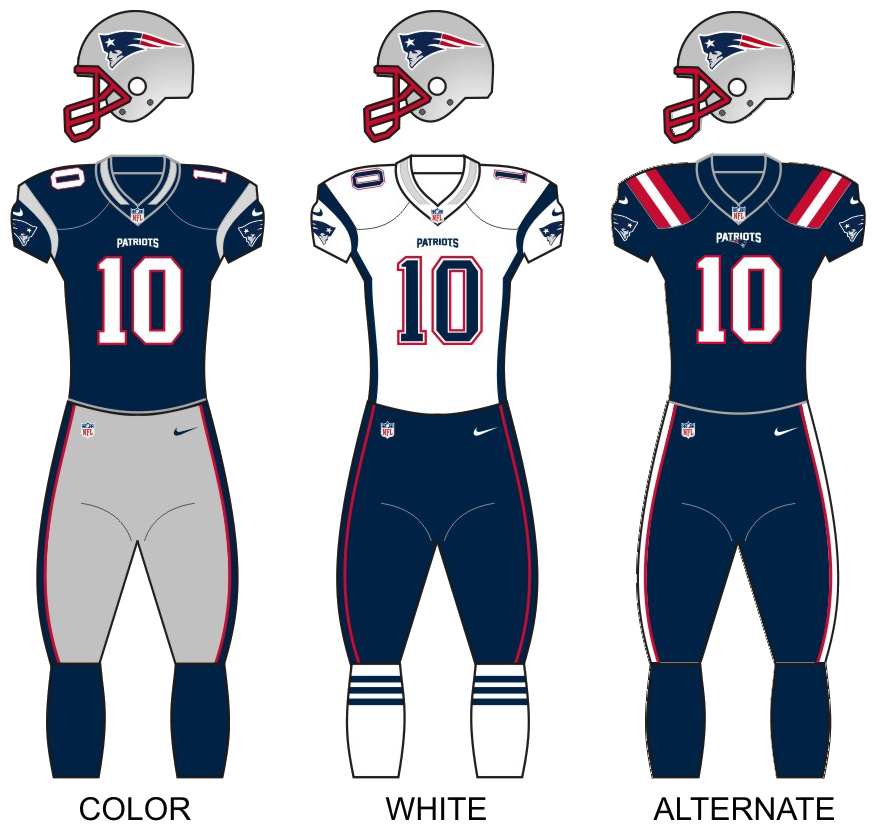

The 2018 season was the New England Patriots' 49th in the National Football League (NFL), their 59th overall and their 19th under head coach Bill Belichick. The Patriots entered the season as two-time defending AFC champions.

The Patriots' losses to the Jacksonville Jaguars and Detroit Lions in Week 2 and 3 marked the franchise's first back-to-back double-digit losses since 2002. After this slow 1–2 start, the Patriots improved to 7–2 after Week 9. Following a notable Week 14 loss to the Miami Dolphins, the Patriots could not match their 13–3 record from 2017. A defeat to the Pittsburgh Steelers in Week 15 meant the Patriots had lost five games for the first time since 2009. After a win over the Buffalo Bills in Week 16, the Patriots clinched the AFC East for the tenth consecutive season, surpassing the Dallas Cowboys (1975–1983) and the Indianapolis Colts (2002–2010) for the most consecutive playoff appearances. New England went undefeated at home with a Week 17 win over the New York Jets in which they clinched a first-round bye, and wrapped up the regular season with an 11–5 record that was good enough to give them the AFC's second seed in the postseason. Despite their five losses, the team achieved the rare distinction of going unbeaten against teams that qualified for the playoffs.

For the first time since 2010, the Patriots did not play the Denver Broncos during the regular season. It was also the last of 9 consecutive seasons going back to 2010 in which the Patriots always secured a first-round bye in the playoffs. It was, however, also the first season since 2013 in which the Patriots finished the regular season unbeaten at Gillette Stadium.

The 2018 Patriots became the second team ever in the four major American sports leagues to win at least 10 straight division titles, joining Major League Baseball's Atlanta Braves (1991–2005, excluding the strike-shortened 1994 season). The Patriots also secured their 16th-straight 10-win season, tying the San Francisco 49ers' league record streak, set from 1983–98. Notable records set during the season include QB Tom Brady achieving the record for most career passing touchdowns (including playoffs).

In the playoffs, the Patriots defeated the Los Angeles Chargers in the Divisional round, 41–28, to advance to the AFC Championship game for a record eighth straight season. The Patriots defeated the Chiefs, 37–31 in overtime, to advance to the Super Bowl for a third straight year, becoming only the third team in NFL history to appear in three or more consecutive Super Bowls (joining the 1971–73 Miami Dolphins and 1990–93 Buffalo Bills and later the 2022–24 Kansas City Chiefs). In Super Bowl LIII, they faced the Los Angeles Rams in a rematch of Super Bowl XXXVI, in which the Patriots defeated the St. Louis Rams 20–17. The Patriots won the rematch as well by a score of 13–3 to win their sixth Super Bowl, tying the Pittsburgh Steelers for most Super Bowl championships in NFL history.

As of 2026, this remains the Patriots most recent Super Bowl title they have won. This was also the most recent season that they've won a playoff game until 2025.

== Offseason ==
On February 5, 2018, the Detroit Lions hired Patriots defensive coordinator Matt Patricia to serve as head coach.

On February 6, the Indianapolis Colts announced hiring Patriots offensive coordinator Josh McDaniels as their new head coach. The next day, McDaniels abruptly rejected the offer citing personal reasons, and decided to stay a part of the Patriots' organization. The controversy surrounding this decision led McDaniels' agent Bob LaMonte to terminate their professional relationship.

== Roster changes ==
=== Free agents ===
==== Unrestricted ====
Position	Player	2018 team	Date signed	Contract
WR	Danny Amendola	Miami Dolphins	March 15, 2018	two years, $12 million
CB	Johnson Bademosi	Houston Texans	March 16, 2018	two years, $6.25 million
RB	Brandon Bolden	New England Patriots	February 24, 2018	one year, $880,000
RB	Rex Burkhead	New England Patriots	March 15, 2018	three years, $9.75 million
CB	Malcolm Butler	Tennessee Titans	March 15, 2018	five years, $61 million
SS	Nate Ebner	New England Patriots	March 13, 2018	two years, $5 million
OT	Cameron Fleming	Dallas Cowboys	March 24, 2018	one year, $3.5 million
OLB	Marquis Flowers	New England Patriots	March 22, 2018	one year, $2.55 million
DT	Ricky Jean Francois	Detroit Lions	July 25, 2018	one year, $1.01 million
RB	Dion Lewis	Tennessee Titans	March 15, 2018	four years, $20 million
WR	Matthew Slater	New England Patriots	March 20, 2018	two years, $5.2 million
OT	Nate Solder	New York Giants	March 15, 2018	four years, $62 million
OT	LaAdrian Waddle	New England Patriots	March 22, 2018	one year, $1.5 million

==== Restricted ====
Position	Player	2018 team	Date signed	Contract
SS	Brandon King	New England Patriots	March 8, 2018	two year, $2.6 million

=== Signings ===
Position	Player	Previous Team	Date signed	Contract
DE	Adrian Clayborn	Atlanta Falcons	March 17, 2018	two years, $12 million
RB	Jeremy Hill	Cincinnati Bengals	March 17, 2018	one year, $1.5 million
OT	Matt Tobin	Seattle Seahawks	March 17, 2018	one year, $815,000
TE	Troy Niklas	Arizona Cardinals	April 4, 2018	one year, $940,000
OG	Luke Bowanko	Baltimore Ravens	April 4, 2018	one year, $835,000
WR	Jordan Matthews	Buffalo Bills	April 6, 2018	one year, $1 million
OT	Ulrick John	Green Bay Packers	April 24, 2018	one year, $745,000
OG	Jason King	Baltimore Ravens	May 18, 2018	one year, $481,000
WR	Devin Lucien	Tampa Bay Buccaneers	July 23, 2018	one year, $480,000
SS	Eddie Pleasant	Houston Texans	July 24, 2018	one year, $875,000
OG	Nate Theaker	New Orleans Saints	July 24, 2018	one year, $480,000
WR	Paul Turner	New Orleans Saints	July 27, 2018	one year, $555,000
C	Brian Schwenke	Tennessee Titans	July 31, 2018	one year, $790,000
FB	Henry Poggi	Oakland Raiders	August 1, 2018	one year, $480,000
WR	Eric Decker	Tennessee Titans	August 3, 2018	one year, $1.9 million
WR	K.J. Maye	Tennessee Titans	August 27, 2018	one year, $480,000
RB	Kenneth Farrow	Los Angeles Chargers	August 27, 2018	one year, $480,000
RB	Khalfani Muhammad	Tennessee Titans	August 27, 2018	one year, $480,000
WR	Amara Darboh	Seattle Seahawks	September 2, 2018	
WR	Chad Hansen	New York Jets	September 2, 2018	
C	Brian Schwenke	New England Patriots	September 4, 2018	one year, $790,000
WR	Corey Coleman	Buffalo Bills	September 11, 2018	one year, $630,000
WR	Bennie Fowler III	Chicago Bears	September 11, 2018	one year, $705,000
RB	Kenjon Barner	Carolina Panthers	September 11, 2018	one year, $790,000
CB	Cyrus Jones	Baltimore Ravens	September 17, 2018	two years, $1,810,000
RB	Kenjon Barner	New England Patriots	September 26, 2018	
DE	John Simon	Indianapolis Colts	September 26, 2018	
RB	Kenjon Barner	New England Patriots	October 8, 2018	
LB	Albert McClellan	Baltimore Ravens	November 6, 2018	
S	Obi Melifonwu	Oakland Raiders	November 6, 2018	
OT	Matt Tobin	New England Patriots	November 7, 2018	
LB	Ramon Humber	Buffalo Bills	November 14, 2018	

Indicates that the player was a free agent at the end of his respective team's 2017 season.

=== Released/Waived ===
Position	Player	2018 team	Date released
DE	Caleb Kidder		March 6, 2018
WR	Bernard Reedy	Tampa Bay Buccaneers	March 7, 2018
LB	Shea McClellin		March 19, 2018
G	Jason King	New England Patriots	May 10, 2018
OT	Antonio Garcia	New York Jets	May 11, 2018
WR	Darren Andrews	New England Patriots	May 14, 2018
WR	Chris Lacy	Detroit Lions	May 18, 2018
WR	Cody Hollister	New England Patriots	July 24, 2018
S	David Jones	Detroit Lions	July 27, 2018
TE	Troy Niklas		July 27, 2018
TE	Shane Wimann		July 31, 2018
G	Nate Theaker		August 2, 2018
WR	Malcolm Mitchell		August 6, 2018
WR	Jordan Matthews	Philadelphia Eagles	August 8, 2018
WR	Kenny Britt		August 22, 2018
S	Eddie Pleasant	Arizona Cardinals	August 27, 2018
WR	Paul Turner		August 31, 2018
WR	Devin Lucien		August 31, 2018
RB	Khalfani Muhammad	Denver Broncos	August 31, 2018
DT	Frank Herron	New England Patriots	August 31, 2018
CB	Ryan Lewis	Buffalo Bills	August 31, 2018
DT	John Atkins	Detroit Lions	September 1, 2018
P	Corey Bojorquez	Buffalo Bills	September 1, 2018
RB	Brandon Bolden	Miami Dolphins	September 1, 2018
G	Luke Bowanko	Washington Redskins	September 1, 2018
OT	Cole Croston	New England Patriots	September 1, 2018
QB	Danny Etling	New England Patriots	September 1, 2018
RB	Kenneth Farrow		September 1, 2018
C	James Ferentz	New England Patriots	September 1, 2018
LB	Marquis Flowers	Detroit Lions	September 1, 2018
RB	Mike Gillislee	New Orleans Saints	September 1, 2018
DE	Trent Harris	New England Patriots	September 1, 2018
CB	Cyrus Jones	Baltimore Ravens	September 1, 2018
G	Jason King		September 1, 2018
LB	Harvey Langi	New York Jets	September 1, 2018
DE	Eric Lee	Detroit Lions	September 1, 2018
WR	K.J. Maye		September 1, 2018
WR	Riley McCarron	New England Patriots	September 1, 2018
CB	A.J. Moore	Houston Texans	September 1, 2018
FB	Henry Poggi		September 1, 2018
G	Brian Schwenke	New England Patriots	September 1, 2018
OT	Matt Tobin	San Francisco 49ers	September 1, 2018
S	Damarius Travis		September 1, 2018
TE	Will Tye	Philadelphia Eagles	September 1, 2018
DT	Vincent Valentine	New England Patriots	September 1, 2018
RB	Ralph Webb	New England Patriots	September 1, 2018
CB	Jomal Wiltz	New England Patriots	September 1, 2018
WR	Amara Darboh	Seattle Seahawks	September 4, 2018
WR	Chad Hansen	Tennessee Titans	September 10, 2018
WR	Riley McCarron	New England Patriots	September 10, 2018
WR	Bennie Fowler III	New York Giants	September 15, 2018
WR	Corey Coleman	New York Giants	September 17, 2018
RB	Kenjon Barner	New England Patriots	September 19, 2018
RB	Kenjon Barner	New England Patriots	October 4, 2018
CB	Cyrus Jones	Baltimore Ravens	October 6, 2018
OT	Cole Croston	New England Patriots	November 6, 2018
DE	Geneo Grissom	Indianapolis Colts	November 7, 2018
RB	Kenjon Barner	Carolina Panthers	November 13, 2018
LB	Nicholas Grigsby	Detroit Lions	November 13, 2018
OT	Matt Tobin		November 26, 2018

=== Retirements ===
Position	Player	Date retired
LB	David Harris	February 23, 2018
TE	Martellus Bennett	March 7, 2018
LB	James Harrison	April 16, 2018
OT	Andrew Jelks	July 19, 2018
WR	Eric Decker	August 26, 2018

=== Trades ===
- On March 10, the Patriots traded their 2019 third-round selection to the Cleveland Browns for defensive tackle Danny Shelton and Cleveland's 2018 fifth-round selection (No. 159 overall).
- On March 15, the Patriots traded their 2018 sixth-round selection (No. 205) to the Cleveland Browns for cornerback Jason McCourty and Cleveland's 2018 seventh-round selection (No. 219 overall).
- On March 18, the Patriots traded their 2018 fifth-round selection (No. 159) to the Oakland Raiders for wide receiver Cordarrelle Patterson and a 2018 sixth-round selection (No. 210 overall).
- On April 3, the Patriots traded wide receiver Brandin Cooks and their 2018 fourth-round selection (No. 136) to the Los Angeles Rams for their first-round (No. 23) and sixth-round (No. 198) selections.
- On April 28, the Patriots traded their third-round selection (95th overall) to San Francisco in exchange for San Francisco's fifth-round selection (143rd overall) and offensive tackle Trent Brown.
- On August 31, the Patriots traded safety Jordan Richards to the Atlanta Falcons for a 2020 conditional seventh-round pick.
- On September 17, the Patriots traded a conditional fifth-round selection to the Cleveland Browns for wide receiver Josh Gordon.

=== Draft ===
2018 New England Patriots Draft
Round	Selection	Player	Position	College	Notes
1	23	Isaiah Wynn	OT	Georgia	from Los Angeles Rams
1	31	Sony Michel	RB	Georgia	
2	56	Duke Dawson	CB	Florida	from Tampa Bay
5	143	Ja'Whaun Bentley	LB	Purdue	from San Francisco
6	178	Christian Sam	LB	Arizona State	from Cleveland
6	210	Braxton Berrios	WR	Miami (FL)	from Oakland
7	219	Danny Etling	QB	LSU	from Cleveland
7	243	Keion Crossen	CB	Western Carolina	from Kansas City
7	250	Ryan Izzo	TE	Florida State	from Philadelphia

Draft trades

- The Patriots traded Brandin Cooks and their fourth-round selection (136th overall) to Los Angeles in exchange for their 23rd and sixth-round (No. 198) selections.
- The Patriots traded quarterback Jimmy Garoppolo to San Francisco in exchange for San Francisco's second-round selection (43rd overall).
- The Patriots traded their second-round selection (43rd overall) to Detroit in exchange for Detroit's second and fourth-round selections (51st and 117th overall).
- The Patriots traded their second-round selection (51st overall) to Chicago in exchange for Chicago's fourth-round selection (105th overall) and their 2019 second-round selection.
- The Patriots traded their second and fourth-round selections (63rd and 117th overall) to Tampa Bay in exchange for Tampa Bay's second-round selection (56th overall).
- The Patriots traded their third-round selection (95th overall) to San Francisco in exchange for San Francisco's fifth-round selection (143rd overall) and offensive tackle Trent Brown.
- The Patriots traded their fourth-round selection (105th overall) to Cleveland in exchange for Cleveland's fourth and sixth-round selections (114th and 178th overall).
- The Patriots traded their fourth-round selection (114th overall) to Detroit in exchange for Detroit's 2019 third-round selection.
- The Patriots traded their fourth-round selection (131st overall) to Philadelphia in exchange for cornerback Eric Rowe.
- The Patriots traded the fifth-round selection they acquired from Cleveland (131st overall) to Oakland in exchange for Oakland's sixth-round selection (210th overall) and wide receiver Cordarrelle Patterson.
- The Patriots traded their third-round selection in 2019 to Cleveland in exchange for Cleveland's fifth-round selection (159th overall) and defensive tackle Danny Shelton.
- The Patriots traded their fifth- and seventh-round selections (168th and 270th overall) to Seattle in exchange for defensive end Cassius Marsh.
- The Patriots traded their sixth-round selection (198th overall) to Kansas City in exchange for Kansas City's seventh-round selections (233rd and 243rd overall).
- The Patriots traded their sixth-round selection (205th overall) to Cleveland in exchange for Cleveland's seventh-round selection (219th overall) and cornerback Jason McCourty.
- The Patriots traded their seventh-round selection (233rd overall) to Philadelphia in exchange for Philadelphia's seventh-round selection (250th overall) and their 2019 seventh-round selection.
- The Patriots traded their seventh-round selection (249th overall) to Cincinnati in exchange for linebacker Marquis Flowers.
- The Patriots traded cornerback Justin Coleman to Seattle in exchange for Seattle's seventh-round selection they acquired from Philadelphia (250th overall).

=== Undrafted free agents ===
Player	Position	College	Date Signed
Darren Andrews	WR	UCLA	May 11, 2018
John Atkins	DT	Georgia	May 11, 2018
Trent Harris	DE	Miami (FL)	May 11, 2018
Frank Herron	DT	LSU	May 11, 2018
J. C. Jackson	CB	Maryland	May 11, 2018
Chris Lacy	WR	Oklahoma State	May 11, 2018
A.J. Moore	CB	Ole Miss	May 11, 2018
Ralph Webb	RB	Vanderbilt	May 11, 2018
Shane Wimann	TE	Northern Illinois	May 11, 2018
Corey Bojorquez	P	New Mexico	May 14, 2018

Made regular season roster

=== Suspensions ===
Wide receiver Julian Edelman was suspended for the first four games of the 2018 season for violating the league's policy on performance-enhancing substances. Edelman, who missed the entire 2017 season due to a torn ACL suffered during the preseason, unsuccessfully appealed the suspension, and returned to the Patriots' roster for the team's Week 5 Thursday Night game vs. the Indianapolis Colts on October 4.

On December 20, 2018, Wide receiver Josh Gordon was suspended indefinitely for violating the terms of his reinstatement under the league's substance abuse policy. This is the second time Gordon was suspended indefinitely by the league.

== Staff ==
2018 New England Patriots staff
Front office: Chairman/CEO – Robert Kraft; President – Jonathan Kraft; General manager – Bill Belichick; Director of player personnel – Nick Caserio; Director of college scouting – Monti Ossenfort; Director of pro personnel – Dave Ziegler; Assistant director of college scouting – Brian Smith; Director of scouting administration – Nancy Meier; Football research director – Ernie Adams; Director of football/head coach administration – Berj Najarian; Consultant to the head coach – Bret Bielema; Head coaches {{{head_coach}}} Offensive coaches: Offensive coordinator/quarterbacks – Josh McDaniels; Assistant quarterbacks – Jerry Schuplinski; Running backs – Ivan Fears; Wide receivers – Chad O'Shea; Tight ends – Nick Caley; Offensive line – Dante Scarnecchia; Coaching assistant – Atif Austin; Coaching assistant – Cole Popovich	Defensive coaches: Defensive line – Brendan Daly; Linebackers – Brian Flores; Cornerbacks – Josh Boyer; Safeties – Steve Belichick; Coaching assistant – Brian Belichick; Coaching assistant – DeMarcus Covington; Coaching assistant – Mike Pellegrino; Special teams coaches: Special teams – Joe Judge; Assistant special teams – Cameron Achord; Strength and conditioning: Head strength and conditioning – Moses Cabrera; Assistant strength and conditioning – Deron Mayo

== Final roster ==
2018 New England Patriots roster
Quarterbacks (QB): 12 Tom Brady; 2 Brian Hoyer; Running backs (RB): 34 Rex Burkhead; 46 James Develin FB; 26 Sony Michel; 28 James White; Wide receivers (WR): 13 Phillip Dorsett; 11 Julian Edelman PR; 15 Chris Hogan; 84 Cordarrelle Patterson KR; 18 Matthew Slater; Tight ends (TE): 83 Dwayne Allen; 80 Stephen Anderson; 87 Rob Gronkowski	Offensive linemen (OL): 60 David Andrews C; 77 Trent Brown T; 61 Marcus Cannon T; 66 James Ferentz C; 75 Ted Karras G; 69 Shaq Mason G; 62 Joe Thuney G; 68 LaAdrian Waddle T; Defensive linemen (DL): 90 Malcom Brown DT; 70 Adam Butler DT; 94 Adrian Clayborn DE; 58 Keionta Davis DE; 98 Trey Flowers DE; 93 Lawrence Guy DT; 97 Ufomba Kamalu DT; 95 Derek Rivers DE; 71 Danny Shelton DT; 55 John Simon DE; 91 Deatrich Wise DE	Linebackers (LB): 54 Dont'a Hightower OLB; 50 Ramon Humber OLB; 36 Brandon King OLB; 59 Albert McClellan MLB; 52 Elandon Roberts MLB; 53 Kyle Van Noy OLB; Defensive backs (DB): 23 Patrick Chung SS; 35 Keion Crossen CB; 29 Duke Dawson CB; 43 Nate Ebner FS; 24 Stephon Gilmore CB; 21 Duron Harmon SS; 27 J. C. Jackson CB; 31 Jonathan Jones CB; 32 Devin McCourty FS; 30 Jason McCourty CB; 22 Obi Melifonwu CB; Special teams (ST): 6 Ryan Allen P; 49 Joe Cardona LS; 3 Stephen Gostkowski K	Practice squad: 64 Tony Adams T; 74 Cole Croston G; 5 Danny Etling QB; 45 Trent Harris DE; 92 Frank Herron DT; 39 A.J. Howard SS; 19 Riley McCarron WR (IR); 48 Calvin Munson OLB; 17 Damoun Patterson WR; 72 Dan Skipper T; 42 Jomal Wiltz CB; Reserve: 16 Darren Andrews WR (NF-Inj.); 51 Ja'Whaun Bentley MLB (IR); 14 Braxton Berrios WR (IR); 10 Josh Gordon WR (Susp.); 33 Jeremy Hill RB (IR); 81 Cody Hollister WR (NF-Inj.); 47 Jacob Hollister TE (IR); 85 Ryan Izzo TE (IR); 67 Ulrick John T (IR); 25 Eric Rowe CB (IR); 44 Christian Sam MLB (IR); 63 Brian Schwenke G (IR); 76 Isaiah Wynn T (IR); Rookies in italics 53 active, 14 reserve, 11 practice squad

== Preseason ==
Week	Date	Opponent	Result	Record	Game site	NFL.com recap
1	August 9	Washington Redskins	W 26–17	1–0	Gillette Stadium	Recap
2	August 16	Philadelphia Eagles	W 37–20	2–0	Gillette Stadium	Recap
3	August 24	at Carolina Panthers	L 14–25	2–1	Bank of America Stadium	Recap
4	August 30	at New York Giants	W 17–12	3–1	MetLife Stadium	Recap

== Regular season ==
=== Schedule ===
The Patriots' schedule was announced on April 19.

Week	Date	Opponent	Result	Record	Game site	NFL.com recap
1	September 9	Houston Texans	**W** 27–20	1–0	Gillette Stadium	Recap
2	September 16	at Jacksonville Jaguars	**L** 20–31	1–1	TIAA Bank Field	Recap
3	September 23	at Detroit Lions	**L** 10–26	1–2	Ford Field	Recap
4	September 30	**Miami Dolphins**	**W** 38–7	2–2	Gillette Stadium	Recap
5	October 4	Indianapolis Colts	**W** 38–24	3–2	Gillette Stadium	Recap
6	October 14	Kansas City Chiefs	**W** 43–40	4–2	Gillette Stadium	Recap
7	October 21	at Chicago Bears	**W** 38–31	5–2	Soldier Field	Recap
8	October 29	at **Buffalo Bills**	**W** 25–6	6–2	New Era Field	Recap
9	November 4	Green Bay Packers	**W** 31–17	7–2	Gillette Stadium	Recap
10	November 11	at Tennessee Titans	**L** 10–34	7–3	Nissan Stadium	Recap
11	Bye					
12	November 25	at **New York Jets**	**W** 27–13	8–3	MetLife Stadium	Recap
13	December 2	Minnesota Vikings	**W** 24–10	9–3	Gillette Stadium	Recap
14	December 9	at **Miami Dolphins**	**L** 33–34	9–4	Hard Rock Stadium	Recap
15	December 16	at Pittsburgh Steelers	**L** 10–17	9–5	Heinz Field	Recap
16	December 23	**Buffalo Bills**	**W** 24–12	10–5	Gillette Stadium	Recap
17	December 30	**New York Jets**	**W** 38–3	11–5	Gillette Stadium	Recap

Note: Intra-division opponents are in bold text.

=== Game summaries ===
==== Week 1: vs. Houston Texans ====
Week One: Houston Texans at New England Patriots – Game summary

Quarter	1	2	3	4	Total
Texans	3	3	7	7	**20**
**Patriots**	7	14	3	3	**27**

at Gillette Stadium, Foxborough, Massachusetts

- Date: September 9
- Game time: 1:00 p.m. EDT
- Game weather: 62 °F (17 °C), cloudy and cool
- Game attendance: 65,878
- Referee: Tony Corrente
- TV announcers (CBS): Jim Nantz, Tony Romo and Tracy Wolfson
- Recap, Gamebook

Game information

**First quarter**

- NE – Rob Gronkowski 21-yard pass from Tom Brady (Stephen Gostkowski kick), 11:50. Patriots 7–0. **Drive: 3 plays, 19 yards, 1:08.**
- HOU – Kaʻimi Fairbairn 42-yard field goal, 2:33. Patriots 7–3. **Drive: 4 plays, −7 yards, 1:33.**

**Second quarter**

- NE – James White 12-yard pass from Tom Brady (Stephen Gostkowski kick), 12:38. Patriots 14–3. **Drive: 10 plays, 75 yards, 4:55.**
- HOU – Kaʻimi Fairbairn 36-yard field goal, 9:01. Patriots 14–6. **Drive: 9 plays, 44 yards, 3:37.**
- NE – Phillip Dorsett 4-yard pass from Tom Brady (Stephen Gostkowski kick), 0:14. Patriots 21–6. **Drive: 8 plays, 78 yards, 1:14.**

**Third quarter**

- NE – Stephen Gostkowski 39-yard field goal, 6:02. Patriots 24–6. **Drive: 10 plays, 63 yards, 3:50.**
- HOU – Alfred Blue 1-yard run (Kaʻimi Fairbairn kick), 1:52. Patriots 24–13. **Drive: 10 plays, 68 yards, 4:10.**

**Fourth quarter**

- NE – Stephen Gostkowski 35-yard field goal, 9:48. Patriots 27–13. **Drive: 13 plays, 58 yards, 7:04.**
- HOU – Bruce Ellington 5-yard pass from Deshaun Watson (Kaʻimi Fairbairn kick), 2:08. Patriots 27–20. **Drive: 6 plays, 16 yards, 2:24.**

**Top passers**

- HOU – Deshaun Watson – 17/34, 176 yards, TD, INT
- NE – Tom Brady – 26/39, 277 yards, 3 TD, INT

**Top rushers**

- HOU – Lamar Miller – 20 carries, 98 yards
- NE – Rex Burkhead – 18 carries, 64 yards

**Top receivers**

- HOU – DeAndre Hopkins – 8 receptions, 78 yards
- NE – Rob Gronkowski – 7 receptions, 123 yards, TD

==== Week 2: at Jacksonville Jaguars ====
Week Two: New England Patriots at Jacksonville Jaguars – Game summary

Quarter	1	2	3	4	Total
Patriots	0	3	7	10	**20**
**Jaguars**	14	7	3	7	**31**

at TIAA Bank Field, Jacksonville, Florida

- Date: September 16
- Game time: 4:25 p.m. EDT
- Game weather: 97 °F (36 °C)
- Game attendance: 68,527
- Referee: Carl Cheffers
- TV announcers (CBS): Jim Nantz, Tony Romo and Tracy Wolfson
- Recap, Gamebook

Game information

**First quarter**

- JAX – Donte Moncrief 4-yard pass from Blake Bortles (Josh Lambo kick), 7:46. Jaguars 7–0. **Drive: 9 plays, 56 yards, 3:52.**
- JAX – Keelan Cole 24-yard pass from Blake Bortles (Josh Lambo kick), 2:10. Jaguars 14–0. **Drive: 7 plays, 84 yards, 3:52.**

**Second quarter**

- NE – Stephen Gostkowski 29-yard field goal, 2:45. Jaguars 14–3. **Drive: 16 plays, 83 yards, 8:20.**
- JAX – Austin Seferian-Jenkins 4-yard pass from Blake Bortles (Josh Lambo kick), 0:09. Jaguars 21–3. **Drive: 13 plays, 75 yards, 2:36.**

**Third quarter**

- JAX – Josh Lambo 28-yard field goal, 7:50. Jaguars 24–3. **Drive: 15 plays, 71 yards, 7:10.**
- NE – Chris Hogan 7-yard pass from Tom Brady (Stephen Gostkowski kick), 1:42. Jaguars 24–10. **Drive: 8 plays, 48 yards, 4:06.**

**Fourth quarter**

- NE – Stephen Gostkowski 46-yard field goal, 14:10. Jaguars 24–13. **Drive: 5 plays, 31 yards, 1:27.**
- JAX – Dede Westbrook 61-yard pass from Blake Bortles (Josh Lambo kick), 7:35. Jaguars 31–13. **Drive: 1 play, 61 yards, 10:13.**
- NE – Chris Hogan 29-yard pass from Tom Brady (Stephen Gostkowski kick), 3:40. Jaguars 31–20. **Drive: 8 plays, 75 yards, 3:55.**

**Top passers**

- NE – Tom Brady – 24/35, 234 yards, 2 TD
- JAX – Blake Bortles – 29/45, 377 yards, 4 TD, INT

**Top rushers**

- NE – Sony Michel – 10 rushes, 34 yards
- JAX – T.J. Yeldon – 10 rushes, 58 yards

**Top receivers**

- NE – James White – 7 receptions, 73 yards
- JAX – Keelan Cole – 7 receptions, 116 yards, TD

The Patriots faced the Jaguars in a rematch of the previous season's AFC Championship game. The Patriots started off well, reaching Jaguars territory in just four plays, but the drive stalled, and Stephen Gostkowski missed a 54-yard field goal attempt. With great field position, the Jaguars raced 56 yards in 9 plays, scoring on a 4-yard touchdown pass from Blake Bortles to Donte Moncrief for the early lead. After a three-and-out, Patriots' punter Ryan Allen pinned the Jaguars back at their own 16-yard line. The Jaguars took the ball and cashed in, marching 84 yards on just 7 plays, with Bortles hitting Keelan Cole on a 24-yard touchdown pass, extending the Jags lead to 14–0. After stopping the Jaguars early in the second quarter, the Patriots drove 83 yards in over 8 minutes, but were forced to settle for a 29-yard field goal, trimming the deficit to 14–3. However, the Patriots defense was gashed again, with the Jags racing 75 yards, concluding with Bortles 4-yard touchdown pass to Austin Seferian-Jenkins and a 21–3 Jaguars lead with 0:09 seconds remaining in the half. The Jags started right where they left off, taking the opening drive of the second half all the way to the Patriots 10, but were held to a 28-yard field goal by Josh Lambo. After another Patriots punt, Bottles hit D. J. Chark for a 13-yard gain to the Jaguars 49, but Stephon Gilmore forced him to fumble with Duron Harmon recovering at the Jags 46. With the excellent field position, the Patriots finally reached the endzone with Brady finding Chris Hogan for a 7-yard touchdown pass to cap off the 46-yard drive, trimming the deficit to 24–10. After a Jaguars three-and-out, the Patriots drove all the way to the Jags 28, but settled for a 46-yard field goal, making the score just 24–13. Bortles made his only real mistake on the next drive, throwing an interception to Kyle Van Noy at the Jags 25 early in the fourth quarter. The Patriots were set up perfectly, it appeared to be a vintage Brady comeback, but on 3rd down, Dante Fowler stripped Brady and recovered the resultant fumble at the Jags 32. The Patriots forced a Jaguars punt and had another shot, but went three-and-out. On the next play from scrimmage for Jacksonville, Bottles hit Dede Westbrook for a 61-yard touchdown pass, extending the lead to 31–13. The Patriots marched 75 yards in 8 plays on their next drive with Brady connecting with Hogan again for a 29-yard touchdown pass, making the score 31–20; however, by now less than 4 minutes remained in the game. The Jags ran out the rest of the clock to win the game

The Patriots lost their first-ever regular-season game to the Jaguars and ended their eight-game winning streak against them, losing to them for the first time since their 1998 AFC Wild Card defeat.

==== Week 3: at Detroit Lions ====
Week Three: New England Patriots at Detroit Lions – Game summary

Quarter	1	2	3	4	Total
Patriots	0	3	7	0	**10**
**Lions**	3	10	7	6	**26**

at Ford Field, Detroit, Michigan

- Date: September 23
- Game time: 8:20 p.m. EDT
- Game weather: Played indoors (dome stadium)
- Game attendance: 61,769
- Referee: Clete Blakeman
- TV announcers (NBC): Al Michaels, Cris Collinsworth, Michele Tafoya and Terry McAulay
- Recap, Gamebook

Game information

**First quarter**

- DET – Matt Prater 38-yard field goal, 5:55. Lions 3–0. **Drive: 12 plays, 65 yards, 7:37.**

**Second quarter**

- DET – Kenny Golladay 4-yard pass from Matthew Stafford (Matt Prater kick), 14:12. Lions 10–0. **Drive: 9 plays, 60 yards, 5:41.**
- DET – Matt Prater 25-yard field goal, 4:58. Lions 13–0. **Drive: 14 plays, 71 yards, 7:28.**
- NE – Stephen Gostkowski 36-yard field goal, 0:40. Lions 13–3. **Drive: 11 plays, 57 yards, 4:18.**

**Third quarter**

- NE – James White 10-yard pass from Tom Brady (Stephen Gostkowski kick), 10:03. Lions 13–10. **Drive: 7 plays, 52 yards, 3:31.**
- DET – Marvin Jones 33-yard pass from Matthew Stafford (Matt Prater kick), 3:45. Lions 20–10. **Drive: 10 plays, 75 yards, 6:18.**

**Fourth quarter**

- DET – Matt Prater 32-yard field goal, 12:44. Lions 23–10. **Drive: 8 plays, 61 yards, 4:14.**
- DET – Matt Prater 30-yard field goal, 1:56. Lions 26–10. **Drive: 4 plays, 1 yard, 1:20.**

**Top passers**

- NE – Tom Brady – 14/26, 133 yards, TD, INT
- DET – Matthew Stafford – 27/36, 262 yards, 2 TD, INT

**Top rushers**

- NE – Sony Michel – 14 carries, 50 yards
- DET – Kerryon Johnson – 16 carries, 101 yards

**Top receivers**

- NE – Rob Gronkowski – 4 receptions, 51 yards
- DET – Marvin Jones – 4 receptions, 69 yards, TD

After a Patriots three-and-out opened the game, the Lions marched 65 yards in 12 plays, taking over 7 minutes off the clock and facing only one 3rd down before settling for a 38-yard field goal by Matt Prater. After another Patriots three-and-out and set up with good field position, the Lions marched 60 yards in over 5 minutes to score on a 4-yard pass from Matthew Stafford to Kenny Golladay. Stafford completed all 5 pass attempts on the drive for 44 yards and the Lions didn't even face a 3rd down. The Patriots offense continued to appear lifeless with another three-and-out. Meanwhile, the Lions' efficiency shined again by slowly moving 71 yards, converting three 3rd downs and eating over seven more minutes off the clock, before settling for a 25-yard field goal, upping the Lions lead to 13–0. After 9 plays for 13 yards on their first three drives combined, the Patriots marched 57 yards to the Lions' 18, settling for a 36-yard field goal and trailed 13–3 at halftime. On 3rd down, just over a minute into the third quarter, Stafford was intercepted by linebacker Ja'Whaun Bentley at the Patriots 48. The Patriots look excellent on their next drive, racing 52 yards in just 7 plays with Brady hitting James White for a 10-yard touchdown, trimming the deficit to 13–10. The Lions continued their clock-draining game plan on their next drive, tracking 75 yards in over six minutes and converting three 3rd downs before Stafford bombed Marvin Jones Jr. for a 33-yard touchdown, pushing the score to 20–10 late in the 3rd quarter. After a Patriots' punt, the Lions drove all the way to the Patriots' 14, but settled for a 32-yard field goal, increasing their lead to 23–10 a few minutes into the fourth quarter. Two possessions later, from the Patriots' 43, Brady heaved a desperation pass that was intercepted by Darius Slay, who returned it 34 yards to the Lions' 49, but an illegal block penalty sent the ball back to the 19. After a Lions' punt, the Patriots turned the ball over on downs. The Lions closed out the scoring with a 30-yard field goal, making the final score 26–10. The Patriots drove to the Lions' 40, but the clock expired.

With their first loss to Detroit since the 2000 season, the Patriots fell to 1–2 for the first time since the 2012 season and dropped to 0-1 against the NFC North. The Lions were able to blanket the Patriots' receivers, stifling the Patriots' offense. The Lions had an excellent balanced attack with 159 yards rushing to go along with 255 yards passing from Stafford. The Patriots newest acquisition, superstar wide receiver Josh Gordon, was inactive for the game. Ironically, the Patriots' last loss to the Lions in 2000 was also Tom Brady's first ever NFL game, where he only appeared in the final seconds and completed one-of-three passes for 6 yards in a 34–9 loss.

==== Week 4: vs. Miami Dolphins ====
Week Four: Miami Dolphins at New England Patriots – Game summary

Quarter	1	2	3	4	Total
Dolphins	0	0	0	7	**7**
**Patriots**	3	21	7	7	**38**

at Gillette Stadium, Foxborough, Massachusetts

- Date: September 30
- Game time: 1:00 p.m. EDT
- Game weather: 65 °F (18 °C), sunny and warm
- Game attendance: 65,878
- Referee: Alex Kemp
- TV announcers (CBS): Kevin Harlan, Rich Gannon and Steve Tasker
- Recap, Gamebook

Game information

**First quarter**

- NE – Stephen Gostkowski 20-yard field goal, 5:28. Patriots 3–0. **Drive: 13 plays, 74 yards, 6:37.**

**Second quarter**

- NE – Cordarrelle Patterson 55-yard pass from Tom Brady (Stephen Gostkowski kick), 12:10. Patriots 10–0. **Drive: 5 plays, 67 yards, 2:08.**
- NE – James White 22-yard run (Stephen Gostkowski kick), 7:29. Patriots 17–0. **Drive: 1 plays, 22 yards, 0:07.**
- NE – Phillip Dorsett 9-yard pass from Tom Brady (Stephen Gostkowski kick), 0:18. Patriots 24–0. **Drive: 15 plays, 85 yards, 5:31.**

**Third quarter**

- NE – James White 14-yard pass from Tom Brady (Stephen Gostkowski kick), 6:49. Patriots 31–0. **Drive: 9 plays, 59 yards, 5:01.**

**Fourth quarter**

- NE – Sony Michel 10-yard run (Stephen Gostkowski kick), 13:43. Patriots 38–0. **Drive: 12 plays, 90 yards, 6:30.**
- MIA – Frank Gore 6-yard pass from Brock Osweiler (Jason Sanders kick), 2:42. Patriots 38–7. **Drive: 13 plays, 75 yards, 7:10.**

**Top passers**

- MIA – Ryan Tannehill – 11/20, 100 yards, INT
- NE – Tom Brady – 23/35, 274 yards, 3 TD, 2 INT

**Top rushers**

- MIA – Frank Gore – 11 carries, 41 yards
- NE – Sony Michel – 25 carries, 112 yards, TD

**Top receivers**

- MIA – Albert Wilson – 4 receptions, 19 yards
- NE – James White – 8 receptions, 68 yards, TD

After taking the opening kickoff, a 22-yard pass from Ryan Tannehill to Kenny Stills helped the Dolphins reach midfield. On 2nd-and-7 from midfield, Dolphins offensive lineman Daniel Kilgore was flagged for holding, killing the drive, and the Dolphins punted. Starting at their own 24, the Patriots reached as far as the Dolphins 1-yard line, but were forced to settle for a 20-yard field goal and a 3–0 lead. After a Dolphins punt, the Patriots gave it right back when Brady was intercepted at the Dolphins 36 by Bobby McCain. The Dolphins went three-and-out, but the Patriots drove 67 yards to score on Brady's 55-yard touchdown pass to Cordarrelle Patterson, extending the Patriots lead to 10–0. Both teams punted on their next drive, but midway through the 2nd quarter, Tannehill fumbled the snap with Kyle Van Noy recovering for the Patriots at the Dolphins 22. On the very next play, James White scampered to the end zone on a 22-yard run, giving the Patriots a 17–0 lead which was their largest of the season to this point. The Dolphins offense continued to go in reverse on another three-and-out. The Patriots responded by converting four 3rd downs on a 15-play, 85-yard drive, scoring with Brady's 9-yard touchdown pass to wide receiver Phillip Dorsett to go up 24–0 with 0:17 seconds remaining in the first half. After both teams punted on their initial second-half possession, the Patriots marched 59 yards in just over five minutes, with Brady capping off another touchdown drive with his 14-yard touchdown pass to White, blowing the game open with a 31–0 lead. The Dolphins reached the Patriots 45 on their next possession, but Tannehill's desperation pass was intercepted at the 10-yard line by J. C. Jackson. The Patriots hot streak continued with a 12 play, 90-yard drive, scoring on a 12-yard touchdown run from rookie running back Sony Michel, his first career rushing touchdown. After yet another three-and-out from the Dolphins, the Patriots drove to the Dolphins 32, but Brady was intercepted at the Dolphins 14 by Minkah Fitzpatrick who returned it 11 yards to the Dolphins 25. With Tannehill pulled from the game, old Patriots' nemesis Brock Osweiler led the Dolphins 75 yards in 7:30, scoring on his 6-yard touchdown pass to Frank Gore, making the score 38–7 with less than three minutes remaining in the game. The Patriots ran the rest of the clock out to end the game. With the exception of the two turnovers, the Patriots dominated the Dolphins in every aspect of the game, outgaining them 446–172 and holding the ball for 14 minutes longer. Tom Brady threw for 274 yards, three touchdowns and two interceptions. Michel had his best game of the season to date with 25 carries for 112 yards and a touchdown. White had the best day overall with 16 touches for 112 total yards from scrimmage and two touchdowns. The Patriots avoided a 3-game losing streak for the first time since 2002 or a 1–3 start for the first time since their 2001 Super Bowl-winning season.

==== Week 5: vs. Indianapolis Colts ====
Week Five: Indianapolis Colts at New England Patriots – Game summary

Quarter	1	2	3	4	Total
Colts	0	3	7	14	**24**
**Patriots**	7	17	0	14	**38**

at Gillette Stadium, Foxborough, Massachusetts

- Date: October 4
- Game time: 8:20 p.m. EDT
- Game weather: 66 °F (19 °C), mostly cloudy
- Game attendance: 65,878
- Referee: Shawn Hochuli
- TV announcers (Fox/NFLN): Joe Buck, Troy Aikman, Erin Andrews and Kristina Pink; Amazon Video: Hannah Storm and Andrea Kremer
- Recap, Gamebook

Game information

**First quarter**

- NE – Cordarrelle Patterson 1-yard pass from Tom Brady (Stephen Gostkowski kick), 8:58. Patriots 7–0. **Drive: 12 plays, 75 yards, 6:02.**

**Second quarter**

- NE – Tom Brady 1-yard run (Stephen Gostkowski kick), 12:14. Patriots 14–0. **Drive: 8 plays, 72 yards, 3:44.**
- IND – Adam Vinatieri 54-yard field goal, 8:49. Patriots 14–3. **Drive: 9 plays, 39 yards, 3:25.**
- NE – James White 6-yard pass from Tom Brady (Stephen Gostkowski kick), 1:34. Patriots 21–3. **Drive: 11 plays, 68 yards, 3:49.**
- NE – Stephen Gostkowski 45-yard field goal, 0:13. Patriots 24–3. **Drive: 5 plays, 22 yards, 0:25.**

**Third quarter**

- IND – Eric Ebron 14-yard pass from Andrew Luck (Adam Vinatieri kick), 9:48. Patriots 24–10. **Drive: 4 plays, 35 yards, 1:56.**

**Fourth quarter**

- IND – Erik Swoope 13-yard pass from Andrew Luck (Adam Vinatieri kick), 12:48. Patriots 24–17. **Drive: 10 plays, 80 yards, 4:38.**
- NE – Josh Gordon 34-yard pass from Tom Brady (Stephen Gostkowski kick), 9:19. Patriots 31–17. **Drive: 6 plays, 75 yards, 3:29.**
- NE – Sony Michel 34-yard run (Stephen Gostkowski kick), 7:08. Patriots 38–17. **Drive: 1 plays, 34 yards, 0:07.**
- IND – Eric Ebron 1-yard pass from Andrew Luck (Adam Vinatieri kick), 1:11. Patriots 38–24. **Drive: 6 plays, 60 yards, 1:52.**

**Top passers**

- IND – Andrew Luck – 38/59, 365 yards, 3 TD, 2 INT
- NE – Tom Brady – 34/44, 341 yards, 3 TD, 2 INT

**Top rushers**

- IND – Nyheim Hines – 15 carries, 45 yards
- NE – Sony Michel – 18 carries, 98 yards, TD

**Top receivers**

- IND – Eric Ebron – 9 receptions, 105 yards, 2 TD
- NE – James White – 10 receptions, 77 yards, TD

The Patriots faced the Colts on Thursday Night Football, with Brady hoping to remain undefeated against Andrew Luck.

The Patriots took the opening kickoff and marched 75 yards in over 6 minutes, scoring on a 1-yard touchdown pass from Tom Brady to Cordarrelle Patterson for the early lead. The next possession ended in a punt for both teams, but on the Colts' second possession, they drove from their own 6 to the Patriots 20, but ageless wonder Adam Vinatieri missed a 38-yard field goal attempt off the left upright. The Patriots took advantage off the missed opportunity and raced 72 yards to score on Brady's 1-yard touchdown run, extending the Patriots' lead to 14–0 early in the second quarter. The Colts drove to the Patriots 36 on their next drive and Vinatieri redeemed himself with a 54-yard field goal. After both teams punted on their resultant drive, the Patriots raced 68 yards to score on a 6-yard touchdown pass from Brady to James White for a 21–3 lead. Following this, Luck was intercepted at the Patriots 49 by Patrick Chung who returned it 2 yards to the 49 of the Colts with less than a minute remaining in the first half. With the excellent field position, the Patriots reached the Colts' 27 and took a commanding 24–3 lead into halftime after a 45-yard field goal from placekicker Stephen Gostkowski. Early in the third quarter, Chester Rogers returned a punt from Ryan Allen 33 yards to Patriots 35. It took the Colts just 4 plays to score on a 14-yard pass from Luck to Eric Ebron, trimming the deficit to 24–10. The Patriots drove to the Colts 30 on their next drive, but Matthias Farley intercepted Brady's pass at the 23 and returned it 7 yards to the Colts' 30. But four plays later, Jordan Wilkins fumbled after a 9-yard catch with Devin McCourty recovering for the Patriots at midfield. The Patriots drove to the Colts' 25, but the turnover streak continued when Brady was intercepted at the Colts' 4 by Najee Goode who returned it 16 yards to the Colts' 20. The Colts proceeded to drive 80 yards in 10 plays with Luck finding Erik Swoope for a 13-yard touchdown pass, trimming the Patriots' lead to a thin 24–17 early in the fourth quarter. However, any hope for a Colts comeback died when the Patriots marched 75 yards to score on a 34-yard touchdown bomb from Brady to Josh Gordon, widening the Patriots lead to 31–17. Any chance of a miraculous comeback died on the Colts' next drive when Luck was intercepted at the Patriots 38 by Jonathan Jones who returned it 28 yards to the Colts' 34. On the very next play, Sony Michel scored on a 34-yard touchdown burst, putting the game out of reach with a 38–17 Patriots lead. The Colts turned the ball over on downs on their next drive, but after forcing the Patriots to punt, marched 60 yards to score on Luck's 1-yard touchdown pass to Ebron. The Patriots ran out the rest of the clock to win the game 38–24.

Tom Brady completed 34/44 passes for 341 yards and 3 TDs but threw 2 interceptions while Michel ran the ball 18 times for 98 yards and a touchdown. Andrew Luck threw for 365 yards and 3 TDs but threw 2 costly interceptions.

==== Week 6: vs. Kansas City Chiefs ====
Week Six: Kansas City Chiefs at New England Patriots – Game summary

Quarter	1	2	3	4	Total
Chiefs	6	3	17	14	**40**
**Patriots**	10	14	3	16	**43**

at Gillette Stadium, Foxborough, Massachusetts

- Date: October 14
- Game time: 8:20 p.m. EDT
- Game weather: 45 °F (7 °C), cloudy
- Game attendance: 65,878
- Referee: John Hussey
- TV announcers (NBC): Al Michaels, Cris Collinsworth, Michele Tafoya and Terry McAulay
- Recap, Gamebook

Game information

**First quarter**

- KC – Harrison Butker 42-yard field goal, 9:05. Chiefs 3–0. **Drive: 8 plays, 35 yards, 3:26.**
- NE – Stephen Gostkowski 48-yard field goal, 5:18. Tied 3–3. **Drive: 8 plays, 45 yards, 3:47.**
- NE – Sony Michel 4-yard run (Stephen Gostkowski kick), 4:57. Patriots 10–3. **Drive: 1 play, 4 yards, 0:04.**
- KC – Harrison Butker 43-yard field goal, 3:25. Patriots 10–6. **Drive: 5 plays, 31 yards, 1:32.**

**Second quarter**

- NE – Julian Edelman 17-yard pass from Tom Brady (Stephen Gostkowski kick), 12:52. Patriots 17–6. **Drive: 10 plays, 75 yards, 5:33.**
- KC – Harrison Butker 24-yard field goal, 6:21. Patriots 17–9. **Drive: 11 plays, 69 yards, 6:31.**
- NE – Sony Michel 1-yard run (Stephen Gostkowski kick), 1:57. Patriots 24–9. **Drive: 7 plays, 75 yards, 4:24.**

**Third quarter**

- KC – Kareem Hunt 67-yard pass from Patrick Mahomes (Harrison Butker kick), 13:27. Patriots 24–16. **Drive: 3 plays, 75 yards, 1:33.**
- NE – Stephen Gostkowski 24-yard field goal, 7:17. Patriots 27–16. **Drive: 12 plays, 65 yards, 6:10.**
- KC – Harrison Butker 30-yard field goal, 3:36. Patriots 27–19. **Drive: 9 plays, 51 yards, 3:41.**
- KC – Tyreek Hill 14-yard pass from Patrick Mahomes (Harrison Butker kick), 0:56. Patriots 27–26. **Drive: 4 plays, 29 yards, 1:27.**

**Fourth quarter**

- NE – Stephen Gostkowski 39-yard field goal, 10:22. Patriots 30–26. **Drive: 11 plays, 54 yards, 5:34.**
- KC – Tyreek Hill 1-yard pass from Patrick Mahomes (Harrison Butker kick), 8:38. Chiefs 33–30. **Drive: 3 plays, 3 yards, 1:44.**
- NE – Tom Brady 4-yard run (Stephen Gostkowski kick), 5:25. Patriots 37–33. **Drive: 7 plays, 75 yards, 3:13.**
- NE – Stephen Gostkowski 50-yard field goal, 3:15. Patriots 40–33. **Drive: 5 plays, 47 yards, 0:35.**
- KC – Tyreek Hill 75-yard pass from Patrick Mahomes (Harrison Butker kick), 3:03. Tied 40–40. **Drive: 1 play, 75 yards, 0:12.**
- NE – Stephen Gostkowski 28-yard field goal, 0:00. Patriots 43–40. **Drive: 7 plays, 65 yards, 3:03.**

**Top passers**

- KC – Patrick Mahomes – 23/36, 352 yards, 4 TD, 2 INT
- NE – Tom Brady – 24/35, 340 yards, TD

**Top rushers**

- KC – Kareem Hunt – 10 carries, 80 yards
- NE – Sony Michel – 24 carries, 106 yards, 2 TD

**Top receivers**

- KC – Tyreek Hill – 7 receptions, 142 yards, 3 TD
- NE – Rob Gronkowski – 3 receptions, 97 yards

==== Week 7: at Chicago Bears ====
Week Seven: New England Patriots at Chicago Bears – Game summary

Quarter	1	2	3	4	Total
**Patriots**	7	14	10	7	**38**
Bears	10	7	7	7	**31**

at Soldier Field, Chicago, Illinois

- Date: October 21
- Game time: 1:00 p.m. EDT/12:00 p.m. CDT
- Game weather: 44 °F (7 °C), sunny
- Game attendance: 62,389
- Referee: Clay Martin
- TV announcers (CBS): Ian Eagle, Dan Fouts and Evan Washburn
- Recap, Gamebook

Game information

**First quarter**

- NE – Julian Edelman 9-yard pass from Tom Brady (Stephen Gostkowski kick), 11:00. Patriots 7–0. **Drive: 8 plays, 75 yards, 4:00.**
- CHI – Cody Parkey 46-yard field goal, 3:50. Patriots 7–3. **Drive: 8 plays, 35 yards, 3:44.**
- CHI – Mitchell Trubisky 8-yard run (Cody Parkey kick), 0:59. Bears 10–7. **Drive: 5 plays, 24 yards, 2:45.**

**Second quarter**

- CHI – Jordan Howard 2-yard run (Cody Parkey kick), 11:05. Bears 17–7. **Drive: 9 plays, 36 yards, 3:46.**
- NE – Cordarrelle Patterson 95-yard kickoff return (Stephen Gostkowski kick), 10:48. Bears 17–14. **Drive: 0 plays, 0 yards, 0:17.**
- NE – James White 5-yard pass from Tom Brady (Stephen Gostkowski kick), 3:58. Patriots 21–17. **Drive: 12 plays, 64 yards, 5:48.**

**Third quarter**

- CHI – Tarik Cohen 6-yard pass from Mitchell Trubisky (Cody Parkey kick), 12:04. Bears 24–21. **Drive: 6 plays, 58 yards, 2:56.**
- NE – Stephen Gostkowski 29-yard field goal, 7:48. Tied 24–24. **Drive: 9 plays, 64 yards, 4:16.**
- NE – Kyle Van Noy 29-yard return of block punt (Stephen Gostkowski kick), 5:53. Patriots 31–24.

**Fourth quarter**

- NE – James White 2-yard pass from Tom Brady (Stephen Gostkowski kick), 8:40. Patriots 38–24. **Drive: 9 plays, 96 yards, 4:25.**
- CHI – Trey Burton 11-yard pass from Mitchell Trubisky (Cody Parkey kick), 4:13. Patriots 38–31. **Drive: 6 plays, 63 yards, 2:11.**

**Top passers**

- NE – Tom Brady – 25/36, 277 yards, 3 TD, INT
- CHI – Mitchell Trubisky – 26/50, 333 yards, 2 TD, 2 INT

**Top rushers**

- NE – James White – 11 carries, 40 yards
- CHI – Mitchell Trubisky – 6 carries, 81 yards, TD

**Top receivers**

- NE – James White – 8 receptions, 57 yards, 2 TD
- CHI – Trey Burton – 9 receptions, 126 yards, TD

==== Week 8: at Buffalo Bills ====
Week Eight: New England Patriots at Buffalo Bills – Game summary

Quarter	1	2	3	4	Total
**Patriots**	3	6	3	13	**25**
Bills	0	3	3	0	**6**

at New Era Field, Orchard Park, New York

- Date: October 29
- Game time: 8:15 p.m. EDT
- Game weather: 46 °F (8 °C), partly cloudy
- Game attendance: 70,109
- Referee: Jerome Boger
- TV announcers (ESPN): Joe Tessitore, Jason Witten, Booger McFarland and Lisa Salters
- Recap, Gamebook

Game information

**First quarter**

- NE – Stephen Gostkowski 25-yard field goal, 4:46. Patriots 3–0. **Drive: 15 plays, 73 yards, 5:15.**

**Second quarter**

- NE – Stephen Gostkowski 40-yard field goal, 11:47. Patriots 6–0. **Drive: 11 plays, 63 yards, 4:53.**
- NE – Stephen Gostkowski 38-yard field goal, 5:42. Patriots 9–0. **Drive: 8 plays, 37 yards, 4:27.**
- BUF – Stephen Hauschka 47-yard field goal, 1:39. Patriots 9–3. **Drive: 10 plays, 46 yards, 4:03.**

**Third quarter**

- BUF – Stephen Hauschka 51-yard field goal, 7:39. Patriots 9–6. **Drive: 4 plays, 2 yards, 1:37.**
- NE – Stephen Gostkowski 25-yard field goal, 2:03. Patriots 12–6. **Drive: 5 plays, 22 yards, 0:52.**

**Fourth quarter**

- NE – James White 1-yard run (pass failed), 9:58. Patriots 18–6. **Drive: 10 plays, 94 yards, 4:50.**
- NE – Devin McCourty 84-yard interception return (Stephen Gostkowski kick), 5:54. Patriots 25–6.

**Top passers**

- NE – Tom Brady – 29/45, 324 yards
- BUF – Derek Anderson – 22/39, 290 yards, INT

**Top rushers**

- NE – Cordarrelle Patterson – 10 carries, 38 yards
- BUF – Chris Ivory – 6 carries, 34 yards

**Top receivers**

- NE – Julian Edelman – 9 receptions, 104 yards
- BUF – LeSean McCoy – 5 receptions, 73 yards

Devin McCourty's interception return marked the first defensive touchdown for the Patriots since the 2015 season, breaking a league-leading 40-game drought.

==== Week 9: vs. Green Bay Packers ====
Week Nine: Green Bay Packers at New England Patriots – Game summary

Quarter	1	2	3	4	Total
Packers	3	7	7	0	**17**
**Patriots**	7	10	0	14	**31**

at Gillette Stadium, Foxborough, Massachusetts

- Date: November 4
- Game time: 8:20 p.m. EST
- Game weather: 40 °F (4 °C), clear and cool
- Game attendance: 65,878
- Referee: Brad Allen
- TV announcers (NBC): Al Michaels, Cris Collinsworth, Michele Tafoya and Terry McAulay
- Recap, Gamebook

Game information

**First quarter**

- NE – James White 8-yard run (Stephen Gostkowski kick), 11:40. Patriots 7–0. **Drive: 10 plays, 59 yards, 3:20.**
- GB – Mason Crosby 29-yard field goal, 5:05. Patriots 7–3. **Drive: 14 plays, 62 yards, 6:35.**

**Second quarter**

- NE – Stephen Gostkowski 28-yard field goal, 13:30. Patriots 10–3. **Drive: 7 plays, 78 yards, 1:44.**
- GB – Davante Adams 2-yard pass from Aaron Rodgers (Mason Crosby kick), 4:49. Tied 10–10. **Drive: 13 plays, 79 yards, 6:48.**
- NE – Cordarrelle Patterson 5-yard run (Stephen Gostkowski kick), 1:57. Patriots 17–10. **Drive: 7 plays, 69 yards, 3:52.**

**Third quarter**

- GB – Jimmy Graham 15-yard pass from Aaron Rodgers (Mason Crosby kick), 11:18. Tied 17–17. **Drive: 7 plays, 76 yards, 3:42.**

**Fourth quarter**

- NE – James White 1-yard run (Stephen Gostkowski kick), 10:06. Patriots 24–17. **Drive: 10 plays, 76 yards, 4:46.**
- NE – Josh Gordon 55-yard pass from Tom Brady (Stephen Gostkowski kick), 7:20. Patriots 31–17. **Drive: 3 plays, 72 yards, 1:10.**

**Top passers**

- GB – Aaron Rodgers – 24/43, 259 yards, 2 TD
- NE – Tom Brady – 22/35, 294 yards, TD

**Top rushers**

- GB – Aaron Jones – 14 carries, 76 yards
- NE – Cordarrelle Patterson – 11 carries, 61 yards, TD

**Top receivers**

- GB – Marquez Valdes-Scantling – 3 receptions, 101 yards
- NE – Josh Gordon – 5 receptions, 130 yards, TD

==== Week 10: at Tennessee Titans ====
Week Ten: New England Patriots at Tennessee Titans – Game summary

Quarter	1	2	3	4	Total
Patriots	3	7	0	0	**10**
**Titans**	17	7	3	7	**34**

at Nissan Stadium, Nashville, Tennessee

- Date: November 11
- Game time: 1:00 p.m. EST/12:00 p.m. CST
- Game weather: 46 °F (8 °C), sunny
- Game attendance: 69,363
- Referee: Bill Vinovich
- TV announcers (CBS): Ian Eagle, Dan Fouts and Evan Washburn
- Recap, Gamebook

Game information

**First quarter**

- TEN – Jonnu Smith 4-yard pass from Marcus Mariota (Ryan Succop kick), 11:29. Titans 7–0. **Drive: 7 plays, 40 yards, 3:31.**
- NE – Stephen Gostkowski 52-yard field goal, 9:19. Titans 7–3. **Drive: 7 plays, 41 yards, 2:10.**
- TEN – Corey Davis 23-yard pass from Marcus Mariota (Ryan Succop kick), 5:58. Titans 14–3. **Drive: 9 plays, 78 yards, 3:21.**
- TEN – Ryan Succop 33-yard field goal, 2:35. Titans 17–3. **Drive: 5 plays, 34 yards, 1:36.**

**Second quarter**

- NE – James Develin 1-yard run (Stephen Gostkowski kick), 12:49. Titans 17–10. **Drive: 10 plays, 75 yards, 4:46.**
- TEN – Derrick Henry 1-yard run (Ryan Succop kick), 1:08. Titans 24–10. **Drive: 8 plays, 37 yards, 4:17.**

**Third quarter**

- TEN – Ryan Succop 31-yard field goal, 4:15. Titans 27–10. **Drive: 10 plays, 78 yards, 4:51.**

**Fourth quarter**

- TEN – Derrick Henry 10-yard run (Ryan Succop kick), 7:13. Titans 34–10. **Drive: 6 plays, 58 yards, 3:35.**

**Top passers**

- NE – Tom Brady – 21/41, 254 yards
- TEN – Marcus Mariota – 16/24, 228 yards, 2 TD

**Top rushers**

- NE – Sony Michel – 11 carries, 31 yards
- TEN – Derrick Henry – 11 carries, 58 yards, 2 TD

**Top receivers**

- NE – Julian Edelman – 9 receptions, 104 yards
- TEN – Corey Davis – 7 receptions, 125 yards, TD

This marked the Patriots' first loss to the Titans since 2002. It was also their first meeting with former players Malcolm Butler and Dion Lewis who joined Tennessee in free agency.

==== Week 12: at New York Jets ====
Week Twelve: New England Patriots at New York Jets – Game summary

Quarter	1	2	3	4	Total
**Patriots**	7	3	10	7	**27**
Jets	7	3	3	0	**13**

at MetLife Stadium, East Rutherford, New Jersey

- Date: November 25
- Game time: 1:00 p.m. EST
- Game weather: 54 °F (12 °C), partly cloudy
- Game attendance: 77,982
- Referee: Shawn Hochuli
- TV announcers (CBS): Ian Eagle, Dan Fouts and Evan Washburn
- Recap, Gamebook

Game information

**First quarter**

- NYJ – Jermaine Kearse 16-yard pass from Josh McCown (Jason Myers kick), 4:02. Jets 7–0. **Drive: 9 plays, 80 yards, 4:05.**
- NE – Rob Gronkowski 34-yard pass from Tom Brady (Stephen Gostkowski kick), 1:11. Tied 7–7. **Drive: 5 plays, 75 yards, 2:51.**

**Second quarter**

- NE – Stephen Gostkowski 34-yard field goal, 2:27. Patriots 10–7. **Drive: 11 plays, 54 yards, 4:58.**
- NYJ – Jason Myers 55-yard field goal, 0:03. Tied 10–10. **Drive: 5 plays, 20 yards, 0:48.**

**Third quarter**

- NE – Stephen Gostkowski 32-yard field goal, 8:34. Patriots 13–10. **Drive: 15 plays, 61 yards, 6:26.**
- NYJ – Jason Myers 38-yard field goal, 4:00. Tied 13–13. **Drive: 12 plays, 55 yards, 4:34.**
- NE – Julian Edelman 21-yard pass from Tom Brady (Stephen Gostkowski kick), 1:52. Patriots 20–13. **Drive: 4 plays, 75 yards, 2:08.**

**Fourth quarter**

- NE – Sony Michel 1-yard rush (Stephen Gostkowski kick), 8:54. Patriots 27–13. **Drive: 10 plays, 80 yards, 4:29.**

**Top passers**

- NE – Tom Brady – 20/31, 283 yards, 2 TD
- NYJ – Josh McCown – 26/45, 276 yards, TD, INT

**Top rushers**

- NE – Sony Michel – 21 carries, 133 yards, TD
- NYJ – Isaiah Crowell – 6 carries, 30 yards

**Top receivers**

- NE – Julian Edelman – 4 receptions, 84 yards, TD
- NYJ – Jermaine Kearse – 6 receptions, 66 yards, TD

==== Week 13: vs. Minnesota Vikings ====
Week Thirteen: Minnesota Vikings at New England Patriots – Game summary

Quarter	1	2	3	4	Total
Vikings	0	7	3	0	**10**
**Patriots**	7	3	7	7	**24**

at Gillette Stadium, Foxborough, Massachusetts

- Date: December 2
- Game time: 4:25 p.m. EST
- Game weather: 53 °F (12 °C), cloudy
- Game attendance: 65,878
- Referee: Craig Wrolstad
- TV announcers (Fox): Joe Buck, Troy Aikman and Erin Andrews
- Recap, Gamebook

Game information

**First quarter**

- NE – James Develin 1-yard run (Stephen Gostkowski kick), 9:33. Patriots 7–0. **Drive: 8 plays, 81 yards, 3:52.**

**Second quarter**

- NE – Stephen Gostkowski 20-yard field goal, 5:45. Patriots 10–0. **Drive: 15 plays, 68 yards, 8:16.**
- MIN – Adam Thielen 5-yard pass from Kirk Cousins (Dan Bailey kick), 0:15. Patriots 10–7. **Drive: 7 plays, 74 yards, 1:37.**

**Third quarter**

- MIN – Dan Bailey 39-yard field goal, 2:20. Tied 10–10. **Drive: 12 plays, 41 yards, 4:01.**
- NE – Josh Gordon 24-yard pass from Tom Brady (Stephen Gostkowski kick, 0:35. Patriots 17–10. **Drive: 4 plays, 75 yards, 1:45.**

**Fourth quarter**

- NE – James Develin 1-yard run (Stephen Gostkowski kick), 10:54. Patriots 24–10. **Drive: 6 plays, 50 yards, 3:12.**

**Top passers**

- MIN – Kirk Cousins – 32/44, 201 yards, TD, 2 INT
- NE – Tom Brady – 24/32, 311 yards, TD, INT

**Top rushers**

- MIN – Dalvin Cook – 9 rushes, 84 yards
- NE – Sony Michel – 17 rushes, 63 yards

**Top receivers**

- MIN – Stefon Diggs – 5 receptions, 49 yards
- NE – James White – 9 receptions, 92 yards

==== Week 14: at Miami Dolphins ====
Week Fourteen: New England Patriots at Miami Dolphins – Game summary

Quarter	1	2	3	4	Total
Patriots	6	21	0	6	**33**
**Dolphins**	7	14	7	6	**34**

at Hard Rock Stadium, Miami Gardens, Florida

- Date: December 9
- Game time: 1:00 p.m. EST
- Game weather: 84 °F (29 °C), mostly cloudy
- Game attendance: 66,087
- Referee: Pete Morelli
- TV announcers (CBS): Ian Eagle, Dan Fouts and Evan Washburn
- Recap, Gamebook

Game information

**First quarter**

- NE – James Develin 2-yard run (Stephen Gostkowski missed PAT), 8:13. Patriots 6–0. **Drive: 12 plays, 75 yards, 6:47**
- MIA – Kenny Stills 7-yard pass from Ryan Tannehill (Jason Sanders kick), 2:41. Dolphins 7–6. **Drive: 5 plays, 75 yards, 2:41**

**Second quarter**

- NE – Julian Edelman 2-yard pass from Tom Brady (Stephen Gostkowski kick), 14:14. Patriots 13–7. **Drive: 5 plays, 18 yards, 2:04**
- MIA – Brandon Bolden 54-yard run (Jason Sanders kick), 13:26. Dolphins 14–13. **Drive: 2 plays, 75 yards, 0:48**
- NE – Cordarrelle Patterson 37-yard pass from Tom Brady (Stephen Gostkowski kick), 10:32. Patriots 20–14. **Drive: 6 plays, 75 yards, 2:54**
- MIA – Brandon Bolden 6-yard run (Jason Sanders kick), 7:28. Dolphins 21–20. **Drive: 6 plays, 75 yards, 3:04**
- NE – Rob Gronkowski 16-yard pass from Tom Brady, 3:49. Patriots 27–21. **Drive: 8 plays, 75 yards, 3:39**

**Third quarter**

- MIA – Brice Butler 23-yard pass from Ryan Tannehill (Jason Sanders kick), 3:58. Dolphins 28–27. **Drive: 4 plays, 68 yards, 2:23**

**Fourth quarter**

- NE – Stephen Gostkowski 32-yard field goal, 6:50. Patriots 30–28. **Drive: 8 plays, 55 yards, 3:43**
- NE – Stephen Gostkowski 22-yard field goal, 0:21. Patriots 33–28. **Drive: 10 plays, 69 yards, 4:10**
- MIA – Kenyan Drake 69-yard pass play by Ryan Tannehill. Dolphins 34–33. **Drive: 1 play, 69 yards, 0:16**

**Top passers**

- NE – Tom Brady – 27/43, 358 yards, 3 TD
- MIA – Ryan Tannehill – 14/19, 265 yards, 3 TD

**Top rushers**

- NE – Sony Michel – 20 carries, 57 yards
- MIA – Frank Gore – 12 carries, 92 yards

**Top receivers**

- NE – Rob Gronkowski – 8 receptions, 107 yards, TD
- MIA – Kenny Stills – 8 receptions, 135 yards, TD

The Patriots lost to the Dolphins on a last second lateral at the end of regulation. The loss was their second straight in Miami and marked the sixth consecutive year they failed to sweep the AFC East.

==== Week 15: at Pittsburgh Steelers ====
Week Fifteen: New England Patriots at Pittsburgh Steelers – Game summary

Quarter	1	2	3	4	Total
Patriots	7	0	3	0	**10**
**Steelers**	7	7	0	3	**17**

at Heinz Field, Pittsburgh, Pennsylvania

- Date: December 16
- Game time: 4:25 p.m. EST
- Game weather: 42 °F (6 °C), cloudy
- Game attendance: 65,280
- Referee: John Parry
- TV announcers (CBS): Jim Nantz, Tony Romo and Tracy Wolfson
- Recap, Gamebook

Game information

**First quarter**

- PIT – Vance McDonald 5-yard pass from Ben Roethlisberger (Chris Boswell kick), 8:45. Steelers 7–0. **Drive: 11 plays, 75 yards, 6:20.**
- NE – Chris Hogan 63-yard pass from Tom Brady (Stephen Gostkowski kick), 6:58. Tied 7–7. **Drive: 3 plays, 77 yards, 1:52.**

**Second quarter**

- PIT – Antonio Brown 17-yard pass from Ben Roethlisberger (Chris Boswell kick), 12:07. Steelers 14–7. **Drive: 8 plays, 92 yards, 4:17.**

**Third quarter**

- NE – Stephen Gostkowski 33-yard field goal, 0:20. Steelers 14–10. **Drive: 13 plays, 63 yards, 8:15.**

**Fourth quarter**

- PIT – Chris Boswell 48-yard field goal, 2:34. Steelers 17–10. **Drive: 13 plays, 66 yards, 5:13.**

**Top passers**

- NE – Tom Brady – 25/36, 279 yards, TD, INT
- PIT – Ben Roethlisberger – 22/34, 235 yards, 2 TD, 2 INT

**Top rushers**

- NE – Sony Michel – 13 rushes, 59 yards
- PIT – Jaylen Samuels – 19 rushes, 142 yards

**Top receivers**

- NE – Julian Edelman – 7 receptions, 90 yards
- PIT – James Washington – 3 receptions, 65 yards

This would be the Patriots' last loss to the Steelers until 2025.

==== Week 16: vs. Buffalo Bills ====
Week Sixteen: Buffalo Bills at New England Patriots – Game summary

Quarter	1	2	3	4	Total
Bills	0	0	6	6	**12**
**Patriots**	7	7	7	3	**24**

at Gillette Stadium, Foxborough, Massachusetts

- Date: December 23
- Game time: 1:00 p.m. EST
- Game weather: 40 °F (4 °C), clear and cold
- Game attendance: 65,878
- Referee: Shawn Smith
- TV announcers (CBS): Greg Gumbel, Trent Green, Bruce Arians and Melanie Collins
- Recap, Gamebook

Game information

**First quarter**

- NE – Sony Michel 4-yard rush (Stephen Gostkowski kick), 7:32. Patriots 7–0. **Drive: 6 plays, 55 yards, 3:22.**

**Second quarter**

- NE – James White 27-yard rush (Stephen Gostkowski kick), 9:59. Patriots 14–0. **Drive: 5 plays, 56 yards, 2:20.**

**Third quarter**

- BUF – Steven Hauschka 35-yard field goal, 13:29. Patriots 14–3. **Drive: 4 plays, 7 yards, 1:19.**
- BUF – Steven Hauschka 41-yard field goal, 10:06. Patriots 14–6. **Drive: 5 plays, 36 yards, 1:10.**
- NE – Julian Edelman 32-yard pass from Tom Brady (Stephen Gostkowski kick), 5:05. Patriots 21–6. **Drive: 10 plays, 88 yards, 5:01.**

**Fourth quarter**

- NE – Stephen Gostkowski 24-yard field goal, 7:44. Patriots 24–6. **Drive: 6 plays, 19 yards, 3:11.**
- BUF – Zay Jones 31-yard pass from Josh Allen (pass failed), 1:08. Patriots 24–12. **Drive: 9 plays, 80 yards, 1:51.**

**Top passers**

- BUF – Josh Allen – 20/41, 217 yards, TD, 2 INT
- NE – Tom Brady – 13/24, 126 yards, TD, 2 INT

**Top rushers**

- BUF – Keith Ford – 7 carries, 33 yards
- NE – Sony Michel – 18 carries, 116 yards, TD

**Top receivers**

- BUF – Zay Jones – 5 receptions, 67 yards, TD
- NE – Julian Edelman – 6 receptions, 70 yards, TD

After receiver Josh Gordon left the team and was later suspended, the Patriots relied on their run game and defense against Buffalo. The Pats clinched their 10th straight AFC East title with the win, along with Miami's loss to Jacksonville, improving their record to 10–5, and for the second time this season, denied a 3-game losing streak for the first time since 2002. With the Houston Texans' loss to the Philadelphia Eagles, the Patriots moved to the #2 seed in the AFC, and would have the chance to secure a playoff bye with a win in the following week's game. Tom Brady eclipsed 4,000 yards at the same time as Philip Rivers, becoming the third and fourth quarterback in NFL history to reach 4,000 yards in 10 seasons or more, joining Peyton Manning & Drew Brees.

==== Week 17: vs. New York Jets ====
Week Seventeen: New York Jets at New England Patriots – Game summary

Quarter	1	2	3	4	Total
Jets	3	0	0	0	**3**
**Patriots**	7	14	7	10	**38**

at Gillette Stadium, Foxborough, Massachusetts

- Date: December 30
- Game time: 1:00 p.m. EST
- Game weather: 33 °F (1 °C), sunny and cold
- Game attendance: 65,878
- Referee: Walt Coleman
- TV announcers (CBS): Ian Eagle, Dan Fouts and Evan Washburn
- Recap, Gamebook

Game information

**First quarter**

- NE – James White 17-yard pass from Tom Brady (Stephen Gostkowski kick), 5:16. Patriots 7–0. **Drive: 9 plays, 59 yards, 5:00.**
- NYJ – Jason Myers 40-yard field goal, 0:54. Patriots 7–3. **Drive: 10 plays, 56 yards, 4:22.**

**Second quarter**

- NE – Rex Burkhead 18-yard pass from Tom Brady (Stephen Gostkowski kick), 12:53. Patriots 14–3. **Drive: 7 plays, 75 yards, 3:01.**
- NE – Phillip Dorsett 9-yard pass from Tom Brady (Stephen Gostkowski kick), 11:03. Patriots 21–3. **Drive: 5 plays, 8 yards, 1:40.**

**Third quarter**

- NE – Kyle Van Noy 46-yard fumble return (Stephen Gostkowski kick), 10:48. Patriots 28–3.

**Fourth quarter**

- NE – Stephen Gostkowski 38-yard field goal, 9:40. Patriots 31–3. **Drive: 6 plays, 45 yards, 2:53.**
- NE – Julian Edelman 5-yard pass from Tom Brady (Stephen Gostkowski kick), 3:26. Patriots 38–3. **Drive: 10 plays, 64 yards, 5:06.**

**Top passers**

- NYJ – Sam Darnold – 16/28, 167 yards
- NE – Tom Brady – 24/33, 250 yards, 4 TD

**Top rushers**

- NYJ – Elijah McGuire – 18 carries, 41 yards
- NE – Sony Michel – 14 carries, 50 yards

**Top receivers**

- NYJ – Deontay Burnett – 5 receptions, 73 yards
- NE – Julian Edelman – 5 receptions, 69 yards, TD

The Patriots secured their 9th consecutive first round bye. However, due to the Chiefs win over the Raiders, the Patriots clinched the #2 seed instead of the #1 seed for the first time since 2015.

=== Standings ===
==== Division ====
AFC East
	W	L	T	PCT	DIV	CONF	PF	PA	STK
^{(2)} New England Patriots	11	5	0	.688	5–1	8–4	436	325	W2
Miami Dolphins	7	9	0	.438	4–2	6–6	319	433	L3
Buffalo Bills	6	10	0	.375	2–4	4–8	269	374	W1
New York Jets	4	12	0	.250	1–5	3–9	333	441	L3

==== Conference ====
AFC
#	Team	Division	W	L	T	PCT	DIV	CONF	SOS	SOV	STK
**Division leaders**
1 (Note: Kansas City finished ahead of LA Chargers in the AFC West based on division record, claiming the No. 1 seed.)	Kansas City Chiefs	West	12	4	0	.750	5–1	10–2	.480	.401	W1
2 (Note: New England claimed the No. 2 seed over Houston based on head-to-head victory.)	New England Patriots	East	11	5	0	.688	5–1	8–4	.482	.494	W2
3	Houston Texans	South	11	5	0	.688	4–2	9–3	.471	.435	W1
4	Baltimore Ravens	North	10	6	0	.625	3–3	8–4	.496	.450	W3
**Wild Cards**
5	Los Angeles Chargers	West	12	4	0	.750	4–2	9–3	.477	.422	W1
6	Indianapolis Colts	South	10	6	0	.625	4–2	7–5	.465	.456	W4
**Did not qualify for the postseason**
7	Pittsburgh Steelers	North	9	6	1	.594	4–1–1	6–5–1	.504	.448	W1
8	Tennessee Titans	South	9	7	0	.563	3–3	5–7	.520	.465	L1
9	Cleveland Browns	North	7	8	1	.469	3–2–1	5–6–1	.516	.411	L1
10	Miami Dolphins	East	7	9	0	.438	4–2	6–6	.469	.446	L3
11 (Note: Denver finished ahead of Cincinnati and Buffalo based on strength of victory. Cincinnati finished ahead of Buffalo based on record vs. common opponents. Cincinnati's cumulative record against Baltimore, Indianapolis, the Los Angeles Chargers and Miami was 3–2, compared to Buffalo's 1–4 cumulative record against the same four teams.)	Denver Broncos	West	6	10	0	.375	2–4	4–8	.523	.464	L4
12	Cincinnati Bengals	North	6	10	0	.375	1–5	4–8	.535	.448	L2
13	Buffalo Bills	East	6	10	0	.375	2–4	4–8	.523	.411	W1
14	Jacksonville Jaguars	South	5	11	0	.313	1–5	4–8	.549	.463	L1
15 (Note: NY Jets finished ahead of Oakland based on strength of victory.)	New York Jets	East	4	12	0	.250	1–5	3–9	.506	.438	L3
16	Oakland Raiders	West	4	12	0	.250	1–5	3–9	.547	.406	L1
**Tiebreakers** (Note: When breaking ties for three or more teams under the NFL's rules, they are first broken within divisions, then comparing only the highest ranked remaining team from each division.)

== Postseason ==
=== Schedule ===
Playoff round	Date	Opponent (seed)	Result	Record	Venue	NFL.com recap
Wild Card	First-round bye					
Divisional	January 13, 2019	Los Angeles Chargers (5)	W 41–28	1–0	Gillette Stadium	Recap
AFC Championship	January 20, 2019	at Kansas City Chiefs (1)	W 37–31 (OT)	2–0	Arrowhead Stadium	Recap
Super Bowl LIII	February 3, 2019	vs. Los Angeles Rams (N2)	W 13–3	3–0	Mercedes-Benz Stadium	Recap

=== Game summaries ===
==== AFC Divisional Playoffs: vs. (5) Los Angeles Chargers ====
AFC Divisional Playoffs: (5) Los Angeles Chargers at (2) New England Patriots – Game summary

Quarter	1	2	3	4	Total
Chargers	7	0	7	14	28
Patriots	14	21	3	3	41

at Gillette Stadium, Foxborough, Massachusetts

- Date: January 13, 2019
- Game time: 1:05 p.m. EST
- Game weather: 26 °F (−3 °C), sunny and cold
- Game attendance: 65,878
- Referee: Ronald Torbert
- TV announcers (CBS): Jim Nantz, Tony Romo, Tracy Wolfson and Jay Feely
- Recap, Gamebook

Game information

First quarter

- NE – Sony Michel 1-yard run (Stephen Gostkowski kick), 7:49. Patriots 7–0. Drive: 14 plays, 83 yards, 7:11.
- LAC – Keenan Allen 43-yard pass from Philip Rivers (Michael Badgley kick), 4:56. Tied 7–7. Drive: 6 plays, 67 yards, 2:53.
- NE – Sony Michel 14-yard run (Stephen Gostkowski kick), 1:35. Patriots 14–7. Drive: 7 plays, 67 yards, 3:21.

Second quarter

- NE – Phillip Dorsett 15-yard pass from Tom Brady (Stephen Gostkowski kick), 12:17. Patriots 21–7. Drive: 8 plays, 58 yards, 3:07.
- NE – Rex Burkhead 6-yard run (Stephen Gostkowski kick), 6:04. Patriots 28–7. Drive: 6 plays, 87 yards, 3:08.
- NE – Sony Michel 5-yard run (Stephen Gostkowski kick), 1:43. Patriots 35–7. Drive: 4 plays, 35 yards, 1:40.

Third quarter

- NE – Stephen Gostkowski 28-yard field goal, 6:31. Patriots 38–7. Drive: 14 plays, 57 yards, 7:22.
- LAC – Melvin Gordon 1-yard run (Michael Badgley kick), 1:16. Patriots 38–14. Drive: 10 plays, 72 yards, 5:15.

Fourth quarter

- NE – Stephen Gostkowski 30-yard field goal, 12:23. Patriots 41–14. Drive: 8 plays, 63 yards, 3:53.
- LAC – Virgil Green 1-yard pass from Philip Rivers (Philip Rivers–Keenan Allen pass), 7:38. Patriots 41–22. Drive: 6 plays, 80 yards, 2:01.
- LAC – Antonio Gates 8-yard pass from Philip Rivers (pass failed), 0:59. Patriots 41–28. Drive: 12 plays, 80 yards, 2:00.

Top passers

- LAC – Philip Rivers – 25/51, 331 yards, 3 TD, INT
- NE – Tom Brady – 34/44, 343 yards, TD

Top rushers

- LAC – Melvin Gordon – 9 rushes, 15 yards, TD
- NE – Sony Michel – 24 rushes, 129 yards, 3 TD

Top receivers

- LAC – Tyrell Williams – 5 receptions, 94 yards
- NE – Julian Edelman – 9 receptions, 151 yards

This would be the Patriots' final matchup against Phillip Rivers.

==== AFC Championship: at (1) Kansas City Chiefs ====
AFC Championship: (2) New England Patriots at (1) Kansas City Chiefs – Game summary

Quarter	1	2	3	4	OT	Total
Patriots	7	7	3	14	6	37
Chiefs	0	0	7	24	0	31

at Arrowhead Stadium, Kansas City, Missouri

- Date: January 20, 2019
- Game time: 6:40 p.m. EST/5:40 p.m. CST
- Game weather: 19 °F (−7 °C), cloudy
- Game attendance: 77,034
- Referee: Clete Blakeman
- TV announcers (CBS): Jim Nantz, Tony Romo, Tracy Wolfson, Evan Washburn and Jay Feely
- Recap, Gamebook

Game information

First quarter

- NE — Sony Michel 6-yard run, (Stephen Gostkowski kick) 6:55. Patriots 7–0. Drive: 15 plays, 80 yards, 8:05

Second quarter

- NE — Phillip Dorsett 29-yard pass from Tom Brady (Stephen Gostowski kick), 0:27. Patriots 14–0. Drive: 8 plays, 90 yards, 2:41

Third quarter

- KC — Travis Kelce 12-yard pass from Patrick Mahomes (Harrison Butker kick), 12:56. Patriots 14–7. Drive: 4 plays, 74 yards, 2:04
- NE — Stephen Gostowski 47-yard field goal, 4:07. Patriots 17–7. Drive: 6 plays, 8 yards, 3:36.

Fourth quarter

- KC — Damien Williams 1-yard pass from Patrick Mahomes (Harrison Butker kick), 14:51. Patriots 17–14 . Drive: 9 plays, 75 yards, 4:11
- KC – Damien Williams 23-yard pass from Patrick Mahomes (Harrison Butker kick), 7:45. Chiefs 21–17. Drive: 2 plays, 23 yards, 0:10.
- NE – Sony Michel 10-yard run (Stephen Gostkowski kick), 3:32. Patriots 24–21. Drive: 10 plays, 75 yards, 4:13.
- KC – Damien Williams 2-yard run (Harrison Butker kick), 2:03. Chiefs 28–24. Drive: 5 plays, 68 yards, 1:29.
- NE – Rex Burkhead 4-yard run (Stephen Gostkowski kick), 0:39. Patriots 31–28. Drive: 6 plays, 65 yards, 1:24.
- KC – Harrison Butker 39-yard field goal, 0:11. Tied 31–31. Drive: 4 plays, 48 yards, 0:31.

Overtime

- NE – Rex Burkhead 2-yard run, 10:10. Patriots 37–31. Drive: 13 plays, 75 yards, 4:52.

Top passers

- NE – Tom Brady – 30/46, 348 yards, TD, 2 INT
- KC – Patrick Mahomes – 16/31, 295 yards, 3 TD

Top rushers

- NE – Sony Michel – 29 rushes, 113 yards, 2 TD
- KC – Damien Williams – 10 rushes, 30 yards, TD

Top receivers

- NE – Julian Edelman – 7 receptions, 96 yards
- KC – Sammy Watkins – 4 receptions, 114 yards

With the overtime win, the Patriots won their 3rd consecutive AFC Championship game and advanced to the Super Bowl for the 5th time since 2011. This would mark their last appearance in the AFC Championship until 2025.

==== Super Bowl LIII: vs. (N2) Los Angeles Rams ====
Super Bowl LIII: (A2) New England Patriots vs. (N2) Los Angeles Rams – Game summary

Quarter	1	2	3	4	Total
Patriots	0	3	0	10	13
Rams	0	0	3	0	3

at Mercedes-Benz Stadium, Atlanta, Georgia

- Date: February 3, 2019
- Game time: 6:30 p.m. EST
- Game weather: Played indoors (retractable roof closed)
- Game attendance: 70,081
- Referee: John Parry
- TV announcers (CBS): Jim Nantz, Tony Romo, Tracy Wolfson, Evan Washburn and Jay Feely
- Recap, Gamebook

Game information

First quarter

- No scoring plays.

Second quarter

- NE — Stephen Gostkowski 42-yard field goal, 10:29. Patriots 3–0. Drive: 7 plays, 39 yards, 3:29.

Third quarter

- LAR — Greg Zuerlein 53-yard field goal, 2:11. Tied 3–3. Drive: 10 plays, 42 yards, 4:22.

Fourth quarter

- NE — Sony Michel 2-yard run, (Stephen Gostkowski kick) 7:00. Patriots 10–3. Drive: 5 plays, 69 yards, 2:49.
- NE — Stephen Gostowski 41-yard field goal, 1:12. Patriots 13–3. Drive: 9 plays, 72 yards, 3:05.

Top passers

- NE – Tom Brady – 21/35, 262 yards, INT
- LAR – Jared Goff – 19/38, 229 yards, INT

Top rushers

- NE – Sony Michel – 18 rushes, 94 yards, TD
- LAR – Todd Gurley – 10 rushes, 35 yards

Top receivers

- NE – Julian Edelman – 10 receptions, 141 yards
- LAR – Brandin Cooks – 8 receptions, 120 yards

With their second Super Bowl win over the Rams (7th straight since 2001), the Patriots tied the Steelers for the most Super Bowls by a team with 6. This was also the Patriots second Super Bowl win in 3 years and 3rd in the 2010s. As of 2025, this is the Patriots most recent Super Bowl victory along with their last win over the Rams. This would also the Patriots last playoff win until 2025.
