= John Simon (linebacker) =

American football player (born 1990)

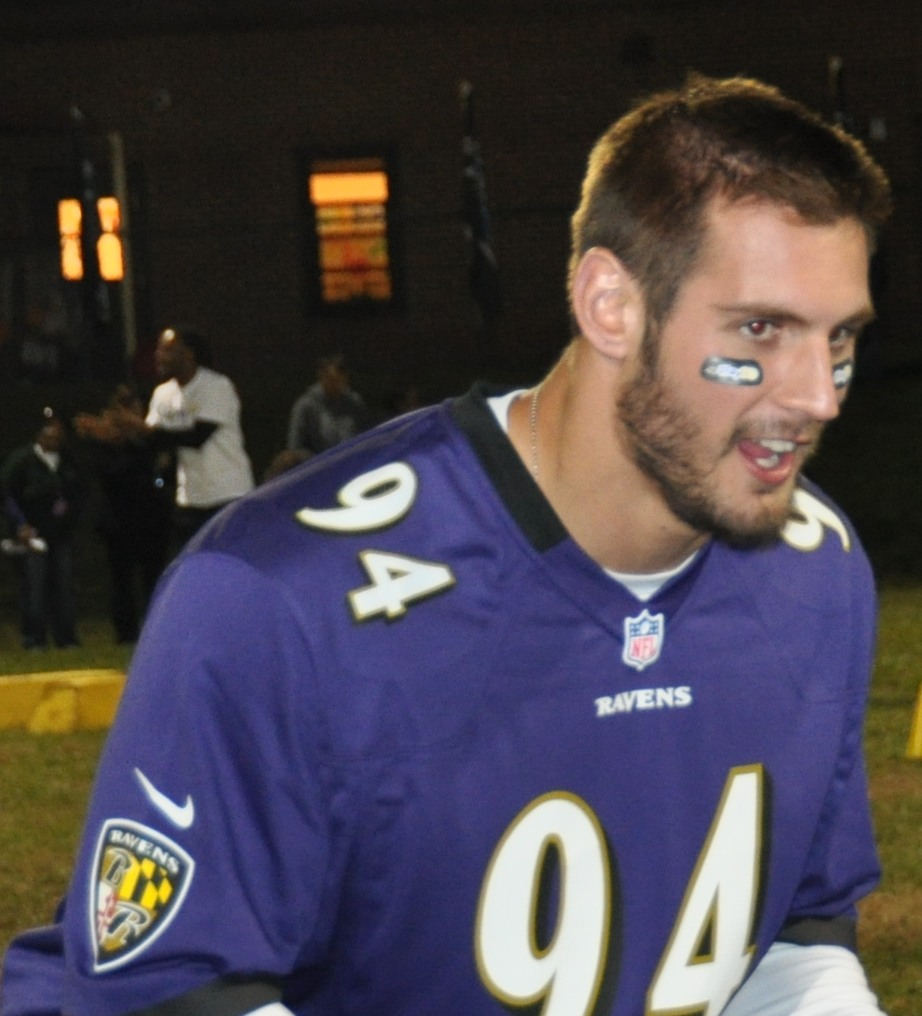
- Simon with the Baltimore Ravens in 2013

No. 94, 51, 55, 59, 38
- Position: Linebacker

Personal information
- Born: October 14, 1990 (age 36); Youngstown, Ohio, U.S.
- Listed height: 6 ft 2 in (1.88 m)
- Listed weight: 260 lb (118 kg)

Career information
- High school: Cardinal Mooney (Youngstown)
- College: Ohio State (2009–2012)
- NFL draft: 2013: 4th round, 129th overall pick

Career history
- Baltimore Ravens (2013); Houston Texans (2014–2016); Indianapolis Colts (2017); New England Patriots (2018–2020); Tennessee Titans (2021); Pittsburgh Steelers (2021)

Awards and highlights
- Super Bowl champion (LIII); Bill Willis Trophy (2012); Third-team All-American (2011); Big Ten Defensive Player of the Year (2012); Big Ten Defensive Lineman of the Year (2012); 2× First-team All-Big Ten (2011, 2012)

Career NFL statistics
- Total tackles: 283
- Sacks: 21
- Forced fumbles: 2
- Fumble recoveries: 1
- Pass deflections: 11
- Interceptions: 2
- Defensive touchdowns: 1
- Stats at Pro Football Reference

John Simon (born October 14, 1990) is an American former professional football player who was a linebacker in the National Football League (NFL). He played college football for the Ohio State Buckeyes, and was selected by the Baltimore Ravens in the fourth round of the 2013 NFL draft. He also played for the Houston Texans, Indianapolis Colts, New England Patriots, Tennessee Titans, and Pittsburgh Steelers.

== Early life ==
Simon was born in Youngstown, Ohio. He played high school football for the Mooney Cardinals of Cardinal Mooney High School in Youngstown, Ohio. Ranked by Rivals.com as the No. 36 defensive tackle in the class of 2009, Simon chose Ohio State over offers from Nebraska, Notre Dame and Pittsburgh. He played in the 2009 U.S. Army All-American Bowl.

== College career ==
Simon attended Ohio State University, and played for the Ohio State Buckeyes football team from 2009 to 2012. As a senior in 2012, he was named the Big Ten Conference Defensive Player of the Year, and received first-team All-Big Ten honors. He was also named a third-team All-American selection by the Associated Press. He finished his career with 154 tackles and 20.5 quarterback sacks.

== Professional career ==
=== Baltimore Ravens ===
Simon was selected by the Baltimore Ravens in the fourth round, with the 129th overall pick, of the 2013 NFL draft. He signed a four-year, $2.545 million contract on May 21, 2013. On August 30, 2014, Simon was waived by the Ravens and was signed to the practice squad the next day.

=== Houston Texans ===
On October 7, 2014, Simon was signed by the Houston Texans off the Ravens' practice squad. On October 9, 2014, Simon recorded his first NFL sack against the Indianapolis Colts. On March 16, 2016, Simon signed a restricted free agent tender with the Texans.

In Simon's third season, he recorded 53 tackles, 1 fumble recovery and 5 sacks.

=== Indianapolis Colts ===
On March 10, 2017, the Indianapolis Colts signed Simon to a three-year, $13.5 million contract. He started nine games for the Colts in 2017 before being placed on injured reserve on December 5, 2017, with a shoulder injury.

On September 1, 2018, Simon was released by the Colts.

=== New England Patriots ===
On September 26, 2018, Simon was signed by the New England Patriots. Simon finished the 2018 season with 17 tackles (8 solo) and 2 sacks. Simon helped the Patriots win Super Bowl LIII where they beat the Los Angeles Rams 13–3.

On March 13, 2019, Simon signed a two-year contract extension with the Patriots. In week 2 against the Miami Dolphins, Simon recorded his first sack of the season in the 43–0 win. In week 6 against the New York Giants, Simon recorded an interception off a pass from Daniel Jones that was tipped by teammate Stephon Gilmore in the 35–14 win. In week 7 against the New York Jets, Simon recorded a strip sack on Sam Darnold which was recovered by teammate Kyle Van Noy in the 33–0 win.

=== Tennessee Titans ===
On July 25, 2021, Simon signed with the Tennessee Titans. He was released on August 29, 2021. He was re-signed to the practice squad on October 5. He was promoted to the active roster on October 9. He was released on November 6. He re-signed with the Titans on November 23. He was waived on December 6.

=== Pittsburgh Steelers ===
On December 13, 2021, Simon signed with the Pittsburgh Steelers practice squad. He signed a reserve/future contract with the Steelers on January 27, 2022. He was released on May 16, 2022.

== NFL career statistics ==
Legend
**Bold**	Career high

=== Regular season ===
Year	Team	Games		Tackles					Interceptions					Fumbles			
Year	Team	GP	GS	Cmb	Solo	Ast	Sck	TFL	Int	Yds	TD	Lng	PD	FF	FR	Yds	TD
2013	BAL	7	0	4	4	0	0.0	0	0	0	0	0	0	0	0	0	0
2014	HOU	11	0	12	7	5	1.5	2	0	0	0	0	1	0	0	0	0
2015	HOU	**16**	8	**53**	**39**	14	**5.0**	3	0	0	0	0	0	0	**1**	0	0
2016	HOU	11	5	51	32	**19**	3.5	4	0	0	0	0	2	**1**	0	0	0
2017	IND	9	9	43	28	15	3.0	**7**	**1**	**26**	**1**	**26**	1	0	0	0	0
2018	NWE	11	2	17	8	9	2.0	2	0	0	0	0	0	0	0	0	0
2019	NWE	**16**	12	44	28	16	4.0	3	**1**	6	0	6	**4**	**1**	0	0	0
2020	NWE	**16**	**16**	**53**	34	**19**	2.0	4	0	0	0	0	3	0	0	0	0
2021	TEN	2	0	6	4	2	0.0	0	0	0	0	0	0	0	0	0	0
2021	PIT	1	0	0	0	0	0.0	0	0	0	0	0	0	0	0	0	0
		100	52	283	184	99	21.0	25	2	32	1	26	11	2	1	0	0

=== Playoffs ===
Year	Team	Games		Tackles					Interceptions					Fumbles			
Year	Team	GP	GS	Cmb	Solo	Ast	Sck	TFL	Int	Yds	TD	Lng	PD	FF	FR	Yds	TD
2015	HOU	1	0	**8**	**5**	**3**	0.0	**1**	0	0	0	0	0	0	0	0	0
2018	NWE	**3**	**1**	4	1	**3**	**0.5**	**1**	0	0	0	0	**1**	0	0	0	0
2019	NWE	1	**1**	5	4	1	0.0	**1**	0	0	0	0	0	0	0	0	0
		5	2	17	10	7	0.5	3	0	0	0	0	1	0	0	0	0
