= James Develin =

American football player (born 1988)

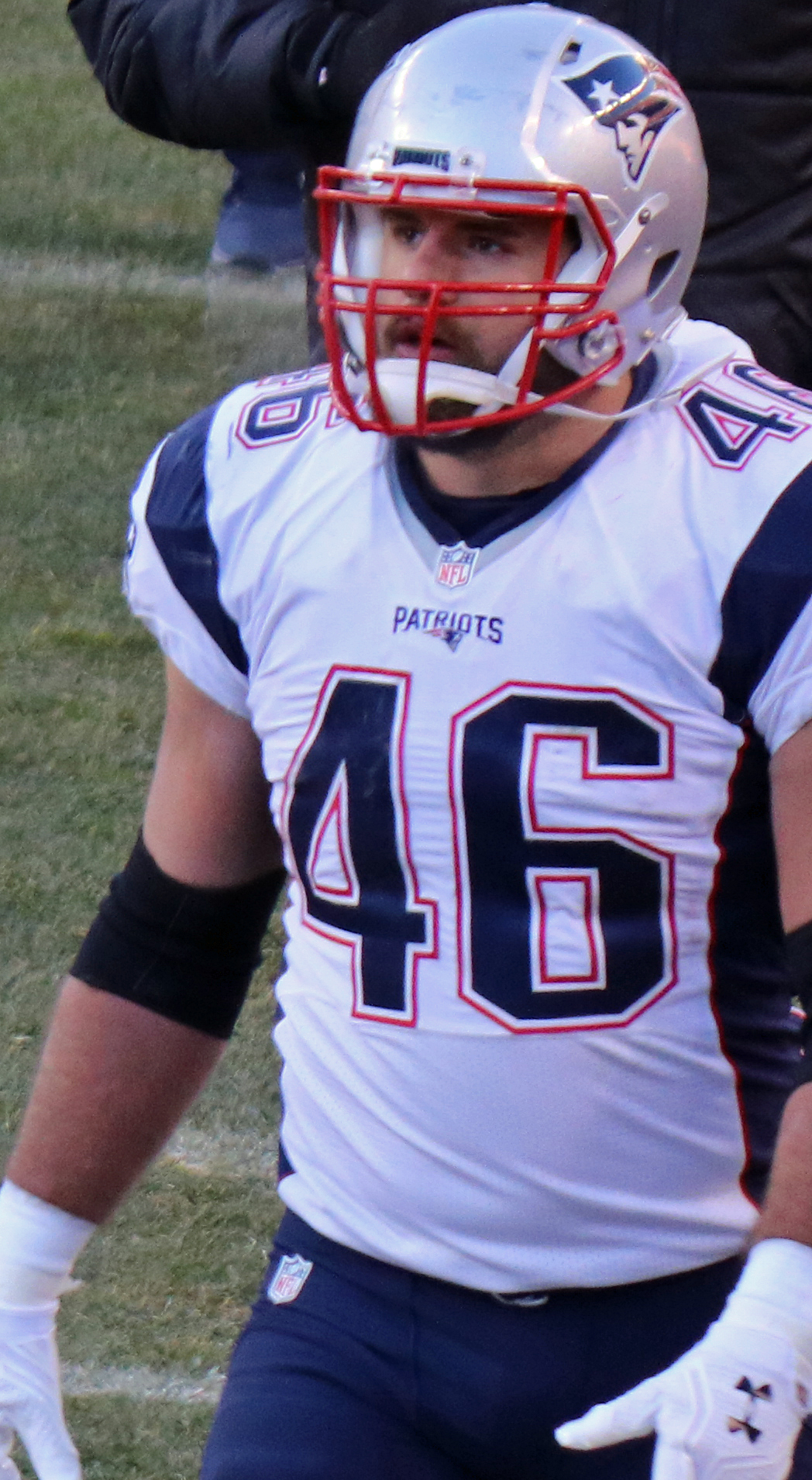
- Develin with the New England Patriots in 2016

No. 35, 46, 40
- Position: Fullback

Personal information
- Born: July 23, 1988 (age 38); Gilbertsville, Pennsylvania, U.S.
- Listed height: 6 ft 3 in (1.91 m)
- Listed weight: 255 lb (116 kg)

Career information
- High school: Boyertown Area (Boyertown, Pennsylvania)
- College: Brown (2006–2009)
- NFL draft: 2010: undrafted

Career history
- Oklahoma City Yard Dawgz (2010); Florida Tuskers (2010); Cincinnati Bengals (2010–2012)*; New England Patriots (2012–2019)
- * Offseason or practice squad member only

Awards and highlights
- 3× Super Bowl champion (XLIX, LI, LIII); Pro Bowl (2017); New England Patriots All-2010s Team; New England Patriots All-Dynasty Team

Career NFL statistics
- Rushing yards: 26
- Rushing average: 1.7
- Rushing touchdowns: 5
- Receptions: 31
- Receiving yards: 222
- Stats at Pro Football Reference

James Rittenhouse Develin, Jr. (born July 23, 1988) is an American former professional football player who was a fullback in the National Football League (NFL). He played college football for the Brown Bears as a defensive end. He was originally signed as an undrafted free agent by the Oklahoma City Yard Dawgz of the Arena Football League (AFL). He most prominently played for the New England Patriots for seven seasons with whom he won three Super Bowls and appeared in a Pro Bowl. Develin was on the Cincinnati Bengals practice squad for two seasons and played for the Florida Tuskers of the United Football League (UFL).

== Early life ==
Develin attended Boyertown Area Senior High School where he lettered in both football and lacrosse. While there, he was named a football team captain, team Most Valuable Player (MVP), First-team All-Area, First-team All-Pac and All-Berks County. He was chosen to play in the Berks County All-star game as well as the NationalAllStars.com Bowl. He was named a National Football Foundation and College Hall of Fame Scholar-Athlete. He was awarded the Warren O. Fry Memorial Award as well as the Tall Cedars Football Scholar-Athlete Award.

== College career ==
Develin attended Brown University, where he majored in engineering and played on the defensive line for the Bears.

As a freshman in 2006, he appeared in eight games. He recorded 12 tackles (six solo) and one sack. In 2007, as a sophomore, he recorded 50 tackles (28 solo), 13.5 tackles-for-loss, six sacks, three quarterback hurries, and three fumble recoveries. For the season, he was named Second-team All-Ivy. As a junior, in 2008, he recorded 34 tackles, 9.5 tackles-for-loss, and three sacks. He was named Second-team All-Ivy. As a senior in 2009, he recorded 53 tackles, 16 tackles-for-loss, five sacks, one interception, and two fumble recoveries.

== Professional career ==
=== Pre-draft ===
Pre-draft measurables
Height	Weight	40-yard dash	10-yard split	20-yard split	20-yard shuttle	Three-cone drill	Vertical jump	Broad jump	Bench press
6 ft 3 in (1.91 m)	259 lb (117 kg)	5.03 s	1.75 s	2.88 s	4.55 s	7.25 s	28 1/2 in (0.72 m)	8 ft 8 in (2.64 m)	39 reps
All values from Brown's Pro Day

Develin went undrafted in the 2010 NFL draft, as expected. He attended a tryout with the Cleveland Browns, but did not receive a contract offer.

=== Oklahoma City Yard Dawgz ===
Develin originally signed with the Oklahoma City Yard Dawgz of the Arena Football League (AFL) and appeared in one game.

=== Florida Tuskers ===
He then joined the Florida Tuskers of the United Football League (UFL), where he converted from defensive line to fullback. Develin played under Tuskers' head coach Jay Gruden.

=== Cincinnati Bengals ===
On November 30, 2010, the Cincinnati Bengals signed Develin to their practice squad.

On February 3, 2011, Develin was reunited with his former head coach with the Tuskers after Jay Gruden was hired to be the Bengals' new offensive coordinator. Throughout training camp, Develin competed for a roster spot as a fullback against Cedric Peerman and Fui Vakapuna. On September 3, 2011, the Bengals waived Develin, but signed him to their practice squad the next day after he cleared waivers. Develin spent the entire 2011 season on the Bengals' practice squad. On August 31, 2012, the Bengals waived Develin as part of their final roster cuts.

=== New England Patriots ===
==== 2012 season ====
On September 2, 2012, Develin was signed to the New England Patriots' practice squad. He was promoted to the active roster on November 28, 2012. On December 16, 2012, Develin made his professional regular season debut during the Patriots' 41–34 loss to the San Francisco 49ers in Week 15. Develin was limited to one game as a rookie in 2012.

==== 2013 season ====
Throughout training camp, Develin competed against Ben Bartholomew for a roster spot as a fullback and special teams player. On September 2, 2013, the Patriots released Develin as part of their final roster cuts. On September 6, 2013, he was re-signed after tight end Matthew Mulligan was released. Head coach Bill Belichick named Develin the starting fullback to begin the regular season. He made his first career start in the Patriots' season-opening 23–21 win at the Buffalo Bills. On December 1, 2013, Develin had two carries for four-yards and scored his first NFL touchdown during a 34–31 win at the Houston Texans.

Develin appeared in all 16 games, starting six. He recorded four carries for 10 yards and a touchdown, and four receptions for 62 yards.

==== 2014 season ====
In 2014, Develin appeared in all 16 games, starting four. He recorded three carries for five yards and six receptions for 43 yards. He also recorded a receiving touchdown in the Patriots' 45–7 drubbing of the Indianapolis Colts in the AFC championship game. The Patriots won Super Bowl XLIX by a score of 28–24 against the Seattle Seahawks. Develin recorded 1 catch for 6 yards in the Super Bowl.

==== 2015 season ====
On September 1, 2015, Develin was placed on season-ending injured reserve after breaking his right tibia in a preseason game against the Carolina Panthers.

==== 2016 season ====
Develin re-signed with the Patriots to a one-year contract on March 7, 2016. On February 5, 2017, Develin was part of the Patriots team that won Super Bowl LI. In the game, he appeared on ten plays on offense and ten on special teams as the Patriots defeated the Atlanta Falcons by a score of 34–28 in overtime.

==== 2017 season ====
On March 6, 2017, Develin signed a two-year contract extension with the Patriots. The deal included a $300,000 signing bonus, $200,000 in guaranteed salary, and a maximum value of $2.85 million.

On December 19, 2017, Develin was selected to the Pro Bowl as a starting fullback. Develin could not play in the Pro Bowl because of his team advancing to Super Bowl LII. The Patriots lost in the Super Bowl to the Philadelphia Eagles by a score of 41–33 without Develin recording any statistics.

==== 2018 season ====
On June 14, 2018, Develin signed a two-year, $3.8 million contract extension with the Patriots through the 2020 season. He played the second-most snaps of any fullback after the San Francisco 49ers' Kyle Juszczyk. He had career highs in touchdowns, with four rushing touchdowns in a three-game span, and receptions, with 12.

Develin helped the Patriots reach Super Bowl LIII where they defeated the Los Angeles Rams 13–3. Prior to the game, former running back and NFL analyst Maurice Jones-Drew called Develin the most important running back in the game, noting that he provided key blocks in all four of the Patriots' rushing touchdowns in the AFC Championship game against the Kansas City Chiefs.

==== 2019 season ====
On September 23, 2019, Develin was placed on injured reserve due to a neck injury he sustained in Week 2 against the Miami Dolphins.

=== Retirement ===
On April 27, 2020, Develin announced his retirement from the NFL, citing health concerns over his neck injury.

== Career statistics ==
=== NFL ===
Legend
	Won the Super Bowl
**Bold**	Career high

==== Regular season ====
Year	Team	Games		Rushing					Receiving					Fumbles	
Year	Team	GP	GS	Att	Yds	Avg	Lng	TD	Rec	Yds	Avg	TD	Lng	Fum	Lost
2012	NE	1	0	0	0	0	0	0	0	0	0	0	0	0	0
2013	NE	**16**	6	4	**10**	**2.5**	4	1	4	**62**	**15.5**	0	**31**	1	0
2014	NE	**16**	4	3	5	1.7	**5**	0	6	43	7.2	0	13	1	0
2015	NE	0	0	Did not play due to injury											
2016	NE	**16**	4	0	0	0	0	0	3	18	6.0	0	13	0	0
2017	NE	**16**	7	0	0	0	0	0	6	38	6.3	0	0	0	0
2018	NE	**16**	**8**	**6**	8	1.3	2	**4**	**12**	61	5.1	0	11	0	0
2019	NE	2	2	2	3	1.5	2	0	0	0	0.0	0	0	0	0
Career		83	31	15	26	1.7	5	5	31	222	7.2	0	31	2	0

==== Postseason ====
Year	Team	Games		Rushing					Receiving					Fumbles	
Year	Team	GP	GS	Att	Yds	Avg	Lng	TD	Rec	Yds	Avg	Lng	TD	Fum	Lost
2013	NE	2	2	1	0	0	0	0	0	0	0		0		0
2014	NE	3	0	0	0	0	0	0	2	7	3.5	6	1	0	0
2015	NE	0	0	DNP											
2016	NE	3	2	0	0	0	0	0	2	13	4.3	13	0	0	0
2017	NE	3	0	0	0	0	0	0	0	0	0	0	0	0	0
2018	NE	3	2	2	5	2.5	3	0	1	9	9	9	0	0	0
Career		14	6	3	5	1.7	3	0	5	29	5.8	13	1	0	0

=== College ===
Season	Team	Games		Defense							
Season	Team	GP	GS	Cmb	Solo	Ass	Sck	TfL	Int	FF	FR
2006	Brown	8	—	12	6	6	1.0	—	0	0	0
2007	Brown	—	—	50	28	22	**6.0**	13.5	0	0	**3**
2008	Brown	—	—	34	—	—	3.0	9.5	0	0	0
2009	Brown	—	—	**53**	—	—	5.0	**16**	**1**	0	2
Career		—	—	149	—	—	15.0	39	1	0	5

== Personal life ==
He is the son of Jim (James Sr.) and Donna Develin. He and his wife, Jennifer, have three sons, James III, William Robert, and Joseph Rudolph, and a daughter, Adrienne Mattea.

Since retirement Develin has taken up distance running, completing the 2021 Boston Marathon, and has also completed Navy Seal Swim events.
