= A.J. Howard =

American football coach and former player (born 1995)

USC Trojans
- Title: Outside linebackers coach

Personal information
- Born: December 23, 1995 (age 30); Hamilton, Georgia, U.S.
- Listed height: 5 ft 11 in (1.80 m)
- Listed weight: 203 lb (92 kg)

Career information
- Position: Defensive back (No. 39)
- High school: Harris County (Hamilton)
- College: Appalachian State (2014–2017)
- NFL draft: 2018: undrafted

Career history

Playing
- Arizona Cardinals (2018)*; New York Giants (2018)*; New England Patriots (2018–2019)*; Baltimore Ravens (2019)*; Philadelphia Eagles (2019)*; Cleveland Browns (2019)*; Detroit Lions (2019)*
- * Offseason or practice squad member only

Coaching
- Louisville (2020) Graduate assistant; Appalachian State (2023–2024) Outside linebackers coach; USC (2025) Assistant linebackers coach; USC (2026–present) Outside linebackers coach

Operations
- New England Patriots (2021–2022) Area scout

Awards and highlights
- Super Bowl champion (LIII); Third-team All-Sun Belt (2017)
- Stats at Pro Football Reference

Alvin "A.J." Donell Howard (born December 23, 1995) is an American professional football coach and former player who is the outside linebackers coach for the USC Trojans. He had stints in the National Football League (NFL) for the seven teams at defensive back. He played college football for the Appalachian State Mountaineers.

== Early life ==
Howard was born on December 23, 1995, in Hamilton, Georgia. He attended Harris County High School in Hamilton.

== College career ==
Howard played for the Appalachian State Mountaineers from 2014 to 2017. In four seasons, he played in 51 games at strong safety, recording 219 tackles, including 12 for loss, 0.5 sack, four interceptions, with returned for a touchdown, 14 pass break ups and two forced fumbles. As a senior, he earned third-team All-Sun Belt honors.

== Professional career ==
Pre-draft measurables
Height	Weight	Arm length	Hand span	Wingspan	40-yard dash	10-yard split	20-yard split	20-yard shuttle	Three-cone drill	Vertical jump	Broad jump	Bench press
5 ft 10 in (1.78 m)	203 lb (92 kg)	30 1/8 in (0.77 m)	9 1/8 in (0.23 m)	5 ft 11 5/8 in (1.82 m)	4.51 s	1.57 s	2.58 s	4.18 s	7.06 s	32 1/2 in (0.83 m)	9 ft 7 in (2.92 m)	24 reps
All values from Pro day

=== Arizona Cardinals ===
After going undrafted in the 2018 NFL draft, Howard signed with the Arizona Cardinals as an undrafted free agent. On September 2, 2018 he was waived by the team.

=== New York Giants ===
On October 25, 2018, the New York Giants signed Howard to the practice squad. He was released on January 2, 2019.

=== New England Patriots ===
On January 8, 2019, Howard was signed by the New England Patriots. He remained on the practice squad for the rest of the season as the team won Super Bowl LIII. Howard signed a reserve/future contract with the Patriots on February 5, 2019. On August 30, he was released by the team.

=== Baltimore Ravens ===
On October 8, 2019, Howard was signed by the Baltimore Ravens. He was released on October 15.

=== Philadelphia Eagles ===
On November 12, 2019, the Philadelphia Eagles signed Howard to the practice squad but he was released the following day.

=== Cleveland Browns ===
On November 21, 2019, Howard signed with the Cleveland Browns. On December 3, he was released by the team.

=== Detroit Lions ===
On December 24, 2019, Howard was signed by the Detroit Lions. He signed a reserve/future contract on December 31. On March 17, 2020, Howard was released by the Lions.

== Coaching career ==
Howard began his coaching career for the Louisville Cardinals in 2020 as a graduate assistant. In 2023, he returned to his alma mater, Appalachian State and served as the outside linebackers coach for two years. In 2025, Howard became the assistant linebackers coach for the USC Trojans. The following year, he was promoted to the be outside linebackers coach.

== Operations career ==
In 2021, Howard joined the New England Patriots as an area scout. He spent two seasons in that position before leaving in 2023.
