= Frank Herron =

American football player (born 1994)

No. 92
- Position: Defensive tackle

Personal information
- Born: July 9, 1994 (age 32); Centreville, Illinois, U.S.
- Listed height: 6 ft 5 in (1.96 m)
- Listed weight: 276 lb (125 kg)

Career information
- High school: Central (Memphis, Tennessee)
- College: LSU
- NFL draft: 2018: undrafted

Career history
- New England Patriots (2018)*; Seattle Seahawks (2018)*; New England Patriots (2018–2019)*; Tennessee Titans (2019)*; Detroit Lions (2019)*; Miami Dolphins (2019)*; Detroit Lions (2019–2020); Carolina Panthers (2021–2022); Memphis Showboats (2023)
- * Offseason or practice squad member only

Awards and highlights
- Super Bowl champion (LIII)

Career NFL statistics
- Total tackles: 12
- Stats at Pro Football Reference

Frank Herron (born July 9, 1994) is an American former professional football player who was a defensive tackle in the National Football League (NFL). He played college football for the LSU Tigers. He was a member of the New England Patriots, Seattle Seahawks, Tennessee Titans, Detroit Lions, Miami Dolphins, Carolina Panthers, and Memphis Showboats.

== Professional career ==
=== New England Patriots (first stint) ===
Herron signed with the New England Patriots as an undrafted free agent on May 11, 2018. He was waived on August 31.

=== Seattle Seahawks ===
On September 3, 2018, Herron was signed to the Seattle Seahawks' practice squad. He was released on September 12.

=== New England Patriots (second stint) ===
On October 8, 2018, Herron was signed to the Patriots' practice squad. Herron won Super Bowl LIII when the Patriots defeated the Los Angeles Rams 13–3. He signed a reserve/future contract with the Patriots on February 5, 2019. He was released on May 16.

=== Tennessee Titans ===
Herron signed with the Tennessee Titans on May 29, 2019. He was waived on August 31.

=== Detroit Lions (first stint) ===
On September 27, 2019, Herron was signed to the Detroit Lions' practice squad, but was released the next day.

=== Miami Dolphins ===
On October 24, 2019, Herron was signed to the Miami Dolphins' practice squad.

=== Detroit Lions (second stint) ===
On December 10, 2019, Herron was signed by the Lions off the Dolphins' practice squad.

On September 5, 2020, Herron was waived by the Lions and signed to the practice squad the next day. He was elevated to the active roster on both November 14 and 21 for the team's Week 10 and 11 games against the Washington Football Team and the Carolina Panthers, then reverted to the practice squad after each game. He was signed to the active roster on December 5.

On January 2, 2021, Herron was waived by the Lions.

=== Carolina Panthers ===
Herron signed with the Carolina Panthers on April 13, 2021. On May 10, Herron was released by the Panthers. He re-signed with Carolina on May 26. He was waived on August 31 and re-signed to the practice squad the next day. On October 30, Herron was suspended 2 games without pay for violating the NFL's policy on performance-enhancing substances. He signed a reserve/future contract with the Panthers on January 10, 2022.

On August 30, Herron was waived by the Panthers and re-signed to the practice squad on September 21. He was released on October 20.

=== Memphis Showboats ===
Herron signed with the Memphis Showboats of the USFL on May 1, 2023. He was not part of the roster after the 2024 UFL dispersal draft on January 15, 2024.
