= Chris Lacy =

American football player (born 1996)

Profile
- Position: Wide receiver

Personal information
- Born: January 28, 1996 (age 30); Desoto, Texas, U.S.
- Listed height: 6 ft 3 in (1.91 m)
- Listed weight: 205 lb (93 kg)

Career information
- High school: DeSoto
- College: Oklahoma State
- NFL draft: 2018: undrafted

Career history
- New England Patriots (2018)*; Detroit Lions (2018–2019); Dallas Cowboys (2020)*; Chicago Bears (2021)*; Las Vegas Raiders (2022–2023)*; Birmingham Stallions (2024)*
- * Offseason or practice squad member only

Career NFL statistics
- Receptions: 3
- Receiving yards: 60
- Stats at Pro Football Reference

Chris Lacy (born January 28, 1996) is an American former professional football player who was a wide receiver for the Detroit Lions of the National Football League (NFL). He played college football for the Oklahoma State Cowboys, and was signed by the New England Patriots as an undrafted free agent after the 2018 NFL draft.

== College career ==
Lacy played football at Oklahoma State. He hauled in 63 passes for 920 yards and five touchdowns. Lacy received his degree in Industrial Engineering and Management.

== Professional career ==
=== New England Patriots ===
Lacy signed with the New England Patriots as an undrafted free agent on May 11, 2018. He was waived by the Patriots on May 18, 2018.

=== Detroit Lions ===
On May 21, 2018, Lacy was claimed off waivers by the Detroit Lions. He was waived on September 1, 2018 and was signed to the practice squad the next day. He was promoted to the active roster on December 22, 2018.

On September 21, 2019, Lacy was waived by the Lions and re-signed to the practice squad. He was promoted to the active roster on November 27, 2019.

On August 9, 2020, Lacy was waived by the Lions, but re-signed with the team on August 20. He was waived on September 5, 2020.

=== Dallas Cowboys ===
On November 3, 2020, Lacy was signed to the Dallas Cowboys practice squad. He signed a reserve/future contract with the Cowboys on January 4, 2021. He was waived by the Cowboys on March 19, 2021.

=== Chicago Bears ===
On May 16, 2021, Lacy signed with the Chicago Bears. He was waived on August 31, 2021.

=== Las Vegas Raiders ===
On August 10, 2022, Lacy signed with the Las Vegas Raiders. He was waived on August 23, 2022, and re-signed to the practice squad on September 15. He signed a reserve/future contract on January 9, 2023.

On August 27, 2023, Lacy was waived/injured by the Raiders and placed on injured reserve. He was released on September 4.

=== Birmingham Stallions ===
On February 5, 2024, Lacy signed with the Birmingham Stallions of the United Football League (UFL). He was released on March 10, 2024.
