= Marquis Flowers =

American football player (born 1992)

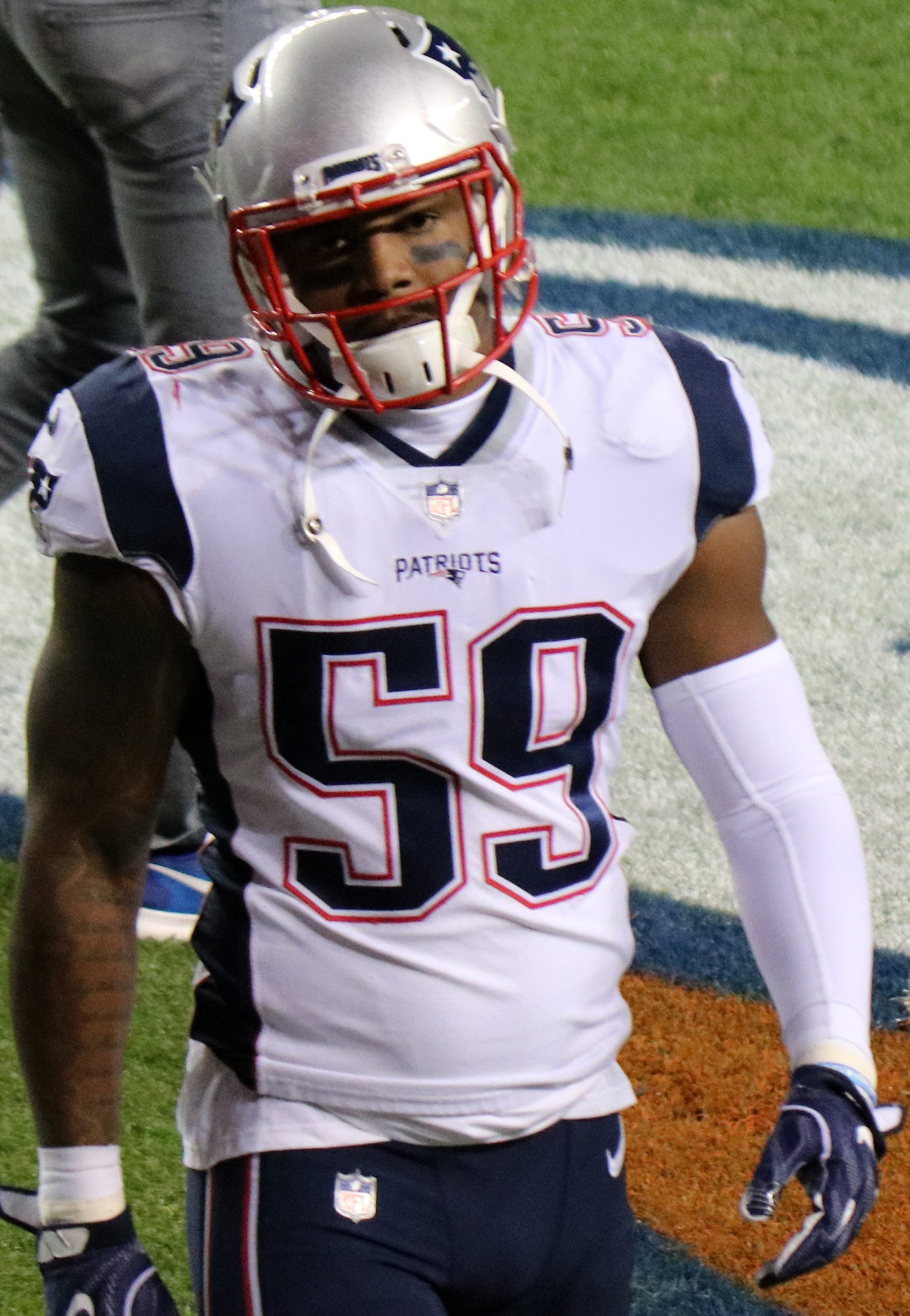
- Flowers with the New England Patriots in 2017

No. 53, 59
- Position: Linebacker

Personal information
- Born: February 16, 1992 (age 34); Independence, Missouri, U.S.
- Listed height: 6 ft 3 in (1.91 m)
- Listed weight: 269 lb (122 kg)

Career information
- High school: Millennium (Goodyear, Arizona)
- College: Arizona
- NFL draft: 2014: 6th round, 212th overall pick

Career history
- Cincinnati Bengals (2014–2016); New England Patriots (2017); Detroit Lions (2018); Washington Redskins (2018)

Career NFL statistics
- Total tackles: 49
- Sacks: 3.5
- Forced fumbles: 1
- Pass deflections: 2
- Stats at Pro Football Reference

Marquis Flowers (born February 16, 1992) is an American former professional football player who was a linebacker in the National Football League (NFL). He played college football for the Arizona Wildcats and was selected by the Cincinnati Bengals in the sixth round of the 2014 NFL draft. He also played for the New England Patriots, Detroit Lions, and Washington Redskins.

== Early life ==
Flowers was born in Independence, Missouri. He attended high school at Millennium High School in Goodyear, Arizona, where he played running back, wide receiver, and free safety. He first played in 2007 as a sophomore, tallying 76 tackles, an interception and a fumble recovery. The following season, he played both on offense and defense, rushing for 932 yards and 8 touchdowns, as well as recording 6 receptions for 106 yards. He had 87 tackles on defense, as well as a sack, three interceptions, and another fumble recovery. He played in the U.S. Army All-American Bowl in January 2010.

Flowers attracted interest from several colleges, notably Notre Dame, USC, UCLA, Arizona State University, and the University of Arizona, where he was recruited by Tim Kish. Flowers signed his letter of intent on January 9, 2010.

== College career ==
Flowers played sparsely during the 2010 season, recording 11 tackles in 13 games, most of which came on special teams.

Flowers moved into the starting free safety position before the 2011 season. He played in all 13 games in the 2011 season, and recorded 68 tackles (fourth most on the team), as well as 3 passes defended and an interception.

Flowers switched to outside linebacker during 2012 training camp. Flowers transitioned well, and maintained relatively the same production that he had during his sophomore season. He finished the 2012 season with 100 tackles, 5.5 sacks, three interceptions, six passes defended, and three forced fumbles, one of which he recovered. Flowers was named the Pac-12 Defensive Player of the Week after Arizona's 39-35 win over USC, where he intercepted two passes and recorded a fumble. In the 2012 New Mexico Bowl against Nevada, a 49-48 Arizona win, Flowers recovered a key onside kick that helped Arizona take a 1-point lead with 19 seconds to go. He then intercepted Nevada quarterback Cody Fajardo on the next play, sealing an Arizona victory. For his performance, he was named the defensive most valuable player. Flowers rounded out his college career in 2013, in which he recorded 94 tackles, 1 sack and 1 interception, which he returned for a touchdown.

== Professional career ==
Pre-draft measurables
Height	Weight	Arm length	Hand span	40-yard dash	10-yard split	20-yard split	20-yard shuttle	Three-cone drill	Vertical jump	Broad jump	Bench press
6 ft 2 5/8 in (1.90 m)	231 lb (105 kg)	32 in (0.81 m)	9 3/8 in (0.24 m)	4.51 s	1.58 s	2.58 s	4.32 s	7.06 s	37.5 in (0.95 m)	9 ft 8 in (2.95 m)	24 reps
All values from Pro Day

=== Cincinnati Bengals ===
Flowers was selected by the Bengals in the sixth round with the 212th overall selection in the 2014 NFL draft. He played in all 16 regular-season games as a rookie totaling eight tackles and one pass defended.

Flowers suffered a shoulder injury in the final preseason game in 2015 and was placed on injured reserve, missing the entire 2015 season. In 2016, Flowers final year with the Bengals, he again played in all 16 regular season games, and recorded eight solo tackles, and one fumble recovery.

=== New England Patriots ===
On August 29, 2017, Flowers was traded to the New England Patriots for a 2018 seventh round pick. Following injuries to Dont'a Hightower and Kyle Van Noy, Flowers saw his defensive snaps increase throughout the season after only being a core special teams player throughout his career. In Week 16, in his second start of the season, Flowers recorded a team-high 10 tackles and 2.5 sacks, in a 37-16 win over the Buffalo Bills. Flowers finished the season with 32 tackles and 3.5 sacks. In the playoffs, New England defeated both the Tennessee Titans and Jacksonville Jaguars to reach Super Bowl LII, but lost 33–41 to the Philadelphia Eagles with Flowers recording 1 tackle in the Super Bowl.

On March 22, 2018, Flowers signed a one-year deal to remain with the Patriots. On September 1, 2018, he was released by the Patriots.

=== Detroit Lions ===
On September 3, 2018, Flowers signed with the Detroit Lions. He was released by the Lions on October 10.

=== Washington Redskins ===
Flowers signed with the Washington Redskins on December 26, 2018. He was waived on August 31, 2019.

Flowers was selected in the open phase of the 2020 XFL draft by the Dallas Renegades of the XFL, but declined to play in the league.
