= Darren Andrews =

American football player (born 1995)

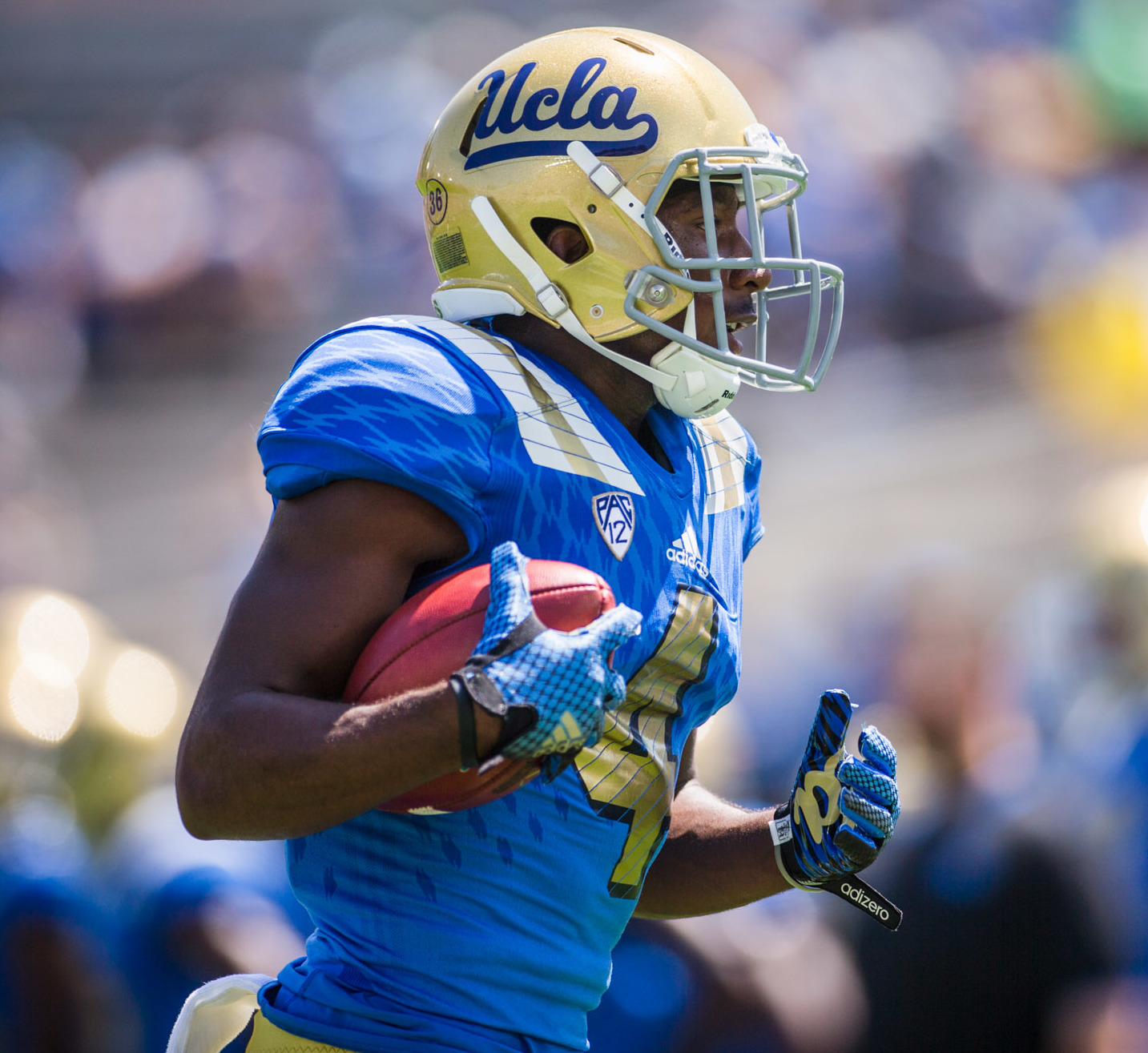

Arizona Wildcats
- Title: Graduate assistant/Wide receivers coach

Personal information
- Born: August 5, 1995 (age 31); Los Angeles, California, U.S.
- Listed height: 5 ft 10 in (1.78 m)
- Listed weight: 180 lb (82 kg)

Career information
- Position: Wide receiver
- High school: Bishop Amat Memorial (La Puente, California)
- College: UCLA
- NFL draft: 2018: undrafted

Career history

Playing
- New England Patriots (2018); Calgary Stampeders (2019)*
- * Offseason or practice squad member only

Coaching
- Arizona (2021–present) Graduate assistant/ wide receivers coach

Awards and highlights
- Super Bowl champion (LIII)
- Stats at Pro Football Reference

Darren Andrews (born August 5, 1995) is an American former football player. He played college football for the UCLA Bruins and signed with the New England Patriots after going undrafted in the 2018 NFL draft.

== Early life ==
Andrews attended Bishop Amat Memorial High School where he was a three star recruit by Scout.com and Rivals.com. He was number 111 wide receiver in the nation and number 20 ranked receiver in the west according to Scout.com. Andrews also ran track in high school. He was named Track Athlete of the Year in San Gabriel Valley.

== College career ==
Andrews hauled in 162 passes for 1,977 yards and 15 touchdowns and rushed seven times for 76 yards and one touchdown in 41 games played with the UCLA Bruins, Andrews also had four kick returns for 81 yards, and five punt returns for 34 yards.

== Professional career ==
=== New England Patriots ===
Andrews signed with the New England Patriots as an undrafted free agent on May 11, 2018. He was waived and put on reserve/non-football injury list on May 14, 2018 after clearing waivers. Andrews won Super Bowl LIII when the Patriots defeated the Los Angeles Rams 13-3. He was released on March 4, 2019.

=== Calgary Stampeders ===
On September 30, 2019, Andrews was added to the Calgary Stampeders practice roster. He was released on October 26, 2019.
