= American Friends of Isaac Accords =

Nonprofit organization

- Abbreviation: AFOIA
- Named after: Isaac Accords
- Formation: August 11, 2025; 14 months ago
- Type: Nonprofit
- Legal status: 501(c)(3) organization
- Headquarters: New York City, United States
- Official language: English, Spanish, Portuguese, Hebrew, etc.
- Leader: S. Fitzgerald Haney
- Endowment: $1 million (2025)
- Website: www.isaacaccords.org

American Friends of Isaac Accords (AFOIA) is a nonprofit organization established in 2025 and headquartered in New York City. The organization aims to promote cooperation between Israel and countries in Latin America and the Caribbean, serving as the philanthropic and operational vehicle for the Isaac Accords initiative conceived by Argentine President Javier Milei and Argentina's Ambassador to Israel Shimon Axel Wahnish.

AFOIA received initial funding in the amount of $1 million from the Genesis Prize Foundation, which administers an annual $1 million award presented to individuals with notable professional achievements or contributions to Jewish society.

== Founding ==
In January 2025, Argentine President Javier Milei was named the 2025 Genesis Prize Laureate, becoming the first non-Jewish recipient and the first sitting head of state to receive the prize.

In keeping with Genesis Prize tradition, Milei declined the prize money and directed it to a new initiative to support his vision for deepened Israel–Latin America relations. It was to be known as the Isaac Accords and modeled on the Abraham Accords. The Isaac Accords were formally announced on April 19, 2026 in Jerusalem, during President Milei's third state visit to Israel, at a ceremony attended by Prime Minister Benjamin Netanyahu, foreign ministers of Argentina and Israel, and senior U.S. officials.

American Friends of Isaac Accords was incorporated on August 11, 2025. It aims to develop closer ties between governments across Latin America, the United States, and Israel with key stakeholders to counter Israel's growing international isolation and build alliances in the Western Hemisphere. Former United States Ambassador to Costa Rica S. Fitzgerald Haney serves as the operational head of AFOIA.

AFOIA offers grants to established nonprofit organizations in Latin America, Israel, and the United States. AFOIA made initial grants to seven partner organizations, which include ILAN, StandWithUs, Israel Allies Foundation, Rambam Health Care Campus, Passages Israel (formerly The Philos Project), Yalla Israel (Maccabee Task Force) and Fuente Latina. It has also supported projects in Cuba and the United States.

== Regional expansion ==
AFOIA initially announced that its programming will focus on three priority countries, Panama, Costa Rica, and Uruguay, as these countries have existing bilateral relationships with Israel, are open to deeper cooperation, and have functional civil society ecosystems. Subsequently, AFOIA announced its plans to expand its programming to Guatemala, Ecuador, Honduras, and Brazil.

== Accomplishments ==
Ecuador opened an Office of Innovation with diplomatic standing in Jerusalem, while Costa Rica announced plans to do the same. Costa Rica also signed a free trade agreement with Israel and adopted the International Holocaust Remembrance Alliance definition of antisemitism. Bolivia restored full diplomatic relations with Israel, and the newly elected leaders of Honduras and Chile announced plans to forge closer ties with Israel. In April 2026, the Brazil–Israel Parliamentary Caucus became the first legislative group in Latin America to sign the Declaration of Shared Principles, aimed at strengthening bilateral ties in economic development, innovation, security, and healthcare. In June 2026, Colombian President-elect Abelardo de la Espriella announced that Colombia would fully restore relations with Israel and move Colombia's embassy in Israel to Jerusalem.

== Criticism ==
The Isaac Accords and AFOIA have drawn criticism from governments that have adopted hostile positions toward Israel, such as Colombia. Colombian President Gustavo Petro condemned the regional pro-Israel realignment as contrary to international law. However, in June 2026, following elections in Colombia, Colombian President-elect Abelardo de la Espriella announced that Colombia would fully restore relations with Israel and move Colombia's embassy in Israel to Jerusalem.

== See also ==
- Argentina–Israel relations
- Foreign relations of Israel
- Isaac Accords
- IHRA Working Definition of Antisemitism
