= Argentina–Israel relations =

Bilateral relations

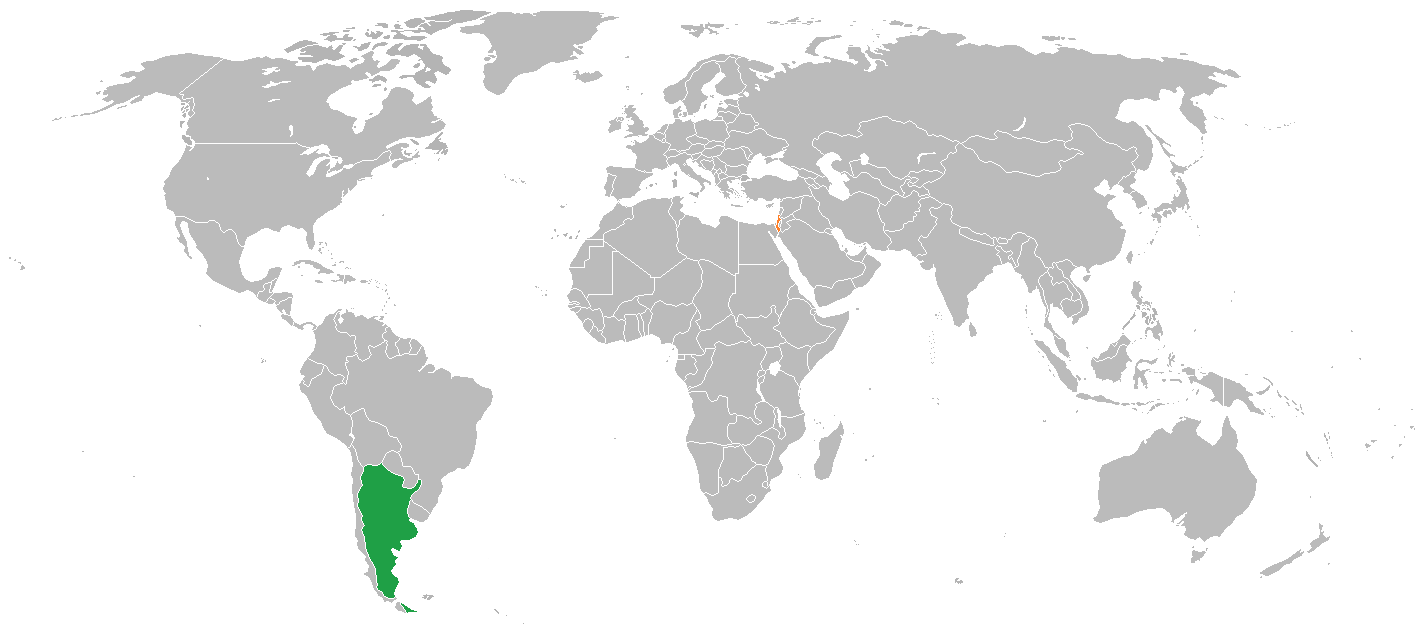
- Argentina: Israel

Diplomatic mission
- Argentine Embassy, Tel Aviv: Israeli Embassy, Buenos Aires

Envoy
- Ambassador Axel Wahnish: Ambassador Eyal Sela

Argentina–Israel relations are the historical and bilateral relations between the Argentine Republic and the State of Israel began shortly after the Israeli Declaration of Independence in 1948, with the countries establishing diplomatic relations on 31 May 1949. Both are members of the World Trade Organization and the United Nations.

== History ==
=== 20th century ===
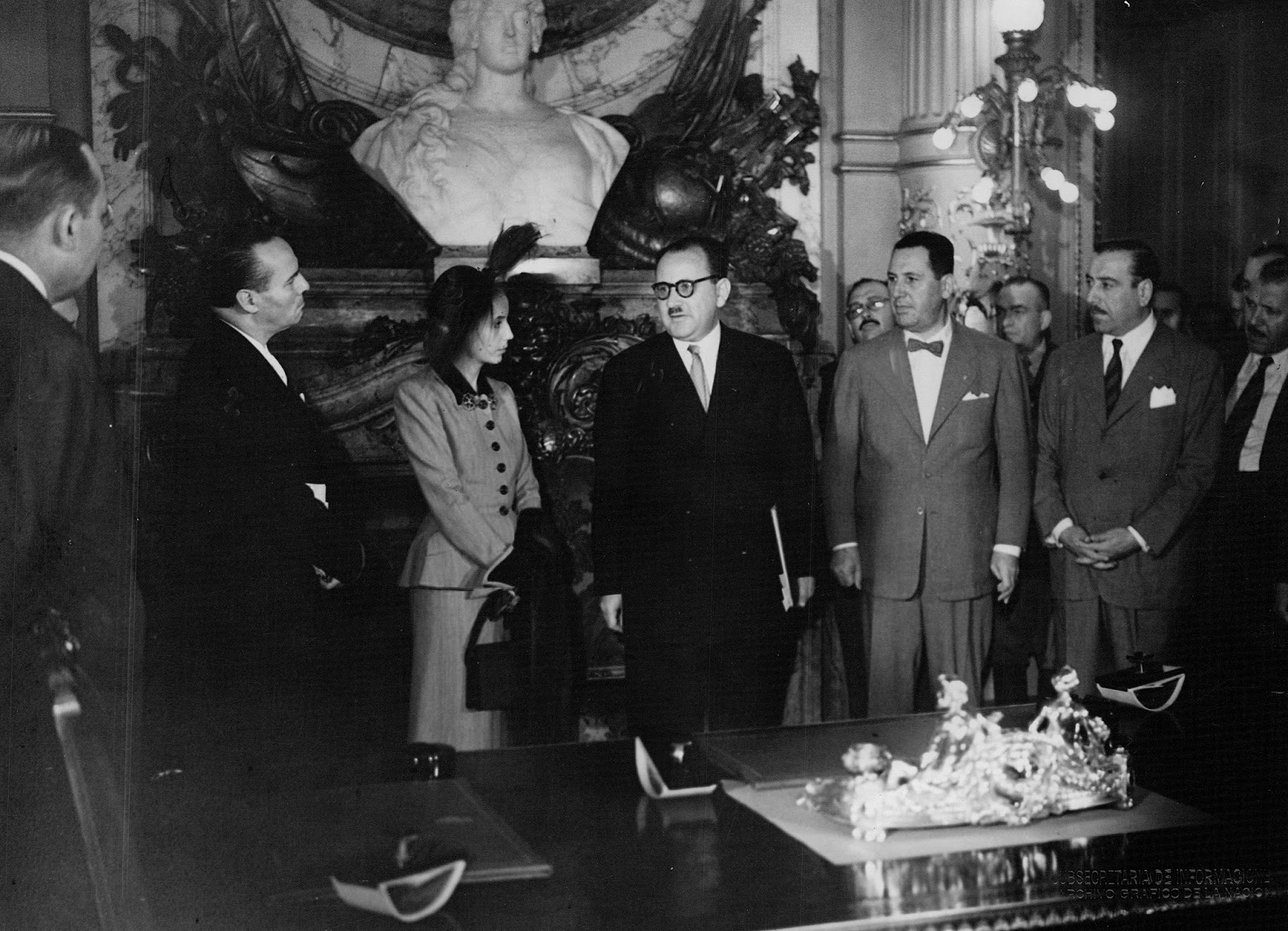
Jacob Tsur, the first Ambassador of Israel to Argentina, speaking at the Casa Rosada during a ceremony for the signing of an agreement between Argentina and Israel, 1950. He is joined by Juan and Eva Perón, Oscar Ivanissevich, and Héctor J. Cámpora, among others.

Argentina has a long history of the Jewish population dated back to the 16th century. On 29 November 1947, Argentina was among the 10 countries that abstained from voting in the United Nations Partition Plan for Palestine. Argentina established diplomatic relations with Israel on 31 May 1949, a year after its independence.

Relations between the two were tested during the early years of Nazi hunting when Israel's Mossad kidnapped former Nazi Adolf Eichmann despite Argentine protestations of a violation of its sovereignty. Immediately after World War II, Argentina was a safe haven for former Nazi officials because they brought badly needed capital investment and/or technical expertise.

According to declassified British Foreign and Commonwealth Office documents, Israel sold arms to Argentina before, during, and in the immediate aftermath of the Falklands War in 1982. The arms sales to Argentina included Douglas A-4 Skyhawk jets, which would later be used in the war with the United Kingdom.

Carlos Menem was the first head of state of Argentina to make a diplomatic visit to Israel, in 1991. He proposed to mediate between Israel and Syria in their negotiations over the Golan Heights. However, the relations were further tested when Hezbollah was blamed for bombing the Israeli embassy and a Jewish community centre in 1992 and 1994, respectively. Since 2013, roughly 100 Jewish organisations across Argentina have called for the government to repeal its pact with the Islamic Republic of Iran over the AMIA terrorist attacks.

=== 21st century ===
While Argentina has the largest Jewish population in Latin America, there have been various cases of antisemitism in Argentina, such as the desecration of 58 Jewish graves in La Tablada by unknown peoples in 2009, mostly due to negative stereotypes of Jews controlling business interests and dominating the world through capitalism, as well as Israel's affiliation with the United States.

In 2010, Argentina announced the intention to join Brazil in recognising an independent Palestinian state, provoking sharp criticism from Israel. On 6 December 2010, Argentina subsequently recognised the State of Palestine on the borders of 4 June 1967 (i.e., the West Bank, Gaza and East Jerusalem), which constituted Arab territory prior to the Six-Day War. In 2012, Argentine President Cristina Fernández de Kirchner met an Israeli-Palestinian delegation and announced that Argentina would spearhead the Latin American role in reinvigorating the peace process in the Israeli–Palestinian conflict.

In September 2017, Israeli Prime Minister Benjamin Netanyahu paid an official visit to Argentina, becoming the first Israeli Prime Minister in office to visit Argentina and Latin America.

In March 2019, two Iranian citizens used fake Israeli passports to leave Spain and different fake Israeli passports to enter Argentina. Realising that the passports were fraudulent, Argentinian police arrested the suspects. Argentinian prosecutors discovered that the suspects had previously used fake passports to enter other countries, including Portugal.

In January 2020, President Alberto Fernández travelled to Israel for his first presidential trip abroad. There he paid respects to the victims of the Holocaust and maintained a bilateral meeting with Prime Minister Benjamin Netanyahu who thanked him for keeping Hezbollah branded as a terrorist organisation, a measure taken by Fernández's predecessor Mauricio Macri.

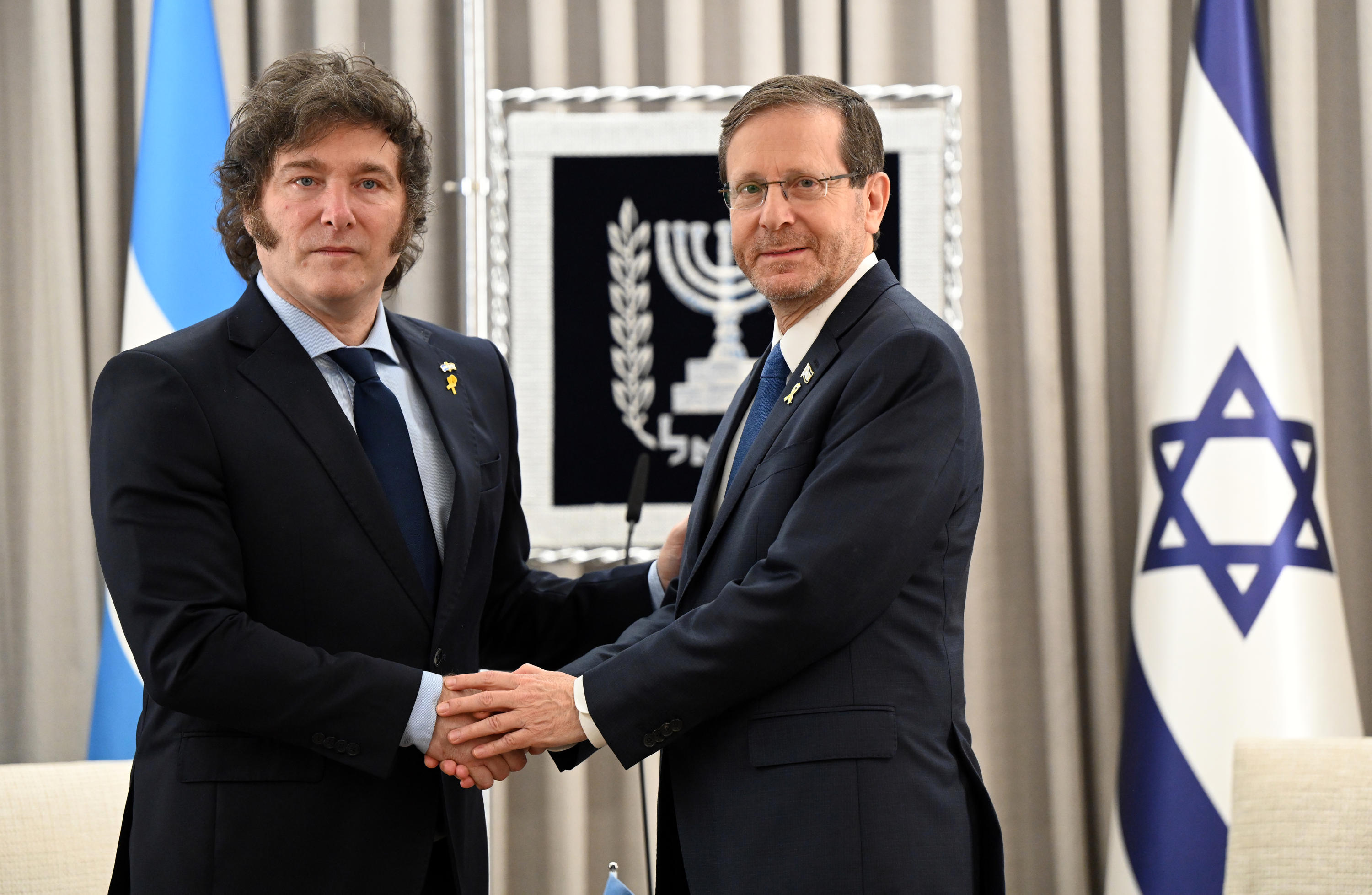
President Javier Milei and Israeli President Isaac Herzog shake hands in Beit HaNassi in Jerusalem on 6 February 2024

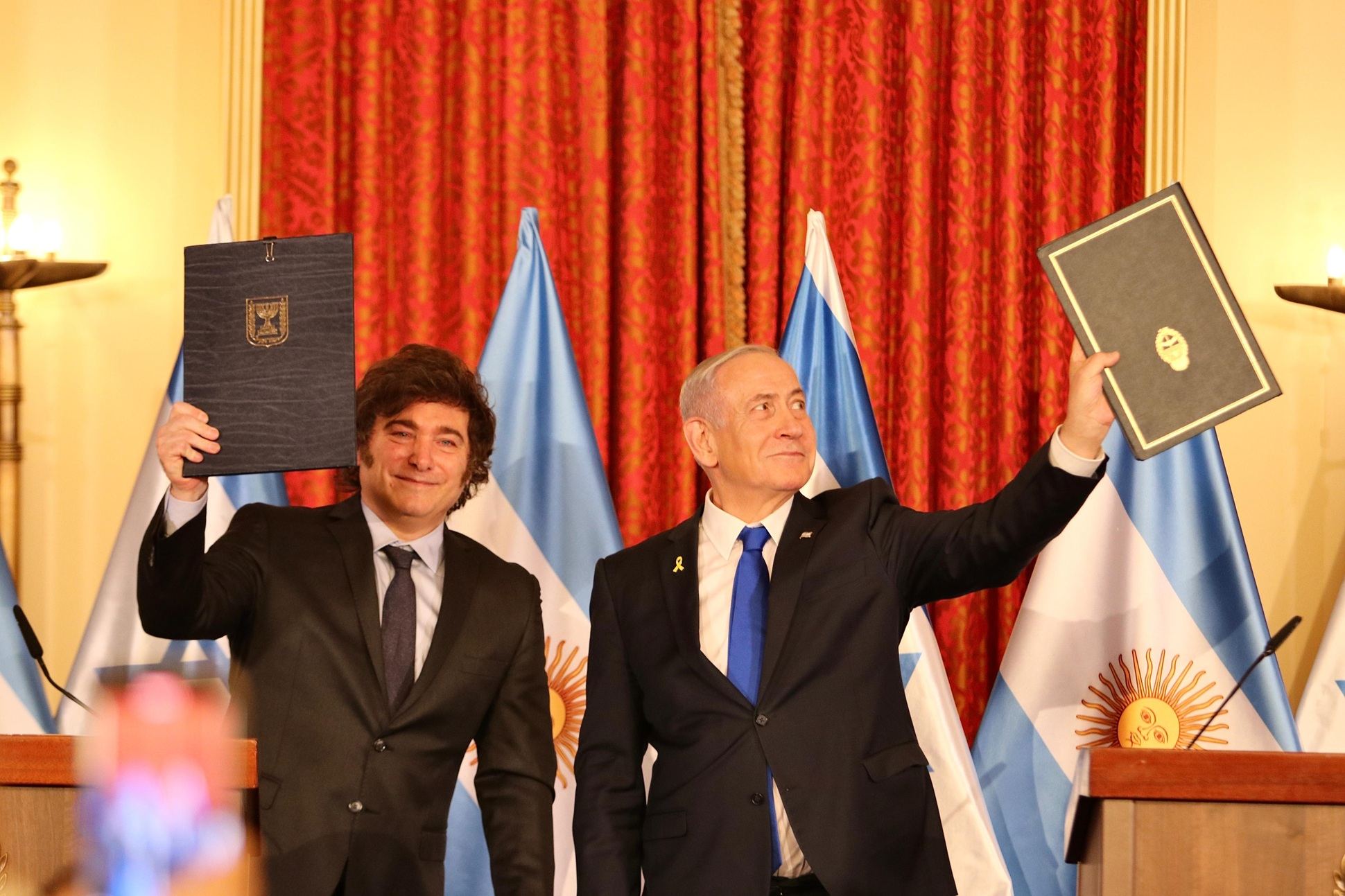
Milei and Israeli Prime Minister Benjamin Netanyahu in June 2025

In the aftermath of the 2023 Argentine general election and Javier Milei's victory, President-elect Milei pledged to move the Argentine Embassy from Tel Aviv to Jerusalem, and announced as part of "a spiritual trip" alongside rabbis he studies with, Milei would visit the Western Wall and Israel before his inauguration on 10 December 2023. In December 2023, President Javier Milei announced that his government is working on designating Hamas as a terrorist organization.

In February 2024, Argentinian President Javier Milei visited Israel, making Israel his first bilateral overseas destination as president. In May 2024, President Javier Milei's government broke with Argentina's previous position on Palestine, voting against recognition of Palestinian statehood at United Nations. The vote was in line with the country's pro-Israel shift in its foreign policy.

In June 2025, Milei reaffirmed his pledge to move the embassy to Jerusalem, aiming for the spring of 2026, and El Al announced plans to launch direct passenger flights between the two countries.

Argentina has supported Israel and the United States in the 2026 Iran war, with Milei saying that he is "proud to be the most Zionist president in the world." During his third state visit to Israel, Milei and Netanyahu announced direct flights between the two countries via El Al and the advance on the embassy issues. The flights connecting Ben Gurion Airport (TLV) in Israel to Ezeiza Airport (EZE) will connect Jerusalem and Buenos Aires and will become the airline's longest scheduled route. The new service is planned to start in late November 2026 and will be operated twice weekly with Boeing 787-9 aircraft configured to accommodate 271 passengers, with a flight time of 16 1/2 hours to Buenos Aires and 15 hours to Tel Aviv.

In September 2026, Argentinian President Javier Milei met Israeli Prime Minister Benjamin Netanyahu at the United Nations General Assembly in New York.

==== Isaac Accords ====
In August 2025, the Isaac Accords, which are modeled on the 2020 Abraham Accords, were officially announced. The Isaac Accords are a diplomatic initiative inspired by Argentine President Javier Milei's receipt of the Genesis Prize that aims to strengthen political, economic, and cultural cooperation between Israel and various Latin American countries, starting with Uruguay, Panama, and Costa Rica. The nonprofit organization American Friends of Isaac Accords (AFOIA) was also launched in the same month. The organization was established with an initial US$1 million from the Genesis Prize Foundation, in honor of Milei's acceptance of the Genesis Prize in Jerusalem on June 12, 2025.

==== Sea Lion Field ====
The involvement of the Israeli company Navitas Petroleum in the development of the Sea Lion Field near the Falkland Islands was reported to have caused tension between the two countries amidst a heated renewal of the Falkland Islands sovereignty dispute. Argentina's foreign ministry called the company's plans to develop the offshore oil field "unilateral and illegitimate." In September 2026, Javier Milei threatened to sanction oil firms working off the Falkland Islands and said his government would file criminal charges against Navitas Petroleum, which has a 65 percent stake in the oil field. The same month, a judge in Argentina ordered British and Israeli companies to halt oilfield development.

== Resident diplomatic missions ==
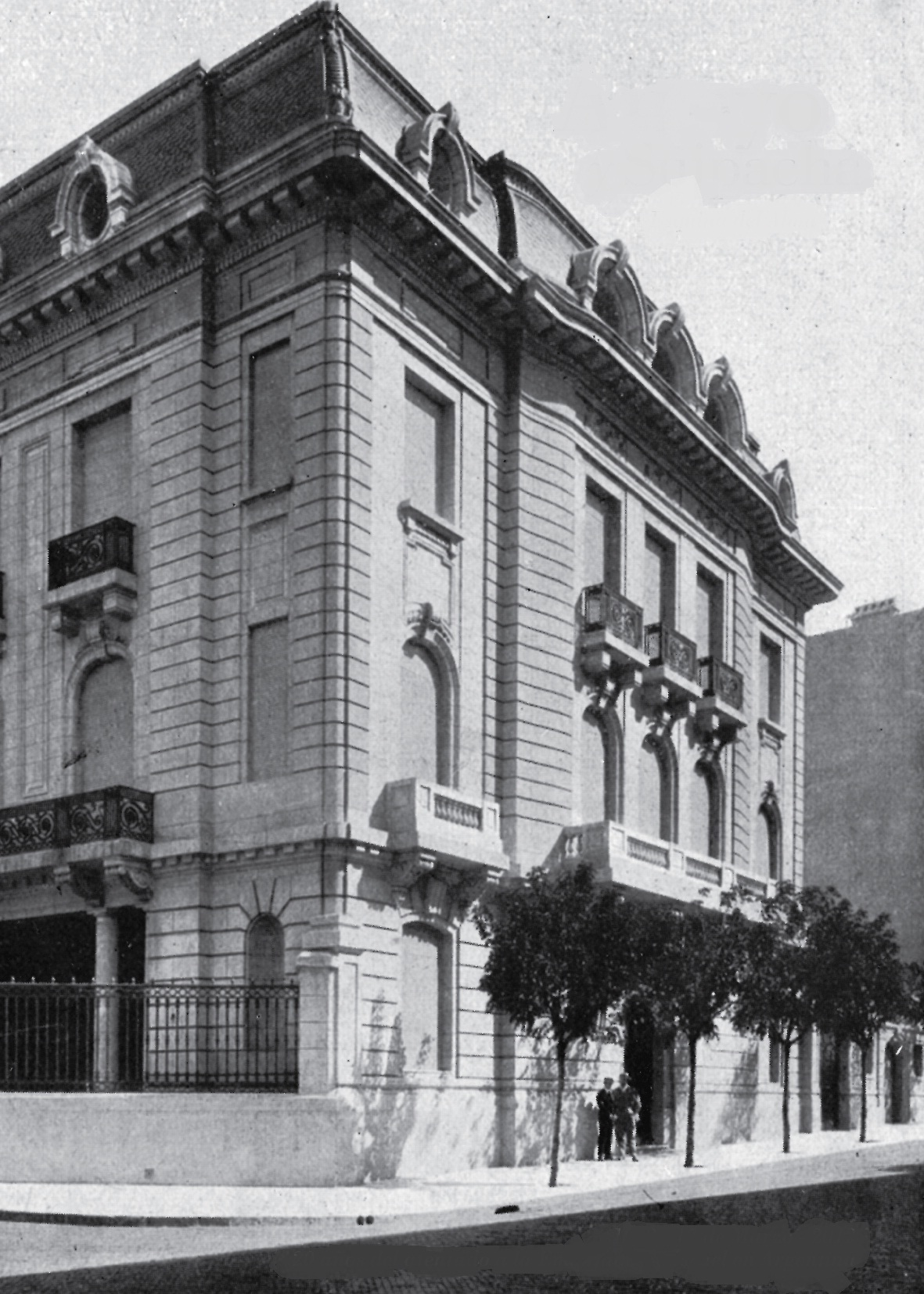
Former Israeli embassy in Argentina

- Argentina has an embassy in Tel Aviv.
- Israel has an embassy in Buenos Aires and honorary consulates in Córdoba, Mendoza, and Neuquén.

== See also ==
- Argentine Jews in Israel
- History of the Jews in Argentina
- International recognition of Israel
