= Free trade agreements of Israel =

Overview of free trade agreements of the State of Israel

Free trade agreements of Israel Israel Agreement in force Agreement signed and waiting for approval Agreement in negotiations Potential agreement QIZ Agreement only Custom union with the Palestinian Authority (Area A and B)

The free trade agreements of Israel represent Israel's cooperation in multinational trade pacts and participation in the world economy. Israel's first free trade agreement was signed in 1985 with the United States. Since then, Israel has signed 16 free trade agreements (free trade agreements) with 48 countries and economic blocks such as the European Union, the European Free Trade Association and Mercosur.

Israel is a General Agreement on Tariffs and Trade (GATT) member since 5 July 1962, member of the World Trade Organization since 21 April 1995 as it succussed the GATT, and from 7 September 2010 member of the OECD.

Israel signed the United Nations Convention on Contracts for the International Sale of Goods on 22 January 2002, and Israel is also member of the United Nations Commission on International Trade Law for the years 2004 to 2028.

== Free trade agreements summary table ==
Agreement name	Countries/blocs	Start of negotiations	Date of signature	Approval and entry into force	Status	Updates
	Australia	-	-	-	Discussions	
	Bahrain	October 2022	-	-	Negotiations	
Canada–Israel Free Trade Agreement	Canada	1994	31 July 1996	1 January 1997	In force	2019
	China	September 2016	-	-	Negotiations	
Colombia–Israel Free Trade Agreement	Colombia	March 2012	30 September 2013	11 August 2020	In force	
Costa Rica-Israel Free Trade Agreement	Costa Rica	29 March 2023	8 December 2025	-	Signed	
	Eurasian Economic Union	April 2018	-	-	Negotiations	
EFTA –Israel Free Trade Agreement	EFTA (European Free Trade Association)	June 1991	17 September 1992	1 January 1993	In force	2018
European Union–Israel Association Agreement	European Union	December 1993	20 November 1995	1 June 2000	In force	2010; 2013
	Georgia	2 May 2023	-	-	Negotiations	
Guatemala–Israel Free Trade Agreement	Guatemala	29 August 2019	8 September 2022	1 March 2024	In force	
	India	May 2010	-	-	Negotiations	
	Japan	22 November 2022	-	-	Negotiations	
Israel–Jordan Free Trade Agreement	Jordan	1994	26 October 1994	25 October 1995	In force	2004
Israel–Mercosur Free Trade Agreement	Mercosur	June 2005	18 December 2007	9 September 2011	In force	2012
Israel–Mexico Free Trade Agreement	Mexico	April 1998	10 April 2000	1 July 2000	In force	2008
	Moldova	8 August 2023	-	-	Negotiations	
Israel–Panama Free Trade Agreement	Panama	26 November 2015	8 May 2018	1 January 2020	In force	
	Serbia	11 September 2024	-	-	Negotiations	
Israel–South Korea Free Trade Agreement	South Korea	May 2016	12 May 2021	1 January 2023	In force	
	Thailand	-	-	-	Discussions	
Israel–Turkey Free Trade Agreement	Turkey	1994	14 March 1996	1 May 1997	In force	2006; 2007
Israel–Ukraine Free Trade Agreement	Ukraine	2013	21 January 2019	1 January 2021	In force	
Israel-UAE Free Trade Agreement	United Arab Emirates	November 2021	31 May 2022	1 April 2023	In force	
Israel–United Kingdom Trade and Partnership Agreement	United Kingdom	EU–Israel Free Trade Agreement (before Brexit)	18 February 2019	1 January 2021	In force	
Israel–United States Free Trade Agreement	United States	1 January 1984	22 April 1985	1 September 1985	In force	2004; 2017 2022
Israel–Vietnam Free Trade Agreement	Vietnam	2016	24 July 2023	17 November 2024	In force	

== Free Trade Agreements in force ==
The current active bilateral and multilateral Free Trade Agreements of Israel with countries and trade blocks.

=== Israel – United States Free Trade Agreement ===
Israel and the United States signed the Israel–United States Free Trade Agreement, which was the first United States free trade agreement with a country outside of North America, and the first free trade agreement of Israel. The free trade agreement came into force on 1 September 1985. To be party to the free trade agreement, goods must be a product of Israel or the United States or have had a significant portion produced in Israel or the United States. The negotiations for the FTA began on 1 January 1984 after discussions between the former US president Ronald Reagan and the former Israeli prime minister Yitzhak Shamir in November 1983. The FTA was signed by Ronald Reagan into law the Trade and Tariff Act of 1984 which paved the way for FTA between Israel and the United States. The FTA was signed on April 22, 1985, and came into force on 1 September 1985. The FTA reduced tariffs on different products in few steps until 1995.

The free trade agreement of 1985 was not including agricultural products, and was decided in article 6 of the free trade agreement that the sector of agricultural products isn't included or will come separately in other agreement. In 2004, the agreement was extended to agricultural products.

Mutual recognition agreement on telecommunications equipment was signed in 2004, and a joint committee decided to make some changes to the Annex 3 of the Israel – United States Free Trade Agreement (1985) regarding the documentation of Rules of Origin. Additional extension to the Agricultural Agreement (2004) was made in 2022.

The United States and Israel are also party to the Qualified Industrial Zone agreement (QIZ agreement), which serves to promote co-production and economic cooperation between Israel and Egypt. The QIZ agreement was signed on December 14, 2004, in Cairo between Egypt, Israel, and the United States. The QIZ agreement came into force in 2005.

Israel – United States Free Trade Agreement and extensions
Agreement name	Agreement text	etc.
Israel – United States Free Trade Agreement (1985)	in English by the Israeli Ministry of Economy	
Israel – United States Free Trade Agreement (1985)	in Hebrew by the Israeli Ministry of Economy	
Israel – United States Free Trade Agreement (1985)	in English by the Office of the United States Trade Representative	
Israel – United States Agricultural Agreement (2004) as an extension to the Free Trade Agreement (1985)	in English by the Israeli Ministry of Economy	
Mutual recognition agreement on telecommunications equipment (2004)	in English by the Israeli Ministry of Economy	
Extension to the Agricultural Agreement of 2004 (2022)	in English by the Government of United States	

=== European Free Trade Association – Israel Free Trade Agreement ===
Israel and the European Free Trade Association (EFTA), which includes Switzerland, Norway, Iceland and Liechtenstein, negotiated free trade agreement in June 1991, signed the agreement in 1992 which came into force a year later on 1 January 1993. The free trade agreement originally included trade of goods, rules of origin, and intellectual property rights, and on 22 November 2018 was updated to extend to agricultural products. The extension came into force on 1 August 2021.

Israel – EFTA Trade Agreement and extensions
Agreement name	Agreement text	etc.
EFTA – Israel Free Trade Agreement (1993)	in English by the Israeli Ministry of Economy	
EFTA – Israel Free Trade Agreement (1993)	in Hebrew by the Israeli Ministry of Economy	
EFTA – Israel Free Trade Agreement (1993)	in English by EFTA	
EFTA – Israel Agreement on Agricultural (2018)	in English between Israel and Iceland	
EFTA – Israel Agreement on Agricultural (2018)	in English between Israel and Norway	
EFTA – Israel Agreement on Agricultural (2018)	in English between Israel and Switzerland	

=== Israel - Jordan Free Trade Agreement ===
The free trade agreement between Israel and Jordan was signed alongside wide the peace treaty on 26 October 1994, and one year after on 25 October 1995 the agreement came into force. The agreement of 1995 includes rules of origin and goods that are 100%, 50% or 30% duty-free. The free trade agreement was updated on 23 December 2004.

Israel – Jordan Trade Agreement and extensions
Agreement name	Agreement text	etc.
Israel - Jordan Free Trade Agreement (1995)	in English by the Israeli Ministry of Economy	
Israel - Jordan Free Trade Agreement (1995)	in Hebrew by the Israeli Ministry of Economy	
Israel - Jordan Free Trade Agreement extension (2004)	in English by the Israeli Ministry of Economy	
Israel - Jordan Free Trade Agreement extension (2004)	in Hebrew by the Israeli Ministry of Economy	

=== European Union – Israel Free Trade Agreement ===
The free trade agreement between Israel and the European Union began and are part of the European Union Association Agreement, Euro-Mediterranean Association Agreement or the Euro-Mediterranean Agreement. The negotiations between Israel and the European Community began in December 1993, signed on 20 November 1995 and came into force on 1 June 2000. The original free trade agreement included clauses on rules of origin, duties, service and industrial trades and co-operations, tourism, and transport. Negotiations on additional agricultural trade agreement between the EU and Israel began in 2008, signed on 20 October 2009, and came into force in January 2010.

On 20 November 2012 Israel and the EU signed the Agreement on Conformity Assessment and Acceptance of Industrial, giving good manufacturing practice exemption to the Israeli medical industry and easing the export of medical goods from Israel to the European Union. The agreement came into force in 2013.

In 2002 Israel began the Operation Defensive Shield due to the murder of approximately 730 Israeli civilians and tourists in different terror attacks during the Second Intifada. Some politicians of the European Parliament called to suspend the Association Agreement, as the EU member state were 15 during 2002. The Spanish Foreign Minister Josep Pique haven't ruled out such scenario. Move that was unlikely as other countries such as Germany, UK, Denmark, and the Netherlands were against it.

After the 7th October massacre in 2023 made by Hamas and other Palestinian militant groups and the start of the ground operation, Spain, Ireland, and Belgium questioned the agreements with Israel. The prime minister of Belgium Alexander De Croo called for sanctions against Israel, The prime minister of Ireland even considered to unilaterally suspend trade with Israel, The Spanish Prime Minister Pedro Sanchez together with Ireland tried to push other EU members to suspend the free trade agreement with Israel, and Josep Borrell the Spanish head of the European Union's foreign policy pushed for suspension of relations with Israel. But most EU countries as, Finland, Germany, Austria, the Czech Republic, Hungary, Denmark, the Netherlands, Italy and Greece were against such actions from Josep Borrell, Spain, Ireland, and Belgium against Israel.

Israel – European Union Trade Agreement and extensions
Agreement name	Agreement text	etc.
European Union – Israel Free Trade Agreement (1995)	in English by the Israeli Ministry of Economy	
European Union – Israel Free Trade Agreement (1995)	in Hebrew by the Israeli Ministry of Economy	
European Union – Israel Free Trade Agreement (1995)	in English by the European Union	
European Union – Israel Agricultural Trade Agreement (2010)	in English by the Israeli Ministry of Economy	
European Union – Israel Agricultural Trade Agreement (2010)	in Hebrew by the Israeli Ministry of Economy	
European Union – Israel Agricultural Trade Agreement (2010)	in English by the European Union	
Agreement on Conformity Assessment and Acceptance of Industrial - ACAA Products (2013)	in English by the Israeli Ministry of Economy	
Agreement on Conformity Assessment and Acceptance of Industrial - ACAA Products (2013)	in Hebrew by the Israeli Ministry of Economy	
Agreement on Conformity Assessment and Acceptance of Industrial - ACAA Products (2013)	in English by the European Union	

=== Israel - Turkey Free Trade Agreement ===
Israel and Turkey negotiated free trade agreement since 1994, signed a free trade agreement on 14 March 1996, which came into force on 1 May 1997.The free trade agreement covers topics including duties on agriculture, industry and services to right of origin. The free trade agreement was updated in 2006 and 2007.

After the 7th October massacre in 2023 made by Hamas and other Palestinians and the start of the ground operation, Turkey decided to stop exports to Israel on may the third 2024 ruled by the Turkish President Recep Tayyip Erdogan. In response, the Israeli Finance Minister Bezalel Smotrich called to abolish the free trade agreement with Turkey and also to impose 100% tariff on import from Turkey. Local Turkish media claimed that products from Turkey arrive to Israel via the Palestinian Authority as export from Turkey to the Palestinian Authority was raised to 526% after the ban.

=== Canada - Israel Free Trade Agreement ===
Israel and Canada negotiated free trade agreement since 1994, and signed their first free trade agreement on 31 July 1996 which came into force on 1 January 1997, listing a number of goods without duties or with low fees of duty. Israel and Canada also signed an agreement on telecommunication equipment. The free trade agreement was updated in 2019, eliminating tariffs on goods from Israel and Canada.

=== Israel - Mexico Free Trade Agreement ===
Israel and Mexico signed a free trade agreement on 10 April 2000, and updated the free trade agreement in 2008 on the matter of technology.

=== Israel - Mercosur Free Trade Agreement ===
Israel and Mercosur signed a free trade agreement on 8 December 2007 and the free trade agreement came into force on 1 June 2010. Venezuela suspended their relationship with Israel in 2009, and was later suspended from Mercosur in 2016. Mercosur extended the free trade agreement with Israel in 2012.

=== Colombia - Israel Free Trade Agreement ===
The free trade agreement between Israel and Colombia was signed in 2013 and came into force in 2020. The free trade agreement includes exemption or reduction of duties on different types of industrial goods, which enjoys 5% - 35% duties and other sectors such as agriculture.

=== Israel - Panama Free Trade Agreement ===
The free trade agreement between Israel and Panama was signed in 2018 and came into force in 2020.

=== Israel - Ukraine Free Trade Agreement ===
Israel and Ukraine began negotiations on free trade agreement in 2013 as most of the negotiations took place between 2016 and 2018. The fifth round of negotiations took place on March 8–9, 2017 in Tel Aviv, and the 11th round took place on June 19, 2018, in Jerusalem. The FTA was signed During state visit of the Ukrainian president Petro Poroshenko to Israel on 21 January 2019 alongside the Israeli prime minister Benjamin Netanyahu. The Verkhovna Rada ratified the FTA with Israel on 11 July 2019, and was later ratified by the Knesset. The free trade agreement came into force on 1 January 2021. The agreement exempted from duties goods such as industrial products, agricultural products, raw materials and more.

Israel – Ukraine Trade Agreement and extensions
Agreement name	Agreement text	etc.
Israel – Ukraine Free Trade Agreement (2021)	in English by the Israeli Ministry of Economy	
Israel – Ukraine Free Trade Agreement (2021)	in Hebrew by the Israeli Ministry of Economy	

=== Israel - United Kingdom Free Trade Agreement ===
Due to Brexit, the United Kingdom withdrew from the free trade agreement between the EU and Israel. Israel and the United Kingdom signed their free trade agreement in 2019 before Brexit came into effect. The free trade agreement came into force on 1 January 2021 and replaced the Israel-EU free trade agreement.

=== Israel - South Korea Free Trade Agreement ===
Israel and South Korea have signed a free trade agreement on 12 May 2021 to improve investments, removing barriers, and other topics. The FTA includes electronics, cosmetics, cars, and more. Date of entry is the 01.01.2023. The free trade agreement took effect at the end of 2022.

=== Israel - United Arab Emirates Free Trade Agreement ===
Israel and the United Arab Emirates (UAE) signed a free trade agreement on 31 May 2022. Tariffs will be removed or reduced on 96% of goods traded between the nations. The UAE predicted the Comprehensive Economic Partnership Agreement would boost annual bilateral trade to more than $10 billion within five years.

Israel and the United Arab Emirates ratified their free trade agreement on 11 December 2022. The free trade agreement went into effect on 1 April 2023.

=== Guatemala - Israel Free Trade Agreement ===
The agreement between Guatemala and Israel which was signed on 8 September 2022 and came into force on the first of March 2024 covers the following in order to promote relations and trade:

- Rules of origin
- Mutual Administrative Assistance in Customs Matters
- Trade Cooperation

=== Israel - Vietnam Free Trade Agreement ===
Early discussion on free trade agreement took place in 2013 during a visit to Vietnam by Israeli delegation of Israeli agricultural technology companies with the Israel Export Institute. On 30 September 2014, the Economy minister of Israel Naftali Bennett signed a partnership agreement with the Science minister of Vietnam to develop future free trade agreement. At the end of the year on 2. December 2015 a Vietnamese delegation including the Vietnamese Deputy Prime Minister Hoàng Trung Hải visited Israel and meet with the Israeli prime minister Benjamin Netanyahu, which a statement on negotiations on free trade agreement was given. Negotiations took place from 2016. Israel and Vietnam signed the free trade agreement on 24. July 2023 and the agreement came into force on 17 November 2024.

== Free trade agreements not in force ==
=== Signed free trade agreements ===
Israel has signed bilateral free trade agreements with the following countries and trade blocs:

==== Costa Rica ====
Memorandum of Understanding on negotiations for free trade agreement was signed on 29 March 2023 in Israel between the Minister of Foreign Trade of Costa Rica, Manuel Tovar Rivera and the Minister of Economy and Industry of Israel, Nir Barkat. The memorandum begins the start of negotiations for free trade agreement. On 8 December 2025, Costa Rica and Israel officially signed the free trade agreement.

=== Under negotiations ===
Israel is negotiating bilateral free trade agreements with the following countries and trade blocs:

==== Bahrain ====
First round of negotiations was made in 2022.

==== China ====
The negotiations between Israel and The People's Republic of China started at September 2016. Between 2016 and 2019 8 negotiation rounds were made, and the first direct talks were made in 2019. The FTA was supposed to be signed during 2023 as the agreement was finalized. No development since 2023.

==== Eurasian Economic Union ====
The negotiations between Israel and the Eurasian Economic Union started in April 2018 after first discussions in November 2016. According to the Eurasian Economic Union the negotiation are at the six round to this date. As to the December 2021, almost 3 months before the Russian invasion of Ukraine, no development was made.

Since 2022, as the Russian invasion of Ukraine continues and the integration of Iran with the EaEU the free trade agreement between Israel and the EaEU sees more obstacles. The Russian annexation and occupation of Crimea, and other Ukrainian territories in eastern Ukraine could lead to problems regarding rules of origin. Also the unrecognised territories Transnistria, Abkhazia and South Ossetia wish to join the EaEU. Israel doesn't recognise the three and sees them as integral part of Georgia and Moldova, countries which Israel also negotiating on free trade agreement. On 25 December 2023 the EaEU and Iran have sign free trade agreement and Iran shows aspirations for further integration as Iran applying to join the EaEU as observer state as it was sent on 27 May 2024. Since the application, Iran and the EaEU discussed the application and the EaEU informed Iran the process, only waiting for the response of the member states. Trade with the Islamic Republic of Iran is illegal by the Israeli law, Trading with the Enemy Ordinance - 1939 (Iran, Iraq, Syria, and Lebanon), and Enlargement of countries like Iran would make any free trade agreement between Israel and the EaEU less likeable.

==== Georgia ====
Declaration on launching a joint feasibility study was signed on 10 May 2018 between the ministers of economy of Israel and Georgia. During visit to Israel in May 2023 of the Georgian Minister of Foreign Affairs, Ilia Darchiashvili, the declaration on completion of the technical and economic feasibility study for a free trade agreement was signed on 2 May 2023. The completion of the feasibility study marked the entry into free trade agreement negotiations. The Georgian Ambassador to Israel, Lasha Zhvania, set the start of the negotiations to take place in 2024.

==== India ====
The negotiations between Israel and India started in Mai 2010, as 8 rounds of negotiations were made until November, 2013. The negotiations have been resumed on 9 February 2015.

The negotiations have been resumed in 2022 after talks at the end of 2021. During the Israel-India Business Summit 2025 the Israeli Minister of Economy and Trade Nir Barkat said that Israel and India are heading towards signing the agreement.

==== Japan ====
Early talks on an Israeli - Japanese free trade agreement were in January 2019 in Jerusalem between the ministers of economy of Israel and Japan, and businesspeople, including executives from Mitsubishi Corporation, Toshiba Corporation, and Sony. On November 22, 2022, the Israeli Prime Minister Yair Lapid visited Tokyo remarking on 70 years of Israeli - Japanese relations, and also to sign an agreement to enter negotiations for a free trade agreement. Negotiations between Israel and Japan started in 2023.

==== Moldova ====
Before the visit of the Israeli Foreign Minister Eli Cohen to Moldova, the Israeli Minister of Economy and Trade Nir Barkat and Ambassador of Moldova to Israel Alexandr Roitman meet on 29 July 2023 to discuss free trade agreement between the countries. Eli Cohen visited Moldova on 8 August 2023 and signed the agreement to start FTA negotiations with the Moldavan Minister of Foreign Affairs and European Integration, Nicu Popescu. Agreement to start FTA negotiations usually takes years, but was signed only after 8 days.

==== Serbia ====
Announcement by the president of Israel Isaac Herzog and the president of Serbia Aleksandar Vučić on 11 September 2024 during a state visit of Isaac Herzog to Serbia. Aleksandar Vučić said that he expect to finalize the Free Trade Agreement with Israel within a few months.

=== Potential agreements ===
==== Australia ====
The Australian Department of Foreign Affairs and Trade has completed a free trade agreement feasibility study in February 2021. Early discussions in October 2021, and in January 2022 between ministers and officials took place.

In January 2025 the Australian Shadow Trade and Tourism Minister Kevin Hogan called to reinvigorate the free trade agreement negotiations with Israel.

==== Thailand ====
First discussions on a free trade agreement between Israel and Thailand were held during the World Economic Forum of 2025 in Davos between the Israeli Minister of Economy and Trade Nir Barkat and the Thai Minister of Commerce Pichai Naripthaphan. Barkat and Pichai have discussed the formation of a joint trade Committee as a pre negotiations step before starting formal negotiations.

== Statistics ==
Trade statistics of trade between Israel and countries in which Israel has free trade agreements

=== Israel - Canada Trade ===
Israel - Canada trade in millions USD-$
	Israel imports Canada exports	Canada imports Israel exports	Total trade value
2023	374.9	705.1	1080
2022	471.7	1042.4	1514.1
2021	334.8	612.1	946.9
2020	276.4	567	843.4
2019	276.9	625.4	902.3
2018	331.9	779	1110.9
2017	299.2	663.4	962.6
2016	283.2	594.5	877.7
2015	263.2	556.3	819.5
2014	373.2	587.9	961.1
2013	408.7	635.2	1043.9
2012	399.5	767	1166.5
2011	412.5	807.1	1219.6
2010	399	749.5	1148.5
2009	294.4	578.3	872.7
2008	509.4	901.7	1411.1
2007	433.7	714.3	1148
2006	369.1	577.9	947
2005	320.4	482.7	803.1
2004	247.1	395.1	642.2
2003	233.5	326.5	560
2002	375.5	297	672.5

=== Israel - Colombia Trade ===
Israel - Colombia trade in millions USD-$
	Israel imports Colombia exports	Colombia imports Israel exports	Total trade value
2023	14.9	108.3	123.2
2022	15.7	138.7	154.4
2021	18.4	92.5	110.9
2020	19.2	72	91.2
2019	11.6	86.7	98.3
2018	12.8	80.6	93.4
2017	14.7	83.4	98.1
2016	15.4	88.8	104.2
2015	13.1	134.1	147.2
2014	15.6	218.1	233.7
2013	16.3	207.8	224.1
2012	17.1	140.4	157.5
2011	13.2	102.3	115.5
2010	8.4	124.8	133.2
2009	53.9	170	223.9
2008	445.2	166.7	611.9
2007	584.8	152.6	737.4
2006	473.1	123.5	596.6
2005	535.3	84.2	619.5
2004	121	86.1	207.1
2003	107.1	68.2	175.3
2002	138.8	59.6	198.4

=== Israel - EFTA (European Free Trade Association) Trade ===
Israel - EFTA trade in millions USD-$
	Israel imports EFTA exports	EFTA imports Israel exports	Total trade value
2023	5192.8	737.3	5930.1
2022	6542.3	1596.7	8139
2021	6898.1	812.3	7710.4
2020	5466	505.5	5971.5
2019	5847.6	1144.7	6992.3
2018	8125.1	1410.9	9536
2017	5747.8	1512.6	7260.4
2016	4468.1	1524.4	5992.5
2015	4575	1573	6148
2014	5397.6	1503.7	6901.3
2013	4532.2	1450.9	5983.1
2012	4170.3	1222.4	5392.7
2011	4100.5	1513.6	5614.1
2010	3347.2	1114.1	4461.3
2009	3353.8	1006.5	4360.3
2008	4043.7	1289.5	5333.2
2007	2960.6	1104.7	4065.3
2006	2893	872.7	3765.7
2005	2545.5	970.3	3515.8
2004	2775.6	839.6	3615.2
2003	2153.4	557.1	2710.5
2002	2154.8	434.9	2589.7

==== Trade with the European Free Trade Association member countries ====
===== Iceland =====
Israel - Iceland trade in millions USD-$
	Israel imports Iceland exports	Iceland imports Israel exports	Total trade value
2023	3.1	3.9	7
2022	4.5	3.2	7.7
2021	6	3.1	9.1
2020	3.3	2.1	5.4
2019	2.8	2.1	4.9
2018	2.4	4.3	6.7
2017	12.9	3.4	16.3
2016	2.5	2.5	5
2015	3.3	12	15.3
2014	27.9	3.9	31.8
2013	4.9	2.5	7.4
2012	3.5	5.7	9.2
2011	6.1	4.3	10.4
2010	19.8	3.1	22.9
2009	11.8	2.8	14.6
2008	17.7	3.5	21.2
2007	13.3	4.9	18.2
2006	15	4.7	19.7
2005	14.3	6.7	21
2004	13.7	4.5	18.2
2003	12.3	5.8	18.1
2002	10.1	3.8	13.9

===== Norway =====
Israel - Norway trade in millions USD-$
	Israel imports Norway exports	Norway imports Israel exports	Total trade value
2023	265	55	320
2022	448.6	63.2	511.8
2021	274.1	66.3	340.4
2020	208.4	58.2	266.6
2019	226	57.2	283.2
2018	365.5	54.7	420.2
2017	206.2	52.7	258.9
2016	177.5	55.5	233
2015	145.8	65.4	211.2
2014	179.7	75.2	254.9
2013	129.9	72.4	202.3
2012	111.4	83.7	195.1
2011	124.2	70.9	195.1
2010	107.2	63.5	170.7
2009	52	61.4	113.4
2008	52.4	75.6	128
2007	65	63.7	128.7
2006	72.1	59	131.1
2005	66.5	63.3	129.8
2004	79.8	52.8	132.6
2003	79.1	46.4	125.5
2002	69.5	46.5	116

===== Switzerland =====
Israel - Switzerland trade in millions USD-$
	Israel imports Switzerland exports	Switzerland imports Israel exports	Total trade value
2023	4924.7	678.4	5603.1
2022	6089.2	1530.3	7619.5
2021	6618	742.9	7360.9
2020	5254.3	445.2	5699.5
2019	5618.8	1085.4	6704.2
2018	7757.2	1351.9	9109.1
2017	5528.7	1456.5	6985.2
2016	4288.1	1466.4	5754.5
2015	4425.9	1495.6	5921.5
2014	5190	1424.6	6614.6
2013	4397.4	1376	5773.4
2012	4055.4	1133	5188.4
2011	3970.2	1438.4	5408.6
2010	3220.2	1047.5	4267.7
2009	3290	942.3	4232.3
2008	3973.6	1210.4	5184
2007	2882.3	1036.1	3918.4
2006	2805.9	809	3614.9
2005	2464.7	900.3	3365
2004	2682.1	782.3	3464.4
2003	2062	504.9	2566.9
2002	2075.2	384.6	2459.8

=== Israel - EU (European Union) Trade ===
Israel - EU trade in millions USD-$
	Israel imports European Union exports	European Union imports Israel exports	Total trade value
2023	30745.3	17904.9	48650.2
2022	34323	17993.7	52316.7
2021	31372.2	14432.7	45804.9
2020	24501	10954.4	35455.4
2019	27677.9	17328.7	45006.6
2018	31624.8	17570.1	49194.9
2017	28471.5	18306.8	46778.3
2016	27362.8	15758.8	43121.6
2015	22572.5	16056.8	38629.3
2014	24131.8	18787.5	42919.3
2013	24414.1	18285.6	42699.7
2012	25131.3	17086.3	42217.6
2011	25438.8	18802.1	44240.9
2010	20409.4	15348.4	35757.8
2009	17491.7	12389.8	29881.5
2008	22513.4	17795	40308.4
2007	20687	15992.8	36679.8
2006	18027.9	13046.2	31074.1
2005	17588.2	12490.1	30078.3
2004	16813.1	10720.9	27534
2003	14402.3	8917.1	23319.4
2002	13805.8	7751.4	21557.2

==== Trade with European Union member countries ====
===== Austria =====
Austria - Israel trade in millions USD-$
	Israel imports Austria exports	Austria imports Israel exports	Total trade value
2023	602.7	102.1	704.8
2022	726.5	114.4	840.9
2021	666	107.7	773.7
2020	609.6	76.3	685.9
2019	530.6	73.5	604.1
2018	545.5	79	624.5
2017	532.9	63.2	596.1
2016	408.9	67.4	476.3
2015	408.1	73.3	481.4
2014	413.3	93.1	506.4
2013	335.5	88	423.5
2012	310.6	122.7	433.3
2011	347.6	181.2	528.8
2010	263.3	155.4	418.7
2009	267.3	99.9	367.2
2008	399.2	99.9	499.1
2007	297.1	118.5	415.6
2006	215	84.6	299.6
2005	202.9	80.5	283.4
2004	203.8	83.8	287.6
2003	153.8	68.3	222.1
2002	128.2	74.3	202.5

===== Belgium =====
Belgium - Israel trade in millions USD-$
	Israel imports Belgium exports	Belgium imports Israel exports	Total trade value
2023	3857.3	1594.3	5451.6
2022	4543.4	1996.9	6540.3
2021	4621.4	1974.7	6596.1
2020	3426.7	1458.3	4885
2019	3596.5	1636.9	5233.4
2018	3823.2	2193.5	6016.7
2017	4098.9	2704.8	6803.7
2016	3913.9	2507.3	6421.2
2015	3275	2487	5762
2014	3818.4	3299.6	7118
2013	3823.4	3118.3	6941.7
2012	3544.9	2929.1	6474
2011	4465	3767.5	8232.5
2010	3576.4	3116.8	6693.2
2009	2567.8	2371.8	4939.6
2008	4250.3	4618.7	8869
2007	4454.9	4070.8	8525.7
2006	3936.9	3068.4	7005.3
2005	4557.7	3679.5	8237.2
2004	4130.8	2898.1	7028.9
2003	3179.9	2320.9	5500.8
2002	3028.3	1863.2	4891.5

===== Bulgaria =====
Bulgaria - Israel trade in millions USD-$
	Israel imports Bulgaria exports	Bulgaria imports Israel exports	Total trade value
2023	151.2	78.9	230.1
2022	165.8	64.7	230.5
2021	143.2	51.2	194.4
2020	111.7	47.5	159.2
2019	106.6	39.9	146.5
2018	92	41	133
2017	97.8	51.9	149.7
2016	91	38.7	129.7
2015	82.7	88.8	171.5
2014	62.1	128.7	190.8
2013	62.2	53.8	116
2012	56.9	75.3	132.2
2011	62.1	219.3	281.4
2010	60.6	112.4	173
2009	42	69.8	111.8
2008	52	56.2	108.2
2007	63.8	54.3	118.1
2006	48.1	48	96.1
2005	48.2	42.2	90.4
2004	46	30.3	76.3
2003	35.2	23.7	58.9
2002	32.3	20.8	53.1

===== Croatia =====
Croatia - Israel trade in millions USD-$
	Israel imports Croatia exports	Croatia imports Israel exports	Total trade value
2023	33	24.2	57.2
2022	40.5	37.8	78.3
2021	42.3	21.4	63.7
2020	33	20.4	53.4
2019	41.3	51.9	93.2
2018	26	22.9	48.9
2017	26.7	17.8	44.5
2016	18.4	25.9	44.3
2015	36.2	19.6	55.8
2014	31.2	21.5	52.7
2013	22.5	20.9	43.4
2012	8.5	30.1	38.6
2011	4.9	30.4	35.3
2010	7.1	21.8	28.9
2009	15.3	25.2	40.5
2008	5.9	23.2	29.1
2007	3.1	27.8	30.9
2006	4	12.1	16.1
2005	5.7	10.1	15.8
2004	5.4	15.6	21
2003	5.7	9.8	15.5
2002	3.2	8	11.2

===== Cyprus =====
Cyprus - Israel trade in millions USD-$
	Israel imports Cyprus exports	Cyprus imports Israel exports	Total trade value
2023	291.7	781.7	1073.4
2022	298.7	1054.1	1352.8
2021	270	575	845
2020	224	316.7	540.7
2019	225.2	647.6	872.8
2018	427.8	750.8	1178.6
2017	368.2	404.5	772.7
2016	319.2	311.1	630.3
2015	349.4	418.4	767.8
2014	392.2	950.6	1342.8
2013	463.5	1126.5	1590
2012	964.7	905	1869.7
2011	318.9	937.4	1256.3
2010	152.6	755.6	908.2
2009	43.9	566.8	610.7
2008	68.7	880.5	949.2
2007	65.1	623.1	688.2
2006	32.2	490.8	523
2005	25.2	540.9	566.1
2004	122	343.1	465.1
2003	111.2	215.6	326.8
2002	22.5	191.4	213.9

===== Czech Republic =====
Czech - Israeli trade in millions USD-$
	Israel imports Czech Republic exports	Czech Republic imports Israel exports	Total trade value
2023	847.7	199.6	1047.3
2022	857	176	1033
2021	826.1	154.9	981
2020	670	123.9	793.9
2019	698.7	135.4	834.1
2018	660.6	184.1	844.7
2017	572.8	143.9	716.7
2016	612.4	130.9	743.3
2015	469.8	127	596.8
2014	607	168.1	775.1
2013	534.7	148.6	683.3
2012	516.5	172.3	688.8
2011	389.2	158.1	547.3
2010	268.1	149.9	418
2009	188	132.3	320.3
2008	165.6	161.6	327.2
2007	136.4	132.6	269
2006	111.5	107.3	218.8
2005	96.6	65.5	162.1
2004	104.1	72.9	177
2003	76.8	53.7	130.5
2002	75.8	42.2	118

===== Denmark =====
Denmark - Israeli trade in millions USD-$
	Israel imports Denmark exports	Denmark imports Israel exports	Total trade value
2023	525.3	97.6	622.9
2022	507.4	92.3	599.7
2021	413.1	101.3	514.4
2020	323.3	98.6	421.9
2019	297.6	94.1	391.7
2018	259.7	96.4	356.1
2017	282.3	102.6	384.9
2016	251.2	76.8	328
2015	243.8	75.8	319.6
2014	253.3	94.3	347.6
2013	281	91.2	372.2
2012	234.2	87.7	321.9
2011	232.4	105.1	337.5
2010	200.4	100.4	300.8
2009	200.8	136.2	337
2008	215.4	167	382.4
2007	185.6	108.4	294
2006	175.2	92.4	267.6
2005	186.7	98	284.7
2004	139.4	84.1	223.5
2003	146.7	72.2	218.9
2002	194	64	258

===== Estonia =====
Estonia - Israel trade in millions USD-$
	Israel imports Estonia exports	Estonia imports Israel exports	Total trade value
2023	64.1	16.9	81
2022	69.4	12.6	82
2021	64.3	17.3	81.6
2020	72.3	8.7	81
2019	87	9.7	96.7
2018	66.6	12	78.6
2017	56.9	9.2	66.1
2016	52.2	9.7	61.9
2015	58.2	11.6	69.8
2014	89.9	16.9	106.8
2013	69.6	17.7	87.3
2012	48.3	15.9	64.2
2011	56.4	13.5	69.9
2010	46.1	10.3	56.4
2009	35.8	7.6	43.4
2008	46.2	13.7	59.9
2007	26.3	16.6	42.9
2006	22.2	13.9	36.1
2005	23.4	8.8	32.2
2004	25.1	4	29.1
2003	16.1	5.2	21.3
2002	15.6	1.9	17.5

===== Finland =====
Finland - Israel trade in millions USD-$
	Israel imports Finland exports	Finland imports Israel exports	Total trade value
2023	318.5	80.1	398.6
2022	350.5	79.7	430.2
2021	425.5	56	481.5
2020	356.5	47.8	404.3
2019	273.1	50.4	323.5
2018	284.9	57.1	342
2017	262.1	65.6	327.7
2016	260.4	85.8	346.2
2015	273.7	86.2	359.9
2014	285.3	123.5	408.8
2013	285.1	121.9	407
2012	271	145.9	416.9
2011	293.7	151	444.7
2010	359.6	141.2	500.8
2009	332.6	121.1	453.7
2008	370.2	169.1	539.3
2007	339.5	155.3	494.8
2006	289.5	125.9	415.4
2005	263.4	121.3	384.7
2004	315	129.9	444.9
2003	242.1	89.1	331.2
2002	263.5	83.3	346.8

===== France =====
France - Israel trade in millions USD-$
	Israel imports France exports	France imports Israel exports	Total trade value
2023	2618.1	1427.5	4045.6
2022	3551	2081.4	5632.4
2021	2368.3	1412.9	3781.2
2020	2137.6	1153.7	3291.3
2019	2062.7	1542.6	3605.3
2018	2197.6	1605.9	3803.5
2017	1755.5	1767.9	3523.4
2016	1690.3	1448	3138.3
2015	1605.2	1680.7	3285.9
2014	1560.8	1668.1	3228.9
2013	1544	1556.1	3100.1
2012	1646.2	1437.3	3083.5
2011	1625.5	1542	3167.5
2010	1517.2	1266.5	2783.7
2009	1428.7	1110.6	2539.3
2008	1889.2	1298	3187.2
2007	1480.9	1313.2	2794.1
2006	1301.5	1092.2	2393.7
2005	1203.8	882.6	2086.4
2004	1248.9	764	2012.9
2003	1182.6	684.6	1867.2
2002	1186.9	649	1835.9

===== Germany =====
Germany - Israel trade in millions USD-$
	Germany Exports Israel Imports	Israel Exports Germany Imports	Total Trade Value
2023	6515.8	2137.3	8653.1
2022	7075.7	1880.6	8956.3
2021	6560.4	1792.5	8352.9
2020	5230.2	1681.1	6911.3
2019	5582.7	1671.8	7254.5
2018	5420	1777.2	7197.2
2017	4721.8	1638.4	6360.2
2016	4069.6	1519.9	5589.5
2015	3808.3	1440.8	5249.1
2014	4652	1727.8	6379.8
2013	4667.7	1763.3	6431
2012	4621.8	1631.9	6253.7
2011	4566.5	1950	6516.5
2010	3678.8	1701.4	5380.2
2009	3361.8	1440.3	4802.1
2008	3940.5	1950.6	5891.1
2007	3484.3	1913	5397.3
2006	3201.4	1757.9	4959.3
2005	2986	1345.9	4331.9
2004	3090.2	1361	4451.2
2003	2731.1	1123.3	3854.4
2002	2347.8	1026.5	3374.3

===== Greece =====
Greece - Israel trade in millions USD-$
	Greece Exports Israel Imports	Israel Exports Greece Imports	Total Trade Value
2023	489	497.7	986.7
2022	587	666.7	1253.7
2021	506.6	472.2	978.8
2020	375.3	324.4	699.7
2019	321	442.6	763.6
2018	363.2	616.7	979.9
2017	322.6	601.5	924.1
2016	267.2	348.5	615.7
2015	224	394.7	618.7
2014	229.2	458.2	687.4
2013	201.4	253.3	454.7
2012	197	195.5	392.5
2011	263.5	207.3	470.8
2010	199.4	213.4	412.8
2009	200.7	295.3	496
2008	221.4	301	522.4
2007	284.5	290.9	575.4
2006	249.4	273.1	522.5
2005	226.6	205.7	432.3
2004	174	246.3	420.3
2003	155.3	222.4	377.7
2002	135.5	156.9	292.4

===== Hungary =====
Israel - Hungary trade in millions USD-$
	Israel import Hungary exports	Hungary imports Israel exports	Total trade value
2023	391.7	248.9	640.6
2022	358.1	146.1	504.2
2021	313.5	153.1	466.6
2020	244.8	126.1	370.9
2019	261.2	128.5	389.7
2018	301.1	138.2	439.3
2017	272.2	129.6	401.8
2016	372.7	120.7	493.4
2015	283.8	123.8	407.6
2014	304.7	169.7	474.4
2013	272.8	160.8	433.6
2012	390.3	189	579.3
2011	260	152.8	412.8
2010	268.6	106.9	375.5
2009	252.4	113.1	365.5
2008	288.8	174.5	463.3
2007	195.6	116.3	311.9
2006	399.1	97.6	496.7
2005	144.1	75.5	219.6
2004	171	78	249
2003	110.3	63.1	173.4
2002	77.3	50.8	128.1

===== Ireland =====
Israel - Ireland trade in millions USD-$
	Israel imports Ireland exports	Ireland imports Israel exports	Total trade value
2023	1870.7	3422.5	5293.2
2022	1920	2576.1	4496.1
2021	1975.7	1435.4	3411.1
2020	1216.1	198	1414.1
2019	1051.4	86.1	1137.5
2018	1179.1	104.4	1283.5
2017	868.4	68.3	936.7
2016	2066.6	83.5	2150.1
2015	1300.4	99.7	1400.1
2014	837.9	99.7	937.6
2013	935.2	154.1	1089.3
2012	1006	62.7	1068.7
2011	994.5	86.7	1081.2
2010	519.5	79.3	598.8
2009	473.1	92.4	565.5
2008	415.1	99.9	515
2007	368.1	118.9	487
2006	352.7	109.9	462.6
2005	367.4	160.2	527.6
2004	370.4	135.9	506.3
2003	252.4	85.5	337.9
2002	251.7	60.7	312.4

===== Itay =====
Israel - Italy trade in millions USD-$
	Israel imports Italy exports	Italy imports Israel exports	Total trade value
2023	3271.8	1285.9	4557.7
2022	3470.3	1524.4	4994.7
2021	3366.3	1378.1	4744.4
2020	2686.6	786.7	3473.3
2019	2799.7	949.5	3749.2
2018	2841.7	981.7	3823.4
2017	2777.8	935.2	3713
2016	2693.7	958.3	3652
2015	2490.7	849.1	3339.8
2014	2784.2	1093.5	3877.7
2013	2692.8	1157.6	3850.4
2012	2779.5	1149.9	3929.4
2011	3055.9	1390.5	4446.4
2010	2425.8	1253.2	3679
2009	2126	1103	3229
2008	2553.7	1668.8	4222.5
2007	2302.1	1284.4	3586.5
2006	1839.4	1072.7	2912.1
2005	1733.7	897.8	2631.5
2004	1565.7	810	2375.7
2003	1398.2	772.5	2170.7
2002	1530.5	693.7	2224.2

===== Latvia =====
Israel - Latvia trade in millions USD-$
	Israel imports Latvia exports	Latvia imports Israel exports	Total trade value
2023	58.4	30	88.4
2022	67.9	40.2	108.1
2021	65.1	33.6	98.7
2020	64.4	24.4	88.8
2019	51.1	28.1	79.2
2018	49.8	33.2	83
2017	50.6	29.9	80.5
2016	42	25.6	67.6
2015	37.6	40.1	77.7
2014	33.8	50.7	84.5
2013	31.7	60.2	91.9
2012	166.5	55.1	221.6
2011	68.2	47.7	115.9
2010	47.5	33.1	80.6
2009	100.6	25.3	125.9
2008	319.4	33.9	353.3
2007	258.8	32.5	291.3
2006	9.3	33.3	42.6
2005	6.7	21.4	28.1
2004	4.3	14.8	19.1
2003	4.1	13.9	18
2002	2.4	11.5	13.9

===== Lithuania =====
Israel - Lithuania trade in millions USD-$
	Israel imports Lithuania exports	Lithuania imports Israel exports	Total trade value
2023	126.9	56.4	183.3
2022	109	38.2	147.2
2021	102.3	37.1	139.4
2020	81.8	39.7	121.5
2019	68.9	36.3	105.2
2018	61.1	38.3	99.4
2017	44.6	39.3	83.9
2016	38.5	32.1	70.6
2015	32.9	31.6	64.5
2014	23.4	51.7	75.1
2013	26.9	43.5	70.4
2012	35.1	46.1	81.2
2011	33.3	38.9	72.2
2010	22.1	30.7	52.8
2009	13.7	19.8	33.5
2008	24.5	42.4	66.9
2007	21.8	26.2	48
2006	15.1	19	34.1
2005	9.6	14.1	23.7
2004	3.1	9	12.1
2003	3.8	4.5	8.3
2002	3.2	5	8.2

===== Luxemburg =====
Israel - Luxemburg trade in millions USD-$
	Israel imports Luxemburg exports	Luxemburg imports Israel exports	Total trade value
2023	141	48.7	189.7
2022	187	42.9	229.9
2021	166.3	19.9	186.2
2020	189.6	21.7	211.3
2019	141.6	12.6	154.2
2018	180.9	16.7	197.6
2017	178.8	17.3	196.1
2016	152.7	19.4	172.1
2015	195.3	22.2	217.5
2014	223.9	22.3	246.2
2013	242.3	20	262.3
2012	181.2	14.8	196
2011	219.8	13	232.8
2010	185	14.3	199.3
2009	117	10.8	127.8
2008	174	20.4	194.4
2007	91.9	15.3	107.2
2006	46.5	8.8	55.3
2005	30.5	11	41.5
2004	21	8.6	29.6
2003	29.7	4.3	34
2002	28.6	3.5	32.1

===== Malta =====
Israel - Malta trade in millions USD-$
	Israel imports Malta exports	Malta imports Israel exports	Total trade value
2023	65.9	183.7	249.6
2022	54.1	247.6	301.7
2021	99.5	273.2	372.7
2020	110.6	148.8	259.4
2019	103.9	323.6	427.5
2018	24.9	153.4	178.3
2017	34.7	177.7	212.4
2016	23.8	138.5	162.3
2015	21	136.1	157.1
2014	27.2	188.3	215.5
2013	17.3	364.6	381.9
2012	296.6	77.2	373.8
2011	79.5	317.9	397.4
2010	25.5	95.4	120.9
2009	10.3	41	51.3
2008	35.4	50.8	86.2
2007	26	90.8	116.8
2006	5.4	56.6	62
2005	12.3	22.7	35
2004	11.9	35.9	47.8
2003	36.8	5.6	42.4
2002	3.2	25.7	28.9

===== Netherlands =====
Israel - Netherlands trade in millions USD-$
	Israel imports Netherlands exports	Netherlands imports Israel exports	Total trade value
2023	3919.2	2658.9	6578.1
2022	4278.2	2439.3	6717.5
2021	3712.3	2234.1	5946.4
2020	2902.1	2462.8	5364.9
2019	2884	2176.2	5060.2
2018	3282.5	2275.6	5558.1
2017	2925.6	2303.8	5229.4
2016	2700.8	2139.6	4840.4
2015	2422.3	2154	4576.3
2014	2418.8	2484.9	4903.7
2013	2719.3	2095.1	4814.4
2012	2746.9	2248.6	4995.5
2011	2761.5	2160.6	4922.1
2010	2102.1	1818	3920.1
2009	1885.4	1550.8	3436.2
2008	2465.3	2035	4500.3
2007	2090.3	1609.3	3699.6
2006	1786.8	1312.2	3099
2005	1626.7	1259.7	2886.4
2004	1483.8	1232.8	2716.6
2003	1196.5	1085.1	2281.6
2002	1177.9	909.1	2087

===== Poland =====
Israel - Poland trade in millions USD-$
	Israel imports Poland exports	Poland imports Israel exports	Total trade value
2023	587.4	418.8	1006.2
2022	649.7	297.9	947.6
2021	629	223.9	852.9
2020	479	200.5	679.5
2019	447.1	510	957.1
2018	415.1	266.6	681.7
2017	435.3	247	682.3
2016	381	229	610
2015	269	231.7	500.7
2014	244.6	246.6	491.2
2013	237.9	214.9	452.8
2012	200.6	245.1	445.7
2011	238.7	251.3	490
2010	237.3	219.4	456.7
2009	169.8	202.2	372
2008	152.8	287.2	440
2007	127.7	237.1	364.8
2006	109.8	180.8	290.6
2005	93.8	146.4	240.2
2004	78.9	121.5	200.4
2003	59.9	94.9	154.8
2002	67.5	87.9	155.4

===== Portugal =====
Israel - Portugal trade in millions USD-$
	Israel imports Portugal exports	Portugal imports Israel exports	Total trade value
2023	338.9	135	473.9
2022	485	111.8	596.8
2021	405.8	79.3	485.1
2020	297.4	77	374.4
2019	247.6	98	345.6
2018	231.3	148.5	379.8
2017	210.8	107.9	318.7
2016	152.8	106.9	259.7
2015	113.6	113.2	226.8
2014	106.2	141.4	247.6
2013	120.7	122.5	243.2
2012	128.8	145.4	274.2
2011	147	126.7	273.7
2010	95	104.1	199.1
2009	100.1	111.3	211.4
2008	114.2	98.9	213.1
2007	126.2	90.9	217.1
2006	87.2	88.7	175.9
2005	77.9	73.3	151.2
2004	70.1	76.1	146.2
2003	66.4	49.5	115.9
2002	69.8	43.5	113.3

===== Romania =====
Israel - Romania trade in millions USD-$
	Israel imports Romania exports	Romania imports Israel exports	Total trade value
2023	311.8	509.8	821.6
2022	437.7	304.1	741.8
2021	482.7	169.8	652.5
2020	257.9	133.7	391.6
2019	237.9	118.6	356.5
2018	223.7	139.5	363.2
2017	213.9	128.3	342.2
2016	230.3	116.9	347.2
2015	175.5	128.5	304
2014	168	120.4	288.4
2013	164	112.4	276.4
2012	161.9	174.3	336.2
2011	145.2	153.6	298.8
2010	146.1	235.1	381.2
2009	112.3	135.6	247.9
2008	106.2	230.6	336.8
2007	119.2	240	359.2
2006	102.5	219.8	322.3
2005	100.3	186.8	287.1
2004	97.9	136.1	234
2003	76.7	120.9	197.6
2002	79	111.9	190.9

===== Slovakia =====
Israel - Slovakia trade in millions USD-$
	Israel imports Slovakia exports	Slovakia imports Israel exports	Total trade value
2023	203.4	20.1	223.5
2022	174.7	21.5	196.2
2021	242.6	22.9	265.5
2020	132.5	17.8	150.3
2019	186	17.7	203.7
2018	187.3	23.8	211.1
2017	245.8	17.9	263.7
2016	152.8	15.9	168.7
2015	262.9	27.9	290.8
2014	207.4	20.4	227.8
2013	111.5	17.1	128.6
2012	73.5	22.1	95.6
2011	94.4	27.4	121.8
2010	82.4	19.1	101.5
2009	60.9	23.4	84.3
2008	49.4	28.5	77.9
2007	17.2	18.5	35.7
2006	21.4	12.1	33.5
2005	23.5	11.9	35.4
2004	10.7	10.7	21.4
2003	14	10.2	24.2
2002	8.6	7.9	16.5

===== Slovenia =====
Israel - Slovenia trade in millions USD-$
	Israel imports Slovenia exports	Slovenia imports Israel exports	Total trade value
2023	96.4	739.8	836.2
2022	119.7	578.7	698.4
2021	92.2	366.1	458.3
2020	68.5	326.5	395
2019	63.8	336.8	400.6
2018	74.2	417.1	491.3
2017	323	374	697
2016	695.1	251.7	946.8
2015	107.5	268	375.5
2014	157.3	153.5	310.8
2013	167.5	142.9	310.4
2012	127.9	149.8	277.7
2011	224.5	170	394.5
2010	196	150.9	346.9
2009	122.4	124.4	246.8
2008	65.4	125.2	190.6
2007	97.1	100.3	197.4
2006	38.7	48.9	87.6
2005	31.6	65.8	97.4
2004	27.6	24.3	51.9
2003	27.1	31.3	58.4
2002	22	30.4	52.4

===== Spain =====
Israel - Spain trade in millions USD-$
	Israel imports Spain exports	Spain imports Israel exports	Total trade value
2023	1927.9	988.8	2916.7
2022	2110.8	1198.4	3309.2
2021	2032.6	1120.8	3153.4
2020	1526.3	874.8	2401.1
2019	1599.9	987.9	2587.8
2018	1584.4	882.6	2467
2017	1717.5	831	2548.5
2016	1577.3	896.1	2473.4
2015	1345.7	786.7	2132.4
2014	1419.3	1036.8	2456.1
2013	1381	1241.1	2622.1
2012	1201.9	1033.4	2235.3
2011	1183.4	984.2	2167.6
2010	975.4	1031.8	2007.2
2009	880.1	940.5	1820.6
2008	959.1	1108	2067.1
2007	811.9	1106	1917.9
2006	749	903	1652
2005	613.7	687.8	1301.5
2004	652.3	616.2	1268.5
2003	624.6	525.4	1150
2002	637.8	399.7	1037.5

===== Sweden =====
Israel - Sweden trade in millions USD-$
	Israel imports Sweden exports	Sweden imports Israel exports	Total trade value
2023	1108.7	119.7	1228.4
2022	1126.5	169.3	1295.8
2021	782.3	148.3	930.6
2020	706.5	158.5	865
2019	729.9	130	859.9
2018	714.4	172.7	887.1
2017	806.4	160.1	966.5
2016	495.2	145.5	640.7
2015	451.7	147.9	599.6
2014	521.4	182.4	703.8
2013	636.2	165.7	801.9
2012	653	155.4	808.4
2011	573.4	193.3	766.7
2010	552.4	165.7	718.1
2009	523.1	121	644.1
2008	693.6	181.9	875.5
2007	556	171.5	727.5
2006	443.4	126.6	570
2005	365.1	134.9	500
2004	328.7	112.1	440.8
2003	313.9	91.5	405.4
2002	313.6	104.8	418.4

=== Israel - Guatemala Trade ===
Israel - Guatemala trade in millions USD-$
	Israel imports Guatemala exports	Guatemala imports Israel exports	Total trade value
2023	3	27.7	30.7
2022	4.4	34.8	39.2
2021	4.6	30.5	35.1
2020	5.2	26.6	31.8
2019	4.2	23.7	27.9
2018	4.3	23.8	28.1
2017	3.2	26.6	29.8
2016	2.5	29.7	32.2
2015	1.8	27.4	29.2
2014	3.1	29.3	32.4
2013	2.7	29.1	31.8
2012	1.7	27.6	29.3
2011	4.8	31.1	35.9
2010	2.1	27.3	29.4
2009	4.8	23.3	28.1
2008	2.7	31.3	34
2007	3.4	26.5	29.9
2006	1	24.4	25.4
2005	1.4	31.6	33
2004	1.6	22.2	23.8
2003	2.5	11.8	14.3
2002	1.3	14.2	15.5

=== Israel - Jordan Trade ===
Israel - Jordan trade in millions USD-$
	Israel imports Jordan exports	Jordan imports Israel exports	Total trade value
2023	371.9	76.2	448.1
2022	469	67.6	536.6
2021	391.5	64.2	455.7
2020	210	39.4	249.4
2019	285.5	99.2	384.7
2018	346	71.5	417.5
2017	282.1	57.7	339.8
2016	308.1	48.9	357
2015	410.5	98.7	509.2
2014	378.1	107.8	485.9
2013	266.5	98.5	365
2012	205.5	154	359.5
2011	172.9	210	382.9
2010	94.1	185.6	279.7
2009	70	231.3	301.3
2008	105.9	288.5	394.4
2007	54.4	250.7	305.1
2006	38.2	136.6	174.8
2005	60.9	116.2	177.1
2004	51.4	132.9	184.3
2003	44.4	86.8	131.2
2002	47.9	69.1	117

=== Israel - Mercosur Trade ===
Israel - Mercosur trade in millions USD-$
	Israel imports Mercosur exports	Mercosur imports Israel exports	Total trade value
2023	744.6	1595.4	2340
2022	1005.2	2166.7	3171.9
2021	841.3	1418.9	2260.2
2020	667.4	1156.4	1823.8
2019	685.5	1335.7	2021.2
2018	551.9	1346.9	1898.8
2017	594.2	1071.9	1666.1
2016	661.8	877.5	1539.3
2015	552.9	881.9	1434.8
2014	570.6	1049.7	1620.3
2013	673.2	1188.9	1862.1
2012	634.4	1289.5	1923.9
2011	624.9	1050.4	1675.3
2010	550.1	1078.6	1628.7
2009	427.4	807	1234.4
2008	547.9	1334.7	1882.6
2007	516.5	816.9	1333.4
2006	433.7	561.6	995.3
2005	370.5	554.6	925.1
2004	386	553.9	939.9
2003	248.8	403.8	652.6
2002	230.6	346.6	577.2

==== Trade with Mercosur member countries ====
===== Argentina =====
Israel - Argentina trade in millions USD-$
	Israel imports Argentina exports	Argentina imports Israel exports	Total trade value
2023	264.4	166.2	430.6
2022	256.9	180	436.9
2021	189.1	137.1	326.2
2020	204.3	122.6	326.9
2019	190.3	137.8	328.1
2018	139.8	155.5	295.3
2017	135.4	140.1	275.5
2016	139.3	108	247.3
2015	147	111.9	258.9
2014	137.1	105.6	242.7
2013	187.1	121.6	308.7
2012	188.8	127.5	316.3
2011	215.5	134	349.5
2010	176.7	131	307.7
2009	147	75.9	222.9
2008	150.3	125.2	275.5
2007	154.5	126.2	280.7
2006	134.3	81.5	215.8
2005	136.7	71	207.7
2004	135.7	55.2	190.9
2003	75.2	31.1	106.3
2002	47.5	15.3	62.8

===== Brazil =====
Israel - Brazil trade in millions USD-$
	Israel imports Brazil exports	Brazil imports Israel exports	Total trade value
2023	271	1365.4	1636.4
2022	397.7	1942	2339.7
2021	297.2	1259.7	1556.9
2020	219.6	1006.7	1226.3
2019	235.3	1180.1	1415.4
2018	187.4	1169.1	1356.5
2017	215.3	905.4	1120.7
2016	253.5	747.3	1000.8
2015	167.4	737.6	905
2014	180.9	922.1	1103
2013	206.9	1041.9	1248.8
2012	190.8	1130.9	1321.7
2011	230.1	892.6	1122.7
2010	258.8	934.8	1193.6
2009	207.8	716.5	924.3
2008	297.2	1172	1469.2
2007	270.7	671.6	942.3
2006	209.4	465.7	675.1
2005	166.5	467.3	633.8
2004	207	488	695
2003	127.8	364.1	491.9
2002	117.2	322.3	439.5

===== Paraguay =====
Israel - Paraguay trade in millions USD-$
	Israel imports Paraguay exports	Paraguay imports Israel exports	Total trade value
2023	66	3.6	69.6
2022	128.3	8.5	136.8
2021	134.4	8.8	143.2
2020	104.5	13.8	118.3
2019	144.6	7.9	152.5
2018	66.6	8.1	74.7
2017	79.4	7.8	87.2
2016	104	4.9	108.9
2015	93	5.2	98.2
2014	92.1	5.9	98
2013	111.5	6.4	117.9
2012	22.9	8	30.9
2011	53.6	8.5	62.1
2010	56.8	3.1	59.9
2009	22.6	5	27.6
2008	20.1	18.2	38.3
2007	22.7	10.8	33.5
2006	19.1	6.9	26
2005	17.6	4	21.6
2004	13.1	3.3	16.4
2003	0.7	1.2	1.9
2002	1.1	1.4	2.5

===== Uruguay =====
Israel - Uruguay trade in millions USD-$
	Israel imports Uruguay exports	Uruguay imports Israel exports	Total trade value
2023	143.2	60.2	203.4
2022	222.3	36.2	258.5
2021	220.6	13.3	233.9
2020	139	13.3	152.3
2019	115.3	9.9	125.2
2018	158.1	14.2	172.3
2017	164.1	18.6	182.7
2016	165	17.3	182.3
2015	145.5	27.2	172.7
2014	160.5	16.1	176.6
2013	167.7	19	186.7
2012	231.9	23.1	255
2011	125.7	15.3	141
2010	57.8	9.7	67.5
2009	50	9.6	59.6
2008	80.3	19.3	99.6
2007	68.6	8.3	76.9
2006	70.9	7.5	78.4
2005	49.7	12.3	62
2004	30.2	7.4	37.6
2003	45.1	7.4	52.5
2002	64.8	7.6	72.4

=== Israel - Mexico Trade ===
Israel - Mexico trade in millions USD-$
	Israel imports Mexico exports	Mexico imports Israel exports	Total trade value
2023	104.8	417.9	522.7
2022	109.9	510.1	620
2021	106.6	385.1	491.7
2020	74.6	322.7	397.3
2019	95.8	351.8	447.6
2018	124.4	362.3	486.7
2017	194.2	365.6	559.8
2016	168.7	380.7	549.4
2015	111.5	434.2	545.7
2014	151.4	464.3	615.7
2013	140.9	359.9	500.8
2012	149.5	452.3	601.8
2011	179.1	365.4	544.5
2010	178.5	313.9	492.4
2009	117.8	271.7	389.5
2008	115.8	329.3	445.1
2007	57.9	289.8	347.7
2006	33.1	284.5	317.6
2005	21.5	214.1	235.6
2004	21.2	342.5	363.7
2003	17.6	228.7	246.3
2002	20.2	191.6	211.8

=== Israel - Panama Trade ===
Israel - Panama trade in millions USD-$
	Israel imports Panama exports	Panama imports Israel exports	Total trade value
2023	40.2	12.6	52.8
2022	34.8	12.1	46.9
2021	106.9	9	115.9
2020	17.6	7.2	24.8
2019	23.4	9.3	32.7
2018	19.5	17.4	36.9
2017	22.9	11.5	34.4
2016	47.5	14.2	61.7
2015	43.7	40.8	84.5
2014	44.3	25.7	70
2013	42.9	16.1	59
2012	34.2	17.2	51.4
2011	33.5	20.6	54.1
2010	20.5	17.9	38.4
2009	14.3	18.9	33.2
2008	32.6	17	49.6
2007	9.8	18.1	27.9
2006	15.3	11	26.3
2005	7.2	10.2	17.4
2004	8.1	8.3	16.4
2003	10.5	9.5	20
2002	3.6	14.5	18.1

=== Israel - South Korea Trade ===
Israel - South Korea trade in millions USD-$
	Israel imports South Korea exports	South Korea imports Israel exports	Total trade value
2023	2511.4	1085.7	3597.1
2022	2796.6	1304.2	4100.8
2021	2251.7	1153.7	3405.4
2020	1692.7	787.7	2480.4
2019	1624.6	706.4	2331
2018	1515.5	970.1	2485.6
2017	1141.9	886.3	2028.2
2016	1316.3	580	1896.3
2015	1138.2	575.2	1713.4
2014	1357.2	627.8	1985
2013	1513	594	2107
2012	1663	700.7	2363.7
2011	1607.7	724.1	2331.8
2010	1100.7	850.3	1951
2009	871.1	841	1712.1
2008	1103.2	818.5	1921.7
2007	945.4	746.1	1691.5
2006	893.6	650	1543.6
2005	852.7	449.8	1302.5
2004	759.9	417.7	1177.6
2003	579.8	286.9	866.7
2002	512.4	317.2	829.6

=== Israel - Turkey Trade ===
Israel - Turkey trade in millions USD-$
	Israel imports Turkey exports	Turkey imports Israel exports	Total trade value
2023	4607.6	1565.2	6172.8
2022	5700.3	2338.9	8039.2
2021	4764.3	1919.1	6683.4
2020	3497.7	1430.8	4928.5
2019	3207.8	1757.6	4965.4
2018	2885.5	1912.4	4797.9
2017	2895.9	1428.1	4324
2016	2601.7	1297.7	3899.4
2015	2446	1701.1	4147.1
2014	2683.6	2755.6	5439.2
2013	2354.1	2515.6	4869.7
2012	2082.7	1421.4	3504.1
2011	2171.1	1855.7	4026.8
2010	1800.1	1310.7	3110.8
2009	1387.7	1086	2473.7
2008	1825.3	1609.9	3435.2
2007	1606.9	1195.8	2802.7
2006	1272.7	821.2	2093.9
2005	1221.1	903.2	2124.3
2004	1166.9	813.5	1980.4
2003	951.5	470.3	1421.8
2002	813.7	383.1	1196.8

=== Israel - Ukraine Trade ===
Israel - Ukraine trade in millions USD-$
	Israel imports Ukraine exports	Ukraine imports Israel exports	Total trade value
2023	104.5	58.1	162.6
2022	129.3	78.4	207.7
2021	184.4	199	383.4
2020	153.3	134.7	288
2019	123.2	162.1	285.3
2018	106.6	166.9	273.5
2017	114.5	129.9	244.4
2016	107.8	160.9	268.7
2015	111.6	154.9	266.5
2014	108.6	298.8	407.4
2013	176.6	356.7	533.3
2012	214	294.3	508.3
2011	196.3	145.4	341.7
2010	139	111.1	250.1
2009	103.9	88.1	192
2008	201.5	195.1	396.6
2007	154.8	161.9	316.7
2006	170.5	128.3	298.8
2005	156.8	108.1	264.9
2004	172.4	97.4	269.8
2003	138.8	74.7	213.5
2002	110.3	69.7	180

=== Israel - United Arab Emirates Trade ===
Israel - UAE trade in millions USD-$
	Israel imports United Arab Emirates exports	United Arab Emirates imports Israel exports	Total trade value
2023	2316.3	630.4	2946.7
2022	1890.9	637.3	2528.2
2021	836.9	384.5	1221.4
2020	115.8	74	189.8

=== Israel - United Kingdom Trade ===
Israel - United Kingdom trade in millions USD-$
	Israel imports United Kingdom exports	United Kingdom imports Israel exports	Total trade value
2023	2908.5	2125.8	5034.3
2022	3186.8	3121.2	6308
2021	2990.2	2057.5	5047.7
2020	2973.8	3712.7	6686.5
2019	3027.1	4992.4	8019.5
2018	6151.4	4341.2	10492.6
2017	4305	5168.2	9473.2
2016	3667.9	3909.1	7577
2015	2272.4	3992.4	6264.8
2014	2333.6	3974.8	6308.4
2013	2420.9	3853.5	6274.4
2012	2598.1	3568.7	6166.8
2011	2776.7	3424.7	6201.4
2010	2246.4	2268.1	4514.5
2009	1907.2	1423.5	3330.7
2008	2519.9	1892.7	4412.6
2007	2681.4	1938.1	4619.5
2006	2458.6	1601.7	4060.3
2005	2552.1	1649.9	4202
2004	2482.8	1447.8	3930.6
2003	2283.4	1224.5	3507.9
2002	2226.8	1164.5	3391.3

=== Israel – United States Trade ===
Israel - USA trade in millions USD-$
	Israel imports United States exports	United States imports Israel exports	Total trade value
2023	9058.9	17583.2	26642.1
2022	9639	18616.8	28255.8
2021	8630.8	16318.9	24949.7
2020	8327.1	13132.3	21459.4
2019	11744.9	15964.2	27709.1
2018	9755.1	16696	26451.1
2017	8084.8	17046.1	25130.9
2016	8076.3	17589	25665.3
2015	8080.6	18116.3	26196.9
2014	8560.1	18567.7	27127.8
2013	8153.2	17500.8	25654
2012	9398.7	17518.2	26916.9
2011	8706.7	19432.4	28139.1
2010	6701	18488.2	25189.2
2009	5849.1	16774.1	22623.2
2008	8034.4	19972.5	28006.9
2007	7848.9	18906.8	26755.7
2006	5919.5	17957.2	23876.7
2005	6042.1	15500.1	21542.2
2004	6099.1	14175.1	20274.2
2003	5330.8	12088.5	17419.3
2002	6134.1	11712.2	17846.3

=== Israel - Vietnam Trade ===
Israel - Vietnam trade in millions USD-$
	Israel imports Vietnam exports	Vietnam imports Israel exports	Total trade value
2023	220.9	171.5	392.4
2022	278.2	175	453.2
2021	337.5	158.9	496.4
2020	386.9	159.3	546.2
2019	646.3	117.2	763.5
2018	612.4	135.3	747.7
2017	598.8	104.7	703.5
2016	442.3	1199.8	1642.1
2015	408.9	1789.2	2198.1
2014	380.1	669	1049.1
2013	294.1	678.1	972.2
2012	208.3	721	929.3
2011	129.8	340.8	470.6
2010	84.6	124.8	209.4
2009	71.5	117.6	189.1
2008	140	79.4	219.4
2007	64.2	70.9	135.1
2006	45.3	40.5	85.8
2005	37.2	35.5	72.7
2004	33.4	28.9	62.3
2003	23.5	18	41.5
2002	19.5	10.7	30.2

== See also ==
- Economy of Israel
- Foreign relations of Israel
- Free trade area
- List of bilateral free trade agreements
- European Union Association Agreement
- Euro-Mediterranean free trade area
- Union for the Mediterranean
- Protocol on Economic Relations
- Israel Export Institute
