= Isaac Accords =

Diplomatic initiative between Israel and Latin America

The Isaac Accords (Hebrew: הסכמי יצחק; Spanish: Acuerdos de Isaac) is a diplomatic, economic, and cultural initiative aimed at strengthening cooperation between Israel and Latin American countries. The name alludes to the Abraham Accords, the 2020 agreements that normalized relations between Israel and several Arab states. It was first announced in June 2025 by Argentina's Ambassador to Israel Rabbi Shimon Axel Wahnish, who previously served as personal rabbi to Argentina's President Javier Milei.

The announcement followed the awarding of the 2025 Genesis Prize to President Javier Milei. Additional details about the Isaac Accords were announced following the award ceremony where Milei received the Genesis Prize, an award that is sometimes also called the "Jewish Nobel".

The accords were officially launched on 19 April 2026 in Jerusalem, during Javier Milei's visit to Israel. The initiative aims to bring together countries rooted in the Judeo-Christian tradition, strengthening ties between Israel and the Western Hemisphere in defense of freedom and democracy, and in the fight against terrorism, antisemitism, and drug trafficking, while also cooperating in innovation, technology, trade, and economic openness. Members of the accords also pledged to counter Iran's influence across the region.

== Organization ==
To help implement the Isaac Accords, the Genesis Prize Foundation (GPF) established a nonprofit organization, American Friends of Isaac Accords (AFOIA), based in New York City. GPF provided seed funding of $1 million. This was the monetary component of the $1 million Genesis Prize awarded to Milei, which he declined to accept and asked that GPF donate the funds to this initiative.

== See also ==
- Abraham Accords
- American Friends of Isaac Accords (AFOIA)
