= Leah Soibel =

American executive (born 1977)

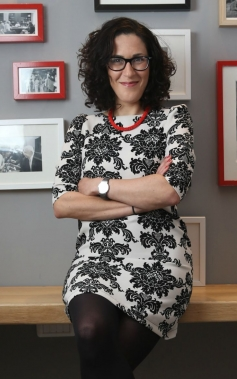
- Born: 1977 (age 48–49); St. Louis, Missouri, US

Leah Soibel (born 1977 in St. Louis, Missouri) is the founder and executive director of Fuente Latina, a non-profit organization headquartered in Miami, which aims to provide pro-Israel information to Spanish-language news outlets. Soibel was born in the United States to Argentinean parents, and is a Middle East expert who provides Spanish-language commentary to Hispanic media regarding the Middle East.

She has written for Hispanic media outlets such as Infobae, el Nuevo Herald, Univisión, La Opinión de Los Ángeles and El Diario de Nueva York, among others.
