= S. Fitzgerald Haney =

American diplomat and businessman

'Fitz' Haney
- S. Fitzgerald Haney
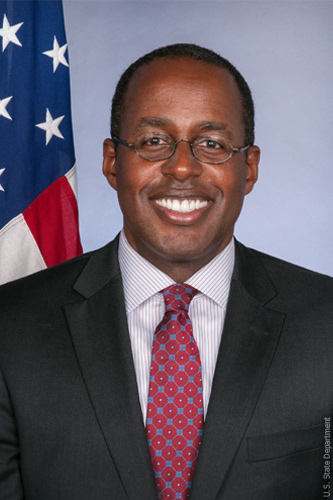

U.S. Ambassador to Costa Rica
- In office July 8, 2015 – July 15, 2017
- President: Barack Obama; Donald Trump
- Preceded by: Anne Slaughter Andrew
- Succeeded by: Sharon Day

Personal details
- Born: Stafford Fitzgerald Haney; January 3, 1969 (age 57) Nashville, Tennessee
- Spouse: Andrea Dobrick
- Children: 4
- Education: Georgetown University
- Occupation: Diplomat, businessman
- Awards: Grand Silver Cross of the National Order of Juan Mora Fernández

Stafford Fitzgerald Haney (born January 3, 1969) is an American diplomat and businessman who served as the U.S. ambassador to the Republic of Costa Rica from 2015 to 2017. Haney was nominated as U.S. ambassador to Costa Rica by President Barack Obama on July 8, 2014, and was confirmed by the full Senate on May 23, 2015. He served until July 15, 2017, having been the only Obama-appointed political ambassador in the world allowed to stay under the Donald Trump administration.

Born in Nashville, Tennessee, Haney grew up in Naperville, Illinois, and graduated from Georgetown University, earning a B.S. in international economics and an M.S. in international business and diplomacy from Georgetown University's School of Foreign Service, Washington, D.C., 1986–1991.

== Early years ==
Haney was born in Nashville, Tennessee. In 1986, he graduated from Naperville Central High School.

Haney received his B.S. in international economics in 1990 and his M.S. in international business diplomacy in 1991, both from Georgetown University.

After graduating, Haney moved to Latin America to work for a number of U.S. multinationals in Puerto Rico, Mexico, Central America, and Brazil. After nearly a decade in Latin America, he moved to Israel, where he met his future wife, Rabbi Andrea Haney. The couple moved back to the United States in 2002 and settled in Englewood, New Jersey.

== Latin America and strategic marketing ==
Haney started his professional life working for Procter & Gamble in San Juan, Puerto Rico in what was then called the brand management (marketing) department. Haney spent three years at P&G Puerto Rico working in the laundry and food & beverage sectors. He left P&G in 1994 as an assistant brand manager.

In 1994, Haney moved to PepsiCo Restaurants International, where he worked as a marketing manager for Puerto Rico. In 1995, the company moved him to Mexico City to become the marketing manager for Mexico and Central America. During his time in Mexico, Haney was part of the team which developed a new line of lower cost pizzas, Pizza Mia, in response to the currency and economic crisis. The line has since been launched globally.

In 1996, Pepsico Restaurants promoted Haney to be marketing director for Brazil. He was responsible for marketing and strategy for the entire PepsiCo Restaurants business in the country covering both brands, Pizza Hut and KFC, as well as franchise relations. Haney relaunched both brands, revamped business strategy and was successful in turning the businesses around.

In 1997, Haney became the vice president of marketing and strategic planning for Citibank Mexico in Mexico City. He was charged with developing a strategy for what was then Citibank's third largest consumer business in the world and largest in Latin America after the bank's acquisition of Banco Confia. Haney managed 192 people and a marketing budget of US$31 million.

== Conversion to Judaism ==
Haney was raised Catholic and attended Catholic grade school. At Georgetown University, he participated in Catholic retreat programs and regularly attended mass. Upon moving to Mexico for the second time, Haney started studying Judaism one-on-one with an Orthodox rabbi. After 18 months of study, Haney decided to take a leave of absence from Citibank and move to Israel to participate in the WUJS (Worldwide Union of Jewish Students) program in Arad, Israel. Prior to moving to Israel, Haney spent time in his hometown of Chicago, where he attended the Anshe Emet Synagogue, eventually converting to Judaism under Conservative Judaism auspices.

Once in Israel, Haney continued to study Judaism, both at WUJS in Arad and at the Pardes Institute of Jewish Studies, eventually re-converting this time under Orthodox Judaism auspices.

Haney has been active in Jewish organizations and served as treasurer, secretary, and co-chair of the Foundation for Jewish Culture, board member of Ayecha (Resource Organization for Jews of Color), member of a modern orthodox synagogue, Kesher, in Englewood/Tenafly, New Jersey and was appointed by President Obama as a member of the United States Holocaust Memorial Council.

== Israel and venture capital ==
After finishing his studies at WUJS (Worldwide Union of Jewish Students), Haney moved to Jerusalem and began working as a senior associate at Israel Seed Partners, then the largest seed-stage venture capital firm in Israel. He managed deal flow and investment analysis for $240 million seed capital fund and was involved in strategy, marketing, and fund-raising activity for $200 million fourth fund. He was the lead investor in Cyota, Inc., and managed the company through subsequent rounds until it was acquired by RSA Security for $145MM, as well as having managed the investment, business development, and subsequent acquisition of location-based services portfolio company NomadIQ by Omnisky (NASDAQ:OMNY).

== New York and financial services ==
In 2002, Haney was recruited to join the Depository Trust & Clearing Corporation (DTCC) in New York City as the Director of Strategy and New Business Development.

In 2006, Haney began a stint as Senior Vice President of Ethnic Consumer Products at IDT Corporation in Newark, New Jersey.

From 2007 to 2015, he was a Principal and Director of Business Development and Client Service (Europe, Middle East and Africa) at Pzena Investment Management in New York City, London and Middle East.

== Ambassadorship ==
On July 8, 2014, President Obama announced his intention to nominate Haney as U.S. ambassador to the Republic of Costa Rica. Haney presented testimony before the Senate Foreign Relations Committee on July 25, 2014, with Senator Tim Kaine presiding over the hearing. He was voted out of committee on September 18, 2014, and his nomination was forwarded to the full Senate. The Senate failed to act on the nomination and it languished to the end of the session. At the end of the session, the nomination was returned to the White House.

On February 5, 2015, President Obama once again forwarded Haney's nomination to the Senate. Haney presented testimony before the Senate Foreign Relations Committee (for the second time) on March 10, 2015. On May 23, 2015, Haney was confirmed by the full Senate via voice vote, becoming one of only a few nominees confirmed by the Senate.

Haney was sworn in as U.S. ambassador to the Republic of Costa Rica on June 1, 2015. and had an official ceremony at the State Department on June 25, 2015. He arrived in San Jose, Costa Rica on June 28, 2015, and presented his credentials to Foreign Minister Manuel Gonzalez on June 30, 2015, and to President Luis Guillermo Solis on July 8, 2015.

In January 2017, it was announced that the new Trump administration would require all ambassadors politically appointed by outgoing president Barack Obama to vacate their posts upon President Trump's inauguration on January 20, 2017. On January 18, 2017, it was announced that Haney had received approval to remain at his post in San Jose, thereby becoming the only politically appointed ambassadorial holdover from the Obama to the Trump administrations.

On July 13, 2017, Haney was awarded the Grand Silver Cross of the National Order of Juan Mora Fernández by the Government of the Republic of Costa Rica for his meritorious service to the country during his time as US ambassador.

Haney ended his service as ambassador on July 15, 2017.

== Dancing with the Stars in Costa Rica ==
On July 28, 2017, it was announced that Haney would be one of the contestants on the fourth season of Dancing with the Stars in Costa Rica (DWTS-CR). DWTS-CR is consistently ranked as the number one non-sports or news related show on Costa Rican television. Haney, known as "Mr. Fitz" on the show, was paired with Lucia Jimenez, winner of the third season of DWTS-CR (2016) and a global salsa champion. Haney made it to the show's finale, coming in second place with nearly 30% of the public vote. The fourth season of DWTS broke records as to number of votes cast with more than a million votes cast for the finale.

== Viola ==
On November 27, 2017, Haney joined Viola, an Israeli technology-focused investment group with assets under management approaching $3B USD, as a Partner and Head of Strategic Development.

== Genesis Prize Foundation ==
Haney currently serves as Managing Director of Latin America for the Genesis Prize Foundation and operational head of American Friends of Isaac Accords.

== Personal life ==
In July 2000, Haney married Andrea Dobrick, who was in 2000 ordained a Conservative Rabbi by the Ziegler School of Rabbinic Studies at the American Jewish University (University of Judaism). The couple has four children.
