= Fuente Latina =

News agency

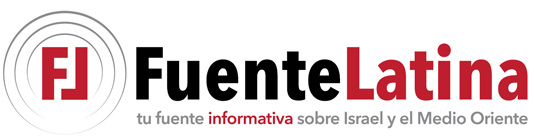
- Formation: 2012; 14 years ago
- Type: Non-profit
- Headquarters: Miami, Florida, US
- Fields: News and commentary
- Leader: Leah Soibel
- Website: fuentelatina.org

Fuente Latina is an organization founded in 2012 by Leah Soibel, providing news and commentary on the Middle East to Spanish-language news outlets. It is headquartered in Miami, Florida, and has offices in Madrid and Jerusalem.

Fuente Latina says it provides "accurate information, analysis and access to experts on Middle East issues, to major Spanish-language media outlets, journalists and government officials in the US, Spain and Latin America." According to Jewish Insider, its goal is "to bring pro-Israel information to Spanish-language media".
