= Shimon Axel Wahnish =

Argentinean rabbi and diplomat

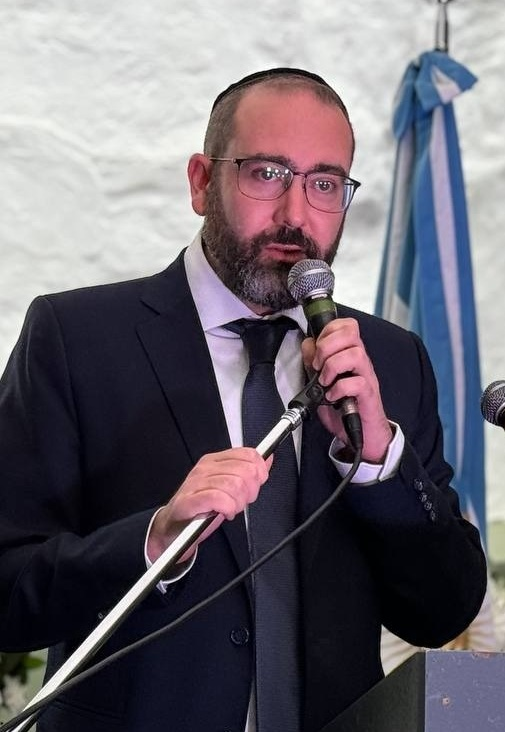

Ambassador of Argentina to Israel
- Incumbent
- Assumed office May 13, 2024
- President: Javier Milei
- Preceded by: Sergio Urribarri

Personal details
- Born: Axel Wahnish Buenos Aires, Argentina
- Children: 6

Shimon Axel Wahnish is an Argentinean Orthodox rabbi and diplomat. Since 2024, he has been Argentina's ambassador to Israel. For the major role that Wahnish played in fostering Argentinean President Javier Milei's growing affinity and interest in Judaism, Wahnish has been called Milei's rabbi and spiritual advisor, even though Milei is not Jewish.

== Early life ==
Wahnish was born into a non-religious Moroccan Jewish family in Buenos Aires. On a trip to Israel when he was 18, he discovered his passion for Judaism and became more religious as a young adult, according to Mishpacha. After high school, Wahnish studied in yeshivas in Israel before returning to Argentina and obtaining a degree in education.

In 2012, Wahnish became the chief rabbi of ACILBA, the official group of Argentina's Moroccan Jewish community. Among his responsibilities was to certify Argentine applicants for Spanish and Portuguese citizenship.

== Relationship with Javier Milei ==
Through his work with ACILBA, Wahnish first encountered Javier Milei, then a National Deputy and fringe political figure in Argentina. Milei hoped to speak to ACILBA to counter the perception that he was antisemitic. An initial 15-minute pro forma meeting between Wahnish and Milei on June 28, 2021, turned into 2 hours. The two formed a close friendship, and Wahnish joined Milei's inner circle alongside Milei's sister Karina.

Amidst Milei's political rise, he remained close with Wahnish, attending the rabbi's classes at the Great Temple of Piedras Street and joining Washnish's family for Jewish holidays and Shabbat dinners. During his presidential campaign, Milei began infusing Jewish elements into his events, including the blowing of the shofar, and he hinted at a desire to convert to Judaism. During Milei's inaugural ceremonies, he held an interfaith service in December 2023 at the Buenos Aires Metropolitan Cathedral to include Wahnish.

Wahnish accompanied Milei on his first official visit as president, a three-day trip to Israel in February 2024.

== Diplomatic career ==
Milei nominated Wahnish to be Argentina's ambassador to Israel on December 11, 2023.

During his confirmation in the Argentine Senate, Wahnish faced accusations of dual loyalty from National Senator Lucía Corpacci, whose comments were condemned by the Delegación de Asociaciones Israelitas Argentinas (DAIA). On March 27, Argentine Foreign Minister Diana Mondino convinced National Senator Martín Lousteau to sign off on Wahnish's confirmation after Mondino assured the lawmaker that Milei's pledge to move the Argentine embassy to Jerusalem would not threaten Argentina's claim to the Falkland Islands, moving Wahnish's nomination forward. Wahnish's nomination unanimously passed the Senate on April 18, 2024.

Upon his confirmation, Wahnish became the first rabbi to serve as an ambassador to Israel. The role of Argentine ambassador to Israel had been vacant since April 2022 since Sergio Urribarri was convicted of corruption and resigned from the position.

In June 2025, Wahnish became the first person to announce the Isaac Accords, which is a diplomatic, economic, and cultural initiative aimed at strengthening cooperation between Israel and Latin American countries. The Isaac Accords were officialized during Javier Milei state visit to Israel in April 2026.

== Personal life ==
Wahnish is married with six children. His brother Hernan is also a rabbi and succeeded Washnish as leader of ACILBA. Wahnish is fluent in Hebrew.
