= 2025 Genesis Prize =

The 2025 Genesis Prize was awarded to Argentinian President Javier Milei, for his support of Israel. Milei was the first South American, first head of state and first non-Jewish winner of the prize.

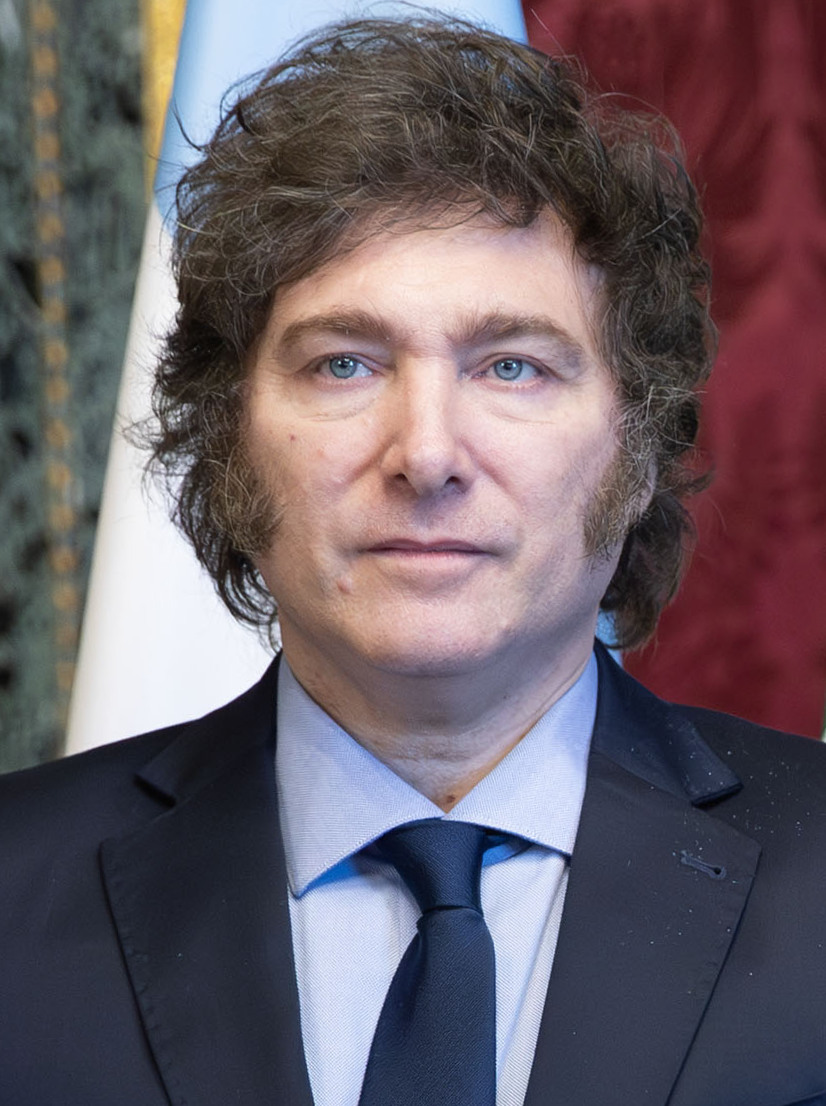
2025 Genesis Prize laureate Javier Milei

== Background ==
While many countries and world leaders turned their back on Israel in the months and years following the October 7 attacks on the Jewish state, President Milei was steadfast in his support of Israel. Milei announced he will move the Argentinian embassy to Jerusalem, supported Israel at the United Nations and also pledged to bring justice for bombings of Israeli and Jewish sites in Argentina in the 1990s. In recognition of this, Milei was honored with the Genesis Prize.

== Ceremony ==
The ceremony was originally meant to take place at the Knesset but was moved to the Museum of Tolerance and held on June 12, 2025, hours before the Iran-Israel war. Milei managed to leave Israel just prior to the war.

== Aftermath ==
In honor of President Milei, The Genesis Prize Foundation directed the funds to American Friends of Isaac Accords, an organization that would support the Isaac Accords, a brainchild of President Milei, modeled after the Abraham Accords. The goal is to deepen ties between Israel and Latin American democracies through political, economic, and cultural cooperation.
