= Embassy of Israel, Buenos Aires =

Israeli diplomatic mission in Argentina

שגרירות ישראל בבואנוס איירס Embassy of Israel in Buenos Aires
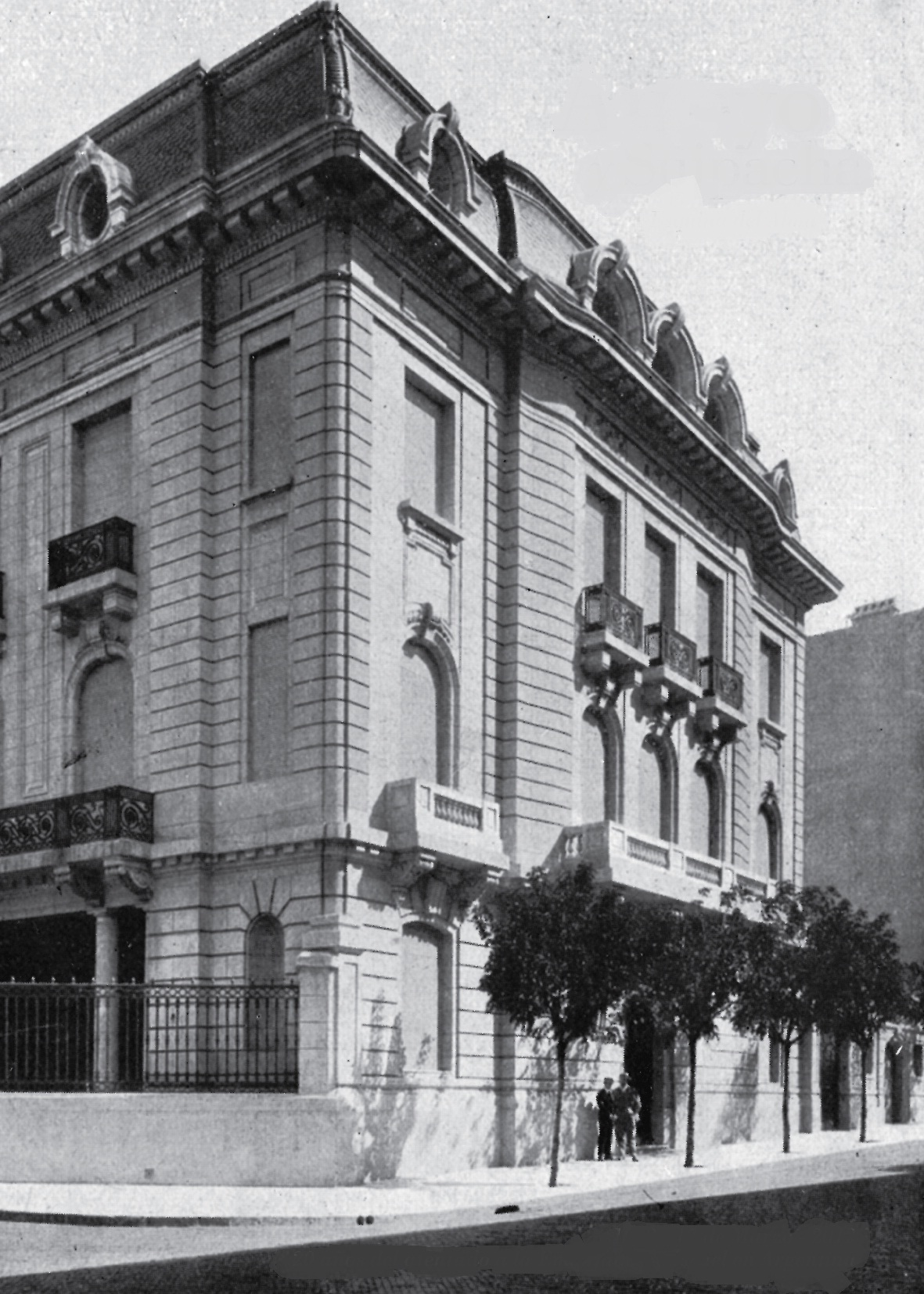
- Location: Buenos Aires, Argentina
- Address: Av. de Mayo 701, C1070 Cdad. Autónoma de Buenos Aires, Buenos Aires
- Ambassador: None

The Embassy of Israel in Buenos Aires is the diplomatic mission of Israel in Argentina. In addition to the embassy, Israel maintains two honorary consulates in Córdoba and Mendoza.

Diplomatic relations between Israel and Argentina officially began on May 31, 1949.

== 1992 attack ==
On the 17 March 1992, the embassy was attacked by a suicide bomber, resulting in the deaths of 29 civilians.
