= 2026 state visit by Javier Milei to Israel =

State visit by Javier Milei to Israel
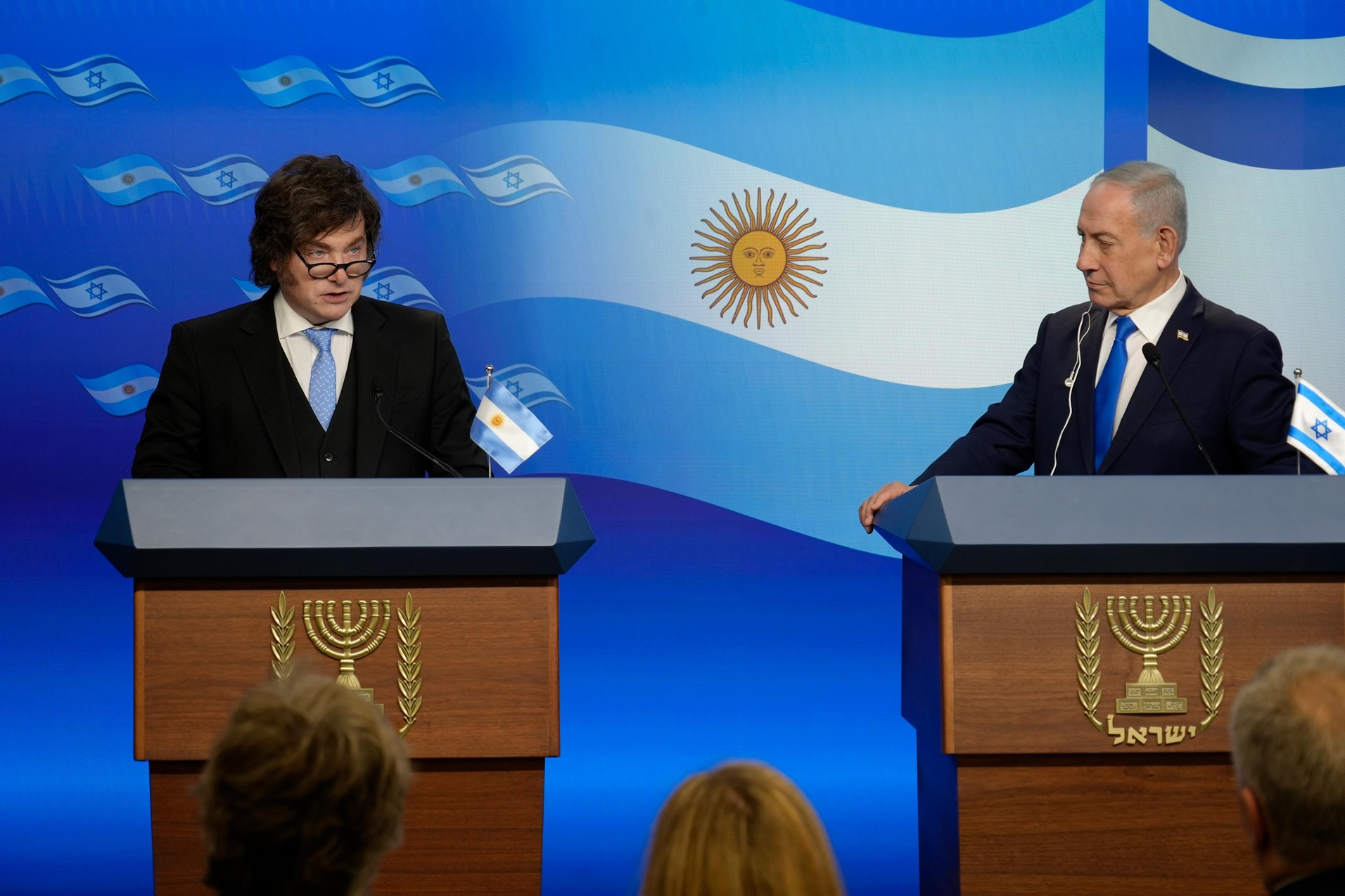
- Milei and Netanyahu, April 2026
- Date: 19 to 22 April 2026
- Location: Jerusalem Ramat Gan Tel Aviv
- Type: State visit
- Participants: President Javier Milei; Prime Minister Benjamin Netanyahu; President Isaac Herzog; Foreign Minister Pablo Quirno; Foreign Minister Gideon Sa'ar; Transport Minister Miri Regev

On 19 April 2026, President of Argentina Javier Milei arrived in Jerusalem to pay his third state visit to the State of Israel since his inauguration in December 2023. During the three-day visit, Milei met with Israeli Prime Minister Benjamin Netanyahu and President Isaac Herzog.

The trip's aim is to reinforce Argentina's alignment with Israel and its support for Israel and the United States in the Iran war.

== Background ==
During his presidential campaign in 2023, Milei put his alliance with Israel as a priority for the new focus of Argentina's foreign policy. After taking office in December 2023, Milei progressively showed total alignment with Israeli policies, including support in the Gaza war and derived military operations like the assassination of Hassan Nasrallah in Lebanon, the killing of Yahya Sinwar in Gaza, and the Nuseirat hostage rescue, which resulted in multiple Palestinian civilian casualties.

Among Milei's policies in support of Israel, his administration declared Hamas a terrorist organization in July 2024 and voted against the incorporation of Palestine into the United Nations in Resolution ES-10/23. In November 2025, Foreign Minister Pablo Quirno confirmed the Argentine government's intention to move the Argentine embassy in Israel from Tel Aviv to Jerusalem. Although the plan was postponed in January 2026 due to issues related to Israeli private business in the Falkland Islands, President Milei reactivated and reaffirmed his decision to move the embassy, assuring that it is a decision already taken.

After the outbreak of the 2026 Iran war, Milei showed complete support for the United States and Israeli airstrikes, including the assassination of Ali Khamenei, whom Milei described in strongly negative terms and accused of sponsoring terrorism and committing the AMIA bombing. The trip of April 2026 to Israel is seen as evidence of the reinforcement of Milei's support for Israel and the US administration of President Donald Trump.

== Schedule ==
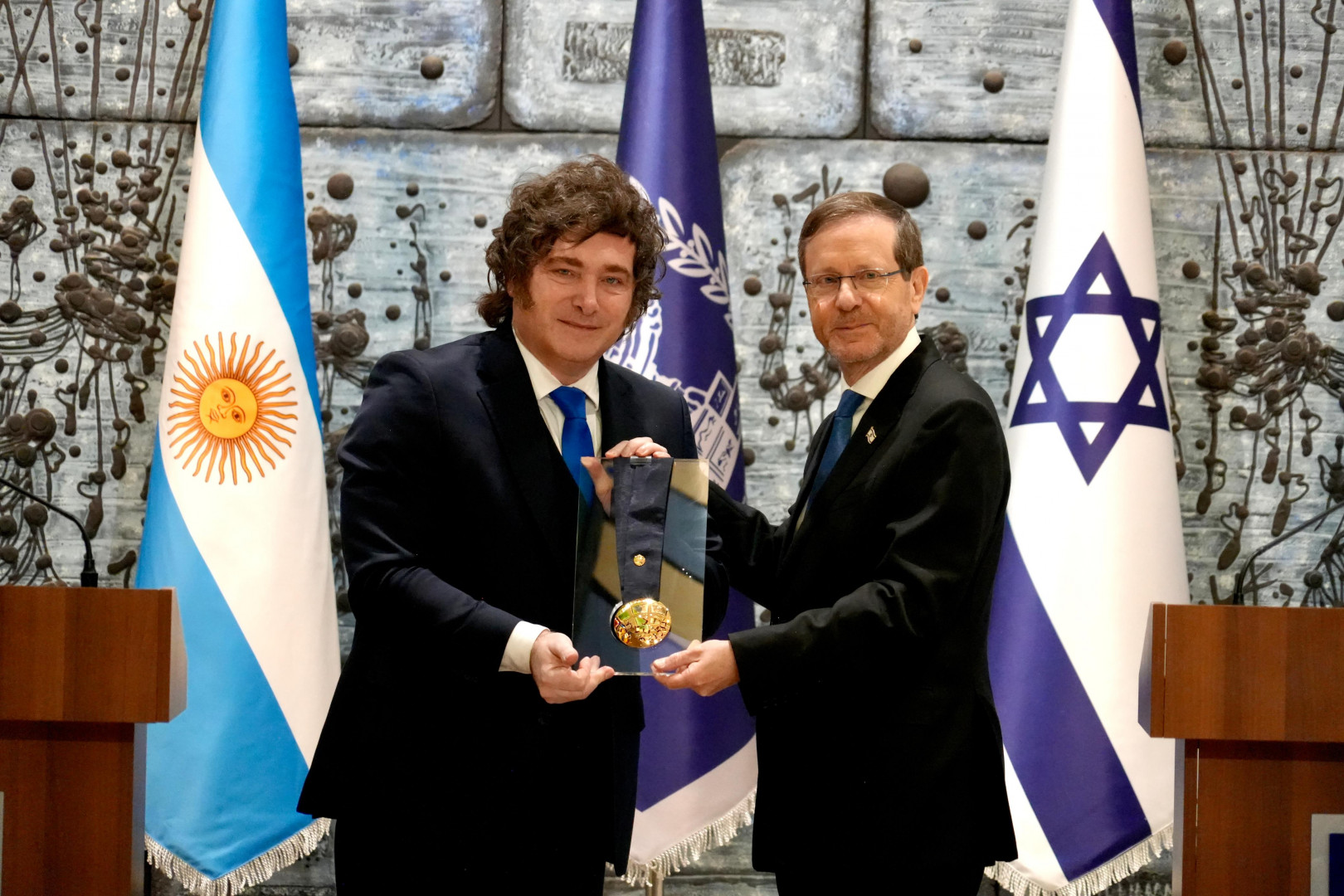
Milei receiving the Israeli Presidential Medal of Honour by President Isaac Herzog

Milei arrived in Israel on 19 April and paid a visit to the Wailing Wall in Jerusalem. Milei's schedule included a meeting with Prime Minister Benjamin Netanyahu in Jerusalem, a visit to Mount Herzl to participate in the Torch-lighting Ceremony on Israel's Independence Day, a meeting with President Isaac Herzog in Tel Aviv and a ceremony at Bar-Ilan University in Ramat Gan where he received an honoris causa. Milei became the first leader of a foreign nation to be selected to participate at the torch-lighting ceremony, where he joined in a performance of the Nino Bravo song "Libre" and told the audience before lighting a torch that "In life there are partners and there are friends. Partners come together for a moment of shared interest. Friends forge unbreakable bonds for life. I am pleased to say that Argentina and Israel are not merely partners, but friendly nations."

At the end of his trip, Milei met with rabbis and visited the Church of the Holy Sepulchre in the Old City of Jerusalem.

Milei and Netanyahu confirmed the inaugural flight of El Al directly connecting Israel and Argentina beginning in November 2026. Israeli Transport Minister Miri Regev said that she will work to keep expanding connections between both countries. Prime Minister Netanyahu expressed gratitude for Argentina's support, calling Argentina the "best partner we could have (alongside) the United States of America." The status of the Argentine embassy was also addressed by Milei during the meeting with Netanyahu, saying that Argentina will move the embassy to Jerusalem as soon as conditions are met. He confirmed to the Israeli press that the decision has been taken, arguing that Tel Aviv "may be the political capital, but Jerusalem (is) the spiritual one."

Milei and Netanyahu also announced the inauguration of the Isaac Accords to promote and foster ties between Israel and the Western Hemisphere. Foreign Minister Pablo Quirno met Israeli FM Gideon Sa'ar to advance these plans and both countries signed three memorandums of understanding to promote military and scientific cooperation between Israel and Argentina. Argentine ambassador to Israel Shimon Axel Wahnish stated that negotiations were nearly over to officialize the embassy transfer. In his speech before Bar-Ilan University, Milei said that "we cannot coexist with some cultures," referencing the war between Israel and the US against Iran, adding in his hour-long exposition that Karl Marx was "satanic" and considered Adam Smith and the Torah as "stoic" and an "antidote," respectively.

On 20 April, Milei was hosted by President Herzog, who distinguished Milei with the Israeli Presidential Medal of Honour. Milei thanked the Israeli people for the "affection" that he has received every time he has visited Israel, further adding that closer ties between Argentina and Israel will help promote Judeo-Christian values. That same day, he visited the Hebron Yeshiva in Jerusalem.
