= Israel–Panama relations =

- Israel: Panama

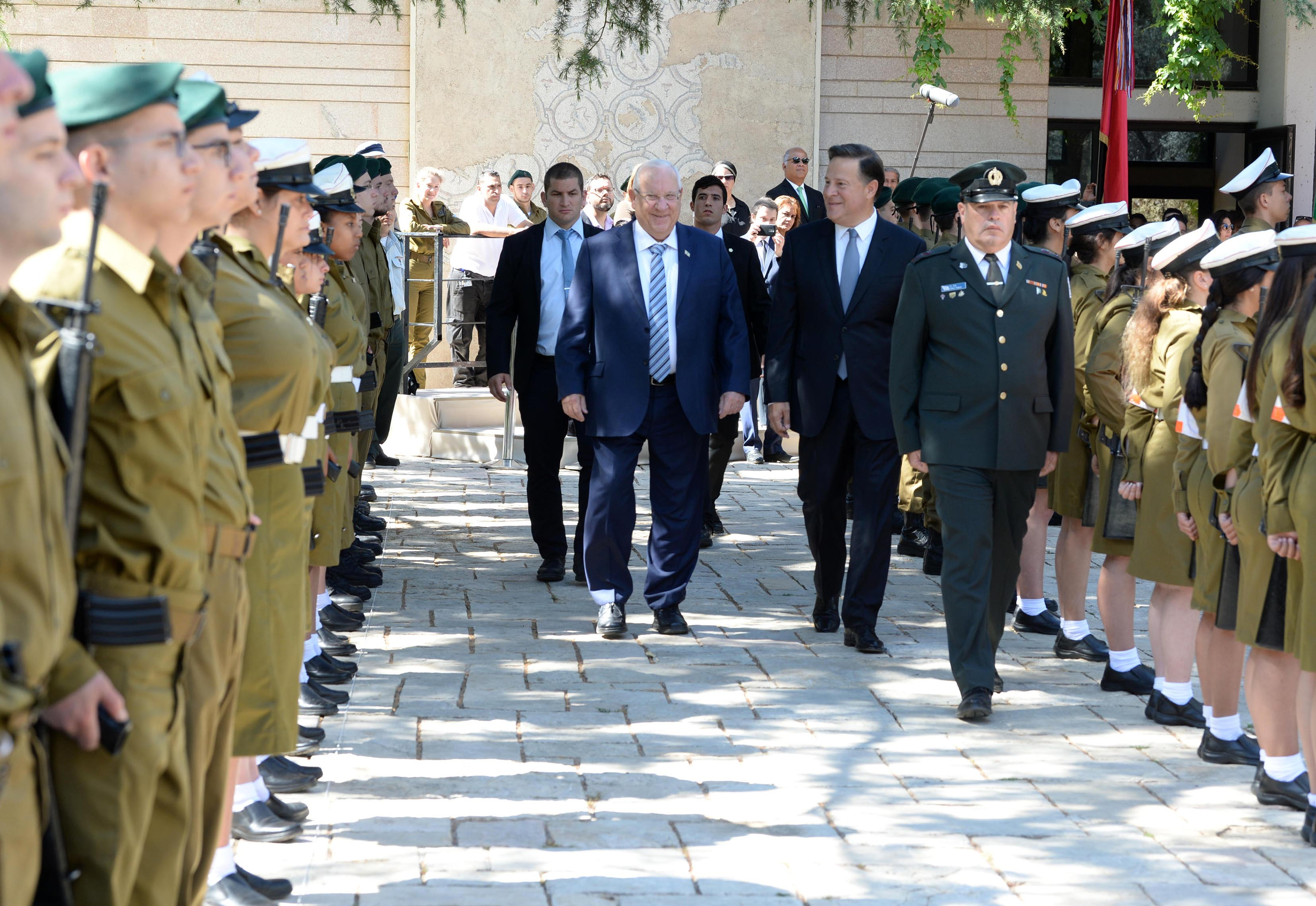
Reuven Rivlin and Juan Carlos Varela, May 2018, Israel.

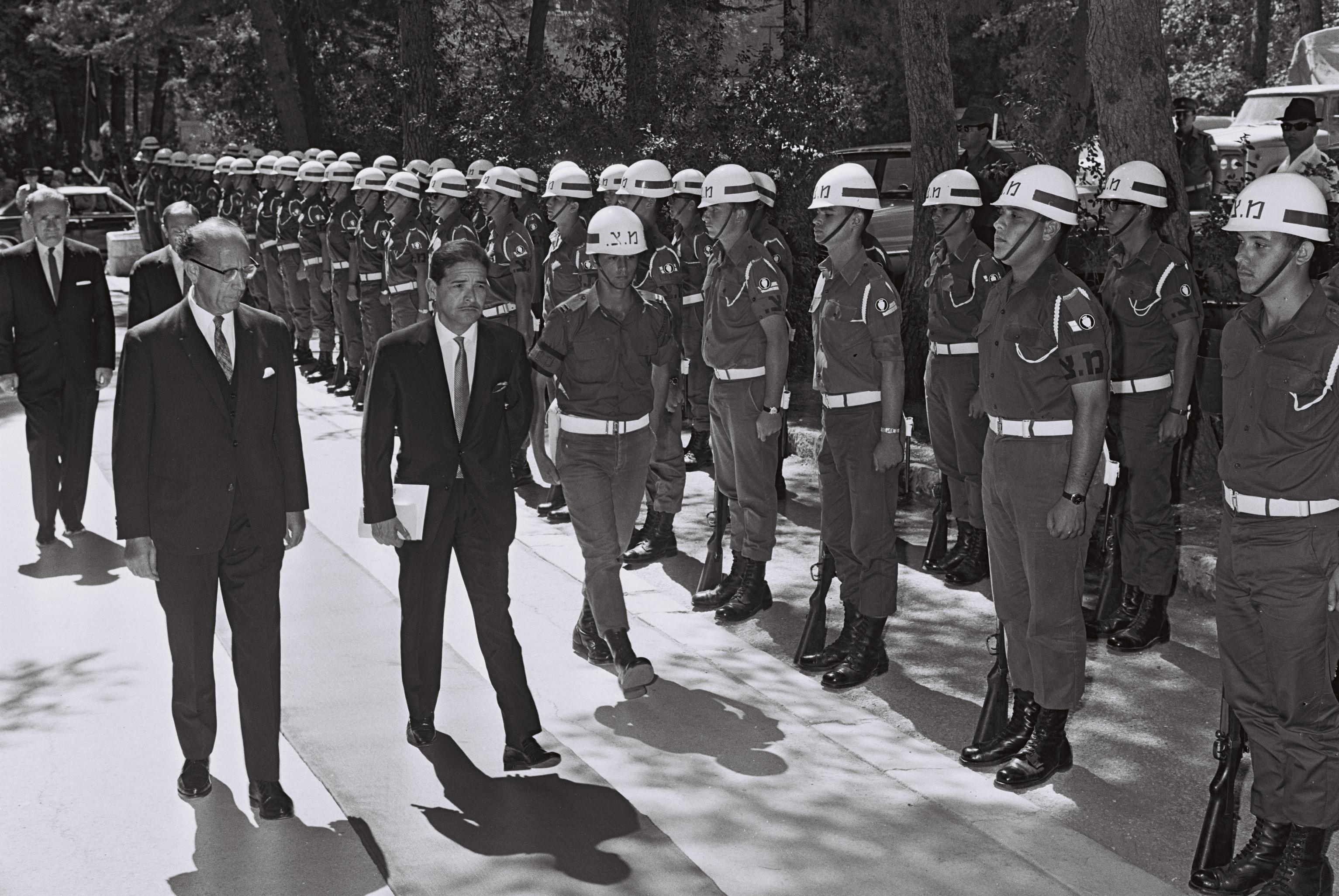
Elio V. Ortiz arriving at Beit HaNassi to present is credential to Zalman Shazar, 1967.

The State of Israel and the Republic of Panama have a cordial and friendly relationship. As of 2025, Panama is the only country in Latin America that does not recognize the State of Palestine.

Panama has an embassy in Tel Aviv, and Israel has an embassy in Panama City.

== Bilateral relations ==
Panama had voted in favor of the United Nations Partition Plan for Palestine, and was one of the first countries to recognize Israel after it declared Independence on 14 May 1948. Panama supported Israel when it asked to join the United Nations. A ship from Panama provided arms to Israel during the 1948 Arab–Israeli War.

Israel and Panama signed a cooperation agreement in the fields of culture and tourism in 1963. Until 1974 there were good relations between the countries, but after that year Panama decided to support anti-Israeli resolutions. This change in bilateral relations happened because Panama had disagreements with the USA about the Panama Canal, and the will of Panama to gain the support of the Third World countries, including the Arab world. During those years the relations between Israel and Panama were non-official, but they were still important to Israeli security.

In the neighborhood of Kiriat Menahem in Jerusalem, there is a street named after Panama and in Panama City, there is a street named after Israel.

In July 2002, Israel closed its embassy in Panama, and re-opened it in September 2004.

On 29 November 2012, Panama was one of 9 countries to oppose the United Nations General Assembly resolution 67/19 about the acceptance of the Palestinian Authority to the United Nations as a non-member observer country.

In April 2016, a delegation of doctors and paramedics from Israel visited Panama to train the local doctors. In 2018, the President of Panama, Juan Carlos Varela visited Israel.

In September 2026, Panamanian President José Raúl Mulino met Israeli Prime Minister Benjamin Netanyahu together with leaders from several Latin American countries at the United Nations General Assembly in New York.

== Security ==
On 19 July 1994, Alas Chiricanas Flight 901 exploded in Panama. 12 of the dead passengers were Jews.

In January 2017 two alleged Hezbollah activists were arrested in Panama because of the suspicion that they were planning to attack the Israeli embassy in Panama.
