= Robert Kraft =

American businessman (born 1941)

- Kraft in 2023
- Born: June 5, 1941 (age 85); Brookline, Massachusetts, U.S.
- Education: Columbia University (BA); Harvard University (MBA)
- Occupation: Businessman
- Known for: Kraft Group
- Spouses: Myra Hiatt (m. 1963; died 2011) Dana Blumberg (m. 2022)
- Children: 4 (including Daniel, Jonathan and Josh)
- Relatives: Jacob Hiatt (father-in-law)
- Football career

New England Patriots
- Title: Principal owner

Career history
- New England Patriots (1994–present) Principal owner

Awards and highlights
- 6× Super Bowl champion (XXXVI, XXXVIII, XXXIX, XLIX, LI, LIII); George Halas Award (2012); Theodore Roosevelt Award (2006); U.S. Open Cup (2007)

Robert Hearth Kenneth Kraft (born June 5, 1941) is an American businessman. He is the chairman and chief executive officer (CEO) of the Kraft Group, a diversified holding company with assets in paper and packaging, sports and entertainment, real estate development, and a private equity portfolio. Since 1994, Kraft has owned the New England Patriots of the National Football League (NFL). He also owns the New England Revolution of Major League Soccer (MLS), which he founded in 1996. In 2017, he founded the Boston Uprising, an Overwatch League esports team that competed from 2017 until it disbanded in January 2024. According to Forbes, he had an estimated net worth of $11.1 billion as of July 2024.

== Early life ==
Kraft was born in Brookline, Massachusetts, the son of Sarah Bryna (Webber) and Harry Kraft, a dress manufacturer in Boston's Chinatown. His mother was born in Halifax, Nova Scotia; his father was a lay leader at Congregation Kehillath Israel in Brookline and wanted his son to become a rabbi. The Krafts were a Modern Orthodox Jewish family. Robert attended the Edward Devotion School and graduated from Brookline High School. As a child, he sold newspapers outside Braves Field in Boston. During high school, Kraft was unable to participate in most sports because it interfered with his after-school Hebrew studies and observance of the Sabbath.

Kraft attended Columbia University on an academic scholarship and he served as class president. He played tennis and safety on the school's freshman and lightweight football teams. During that time, Kraft lived in Carman Hall. He met Myra Hiatt at a delicatessen in Boston's Back Bay in 1962, and they married in June 1963. Kraft graduated from Columbia that year, and in 1965 he received an MBA from Harvard Business School.

== Business career ==
Kraft began his professional career with the Rand-Whitney Group, a Worcester-based packaging company run by his father-in-law, Jacob Hiatt. In 1968, he gained control of the company through a leveraged buyout. Kraft remains the chairman. In 1972, he founded International Forest Products, a trader of physical paper commodities. The two companies are the largest privately held paper and packaging companies in the United States. Kraft has said he started the company out of a hunch that the increase in international communications and transportation would lead to an expansion of global trade in the late 20th century.

International Forest Products became a top 100 US exporter/importer in 1997 and in 2001 was ranked 7th on the Journal of Commerce's list in that category. In 1991, Kraft said of the business, "We do things for a number of companies, including Avon, Kodak, cosmetics companies, candies, toys." The company produced both corrugated and folding cartons, which he said were "used to package everything from the Patriot missile, to mints, to Estee Lauder, Indiana Glass, and Polaroid." Kraft acquired interests in other areas, and ultimately formed the Kraft Group as an umbrella for them in 1998.

Kraft was an investor in New England Television Corp., which gained control of the channel 7 license for Boston in 1982, and he became a director of the board in 1983, after the newly licensed station, WNEV-TV, signed on, replacing the former WNAC-TV. In 1986, Kraft was named president of the corporation. In 1991, he exercised his option to sell his shares for an estimated $25 million.

== Sports ownership ==
=== Boston Lobsters ===
In 1974, Kraft, Harold Bayne, Herbert Hoffman, Bob Mades, and Paul Slater purchased the Boston Lobsters of World TeamTennis (WTT). The group spent heavily to lure a number of top players, including Martina Navratilova, and the Lobsters became one of the best teams in WTT. After the 1978 season, Kraft announced that the franchise would fold. The league itself folded soon thereafter.

After the Lobsters folded, Kraft was also mentioned as a bidder for the Boston Red Sox and the Boston Celtics.

=== New England Patriots ===
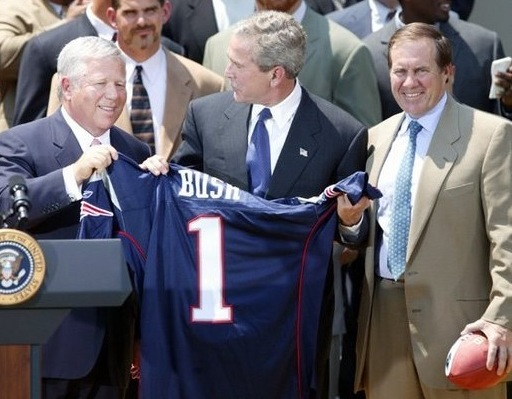
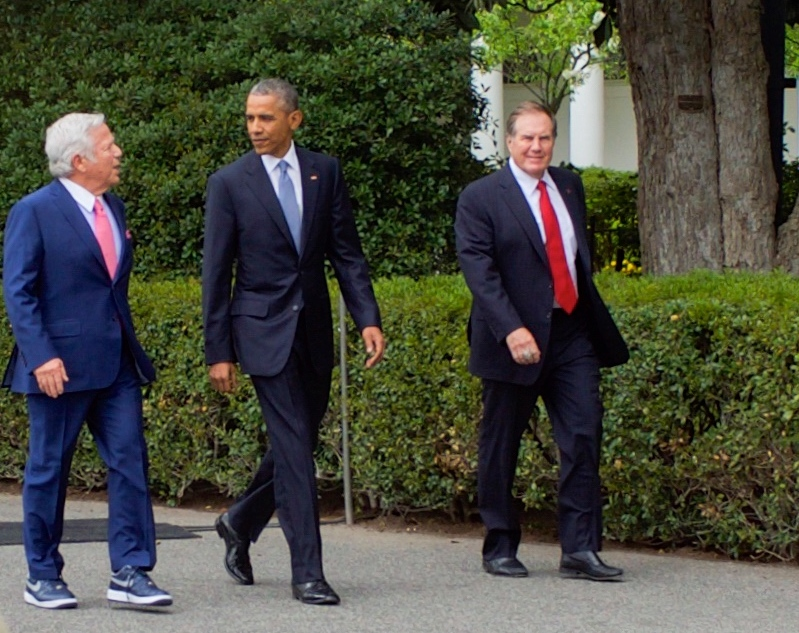

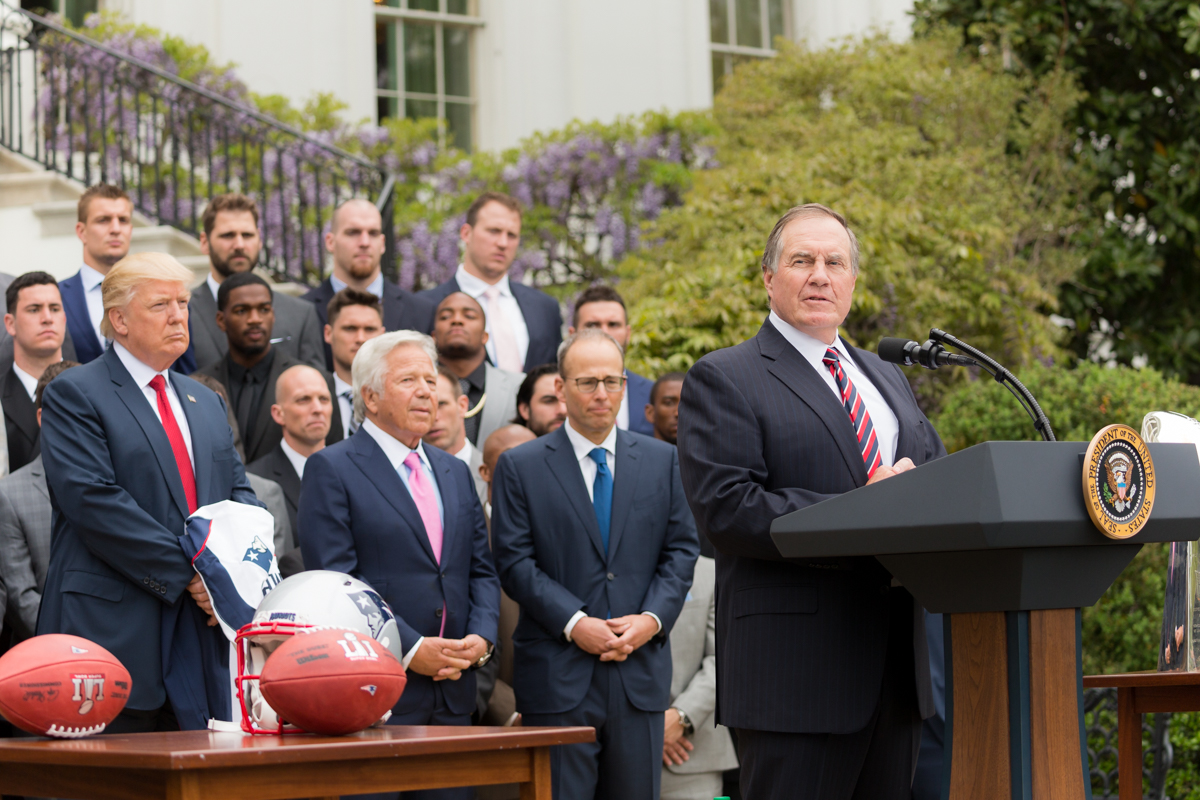
Kraft and Bill Belichick with Presidents Bush (May 2004), Obama (April 2015), and Trump (April 2017) at the Patriots' White House ceremonies

Kraft has been a New England Patriots fan since their American Football League days and had been a season ticket holder since 1971, when the team moved to Schaefer Stadium. In 1985, he bought a 10-year option on Foxboro Raceway, a horse track adjacent to the stadium, and the purchase prevented Patriots owner Billy Sullivan from holding non-Patriot events at the stadium while races were being held. Kraft took advantage of the fact that the Sullivans owned the stadium but not the surrounding land; it was the beginning of a quest to buy the stadium and the Patriots. Sullivan's family was reeling from a series of bad investments, principally The Jackson Five 1984 Victory Tour, for which they had to pledge Sullivan Stadium as collateral. Those problems ultimately forced Sullivan to sell controlling interest of the team in 1988, while the stadium lapsed into bankruptcy.

In 1988, Kraft outbid several competitors to buy the stadium out of bankruptcy court from Sullivan for $22 million. The stadium was considered outdated and nearly worthless, but the purchase included the stadium's lease to the Patriots, which ran through 2001. Kraft bid on the Patriots franchise as well, but he lost to Victor Kiam. Sullivan and Kiam then tried to move the team to Jacksonville, but Kraft refused to let them break the lease. Kiam was nearly brought down by bad investments of his own and was forced to sell the Patriots to James Orthwein in 1992.

In 1994, Orthwein offered Kraft $75 million to buy out the remainder of the team's lease at Foxboro Stadium so he could move it to St. Louis, but Kraft declined. Orthwein was no longer interested in operating the team in New England and decided to sell it. But the operating covenant required that any potential buyer negotiate with Kraft. With this in mind, Kraft launched what amounted to a hostile takeover, offering $172 million for an outright purchase. Future St. Louis/Los Angeles Rams owner Stan Kroenke offered more money ($200 million) with the intent to move to St. Louis. But Orthwein would have been saddled with all relocation expenses and any legal expenses from breaking the lease. When Kraft made known that he would go to court to enforce the covenant and force Kroenke to stay in Foxboro, Orthwein had little choice but to accept Kraft's offer, the highest ever made for an NFL team at the time.

Kraft said that his passion for the Patriots led him to "break every one of my financial rules" in pursuit of the team. He still believes he "overpaid" for the franchise. Kraft keeps a Victory Tour poster in his office as a reminder of what set in motion the events that allowed him to buy the Patriots. After the NFL approved the sale, the Patriots sold out their entire 1994 season, the first full sell-out in franchise history. Every Patriots home game–preseason, regular season, and playoffs–has been sold out since. In 2023, the Patriots were one of the NFL's most valuable franchises, estimated by Forbes to be worth $7 billion.

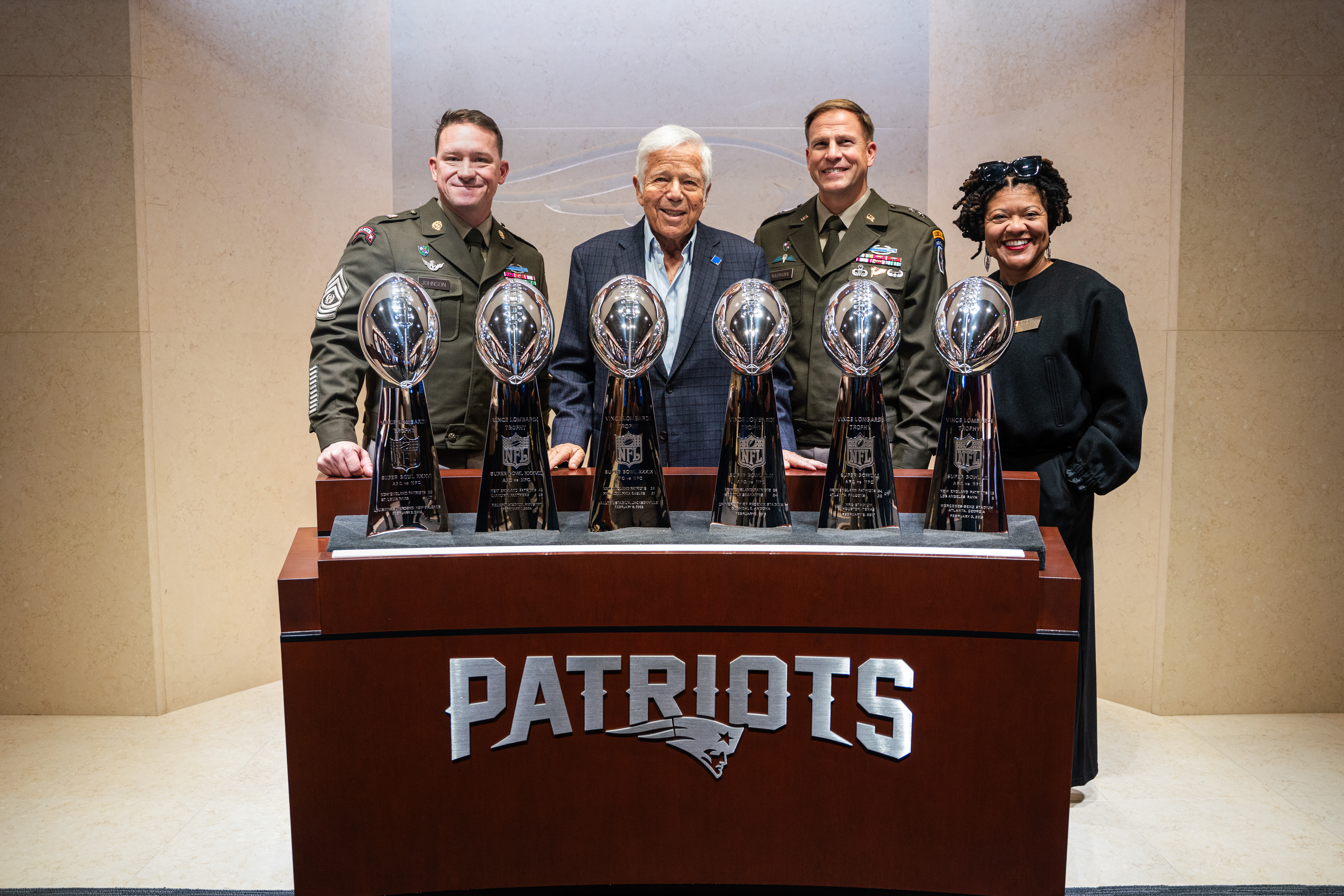
Kraft poses with the Patriots' six Vince Lombardi Trophies.

In 1998, Kraft considered moving the Patriots to Hartford, Connecticut, based on an offer that the state of Connecticut would finance a new stadium, but he terminated the deal just before it became binding, instead building a new stadium in Foxborough with Massachusetts infrastructure funding. In 2002, Kraft financed a $350-million stadium for the Patriots initially called CMGI Field but renamed Gillette Stadium. In 2007, he began to develop the land around Gillette Stadium, creating Patriot Place, a $375-million open-air shopping and entertainment center. The development included "The Hall at Patriot Place presented by Raytheon", a multi-story museum and hall of fame attached to the stadium, and the "CBS Scene", a CBS-themed restaurant.

On January 27, 2000, Kraft traded a first round draft pick to the New York Jets for the rights to hire Bill Belichick as head coach. The trade was criticized but proved successful: Belichick led the Patriots to six Super Bowl championships, nine conference championships, and 16 division titles. In the sixth round of the 2000 draft, the Patriots acquired quarterback Tom Brady, who would be the team's starter from 2001 to 2019. The relationship between Kraft, Belichick, and Brady has been credited with producing one of the most successful sports dynasties in football, although in later years the personal relationship between the three grew strained.

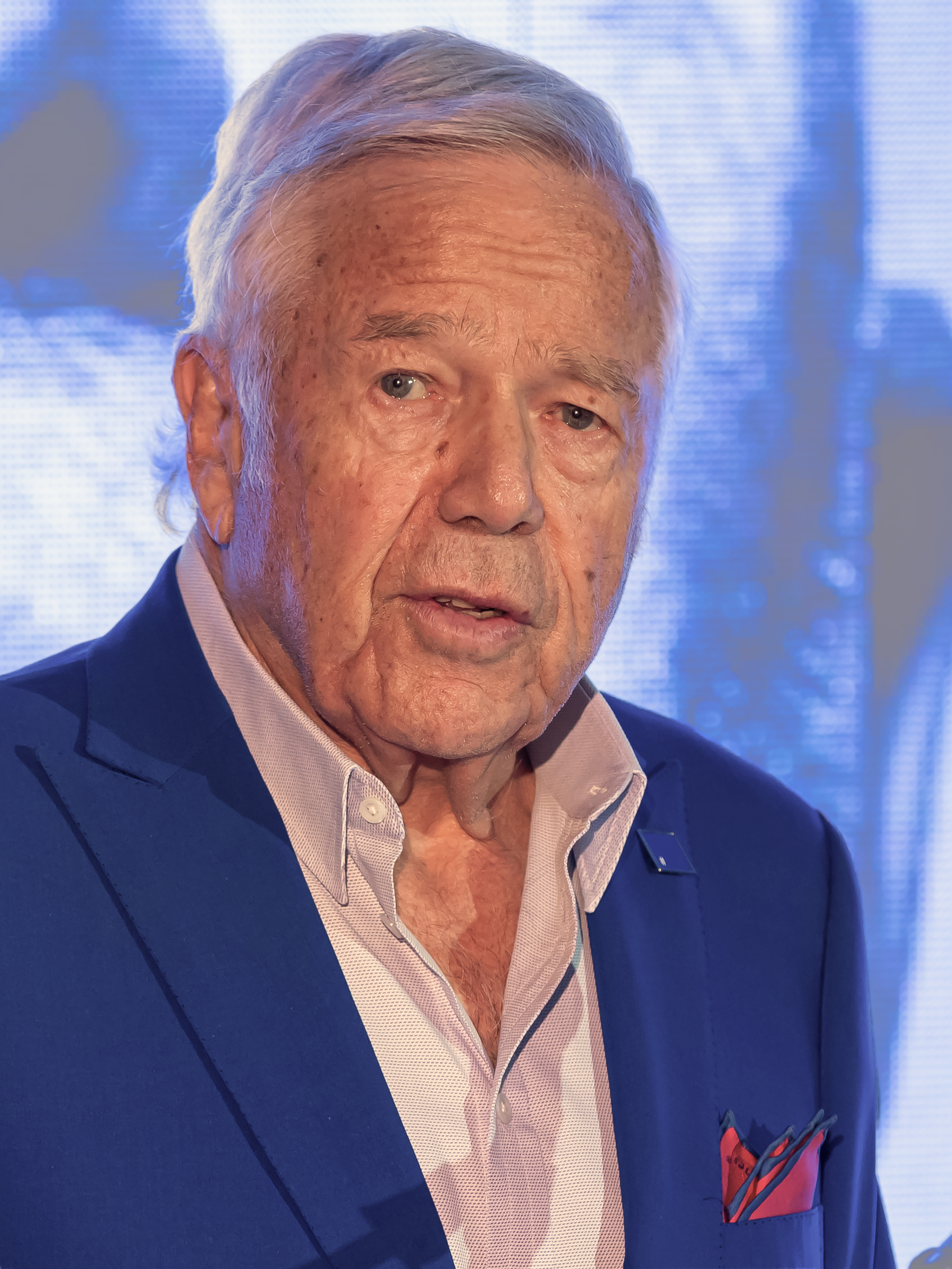
Kraft in 2023

Under Kraft's ownership, the Patriots experienced sustained success for the first time in franchise history. While they appeared in Super Bowl XX under the Sullivans, this was one of only six playoff appearances in 34 years. Indeed, that Super Bowl season saw only the second playoff victory in franchise history. The Patriots have made the playoffs 21 times in Kraft's 27 years as owner. They have won 19 AFC East titles, including all but three since 2001 and 11 in a row from 2009 to 2019. The Patriots represented the AFC in the Super Bowl in 1996 (lost), 2001 (won), 2003 (won), 2004 (won), 2007 (lost), 2011 (lost), 2014 (won), 2016 (won), 2017 (lost), 2018 (won), and 2025 (lost). After having never won more than 11 games before Kraft's arrival, the team has won at least 12 games 14 times, including finishing the 2007 regular season undefeated before losing to the New York Giants in Super Bowl XLII.

Of Kraft's role in helping settle the NFL lockout before the 2011 season, Indianapolis Colts center Jeff Saturday said, "He is a man who helped us save football."

In 2005, during a visit to Saint Petersburg, Kraft gave Russian President Vladimir Putin his third Super Bowl ring. In a statement released after the visit, Kraft said he did so out of "respect and admiration" for the Russian people and Putin's leadership. Kraft later said he had not originally intended to give Putin the ring and that his statement had been issued under pressure from the White House after Putin had kept it. The ring is on display with state gifts at the Kremlin.

Kraft speaking at the June 2026 opening of the renovated Foxboro station, accompanied by MBTA head Phillip Eng and Governor Maura Healey

Former Patriot Ryan O'Callaghan wrote that Kraft supported him when he publicly came out as gay in 2017. According to O'Callaghan, Kraft invited him to a reception and said "What you did took a lot of courage. I'm so proud of you" and that he would be "forever a Patriot".

In June 2024, Kraft enshrined Tom Brady into the Patriots Hall of Fame and announced that Brady's jersey number 12 would be retired. Over 60,000 Patriots fans attended the ceremony.

=== Soccer ===
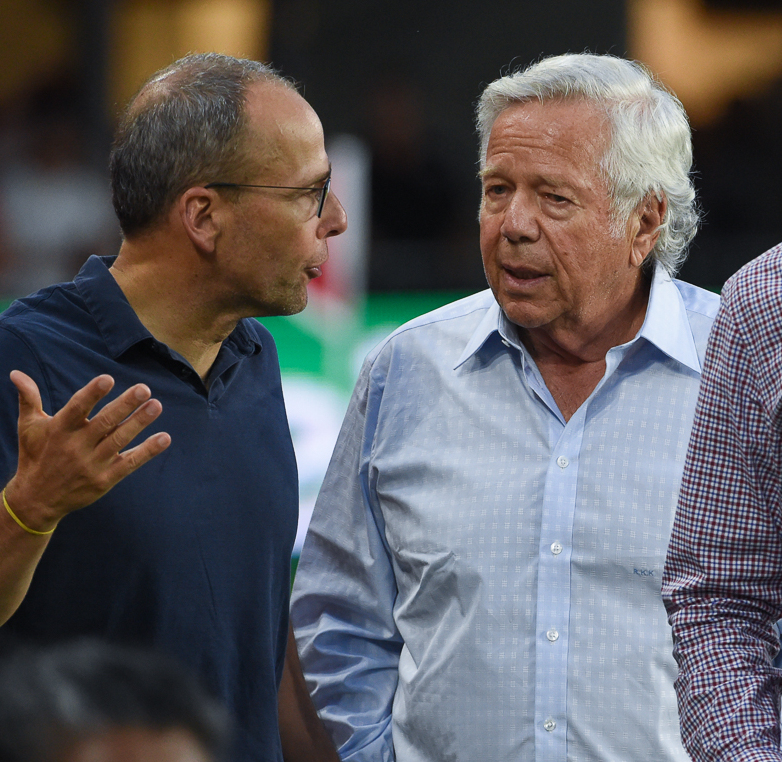
Kraft speaks with his son Jonathan at a 2018 New England Revolution game

In 1996, Kraft founded the New England Revolution, a charter member of Major League Soccer which began playing alongside the Patriots at Foxboro Stadium. Kraft also owned the San Jose Clash (later San Jose Earthquakes) from 1998 to 2000.

In November 2005, Kraft met with Rick Parry, the chief executive of English Premier League team Liverpool. Kraft was rumored to be interested in investing money into the 2004–05 Champions League winners. He told BBC Radio 5 Live: "Liverpool is a great brand and it's something our family respects a lot. We're always interested in opportunities and growing, so you never know what can happen." However, the club was eventually sold to American duo George Gillett and Tom Hicks. Liverpool is now owned by Fenway Sports Group, owners of fellow Boston-based sport team the Boston Red Sox.

In October 2017, Kraft said that he was "still intrigued" by the possibility of buying a Premier League football club, but that he was concerned about the lack of a salary cap in British football.

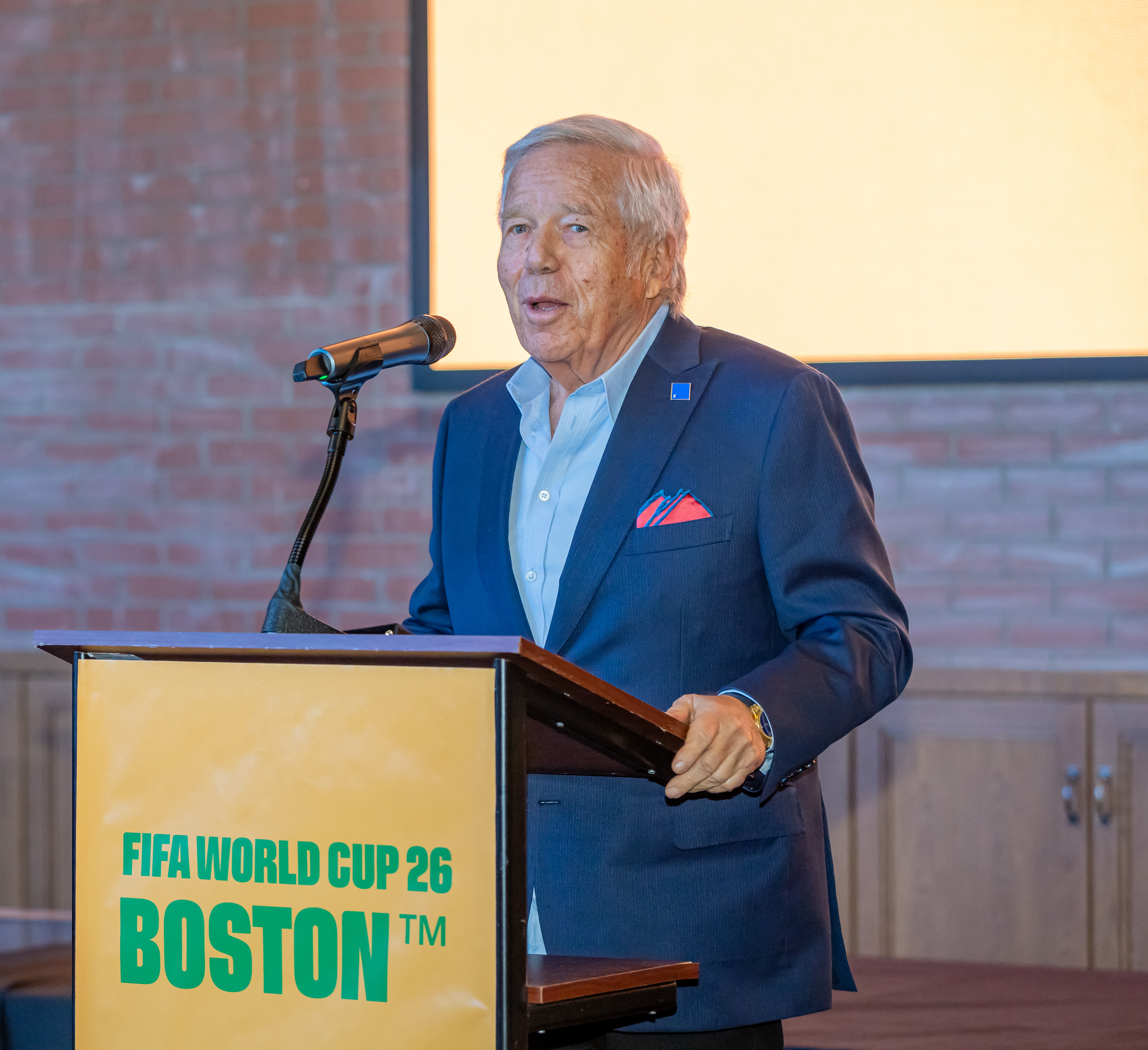
Kraft in 2023 at an event promoting matches of the 2026 FIFA World Cup that are scheduled to be held at Kraft's Gillette Stadium

In 2017, Kraft was named the Honorary Chairman of the board of directors for the successful joint Canadian-Mexican-American bid for the 2026 FIFA World Cup.

In 2019, Kraft hired Bruce Arena as head coach and sporting director of the New England Revolution. In 2020, the team had their first playoff win in six years.

=== Esports ===
Blizzard Entertainment announced in July 2017 that Kraft bought ownership in the Boston Uprising, one of the first seven teams for the professional esports Overwatch League. They played in Season 1 of the Overwatch League. Preseason for the league began December 6, 2017, and the regular season started on January 10, 2018. Boston Uprising finished third in the Overwatch League's inaugural season.

== Philanthropy ==
Myra and Robert Kraft have donated hundreds of millions of dollars to charity, including education, child- and women-related issues, healthcare, youth sports and American and Israeli causes. Among the institutions the Krafts have supported are Columbia University, Harvard Business School, Brandeis University, the College of the Holy Cross, Boston College, Tufts University, Rice University, Yeshiva University, the Belmont Hill School, and the Boys & Girls Clubs of Boston.

In 1989, the Krafts launched the Passport to Israel Fund, in collaboration with Combined Jewish Philanthropies of Greater Boston (CJP), to help parents send their teenage children to Israel. One its projects is supporting American Football Israel, including Kraft Family Stadium in Jerusalem and the Kraft Family Israel Football League. In 1990, Kraft, his wife, and his father-in-law funded a joint professorship between Brandeis University and the College of the Holy Cross, forming the Kraft-Hiatt endowed chairs in comparative religion—the first inter-religious endowed chairs in the United States.

In 2000, Kraft donated $11.5 million to construct the Columbia/Barnard Hillel, which is made of the white stone used in Jerusalem. In 2007, after a $5 million payment to Columbia's intercollegiate athletics program, the playing field at Columbia's Lawrence A. Wien Stadium at the Baker Field Athletics Complex was named Robert K. Kraft Field.

In 2011, the Krafts pledged $20 million to Partners HealthCare to launch the Kraft Family National Center for Leadership and Training in Community Health, an initiative designed to improve access to quality healthcare at New England community health centers. The Krafts supported the Dana–Farber Cancer Institute in Boston.

After the Boston Marathon bombing in 2013, Kraft announced he would match up to $100,000 in donations made for the victims through the New England Patriots Charitable Foundation.

In 2017, Kraft announced a contribution of $6 million to build the first regulation-size American football field in Israel. In June 2017, Kraft and several NFL Hall of Famers traveled to Israel for the grand opening of the Kraft Family Sports Campus. Since then, he has led additional "Touchdown in Israel" trips to Israel, with Patriots and Hall of Famers. Also in 2017, Kraft funded a new van as part of the Kraft Center for Community Health at Massachusetts General Hospital to help combat the opioid crisis in Boston. The vans allow those with opioid addiction to seek health services in their neighborhoods. The Center awards the Kraft Prize for Excellence and Innovation in Community Health yearly to recognize organizations, programs, or initiatives making a meaningful impact on the field with potential to forward community health at scale. Past winners include Oben Health and Malama Health.

In 2018, Kraft donated $10 million to Combined Jewish Philanthropies of Greater Boston for the renovation of its headquarters in downtown Boston. In 2019, Kraft and Chelsea Football Club owner Roman Abramovich hosted "Final Whistle on Hate", a soccer match between the New England Revolution and Chelsea F.C. to raise money to combat antisemitism. The match raised an estimated $4 million, with Kraft personally contributing $1 million.

The next month, he pledged $100,000 to the families of seven motorcyclists killed in a crash the month before. Kraft donated $20,000 and attended the memorial in Worcester to honor fallen firefighter Christopher Roy on the first anniversary of his death. Kraft teamed with recording artists Jay-Z and Meek Mill, Fanatics executive chairman Michael G. Rubin, and others to announce REFORM Alliance, a criminal justice reform foundation. In coordination with REFORM Alliance, Kraft invited more than 50 children aged 5 to 17 to fly on the Patriots' team charter to attend a game against the Buffalo Bills at Gillette Stadium. The children all had parents who had been incarcerated for technical probation violations. As of 2019, Kraft had led 27 missions to Israel.

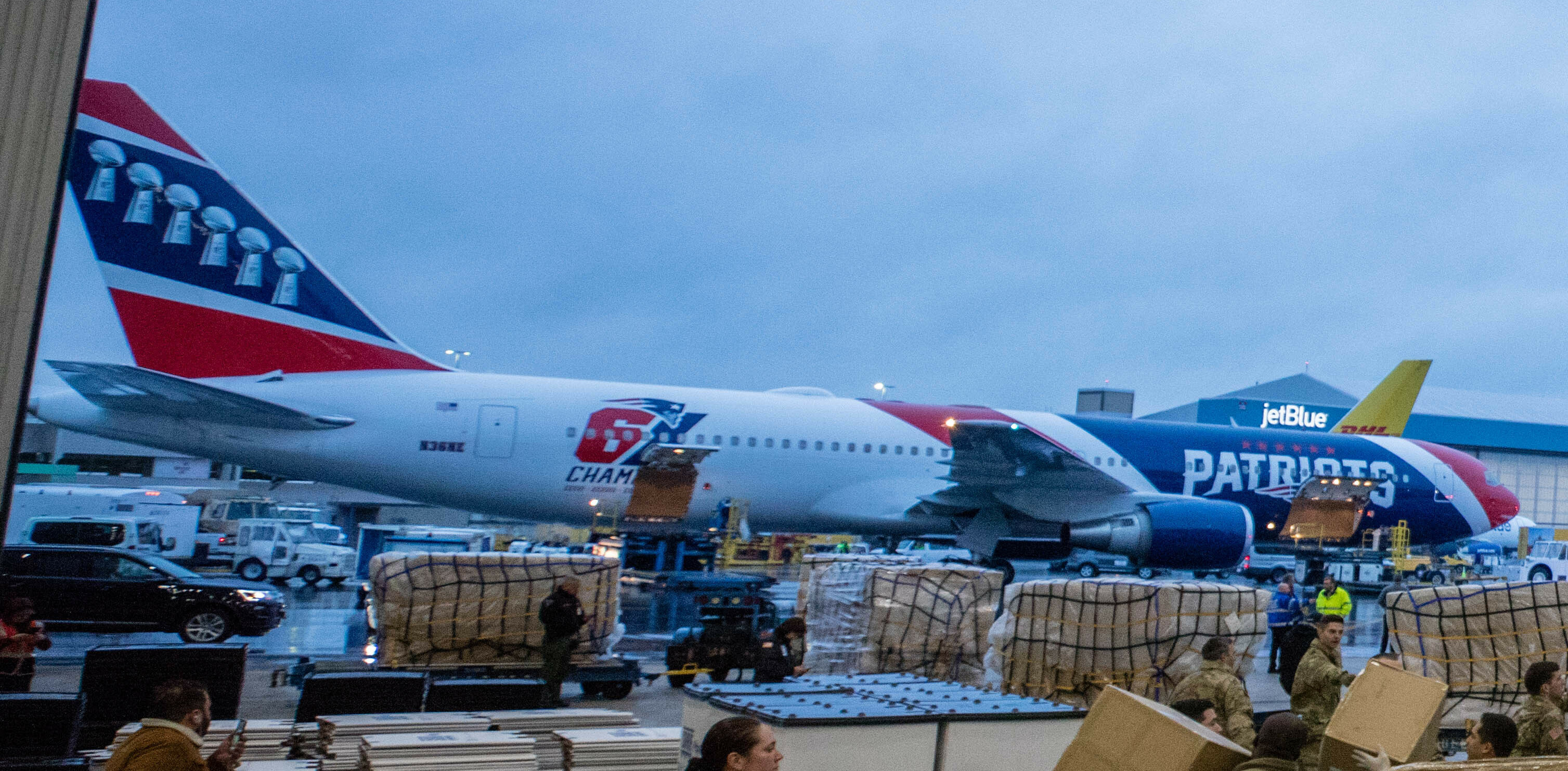
The Patriots' team plane delivering N95 masks to Logan International Airport in April 2020

In 2020, Kraft partnered with Chinese company Tencent to purchase 1.2 million N95 masks to donate to medical workers in New York and Massachusetts to help combat the COVID-19 pandemic, sending the Patriots' private team plane to China to pick up the supplies. Kraft initially negotiated for 1.7 million masks, but only 1.2 million fit on board. They were allowed three hours on the ground in China at Shenzhen Bao'an International Airport. The plane delivered 500,000 vaccines to El Salvador in May 2021. Using the Patriots truck, they distributed 300,000 masks in New York City, 900,000 in Massachusetts, and 100,000 in Rhode Island.

In May 2020, Kraft put his Super Bowl LI ring up for auction with proceeds designated to help feed those facing food insecurity as a result of the COVID-19 pandemic.

Kraft lent the Patriots team plane to the University of Rhode Island Rams football team in October 2021 after the team's charter flight fell through. He covered all costs despite the URI Rams expecting to pay expenses through the team's budget.

In April 2022, Harvard Business School announced the creation of the Robert K. Kraft Family Fellowship Fund, committing $24 million to benefit potential students with limited means to attend HBS.

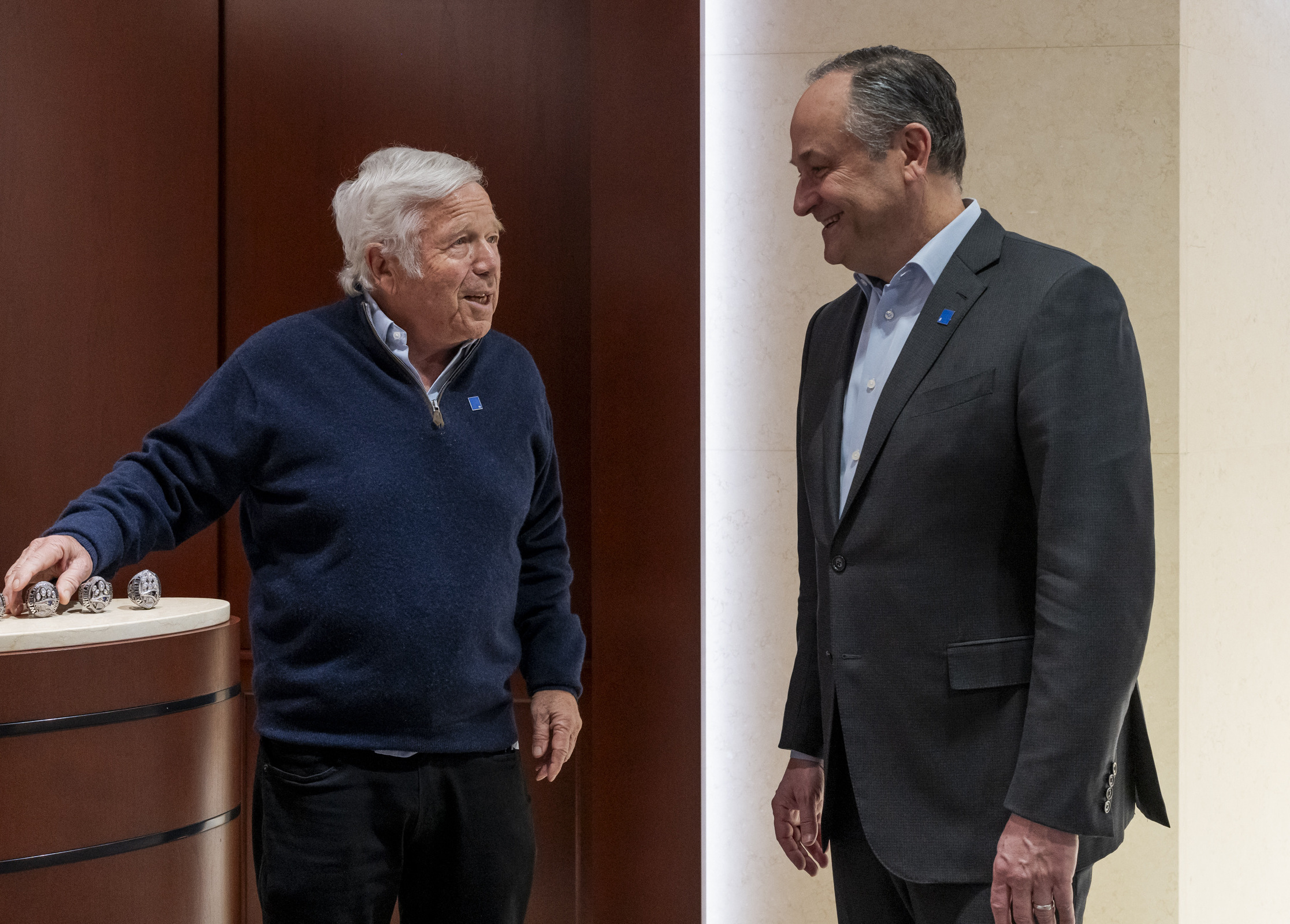
Kraft speaks with U.S. second gentleman Doug Emhoff during a Jewish War Veterans event held at Gillette Stadium in February 2024

On October 30, 2022, the Foundation to Combat Antisemitism (FCAS), which Kraft founded, sponsored an ad encouraging people to denounce hate against Jewish people. The ad aired during NFL games and was titled "Stand Up to Jewish Hate". It came in response to antisemitic comments made by Kanye West and Kyrie Irving. Kraft invested $25 million in the "Stand Up to Jewish Hate" campaign, which launched through the foundation in March 2023 to raise awareness of online antisemitism. The foundation's executive director said the ads would air during the NFL draft, the NBA and NHL playoffs, and on social media. In October 2025, the Foundation to Combat Antisemitism rebranded as Blue Square Alliance Against Hate.

2026 reporting on the Kraft Family Foundation described Jewish causes as one of its largest areas of grantmaking and listed Machne Israel and Chabad of Southampton among recent grantees, alongside institutions such as the Jewish Museum and Friends of United Hatzalah.

In September 2026, Kraft donated $10 million toward a $25 million campaign to convert Kutz Hall at Brandeis University into the Robert K. Kraft Family Center for Jewish Life and Leadership, a planned home for the university's Hillel chapter.

In October 2026, Kraft donated $5 million toward the construction of a $25 million Chabad center in Chestnut Hill, Massachusetts. The facility was planned to be named the Kraft Family Chabad at Chestnut Hill.

== Personal life ==
In June 1963, Kraft married Myra Nathalie Hiatt, a 1964 graduate of Brandeis University and the daughter of the late Worcester, Massachusetts, businessman and philanthropist Jacob Hiatt. She died on July 20, 2011, of ovarian cancer, aged 68. The Krafts were members of Temple Emanuel in Newton, Massachusetts. A patch bearing Kraft's initials (MHK) appeared on the Patriots' uniform jersey throughout the 2011 season. The couple had four sons: Jonathan Kraft, Daniel Kraft, Joshua Kraft, and David Kraft.

In June 2012, Kraft began dating actress Ricki Noel Lander. In July 2012, Kraft assisted Lander in creating an audition video for a role in The Internship. Lander and Kraft broke up in 2018.

In early 2022, Kraft's engagement to New York City-based ophthalmologist Dana Blumberg was announced by Tommy Hilfiger at the inaugural amfAR Gala Palm Beach event. Kraft and Blumberg reportedly began dating in 2017. They married in New York City in October 2022. Ed Sheeran performed at the wedding.

== Politics ==
=== Support for Israel ===
The Intercept reported in 2026 that, according to tax records dating back to 2006, Kraft has donated to various pro-Israel organizations: Kraft Family Foundation had donated $196,000 to the Friends of the Israel Defense Forces and $123,000 to other organizations directly serving soldiers and veterans of the Israeli military. The Kraft Group limited liability company has given $3 million to the United Democracy Project super political action committee (super PAC) of the American Israel Public Affairs Committee (AIPAC) since 2022. Kraft's foundation has also given $63,500 to the Committee for Accuracy in Middle East Reporting and Analysis (CAMERA), including a $36,000 contribution in 2018 with the memo line "fighting antisemitism". In 2011–12, it also gave approximately $50,000 to The Investigative Project on Terrorism. From 2008 to 2018, it gave $150,000 to the Middle East Media and Research Institute (MEMRI).

Kraft has also organized visits to Israel for NFL players, including Tom Brady.

In June 2019, Kraft received Israel's Genesis Prize. At the ceremony in Jerusalem, he pledged $20 million to establish Foundation to Combat Antisemitism (rebranded as Blue Square Alliance Against Hate), which he pledged would combat the Palestinian-led Boycott, Divestment, and Sanctions (BDS) movement against Israel, saying that it "and other efforts to delegitimize and undermine the State of Israel are the most disconcerting times for the country I love so much". Israeli Prime Minister Benjamin Netanyahu said, "Israel does not have a more loyal friend than Robert Kraft."

In April 2024, during the Gaza war protests at Columbia University, Kraft stopped funding the university "over the treatment of Jewish students and faculty during pro-Palestinian protests at the campus", citing "virulent hate". According to Adam Saifer and Fahad Ahmad, Kraft is among "billionaire donors" who "have used their vast wealth—and the threat of withdrawing it—to demand a severe crackdown on student protesters expressing solidarity with Palestine" since October 2023.

Kraft led efforts to remove Macklemore from Ed Sheeran's 2026 Loop Tour after he said "free Palestine" onstage and performed "Hind's Hall", a song inspired by the Gaza solidarity protests at Columbia and the "Hinds Hall" occupation of Hamilton Hall, renamed by protesters in honor of Hind Rajab, a Palestinian girl in the Gaza Strip killed by the Israel Defense Forces (IDF) during the Gaza war. Kraft called Sheeran to say he would not be allowed to perform at Gillette Stadium, which is owned by the Kraft Group, if Macklemore was not removed from the tour. Macklemore was subsequently dropped from the tour.

Hours after Macklemore posted a detailed account of his perspective on being removed from the tour on social media, Kraft released a statement in which he spoke of his long fight against antisemitism, agreed with Macklemore on the suffering of the Palestinians, evoked the responsibility of Hamas, invited Macklemore to meet, and said they had "peace for all people" as a common goal.

=== US politics ===
Kraft is a member of the Democratic Party, but has supported candidates of both major parties (Democrats and Republicans) financially. He was elected chairman of the Newton Democratic City Committee when he was 27. Kraft considered running against Representative Philip J. Philbin in 1970 but chose not to, citing the loss of privacy and strain on his family that politics would have caused. Kraft was further discouraged from entering politics by the 1970 suicide of his friend State Representative H. James Shea Jr.

Kraft has a friendship with Donald Trump that dates to the 1990s. In 2017, he donated $1 million to Trump's inauguration day celebrations. Kraft had also donated to Trump's presidential campaign. In 2020, NBA coach Gregg Popovich called Kraft "hypocritical" for supporting Trump while claiming to advocate for social justice. It was reported that Kraft had distanced himself from Trump after the January 6, 2021 attack on the US Capitol. But in early 2025, reports emerged that the two had resumed speaking to each other and were once again being described by media as allies. In February 2025, Trump named Kraft's wife, Dana Blumberg, to the board of the Kennedy Center for the Performing Arts. Blumberg was appointed to replace Carlos Elizondo as part of a greater effort to purge board members and exert control over it.

Since 2017, Kraft has owned two Boeing 767 private jets used by the New England Patriots. As of June 2022, one of these had been used for at least three flights deporting migrants from the US to Honduras. Neither Kraft nor the Patriots commented on this, but they later canceled their contract with the charter airline that operated those flights; in 2024, they signed a new charter contract with Omni Air International, which also operates deportation flights on behalf of ICE.

Suspended funding amid Gaza solidarity protests at Columbia

In April 2024, during the Gaza solidarity protests at Columbia University, Kraft announced that he was suspending his financial support for the university over concerns about the treatment of Jewish students and faculty during pro-Palestinian demonstrations. Kraft said he was no longer comfortable supporting Columbia until corrective action was taken, citing what he called "virulent hate" on campus.

Macklemore–Ed Sheeran controversy

In September 2026, Kraft became involved in the controversy surrounding Macklemore's removal from Ed Sheeran's 2026 Loop Tour following Macklemore's public support for Palestine and his performance of "Hind's Hall", a protest song inspired by the 2024 Gaza solidarity protests at Columbia University and named for the protesters' occupation of Hamilton Hall, which they renamed in honor of Hind Rajab.

Macklemore said Kraft had contacted Sheeran and told him that Macklemore would not be permitted to perform at Gillette Stadium, which is owned by the Kraft Group, if he remained on the tour. Kraft confirmed his involvement in the decision to prevent Macklemore from performing at Gillette Stadium.

After the controversy, Kraft released a statement discussing his longstanding opposition to antisemitism, acknowledging the suffering of Palestinians, and criticizing Hamas's role in the conflict. He also invited Macklemore to meet with him and expressed a goal of peace for all people.

== Legal issues ==
In 2019, Kraft was among 25 people facing first-degree misdemeanor charges for soliciting prostitution at a day spa. His attorney electronically entered a not-guilty plea, and later submitted a court filing where Kraft waived arraignment, pled not guilty to all charges and requested a jury trial. A memo filed by Kraft's attorneys revealed that hidden cameras had been installed when investigators entered the facility under the guise of suspected human trafficking. A Palm Beach County judge ruled that prosecutors could not use the videos in their case, citing privacy concerns. A Florida appeals court also ruled that Kraft's constitutional rights were violated, and all the charges were dropped. U.S. District Judge Rodolfo Ruiz ordered the videos to be destroyed.

In 2026, it was revealed that Kraft had kept a relationship with Jeffrey Epstein and that Epstein had recommended Kraft use his lawyer to defeat the charges.

== Awards and honors ==
NFL

- Six-time Super Bowl champion (as the owner of the Patriots: XXXVI, XXXVIII, XXXIX, XLIX, LI, LIII)
- George Halas Award (2012)

NCAA

- Theodore Roosevelt Award (2006)
- John Jay Award from Columbia University (1987)
- Alexander Hamilton Medal from Columbia University (2004)
- Columbia University football field renamed Robert K. Kraft Field.
- Honorary doctorate in humane letters (2015) from Yeshiva University.

MLS

- New England Revolution (as the owner): 2021 Supporters Shield, 2007 U.S. Open Cup, 2008 North American SuperLiga

Organizational

- Inducted into the American Academy of Arts and Sciences (2011).
- Carnegie Hall Medal of Excellence (2013)
- Genesis Prize (2019)

Sporting positions
Preceded by James Orthwein	Principal Owner of the New England Patriots; 1994–present	Incumbent
Honorary titles
Preceded by Sally Ride	Recipient of the Theodore Roosevelt Award; 2006	Succeeded by Paul Tagliabue
Preceded by Natalie Portman	Recipient of the Genesis Prize; 2019	Succeeded by Natan Sharansky
