= FCAS =

FCAS may refer to:

- Familial cold autoinflammatory syndrome, a genetic disease
- Fellow of the Casualty Actuarial Society, a U.S. professional society
- The Foundation to Combat Antisemitism, a philanthropic effort by Robert Kraft
- Frequency Control Ancillary Services for electric power grids
- Future Combat Air System, a former sixth-generation fighter jet previously developed by France, Germany, and Spain, cancelled in 2026
- Future Combat Air System (UK), a sixth-generation fighter jet, the BAE Systems Tempest, and related technologies currently under development by the United Kingdom, Italy and Sweden.
- FCA Serbia, a car manufacturer
