= 2019 Genesis Prize =

The 2019 Genesis Prize was awarded to the National Football League's New England Patriots owner Robert Kraft. This was the sixth awarding of the Genesis Prize.

== Background ==
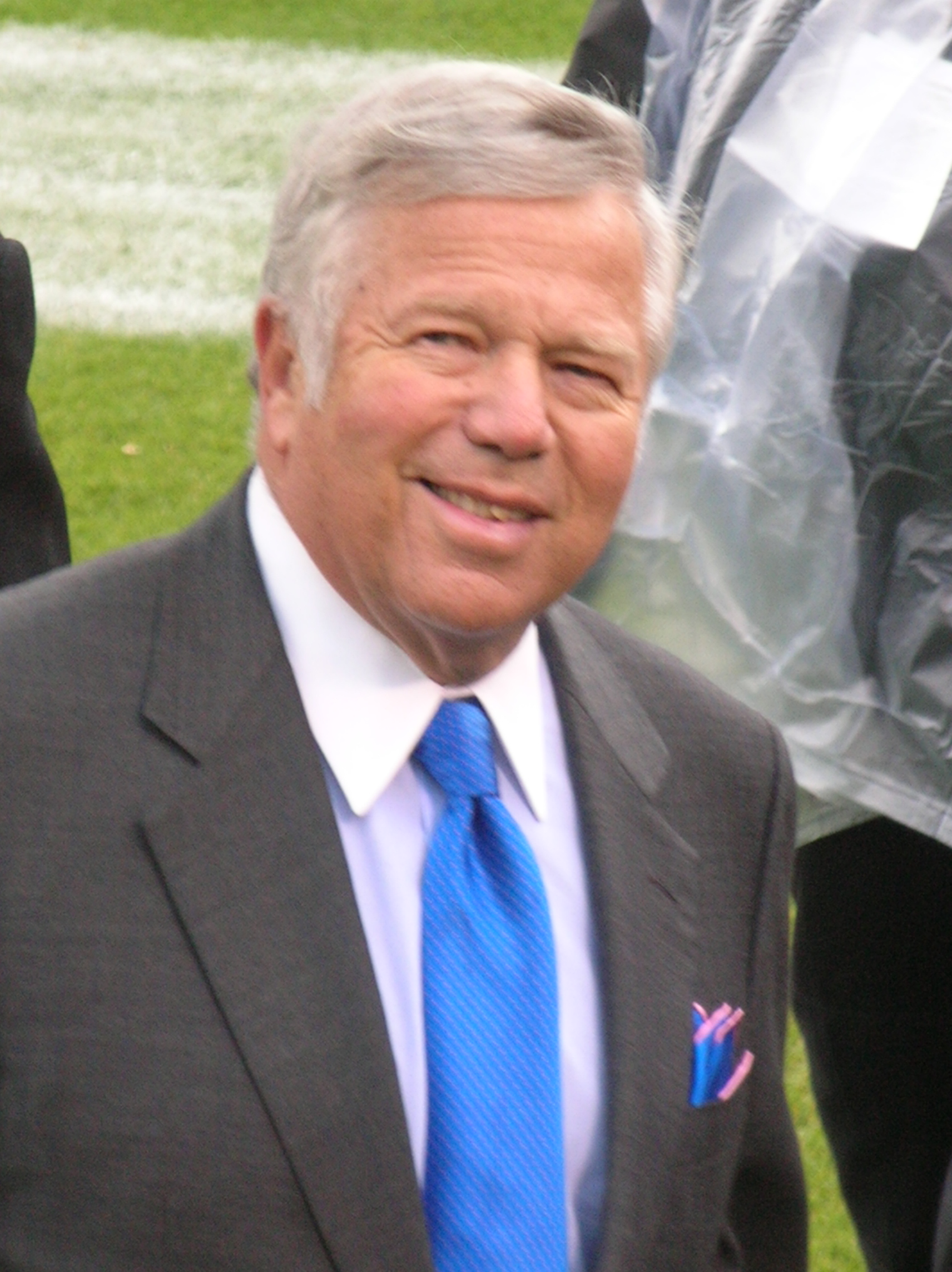
2019 Geneses Prize Laureate Robert Kraft

In January 2019, it was announced Kraft was chosen as the Genesis Prize laureate in recognition of his philanthropy, commitment to Israel, social justice, and equality. Kraft pledged to donate the $1 million award to combating anti-Semitism and efforts to delegitimize Israel.

== Controversy ==
Shortly after Kraft was announced the 2019 Laureate, he was charged with soliciting a prostitute at a Florida massage parlor. The ceremony went ahead as planned and in 2020, all charges were dropped against Kraft.

== Ceremony ==
Held at the Jerusalem Theatre, the ceremony was hosted by Martin Short. A number of past and present New England Patriots players accompanied Kraft to Israel for the awarding of the prize, including Julian Edelman and Drew Bledsoe.

== Aftermath ==
Kraft personally donated $20 million to seed the creation of the Foundation to Combat Anti-Semitism (later rebranded as the Blue Square Alliance Against Hate, which has become well known for its Super Bowl commercials.) Philanthropist Roman Abramovich later added $5 million, and an anonymous donor committed an additional $5 million. In addition to starting this foundation, a competition “Speak Out for Israel” was run to identify and award grants to Israeli organizations working to combat antisemitism and delegitimization of Israel.
