= Kraft Group =

American group of large corporations

The Kraft Group
- Type: Private
- Industry: Conglomerate
- Founded: 1998; 28 years ago
- Founder: Robert Kraft
- Headquarters: Foxborough, Massachusetts, United States
- Key people: Robert Kraft, Chairman and CEO; Jonathan Kraft, President and COO; Michael Quattromani, CFO; Daniel Kraft; Josh Kraft
- Products: Paper and packaging materials Real estate development Professional sports Manufacturing; Financial services
- Services: Professional sports; Manufacturing; Real-estate development; Private equity investments
- Revenue: ▲US $3.5 billion (estimated 2015)
- Number of employees: 12,900 (2018)
- Website: www.thekraftgroup.com

The Kraft Group, LLC, is a group of privately held companies in the professional sports, manufacturing, and real estate development industries doing business in 90 countries. Founded in 1998 by American businessman Robert Kraft as a holding company for various interests he had acquired since 1968, it is based in Foxborough, Massachusetts.

== Corporate structure ==
- Kraft Sports Group
  - New England Patriots, LP (founded in 1960, acquired by Kraft in 1994)
  - New England Revolution, LP (founded by Kraft in 1995)
  - Gillette Stadium, $325 million facility privately financed by Kraft (opened 2002)
    - Patriot Place, $350 million "lifestyle and entertainment center" around Gillette Stadium (opened 2007–2008)
  - TeamOps, LLC (founded in 2006)
    - TeamOps (Event Staff)
    - TeamOps Detect
  - Boston Breach, a Call of Duty League team (Founded in 2021, sold to M80 in 2026 to become M80 Boston)
  - Boston Uprising, an Overwatch League team (Founded in 2017, folded in 2024)
  - Oxygen Esports, a Rainbow Six Siege team (Founded in 2020)
- Kraft Analytics Group (KAGR)
- Rand-Whitney Group, LLC (founded in 1857, acquired by Kraft in 1968)
  - Previously owned by Jacob Hiatt, father of Kraft's wife Myra Kraft
  - Based in Worcester, Massachusetts, includes:
    - Rand-Whitney Container, LLP
    - Rand-Whitney Containerboard, LLP
    - Rand-Whitney Waste, LLP
- International Forest Products, LLC (founded by Kraft in 1972)
  - Operated by Robert Kraft's son Daniel Kraft
- More than 30 private equity investments
  - Principal shareholdings
    - Carmel Container Systems, Ltd.
      - Based in Caesarea, Israel
    - American-Israeli Paper Mills, Ltd.
      - Based in Hadera, Israel
    - Ampal Enterprises, Ltd.
      - Based in Tel Aviv, Israel

== Political donations ==
In 2023, Kraft Group donated $500,000 to the pro-Israel lobby group AIPAC.
