= Daniel Kraft =

American businessman

- Born: Daniel A. Kraft
- Education: Tufts University (B.A.)
- Occupation: Businessman
- Spouse: Wendy
- Parents: Robert Kraft (father); Myra Hiatt (mother)
- Relatives: Jonathan Kraft (brother); Josh Kraft (brother); Jacob Hiatt (grandfather)

Daniel A. Kraft is an American businessman. He is a son of Robert Kraft, and is president of the family-owned Kraft Group International.

A former collegiate lacrosse player, Kraft has been involved in promoting the sport in Israel.

== Early life and education ==
Kraft is one of four sons born to Jewish American parents Robert Kraft and Myra Kraft (née Hiatt). His father is a billionaire businessman.

Kraft received a bachelor's degree from Tufts University in 1987. While at Tufts, Kraft played lacrosse for the Tufts Jumbos.

== Career ==
After graduating from Tufts, Kraft worked at TeleRep.

In 1994, Kraft began working for his family's Kraft Sports Group as vice president of marketing. Kraft currently serves as the president of his family's Kraft Group International. Since 1997, he has been president and executive of the Kraft Group's paper products subsidiary International Forest Products LLC. Kraft is a member of the American Forest & Paper Association's executive board, joining in 2022.

Kraft is on the board of directors for the Dana-Farber Cancer Institute. He previously was a trustee of Tufts University. He was a founding board member of Team IMPACT.

In 2023, Boston magazine ranked Kraft and his brothers Jonathan and Josh at number 11 on its list of the "most influential Bostonians", grouping the three brothers as a single entity.

=== Israeli lacrosse ===
Since 2012, Kraft has been involved in promoting the sport of lacrosse in Israel. Kraft was the board chair of the Israeli Lacrosse sports body. His son, Joey, has played on the Israel men's national lacrosse team, as well as for the Tufts Jumbos collegiate lacrosse team.

The Israeli national lacrosse center in Ashkelon is named the "Daniel Kraft Family National Lacrosse Center", and opened in 2019. The Daniel and Wendy Kraft Lacrosse Scholarship has provided funding for Israeli youth lacrosse players to travel to the US and participate in lacrosse clinics and tournaments.

== Personal life ==
Kraft is married to Wendy Kraft.
