= Jonathan Kraft =

American businessman (born 1964)

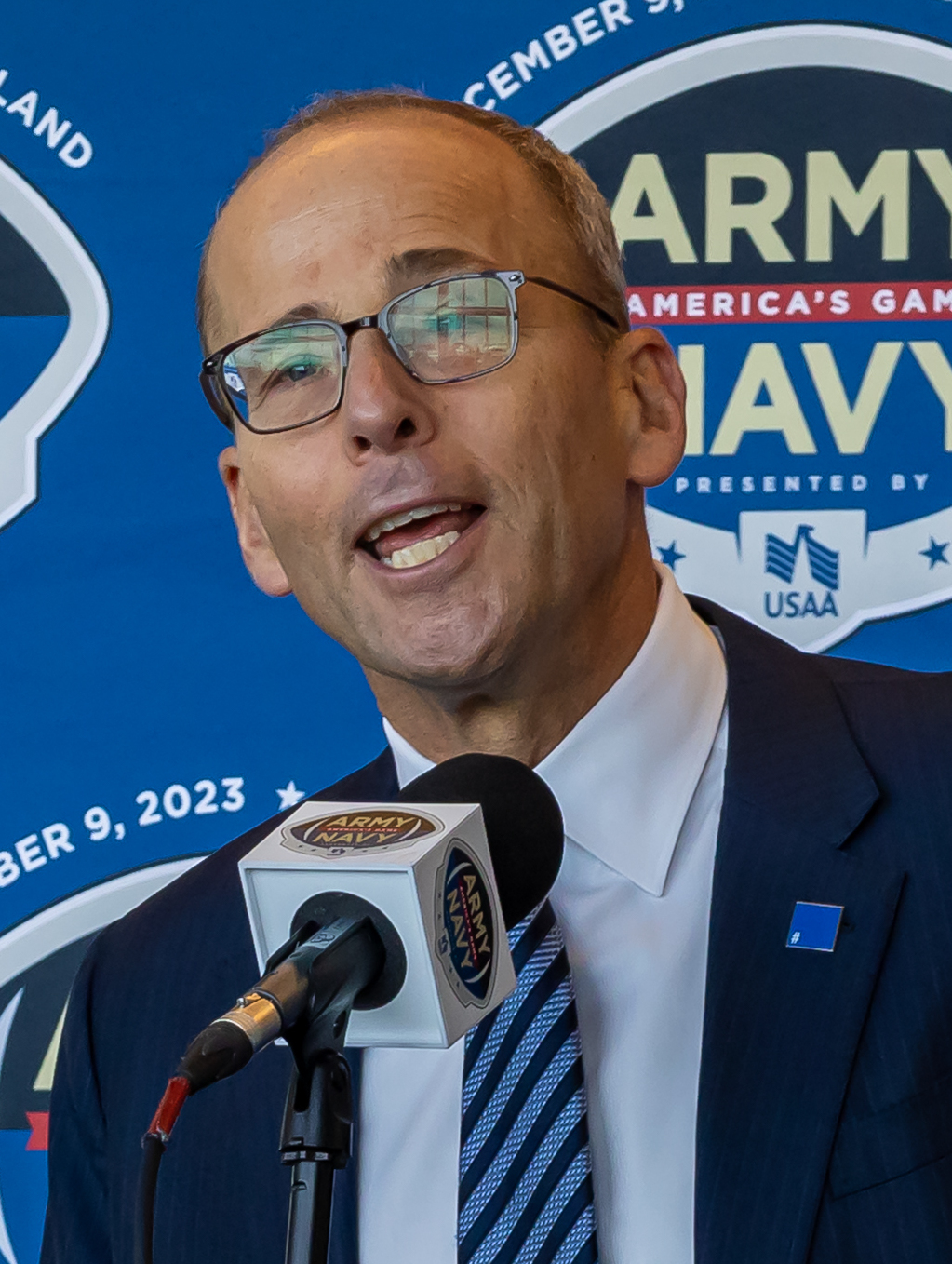
- Kraft in 2023
- Born: Jonathan Ashford Kraft; March 4, 1964 (age 62); Brookline, Massachusetts, U.S.
- Education: Williams College (BA); Harvard University (MBA)
- Occupation: Businessman
- Known for: President of The Kraft Group; President of the New England Patriots
- Spouse: Patricia Lipoma
- Children: 3
- Parent(s): Robert Kraft; Myra Hiatt
- Relatives: Daniel Kraft (brother); Josh Kraft (brother); Jacob Hiatt (grandfather)
- Football career

Career history
- New England Patriots (1994–present); Vice president (1994–1999); Vice chairman (2000–2005); President (2005–present)

Awards and highlights
- 6× Super Bowl champion (XXXVI, XXXVIII, XXXIX, XLIX, LI, LIII)

Jonathan Ashford Kraft (born March 4, 1964) is an American businessman. He is president of The Kraft Group, the holding company of the Kraft family's business interests. He is also the president of the New England Patriots and investor-operator of the New England Revolution.

== Early life and education ==
Kraft was born in Brookline, Massachusetts, to a Jewish family, one of four children of New England Patriots owner Robert Kraft and his late wife Myra Kraft. Robert Kraft is worth an estimated $4.8 billion, according to Forbes and ranked as 108th richest person in 2015. Kraft attended the Belmont Hill School for high school. In 1986, Kraft graduated from Williams College with a bachelor's degree in history. He served on Williams' board of trustees from 2003 until 2015. After working as a consultant at Bain & Company for two years, Kraft earned his MBA from Harvard Business School in 1990.

== Professional career ==
=== New England Patriots ===
In 1994, Kraft helped his family create a plan to purchase the New England Patriots. Since his family's purchase of the team, Kraft has held the titles of vice president, vice chairman and president.

==== Role with the NFL ====
Within the National Football League, Kraft has served on multiple committees, including the Digital Media and Business Ventures committees. In March 2006, when the National Football League Players Association and the NFL were deadlocked in contract negotiations, Kraft helped design a revenue sharing plan that was used for that version of the collective bargaining agreement.

=== New England Revolution ===
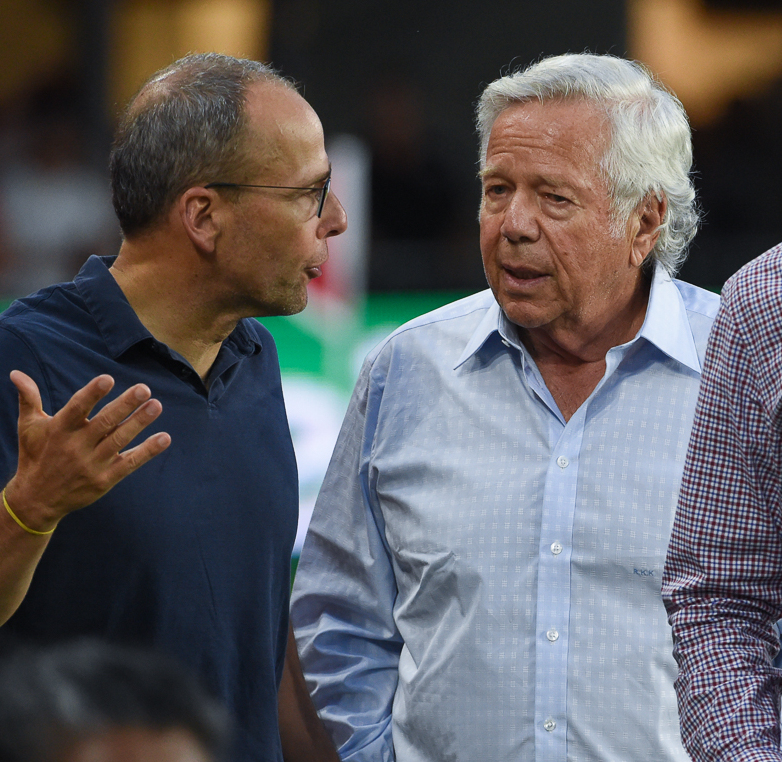
Kraft (left) speaks with his father at a 2018 New England Revolution game

In 1995, Major League Soccer was started. One of the inaugural teams in the league was the Revolution. Kraft has been the co-owner/investor of the Revolution, along with his father, since its inception. In 2002, the Revolution played in their first final against the Galaxy in the MLS Cup in front of a record crowd of more than 61,000. The final was held at Gillette Stadium, previously named CMGI Field, in Foxborough, Massachusetts. The match had a record crowd and the Revolution lost. They made four more MLS Cup appearances in 2005, 2006, 2007, and 2014.

==== Other soccer involvements ====
Kraft was also an owner/investor of the San Jose Earthquakes from 1999 to 2000 when the Kraft Group owned the team. He has been attempting to build a Boston area soccer specific stadium unsuccessfully since 2006.

=== Massachusetts General Hospital ===
Kraft has served on the board of trustees of Massachusetts General Hospital since 2010 and was named chair in 2019 after the departure of Cathy Minehan.

==== COVID-19 pandemic ====
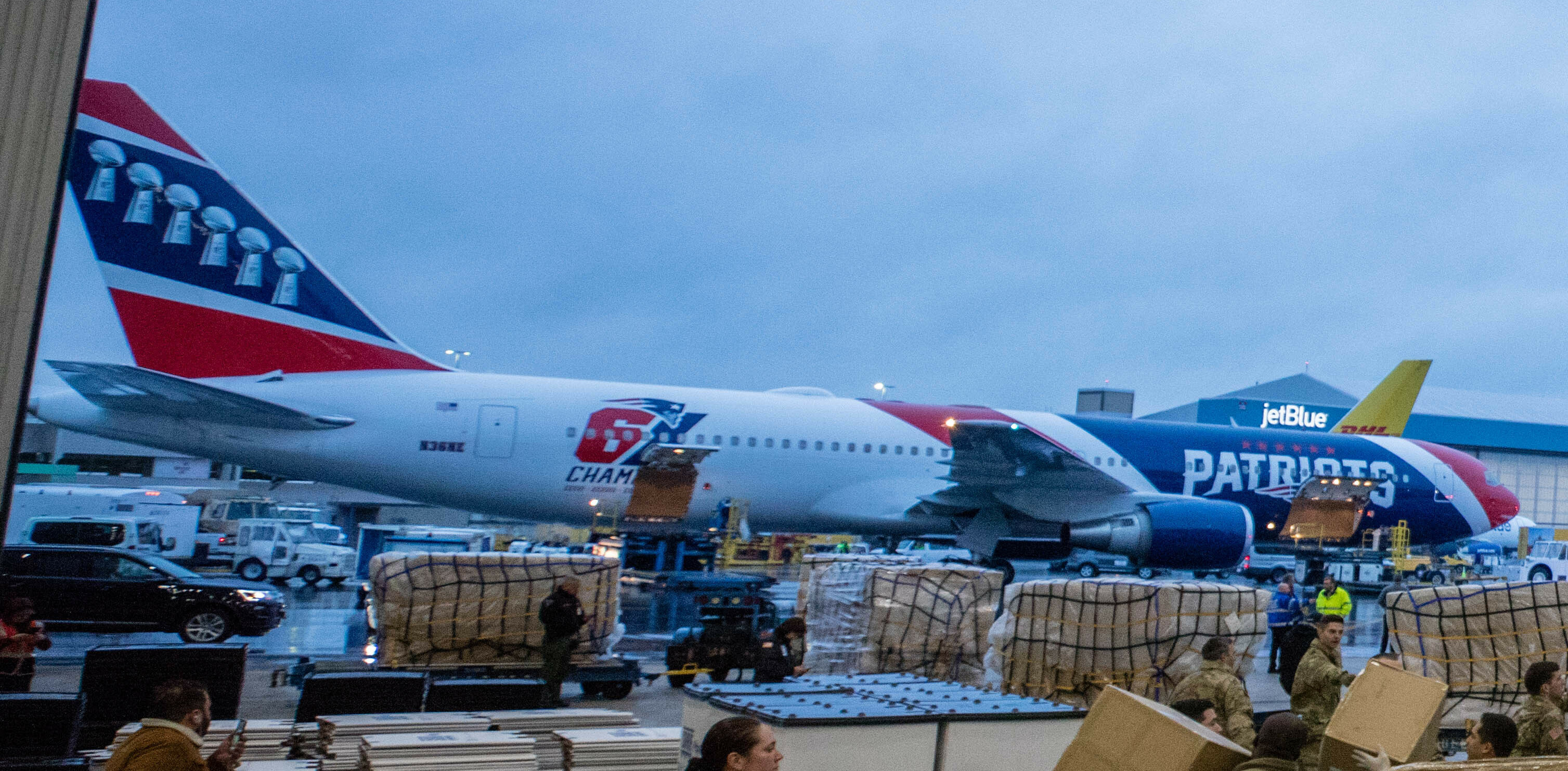
The Patriots' team airplane delivering N95 masks supplies in April 2020

In March 2020, Kraft and his father offered the use of the Patriots team airplane to Massachusetts to deliver more than a million N95 masks from Shenzhen, China for use by medical professionals to help mitigate the COVID-19 pandemic in the United States. Some of the supplies landed in Boston on April 2, 2020, after several weeks of preparation.

== Personal life ==
In 1995, Kraft married Patricia Lipoma in a Jewish ceremony at the Chestnut Hill home of his parents. She is a convert to Judaism. He has three children, two sons and a daughter.

== Awards and honors ==
In 2023, Boston magazine ranked Kraft and his brothers Daniel and Josh at number 11 on its annual list of the "most influential Bostonians", grouping these three Kraft brothers as a single entity. The following year, the magazine individually recognized on the list at #10 (with his brother Josh being recognized at #68). In 2025, he was ranked #12 (with Josh ranked at #37).
