= Josh Kraft =

American nonprofit executive (born 1967)

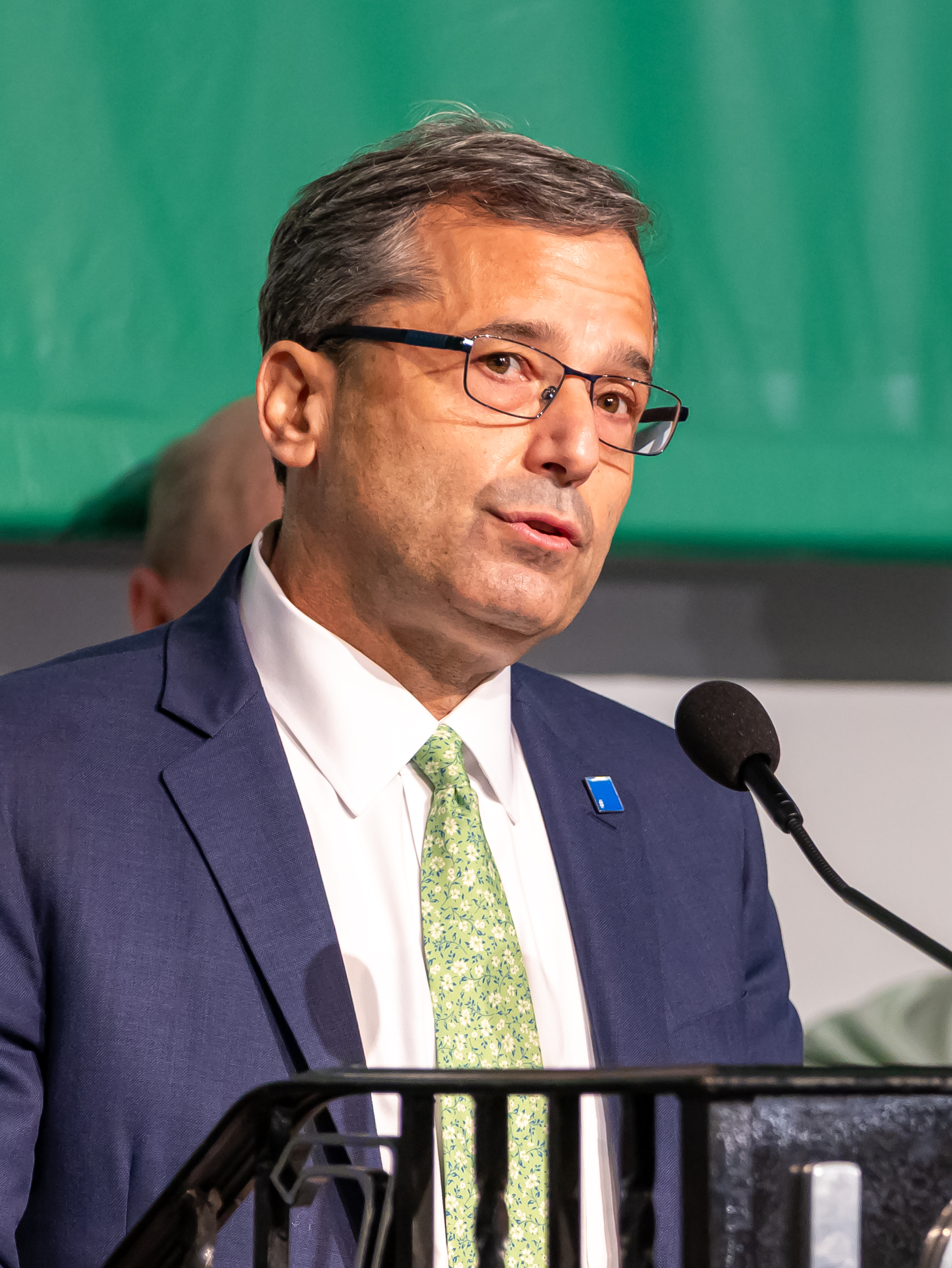
- Kraft in 2025
- Born: Joshua Kraft; April 11, 1967 (age 59)
- Education: Williams College (BA); Harvard University (MEd)
- Political party: Democratic
- Children: 2
- Parents: Robert Kraft (father); Myra Hiatt (mother)
- Relatives: Daniel Kraft (brother); Jonathan Kraft (brother); Jacob Hiatt (grandfather)

Joshua Kraft (born April 11, 1967) is an American nonprofit executive who is the head of Kraft Family Philanthropies and board chairman of the National Urban League's Eastern Massachusetts chapter. Kraft previously worked for 12 years as CEO of the Boys & Girls Club's Boston chapter. Kraft is a son of Robert Kraft, owner of the New England Patriots NFL team.

In the early 1990s, Kraft began working at the Boys & Girls Club of Boston. From 2008 until 2020, he headed the organization as its chief executive officer. In 2020, he became the head of Kraft Family Charities. In 2024, Kraft additionally became the board chairman of the Eastern Massachusetts chapter of the National Urban League.

Kraft ran for mayor of Boston in 2025, spending a record amount of money on a primary campaign. Kraft came in second in the primary, trailing incumbent mayor Michelle Wu by 49 percentage points. His second-place finish qualified him to face Wu on the general election ballot. However, two days after the primary, Kraft announced he would withdraw from the election.

== Family and education ==
Kraft is the third-born of four boys. His brothers are Jonathan, Daniel, and David. His parents are Robert Kraft and the late Myra Kraft. Myra died of ovarian cancer in July 2011. The Kraft family are Jewish. Kraft's father is a billionaire, being the CEO of the Kraft Group and owner of the New England Patriots of the National Football League. Josh is believed to be one of the future heirs of his father's fortune. In a 2008 profile, Mary Moore of Boston Business Journal idiomatically described his upbringing as having included "silver-spoon comforts" by virtue of his family wealth.

Kraft attended high school at the Rivers School, graduating in 1985. Kraft received his bachelor's degree from Williams College, graduating in 1989. He received his master's degree in education and social policy from the Harvard Graduate School of Education.

== Nonprofit management career ==
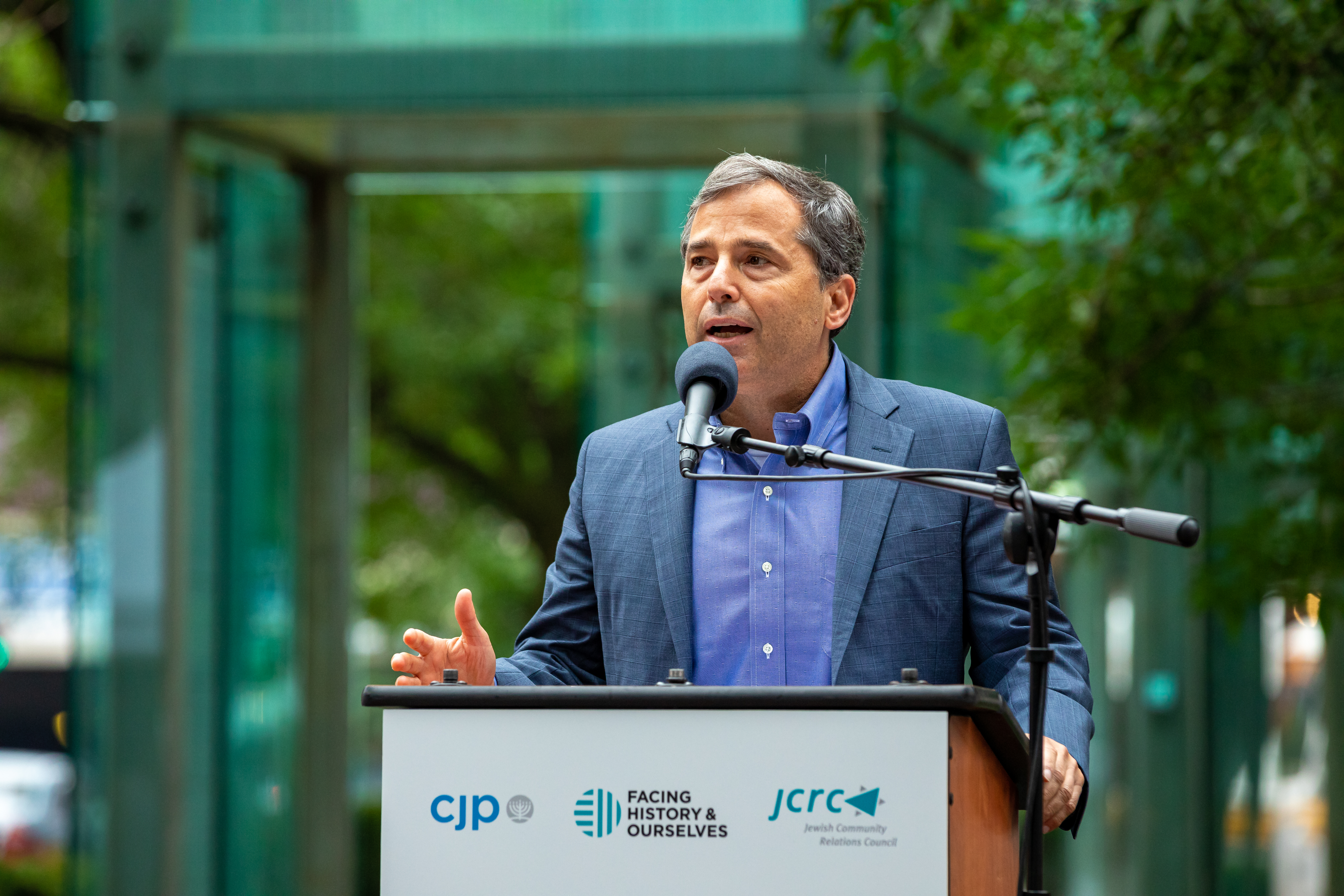
Kraft speaking in 2021

Kraft has had an extensive career as an executive at nonprofit organizations. Kraft is considered a well-recognized figure in the city of Boston, both due to his work at nonprofits and his status as a scion of a wealthy and high-profile family. He is the only one among his siblings not to work for the for-profit business side of the Kraft family enterprises.

=== Boys & Girls Club of Boston ===
Kraft spent 30 years working at the Boys & Girls Club of Boston. It has been varyingly reported that he either began as head of the organization's South Boston youth outreach program, or that he began in 1990 as the program coordinator at what is today known as the Edgerley Family South Boston Club. In 1993, Kraft established the organization's branch in Chelsea, Massachusetts (the Jordan Boys & Girls Club) and was that branch's executive director until 2008. In a 2008 profile written after Kraft was elevated to an executive position at Boys & Girls Club of Boston, Mary Moore of Boston Business Journal idiomatically described Kraft as having "traded silver-spoon comforts for passion and street savvy" in his work with this branch of the Boys & Girls Club, and as having "earned him both popularity and respect" from members of the branch. She also described him as, "the rare nonprofit leader whose raw enthusiasm for the organization’s mission comes from so many years spent at its grassroots level."

Kraft became president and chief operating officer (CEO) of the Boys & Girls Club of Boston in July 2008, a role he held for twelve years. As CEO, he led a $132 million fundraising campaign. He stepped down as head of the organization in 2020.

=== Kraft Family Philanthropies ===
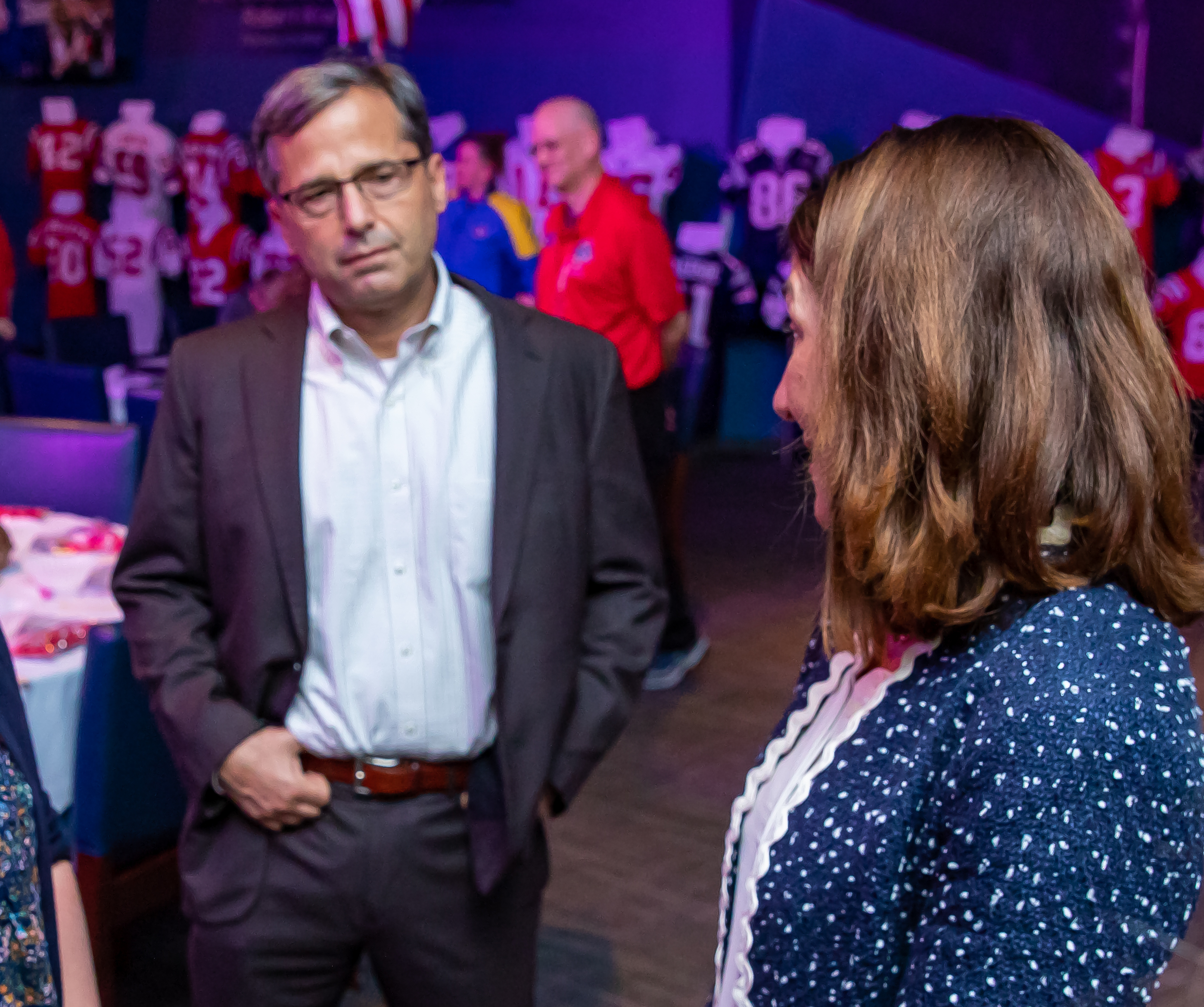
Kraft with Massachusetts Lieutenant Governor Karyn Polito in 2021

After leaving the Boys & Girls Club of Boston, Kraft became the head of Kraft Family Philanthropies. The organization consists of several primary subsidiaries: the Kraft Family Foundation, the Patriots Foundation (team charity of New England Patriots NFL team owned by his father), the Revolution Foundation (the team charity of the New England Revolution MLS team owned by his father), the Kraft Center for Community Health, and the Foundation to Combat Anti-Semitism. The organization also manages the Kraft family's involvement in the Reform Alliance. In this role, he regularly distributes millions of dollars of his family's wealth annually to various causes.

Kraft partnered the organization with the Massachusetts Military Support Foundation to provide meals to veterans and their families.

=== National Urban League of Eastern Massachusetts ===
In February 2024, Kraft was appointed by the board of the National Urban League of Eastern Massachusetts to be its chairman, with Kraft succeeding outgoing chairman Joseph Feaster Jr. Kraft had been in active consideration by the board for the position over several preceding months before being officially chosen.

=== Other work ===
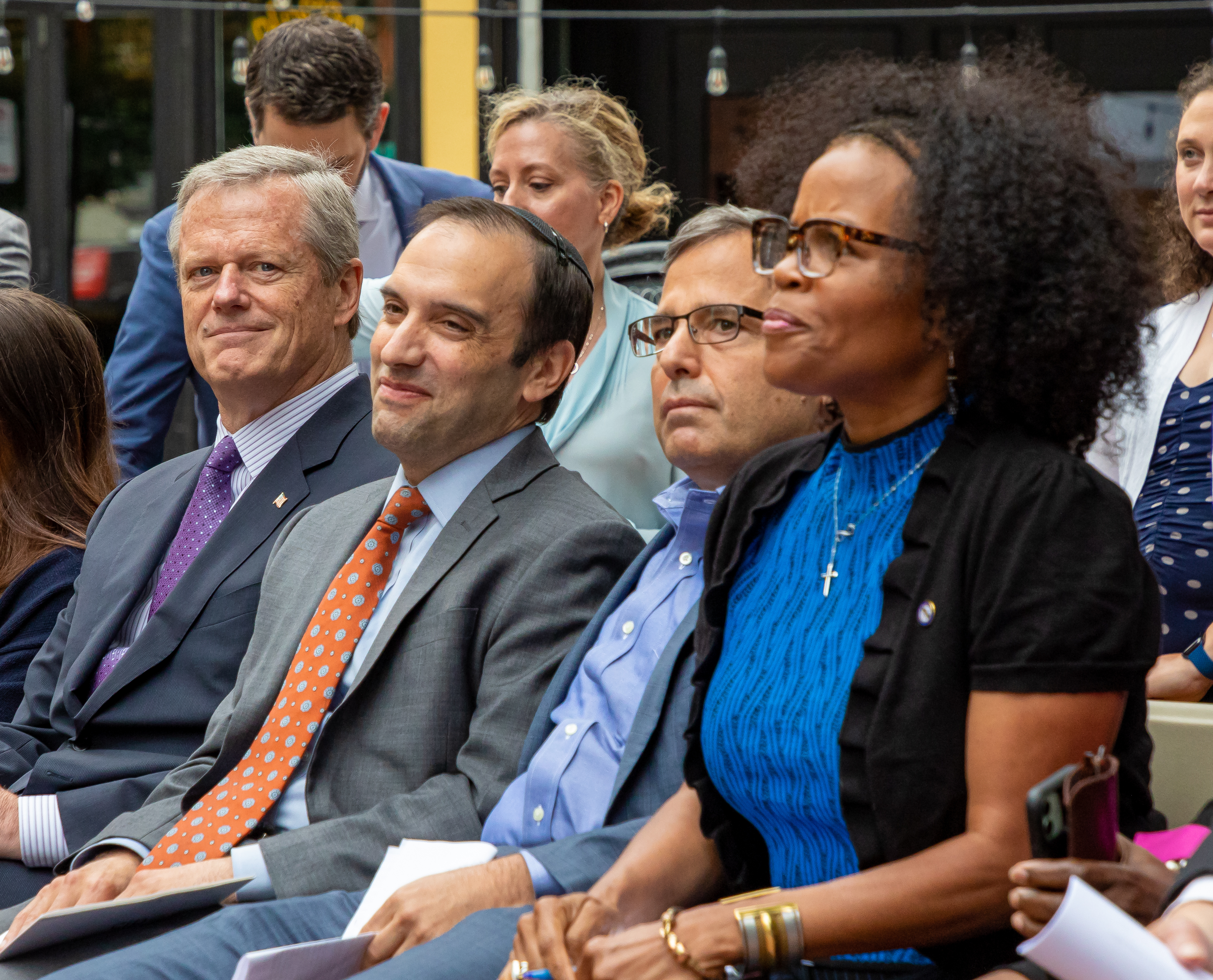
Kraft (second from right) sits with Massachusetts Governor Charlie Baker, Rabbi Marc Baker, and Acting Boston Mayor Kim Janey in 2021

During the governorships of Charlie Baker and Maura Healey, Kraft was co-chair of the governor's task force on hate crimes.

Kraft is on the board of overseers of Lasell University. In 2018, Kraft was elected to the board of trustees of Brandeis University.

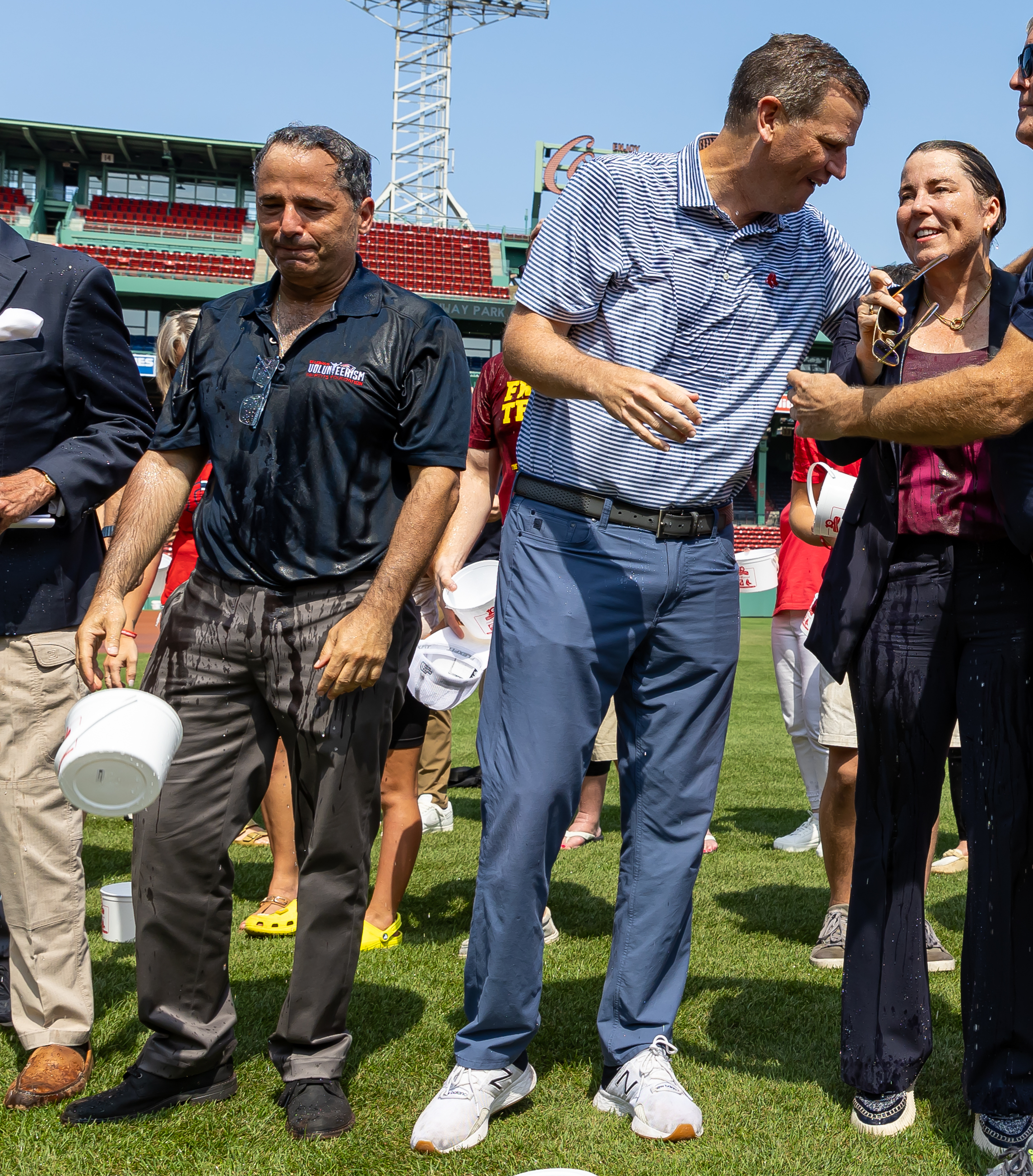
Kraft (far left) standing next to Boston Red Sox baseball executive Sam Kennedy and Massachusetts governor Maura Healey while participating in a 2024 event commemorating the tenth anniversary of the ALS Ice Bucket Challenge

Kraft also is on the board of trustees for Brigham and Women's Hospital. He is also on the boards of Beaver Country Day School, Camp Harbor View Foundation, Harvard Pilgrim Health Care Foundation, Rivers School, and the Museum of Science.

As of 2023, Kraft was teaching a course at Suffolk University on nonprofit management.

== Politics ==
=== Political donations ===
In 2021, Kraft gave $150,000 to Democratic Majority for Israel.

At the federal level, Kraft has given sizable personal donations to House and Senate candidates of both the Democratic and Republican parties.

Kraft donated to the political campaign operation of former Massachusetts governor Charlie Baker (a Republican). Kraft has also given to several Democrats in Massachusetts. Massachusetts Democrats that Kraft has given campaign contributions to have included state attorney general Andrea Campbell, state senator Christopher Worrell, and Suffolk County district attorney Kevin Hayden.

Ahead of the 2021 Boston mayoral election, Kraft gave $1,000 to the campaign of Michelle Wu. During the 2023 Boston City Council election, Kraft donated to a slate of candidates that had been prominently backed by New Balance CEO, major Republican donor, and Trump supporter Jim Davis. This slate of candidates were running as challengers to candidates supported by Wu. This was unsuccessful, as all of the candidates that Wu had endorsed won election.

=== 2025 Boston mayoral campaign ===
After Charlie Baker declined to seek reelection in 2022, Kraft was seen as a potential candidate for governor. There was also speculation that Kraft might challenge incumbent U.S. congresswoman Ayanna Pressley in the 2024 Democratic primary for Massachusetts's 7th congressional district. He was perceived to be more politically centrist than Pressley. However, Kraft denied having an interest in running for the congressional seat. Kraft publicly expressed an openness to running for political office. Kraft for years was seen as a possible candidate to challenge incumbent mayor Michelle Wu in the 2025 Boston mayoral election.

On February 4, 2025, Kraft launched his campaign to become mayor of Boston. During his speech where he announced his candidacy, he heavily criticized Michelle Wu, saying that she had not fulfilled campaign promises to make the MBTA free for residents of Boston, enact rent control and implement a municipal Green New Deal in the Boston Public Schools system. Kraft has voiced opposition to expanding bike lanes downtown, saying that if elected he would put an "immediate pause" on bike lane construction, and that "Centre Street [in West Roxbury] could be one of the bike lanes we remove." Kraft raised $6.8 million for his campaign prior to the preliminary round vote, a record amount. However, $5.5 million of what Kraft raised came from his own personal wealth and only $1.3 came from sources and contributors other than Kraft himself (primarily wealthy donors, including Boston business leaders).

In July 2025, Kraft's campaign sent out a series of fundraising emails purportedly from prominent Democratic politicians, including Sen. Adam Schiff (CA), Rep. Eric Swalwell (CA), Rep. Jasmine Crockett (TX), former governor Roy Cooper (NC), and retired brigadier general Shawn Harris (GA), which were not approved by the identified politicians. Wu campaign treasurer Robert Binney called on the state Office of Campaign and Political Finance to investigate, saying "at best these practices are highly deceptive and negligent, at worst they are illegal violations of our state campaign finance laws." Kraft campaign spokesperson Eileen O'Connor stated in response that the unauthorized emails were "an error on the part of our vendor."

Kraft came in second in the primary, trailing incumbent mayor Michelle Wu by 49 percentage points. His second-place finish qualified him to face Wu on the general election ballot. However, two days after the primary, Kraft announced he would withdraw from the election.

== Personal life ==
Kraft spent much of his life residing in Newton, Massachusetts. Up until at least 2023, Kraft lived in Chestnut Hill, Massachusetts. In 2023, a limited liability company purchased a $2 million condo in the North End neighborhood of Boston where Kraft moved to with his partner Michelle Perez Vichot.

Kraft is divorced, and has two adult daughters.

In 2023, Kraft revealed that he had been diagnosed with and treated for prostate cancer in 2018. He mentioned that it had been detected early, and that he was currently testing at levels that indicate his cancer is essentially gone.

== Awards and honors received ==
- Williams College "Bicentennial Medal" (2010)
- Rivers School "Alumni Excellence Award" (2014)
- Greater Boston PFLAG "Cornerstone of Equality Award" (2017)
- The Salvation Army Massachusetts Division "Others Award" (2022)

Kraft was the commencement speaker at Nichols College's spring 2023 commencement ceremony, where he was given an honorary doctorate in Humane Letters. The Boys & Girls Club of Boston has named one of its facilities the "Josh Kraft Mattapan Teen Center".

In 2023, Boston magazine ranked Kraft and his brothers Daniel and Jonathan at number 11 on its annual list of the "most influential Bostonians", grouping these three Kraft brothers as a single entity. In 2024, the magazine included Kraft and his brother Jonathan as separate entries the list, ranking Josh Kraft at No. 68 and Jonathan Kraft at No. 10. In 2025, Josh Kraft was ranked at No. 37 on the list, and his brother Jonathan was ranked at No. 12.
