= Myra Kraft =

American philanthropist (1942–2011)

- Born: Myra Nathalie Hiatt; December 27, 1942; Worcester, Massachusetts, U.S.
- Died: July 20, 2011 (aged 68); Brookline, Massachusetts, U.S.
- Education: Brandeis University (BA)
- Spouse: Robert Kraft (m. 1963)
- Children: 4 (Daniel, David, Jonathan, Josh)
- Parent(s): Jacob Hiatt; Frances Hiatt

Myra Hiatt Kraft (née Myra Nathalie Hiatt; December 27, 1942 – July 20, 2011) was an American philanthropist and the wife of New England Patriots and New England Revolution owner Robert Kraft.

== Early life and education ==
Kraft was born in Worcester, Massachusetts in 1942, the daughter of Frances (Lavine) and Jacob Hiatt. Her father was a Lithuanian Jewish immigrant who had served as a circuit judge of the Court of Lithuania before immigrating in 1935. His parents and three other members of his family were murdered during the Holocaust. He went on to become a well-known philanthropist and leader in the Jewish community. Jacob served as president of the E.F. Dodge Paper Box Corp. in Leominster, Massachusetts and remained president when it merged with 12 other box and printing companies to become the Rand-Whitney Corp. Rand-Whitney was bought by his son-in-law, Robert Kraft, in 1972.

In 1960, Kraft graduated from the private Bancroft School in Worcester, and in 1964 she graduated from Brandeis University with a degree in History.

== Philanthropy ==
Kraft was listed by Boston Magazine as one of the 20 Most Powerful Women in Boston, She was president and director of the New England Patriots Charitable Foundation and trustee of the Robert K. and Myra H. Kraft Foundation. She served on the boards of directors of the American Repertory Theatre, the United Way of Massachusetts Bay, Northeastern University, the Boys and Girls Clubs of Boston, the Jewish Book Council, and Brandeis University.

2006 - Honorary Fellow of the Ruppin Academic Center

Kraft and her husband started the "Passport to Israel" Program with the Combined Jewish Philanthropies of Boston which provided financial assistance to Jewish parents to send their children to Israel while teenagers to help promote Jewish identity. To encourage greater understanding between Christians and Jews, Kraft, her husband, and her father endowed two professorships in comparative religion at the College of the Holy Cross and Brandeis University: the Kraft-Hiatt Chair in Judaic Studies at Holy Cross and the Kraft-Hiatt Chair in Christian Studies at Brandeis University.

The International Herald Tribune credited Kraft with "modeling a new form of engaged giving that is transforming the relationship between philanthropist and philanthropy," and the Boston Globe stated she was "forging a whole new form of engaged giving."

The Krafts have donated more than $100 million to a wide range of charities mostly focusing on education, athletics, women’s issues, and Israel.

== New England Patriots ==
Kraft was the president of the New England Patriots Charitable Foundation, the team's non-profit entity created by the Kraft family to support charitable and philanthropic agencies throughout the United States and Israel.

Shortly after the 1996 NFL draft, Kraft learned that the Patriots' fifth-round choice, Christian Peter of Nebraska, had a lengthy history of violence against women. At her insistence, coupled by backlash from women's groups and Patriots fans against Peter's signing, the Patriots relinquished Peter's rights only a week after the draft.

== Personal life ==
Kraft married Robert Kraft in June 1963 while she was a student at Brandeis. They have four sons:

- Jonathan A. Kraft is president of The Kraft Group and the New England Patriots.
- Daniel A. Kraft is president of International Forest Products founded in 1972 by his father.
- Joshua Kraft is the chair of Kraft Family Charities and the former president and CEO of the Boys & Girls Clubs of Boston.
- David Kraft

== Death ==
Kraft died from ovarian cancer on July 20, 2011, at age 68, in her Brookline, Massachusetts, home. Public services were held at Temple Emanuel in Newton, Massachusetts. In her memory, all Patriots players wore a patch on their uniforms bearing Kraft's initials (MHK) throughout the 2011 season.
