= Patriot Place =

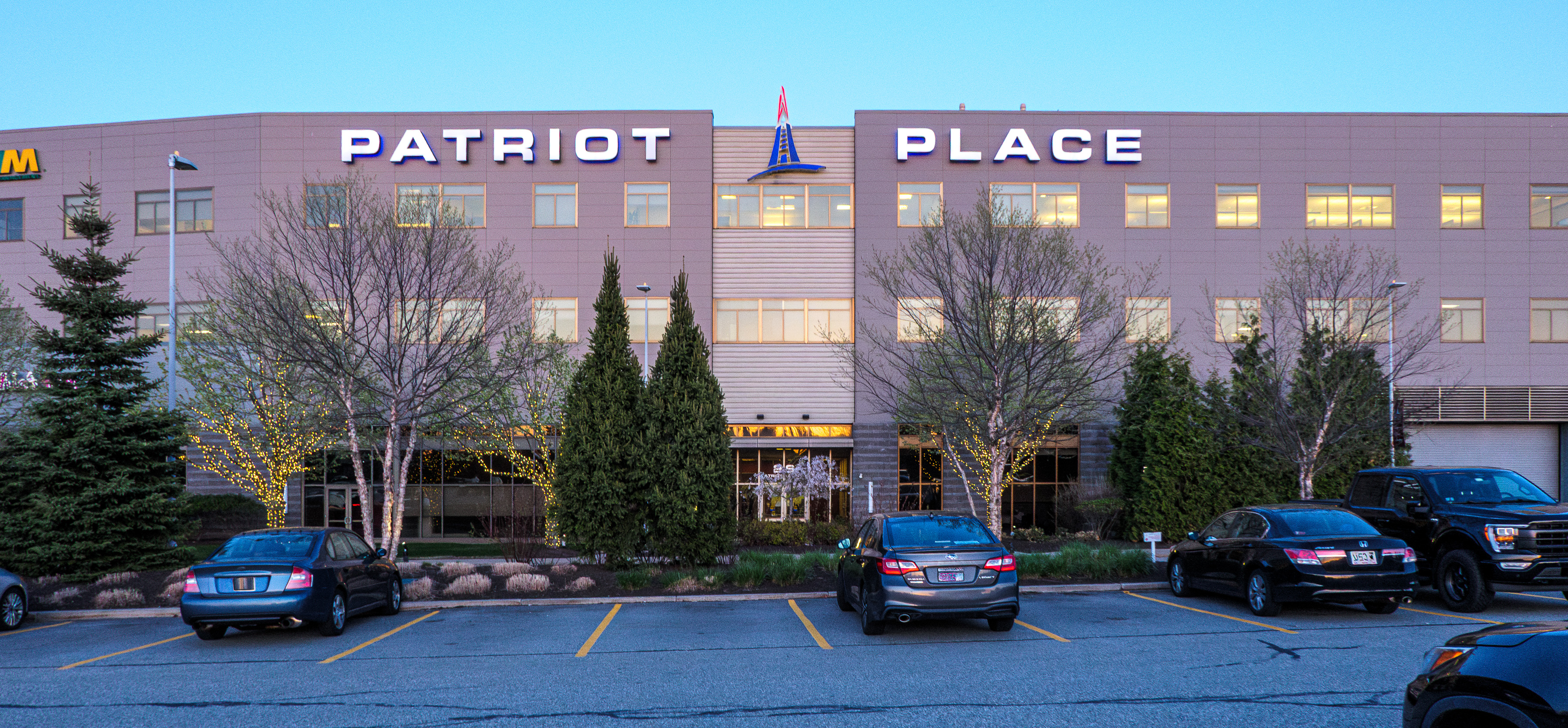
- Location: Foxborough, Massachusetts, U.S.
- Coordinates: 42°05′31″N 71°16′02″W
- Address: 2 Patriot Place
- Opened: Fall 2007
- Owner: The Kraft Group
- Floor area: over 1,300,000 ft^{2} (120,000 m^{2})
- Floors: 1 (2 in former Showcase Cinemas de Lux)
- Public transit: MBTA Foxboro station
- Website: patriot-place.com

Patriot Place

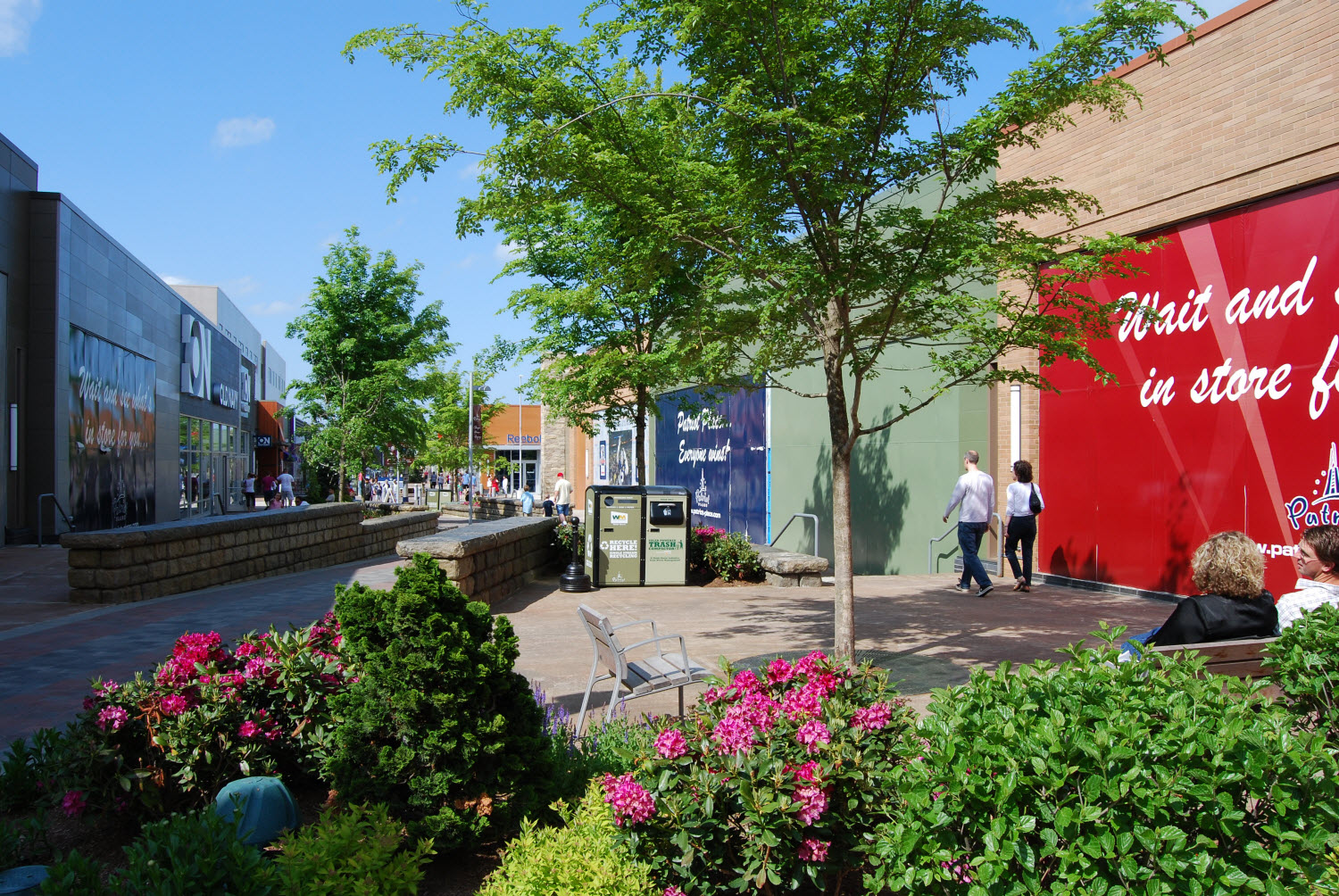
Shops

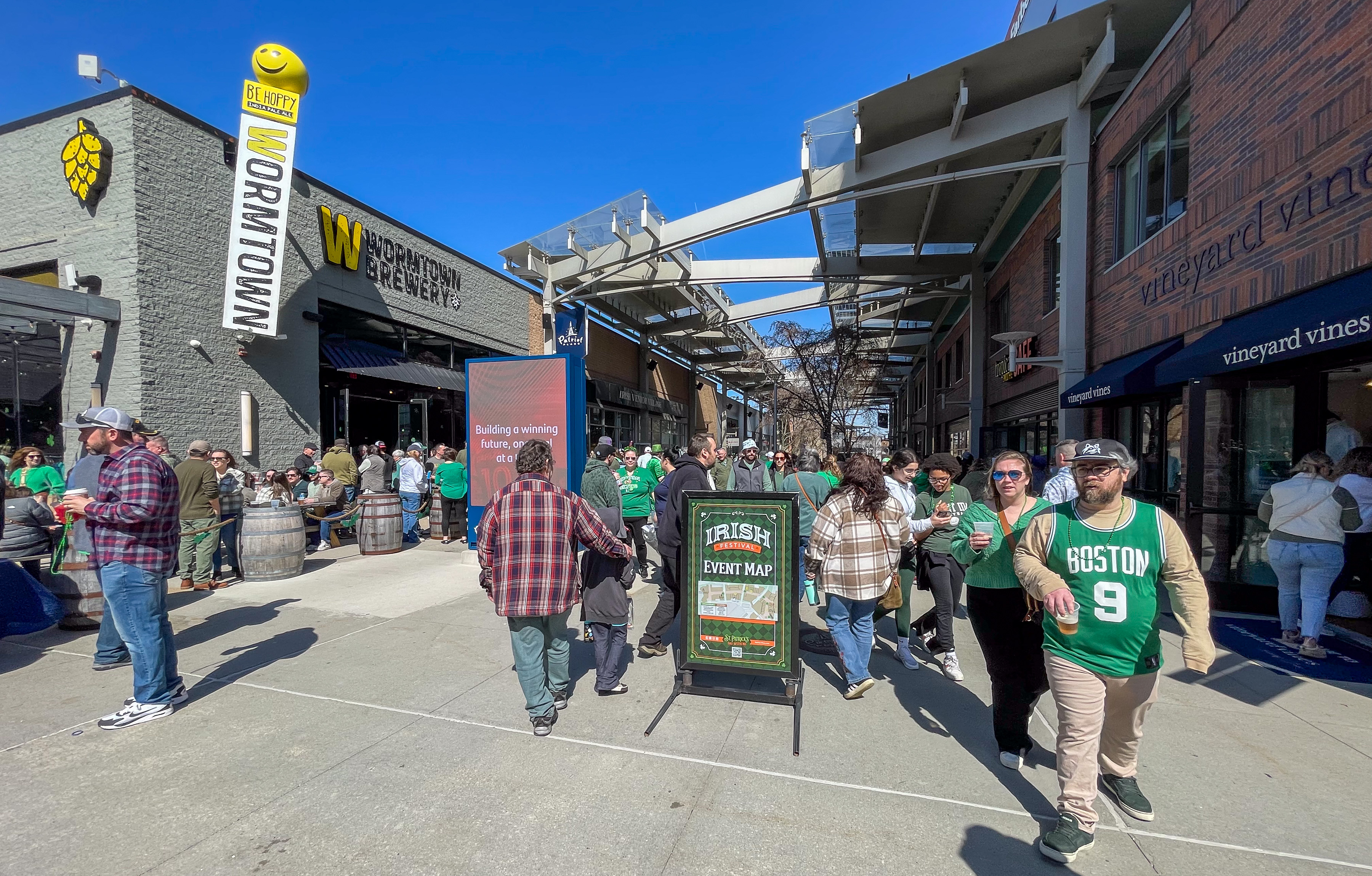
Events

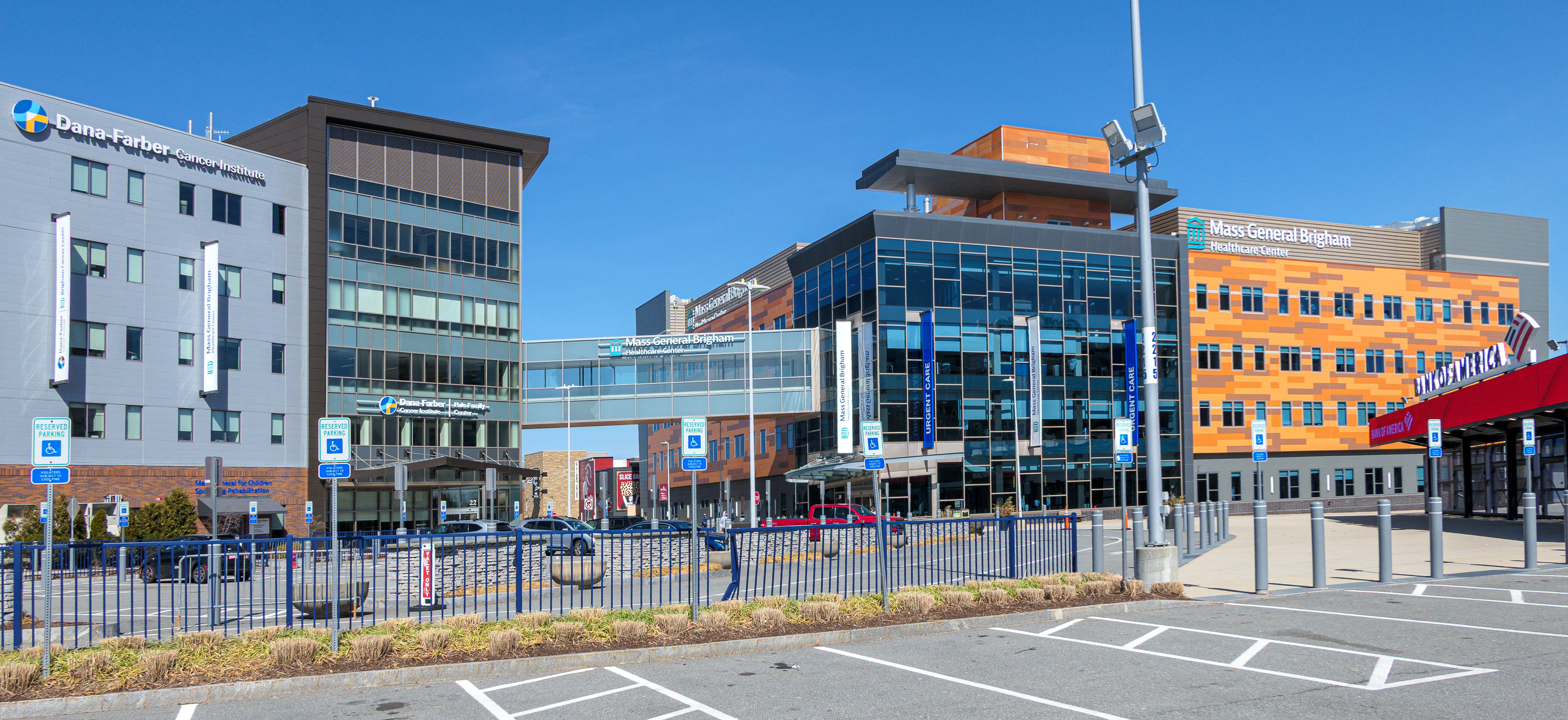
Health Care Center

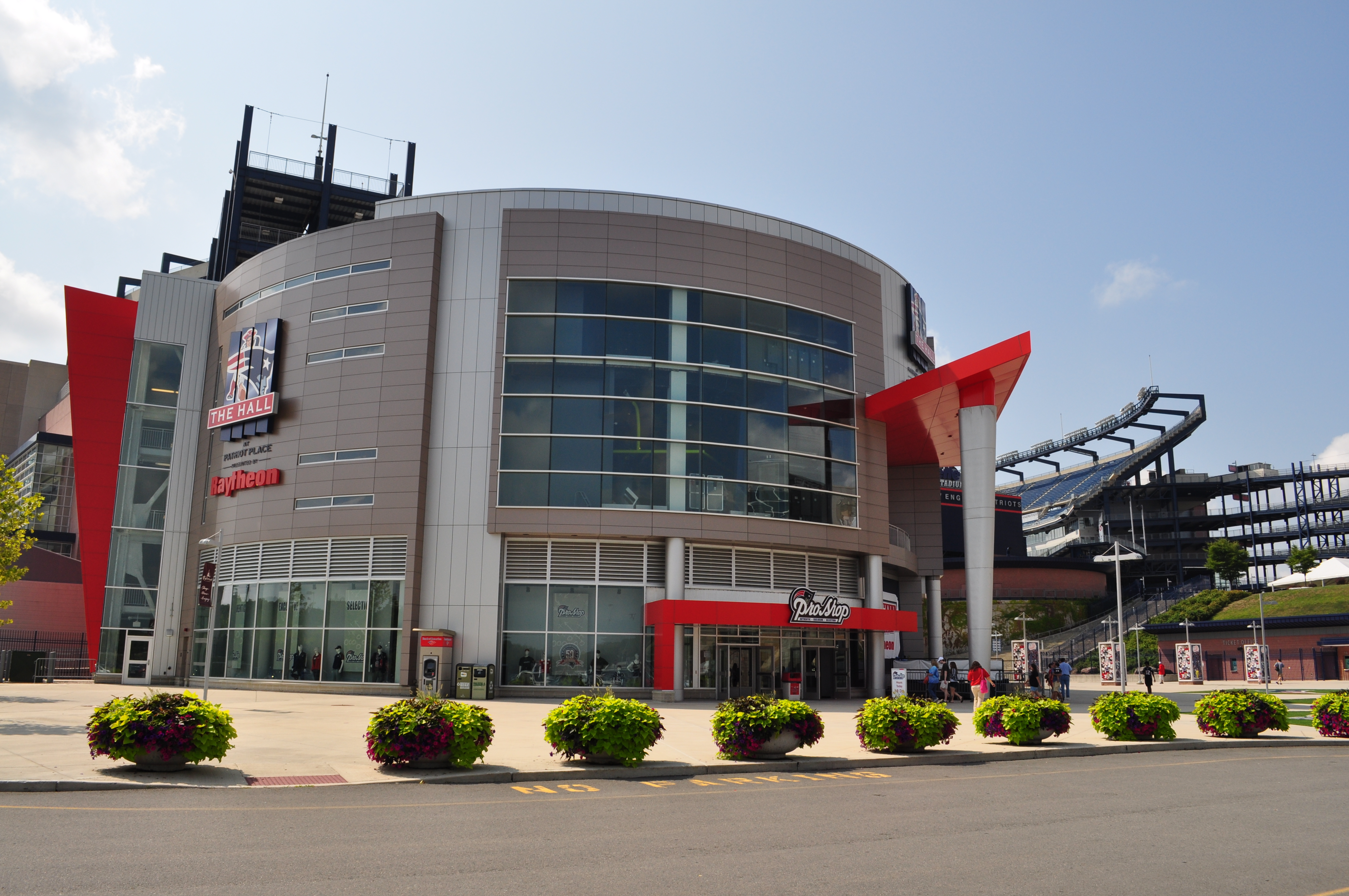
Patriots Hall of Fame

Patriot Place is an open-air shopping center owned by The Kraft Group built around Gillette Stadium, the home of the New England Patriots and New England Revolution. It is located in Foxborough, Massachusetts.

The first phase opened in late 2007, which included the construction of a small strip mall. The second phase is built on what were parking lots for Gillette Stadium, which in turn were previously the site of the now-demolished Foxboro Stadium. Phase two of Patriot Place was also home to one of the first locations for Showcase Cinemas' Cinema de Lux brand.

== Tenants ==
Bass Pro Shops built their first New England location at the Patriot Place; it was among the first stores to be announced and opened in the complex. It includes an animatronic shooting range and overlooks a small swamp that was once part of a larger one that the store was built over with land reclamation. Many events are held there as well.

Patriot Place has various restaurants. One of which was CBS Sporting Club, originally known as CBS Scene, which opened in 2008, later renovating into its final form in 2018, featuring American cuisine. Around the complex are over 125 HDTVs showing games by the Patriots, as well as classic programs once shown on CBS. The restaurant shut down after the 2022 season on January 8, 2023.

Cinema de Lux was launched by Showcase Cinemas with a location at the complex. It was aimed more upmarket with an American-style restaurant and a live music venture known as Showcase Live. The theater had 14 screens, with also a bar and restaurant inside. However, it closed on January 10, 2026. Phoenix Theatres then announced plans to take over the former theater which would later open in summer 2026.

The Brigham and Women's/Mass General Health Care Center is a four-story outpatient health care center and a joint venture between Brigham and Women's Hospital and Massachusetts General Hospital, both located in Boston.

Renaissance Hotel is a four-star hotel.

== Events ==
Patriots Place is a setting for various events. There are live music performances from May to October on the outdoor Dean College stage. Since 2010 it has held an annual Irish Festival for Saint Patrick's Day.

On February 25, 2025, Patriot Place's sign experienced an incident where it began showing images related to the gay portion of the Furry subculture, including among others an image featuring the controversial "Boykisser" character, a viral exploitable meme that emerged in early 2023. It's unclear how long the incident lasted other than being resolved within the day, and it is unclear to what extent the incident was unauthorized, as a spokesperson for Patriot Place declined to comment.

== Patriots Hall of Fame ==
Opened in September 2008, the Patriots Hall of Fame presented by RTX is a museum that includes the New England Patriots Hall of Fame and displays the history of the New England Patriots – including historical wins and losses, memorabilia, the game-worn uniforms and equipment of famous players such as Tom Brady, Rob Gronkowski, Wes Welker, Julian Edelman, Ty Law, Willie McGinest, Randy Moss, Rodney Harrison, John Hannah, Mike Haynes, and Andre Tippett, the six Super Bowl trophies among other trophies and awards, such as the numerous Lamar Hunt trophies. The statue of Tom Brady is located near the entrance to the Hall of Fame.

== Public transportation ==
Patriot Place, in collaboration with the MBTA and MassDOT, helped establish permanent weekday MBTA Commuter Rail service to Foxboro Station adjacent to the shopping complex. After a successful pilot program beginning in September 2022, the service became permanent on October 2, 2023, offering 11 inbound and 10 outbound round‑trips during peak weekday commute periods.

== See also ==
- American Dream (shopping mall)
- Titletown District
