= Jacob Hiatt =

Lithuanian-American philanthropist (1908–2001)

- Born: July 1, 1908; Russian Empire
- Died: February 25, 2001 (aged 92); Worcester, Massachusetts, U.S.
- Resting place: Bnai Brith Lodge Cemetery, Worcester, Massachusetts, U.S.
- Education: University of Lithuania
- Occupations: Businessman, philanthropist
- Spouse: Frances Hiatt
- Children: 2 daughters, including Myra Kraft
- Relatives: Robert Kraft (son-in-law); Daniel Kraft (grandson); Jonathan Kraft (grandson); Josh Kraft (grandson)

Jacob "Jack" Hiatt (July 1, 1908 – February 25, 2001) was a Lithuanian-American businessman and philanthropist.

== Early life ==
Hiatt was born to a Jewish family in the Russian Empire in 1908, the son of Joshua and Leah Hiatt. He earned a bachelor's degree from the University of Lithuania and became a district attorney and circuit judge.

In 1935 he immigrated to the United States, settling in Worcester, Massachusetts, where two of his brothers, Alexander and Sidney, lived. Although he was fluent in Lithuanian, Hebrew, Russian, and German, Hiatt did not speak English when he arrived in the U.S. Frances Lavine, the secretary to the Worcester superintendent of schools, helped find him a school that taught English to immigrants. They married in 1937. In 1946 he earned a master's degree from Clark University.

== Personal life ==
Hiatt and his wife had two children, Myra and Janice. In 1963, Myra married Robert Kraft. Hiatt's younger daughter, Janice, is intellectually disabled. His wife, Frances Hiatt, died in 1980.

== Business career ==
After arriving in the United States, Hiatt worked at his brother Alexander's shoe manufacturing company, where he made boxes. He later went to work for E.F. Dodge Paper Box Corp. in Leominster, Massachusetts, where he eventually rose to the position of company president. The company was later acquired by Whitney Box to form Dodge-Whitney Co. In February 1962, Dodge-Whitney and three other companies merged to create the Rand-Whitney Corporation. Hiatt remained in charge of Rand-Whitney until 1968, when his son-in-law, Robert Kraft, purchased half of the company in a leveraged buyout.

Hiatt was also president of Estey Investment Inc. and the Jacob Hiatt Income Trust and was an investor in the Educator Biscuit Co.

== Philanthropy ==
=== Jewish causes ===
Hiatt's parents, a brother, and his sisters were killed in the Holocaust. After World War II, Hiatt traveled to Europe, where he saw concentration camps, visited the Displaced persons camps where refugees of the Holocaust lived, and had an audience with Pope Pius XII. He then travelled to see the emerging Jewish state of Israel. After he returned home, Hiatt became a supporter of the establishment of the state of Israel as well as the cause of Holocaust victims.

In 1960, Hiatt was appointed to the Board of Directors of the North American Division of the World Jewish Congress.

After the death of his wife in 1980, Hiatt purchased a square block of land in Jerusalem for the creation of a park in her memory.

Hiatt gave $1 million to expand and renovate the Jewish Community Center in Worcester (now known as the Frances and Jacob Hiatt Jewish Community Center).

Hiatt was also an honorary life trustee of Temple Emanuel in Worcester and a member of the management committee of the Jewish Home for the Aged, also in Worcester.

=== Brandeis University ===
In 1962, Hiatt was appointed to Brandeis University's Board of Directors. In 1971, he succeeded Lawrence Wien as the chairman of the board. He later became chairman of the university's investment committee.

Hiatt financed Brandeis' Jacob Hiatt Institute. The institute, located in Israel, was established in 1960 to allow students to study Israel's social and political institutions, contemporary Hebrew, and Israeli and Jewish history in the county. He also established the Frances L. Hiatt Career Development Program.

=== Clark University ===
Hiatt served as a trustee of his alma mater, Clark University. In 1962, he gave the school $250,000 to establish a chair in European history. In 1990, he donated $7.5 million to establish the Jacob Hiatt Center for Urban Education. The center was created to allow Clark faculty and Worcester public school teachers to work together on ways to improve public education, with an emphasis on issues related to the increased ethnic diversity of students. The donation was the largest in the university's history. In 1989, he also gave a large endowment to name the university's Frances L. Hiatt School of Psychology.

=== College of the Holy Cross ===
In 1969, Hiatt was appointed to the College of the Holy Cross' Board of Directors. He remained on the board for over twenty years and also served on the President's Council.

In 1990, Hiatt, his daughter Myra, and his son-in-law Robert Kraft financed an endowed chair in Judaic studies at Holy Cross, along with an endowed chair in Christian studies at Brandeis as part of a program that involved joint academic activities in comparative religion. He also provided funding for a wing of the Holy Cross library, named after his parents, that is devoted to Holocaust studies.

=== Worcester public schools ===
In 1981 Hiatt established the Frances Hiatt Off Campus Program, which allowed high school students to take courses at Clark University, Holy Cross, Worcester State University, and Assumption College. In 1983, Hiatt created the Frances Hiatt Scholars Program, which provided $5 million over ten years to Worcester high school and nursing school students. In 1990, Worcester Public Schools opened up an elementary school named after Hiatt - Jacob Hiatt Magnet School on Main Street. He later established the Frances Hiatt Exemplary School Program, which provided Worcester's elementary schools with $4,000 to $7,000 a year for educational purposes.

=== Worcester Art Museum ===
In 1971, Hiatt joined the board of directors of the Worcester Art Museum. The museum's Frances L. Hiatt Wing was named in memory of Hiatt's wife. He provided money for the creation of the Frances Hiatt Scholarships at the Worcester Art Museum and the Hiatt FAME (Fund for the Advancement of Museum Education).

=== Other works ===
Hiatt was a trustee of Boston University, Leicester Junior College, Hebrew Union College, Worcester City Hospital, the Worcester Jewish Federation, and the Worcester chapter of the American Red Cross as well as a member of the Council of the American Antiquarian Society and board of trustees of the American Jewish Historical Society. Hiatt endowed the Frances Hiatt fellowships at the American Antiquarian Society.

== Death ==
Hiatt died on February 25, 2001, at his home in Worcester.
