= Blue Square Alliance Against Hate =

Charitable 501(c)3 organization to fight antisemitism (founded 2019)

- Formation: 2019
- Founder: Robert Kraft
- Legal status: 501(c)(3) non-profit
- Headquarters: Gillette Stadium
- President: Adam Katz
- Website: bluesquarealliance.org
- Formerly called: Foundation to Combat Antisemitism

The Blue Square Alliance Against Hate, formerly the Foundation to Combat Antisemitism (FCAS), was founded in 2019 to address a "rising tide of Jewish hate and all hate in America".

The nonprofit's mission is to inspire unengaged non-Jewish Americans "to become active allies in the fight against hate through a fact-based, non-confrontational, and actionable approach that addresses the root cause of Jewish hate and all hate at scale".

Blue Square Alliance Against Hate is a registered 501(c)(3) non-profit organization.

== History ==
The organization was founded by Robert Kraft, the owner of the NFL's New England Patriots among other sports and non-sports holdings.

Kraft received Israel's Genesis Prize, which "honors living Jewish individuals who have attained international renown in their chosen professional fields, are proud of their Jewish heritage, care about the future of the Jewish people and the State of Israel, and inspire young people to make the world a better place", on June 20, 2019. During the ceremony, Kraft pledged $20 million to establish a foundation that would fight antisemitism and combat the Palestinian-led Boycott, Divestment, and Sanctions (BDS) movement against Israel.

In 2025 the Foundation renamed itself the Blue Square Alliance Against Hate and named Adam Katz as president.

In 2026, the organization announced its first board of advisors: former US Secretary of State Condoleezza Rice; Bank of America CEO Brian Moynihan; Dentons CEO Kate Barton; Salesforce CEO Marc Benioff; and Warner Bros. CEO David Zaslav.

== #StandUpToJewishHate ==
The organization has run online ad campaigns launched to coincide with major football events when viewership is guaranteed to be high. In 2023, along with Blue Square's partner agency VML, they won two Cannes Lions Awards for both media/media planning and PR/PR effectiveness. In 2024, they won an Adage award. Blue Square has released ads at other times, however.

=== Ad campaigns ===
October 2022 — FCAS sponsored its first high-profile ad, encouraging people to denounce hate against Jews. The ad, titled "Stand Up to Jewish Hate", aired during NFL football games. This action came in response to antisemitic comments made by singer Kanye West and later basketball player Kyrie Irving. Kraft invested $25 million in the #StandUptoJewishHate campaign, and the foundation's executive director indicated that the ads would air during the NFL draft, NBA and NHL playoffs as well as by social media influencers.

January 2023 — FCAS launched its second major ad for its #StandUpToJewishHate campaign during the NFL New Year's Day Games.

October 2024 — FCAS launched the #TimeoutAgainstHate campaign, bringing together sports figures from the NBA, NFL, WNBA, MLB, NHL, MLS, and NASCAR, including Shaquille O'Neal, Candace Parker, and Doc Rivers on YouTube, along with LaVar Arrington, on Facebook.

February 2025 — For Super Bowl LIX, Blue Square ran an ad illustrating the stupidity of hate that ended with the message, "Stand Up to All Hate". Called "No Reason to Hate", the ad stars rapper Snoop Dogg and former football star Tom Brady.

February 2026 — Blue Square Alliance paid $15 million to air a commercial during Super Bowl LX, called "Sticky Note", featuring a student being bullied at school for being Jewish. The ad highlights the statistic, from an Anti-Defamation League survey, that 71% of Jewish teens, by 2024, had experienced antisemitism.

== Blue Squares ==
In 2023, the blue square campaign launched as a symbol of solidarity with victims of antisemitism.

== Reactions ==
In 2024, sports journalist Dave Zirin accused the foundation of being created by Kraft to conflate antisemitism with anti-zionism.
