= Decree 70/2023 =

2023 decree in Argentina

- Long title: Bases for the reconstruction of the Argentine economy
- Citation: Decree 70/2023
- Territorial extent: Argentina
- Signed by: Javier Milei
- Signed: 20 December 2023
- Status: In force

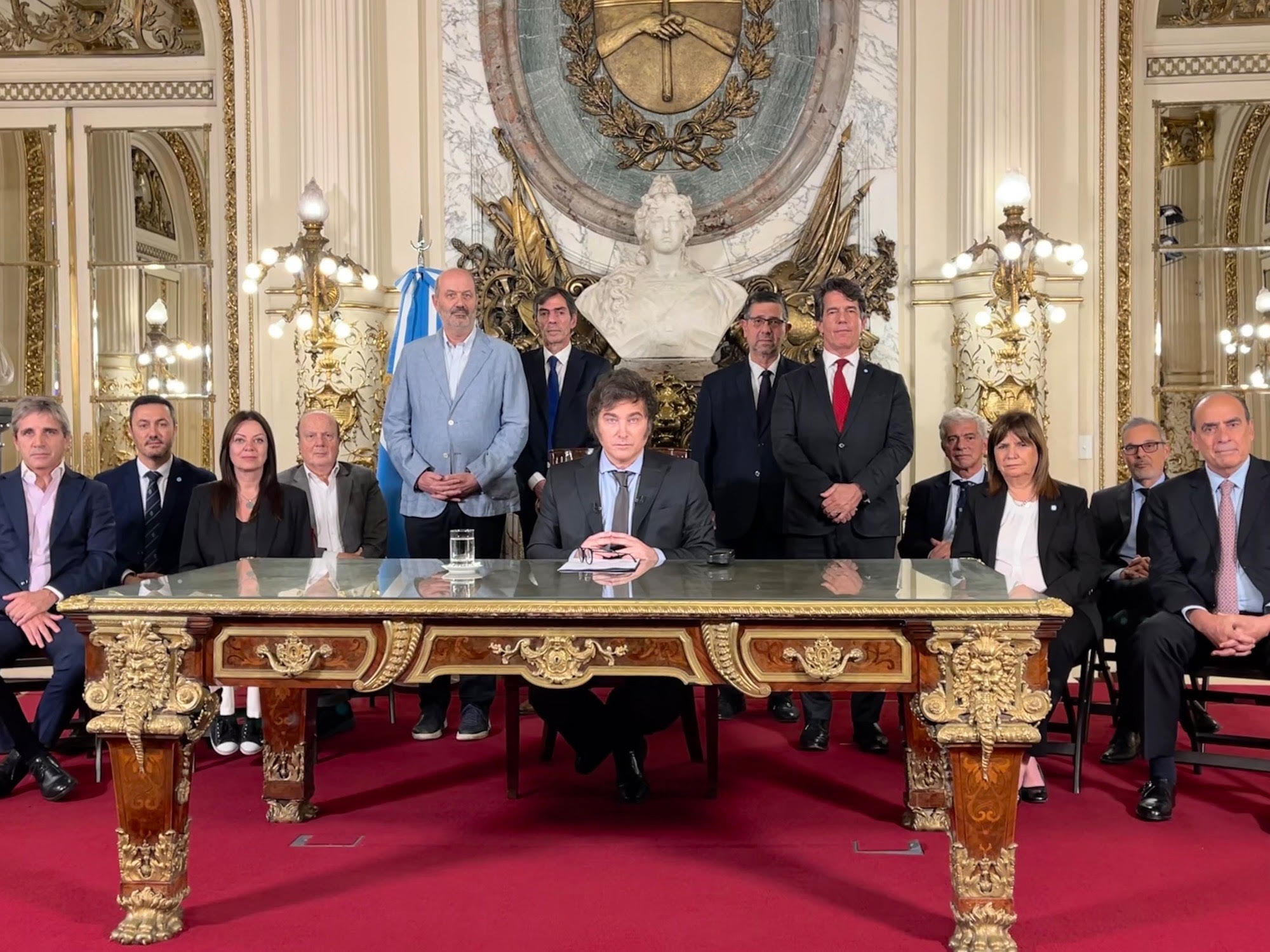
Milei and his cabinet announce the DNU in Cadena nacional.

Decree 70/2023, titled "Bases for the reconstruction of the Argentine economy" (Spanish: Bases para la reconstrucción de la economía argentina) was signed on 20 December 2023, by the Argentine president Javier Milei. It is known in the media as the "Megadecreto" ("Mega-decree") or "decretazo" for its large scope.

== Announcement ==
The initial idea was to announce the decree on 20 December 2023, at noon. It was meant to be a defining moment of the presidency of Javier Milei: many groups of piqueteros organized a large demonstration and the government intended to prevent it traffic obstruction (unlike most former governments, who allowed it), and the decree would set the bases of the economic plan. The announcement was moved to the night, at 21:00, and it was filed at the White Hall of the Casa Rosada. Milei would read a part of the decree, with his cabinet beside him. The full text of the decree was known the following day when it was formally published in the official bulletin.

== Contents ==
The decree, comprising 366 articles, changes or revokes existing laws and decrees, with the aim of 'deregulating' the Argentinian economy. Milei issued it as a Necessity and Urgency Decree (Decreto de Necesidad y Urgencia), allowing the president to change and revoke laws unilaterally in cases of justified national urgency, and can only be overturned if rejected by both houses of the Argentine Parliament. Several Argentine constitutional experts have raised concerns that this is a misuse of the form of decree.

=== Main points ===
The article 958 of the Civil Code of Argentina was made optional. In the original version of the law this article arranged that the terms of a contract would be decided by the parties, and a 2015 amendment added several regulations and procedures. The new change returns it to the original version.

State-owned enterprises would become Sociedades Anónimas, and have the same risks as regular enterprises, such as bankruptcy if poorly managed. It also allows to transfer shares from the state to the employees.

The decree made several changes to labour law. Compensations owed to terminated or laid off employees was reduced. Workers can freely choose their own healthcare providers, instead of having one assigned by their union. Permanent traffic obstructions against an organization, a common protest tactic by unions, were made illegal.

The decree also removes the registries of importers and exporters and authorizations associated with them, a radical departure from the previous situation whose exact implementation remains unclear. The declared aim of this change is the reduction paperwork and digitalization of authorization processes.

The decree abolishes rent control regulations and allows rent to be set in U.S. dollars, rather than pesos.

== Reactions ==
As a Necessity and Urgency Decree, the decree can be repealed if both houses of Congress reject it. The decree came into force during the summer recess of the Congress, which would only have the chance to consider it on 1 March 2024. This time gives Milei two months to negotiate its support with other parties in Congress, where La Libertad Avanza is in the minority. Many legislators are against it, with most Peronists opposing its content and most radicals opposing the procedure of using a decree instead of a regular bill. If the decree is rejected by the Congress, it would be the first case since their regulation in the 1994 amendment of the Constitution of Argentina.

The decree was denounced as unconstitutional by the "Asociación Civil Observatorio del Derecho a la Ciudad", led by the former head of the Central Bank Claudio Lozano, alongside unionists Hugo Godoy and Rodolfo Aguiar. They claim that the decree goes against the principle of the separation of powers. The case was assigned to judge Esteban Furnari, who accepted it as a collective case, which means that all files against the decree would be unified in that single case.

The General Confederation of Labour called for a general strike on 24 January, with secretary Héctor Daer referring to it as "illegal and unconstitutional". The strike resulted with businesses and institutions closed throughout Argentina, including the cancellation of hundreds of flights which stranded tens of thousands of passengers. Thousands protested outside of the Palace of the Argentine National Congress. According to The New York Times, the protests were "overwhelmingly peaceful".

== Voting ==
On 14 March, 2024, the Senate voted to overturn the decree. After eight hours of debate, 25 senators voted for the decree, 42 against it, 4 abstained and there was one absence. The Chamber of Deputies has not set a date yet for voting on the matter.
