= Javier Milei =

President of Argentina since 2023

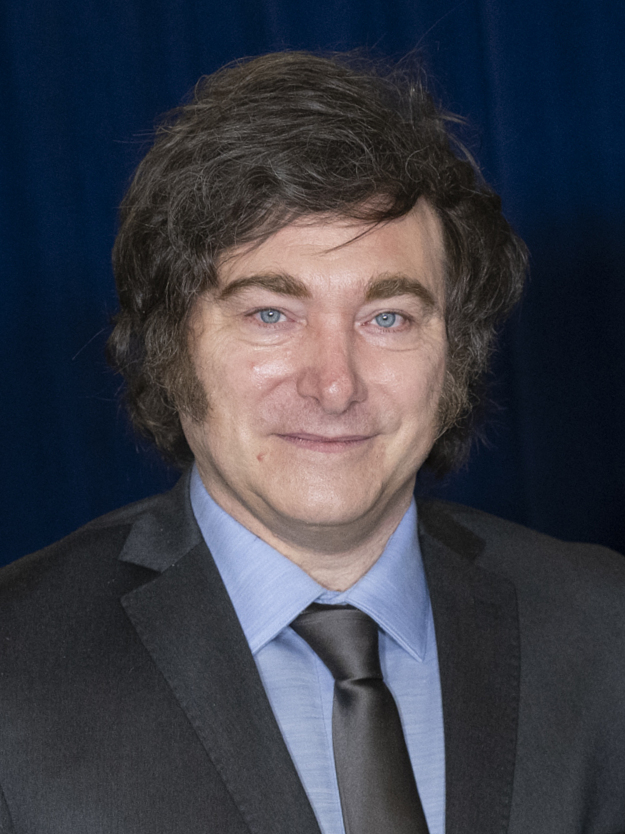
- Milei in 2025

President of Argentina
- Incumbent
- Assumed office 10 December 2023
- Vice President: Victoria Villarruel
- Preceded by: Alberto Fernández

National Deputy
- In office 10 December 2021 – 29 November 2023
- Constituency: City of Buenos Aires

Personal details
- Born: Javier Gerardo Milei; 22 October 1970 (age 56) Palermo, Buenos Aires, Argentina
- Citizenship: Argentina; Italy
- Party: Parties: Libertarian Party (2019–2024); La Libertad Avanza (since 2024)
- Other political affiliations: Coalitions: Avanza Libertad (2020–2021) La Libertad Avanza (since 2021)
- Relatives: Karina Milei (sister)
- Education: University of Belgrano (Lic.)
- Occupation: Politician; economist; author
- Economic school or tradition: Austrian school
- Website: javiermilei.com
- Javier Milei's voice Milei's speech at the delivery of Sabers to the Argentine Security Forces in the Casa Rosada; Recorded 26 November 2024

Javier Gerardo Milei (Note: Latin American Spanish pronunciation: [xaˈβjeɾ xeˈɾaɾðo miˈlej]) (born 22 October 1970) is an Argentine politician and economist who has served as the president of Argentina since 2023. He served as a member of the Chamber of Deputies from 2021 to 2023.

Born in Buenos Aires, Milei attended the University of Belgrano, where he obtained a degree in economics, and undertook postgraduate coursework at the Instituto de Desarrollo Económico y Social, and at Torcuato di Tella University, though neither resulted in a completed degree. He rose to public prominence in the 2010s by appearing as a pundit on various television shows in which he was a vocal critic of the Argentine political establishment.

In the 2021 legislative election, Milei was elected to the Argentine Chamber of Deputies, representing the City of Buenos Aires for La Libertad Avanza. As a national deputy, he limited his legislative activities to voting, focusing instead on critiquing Argentina's political elite and its propensity for high government spending. Milei pledged not to raise taxes and donated his national deputy salary through a monthly raffle. He defeated the incumbent economy minister Sergio Massa in the second round of the 2023 presidential election, on a platform that held the ideological dominance of Kirchnerism responsible for the ongoing Argentine monetary crisis.

Milei is known for his flamboyant personality, distinctive personal style, and strong media presence, including his catchphrase "¡Viva la libertad, carajo!". (Note: Translated into English as "Long live freedom, damn it".) He has been described politically as a right-wing populist and libertarian who supports laissez-faire economics, aligning specifically with minarchist and anarcho-capitalist principles. He has proposed a comprehensive overhaul of the country's fiscal and structural policies. On social issues, he opposes abortion and euthanasia, and he supports civilian ownership of firearms. He also supports "freedom of choice" on drug policy. On foreign policy, he promotes Atlanticism, advocating closer relations within the Western world, especially with both Israel and the United States (mainly under the Trump administration), while shifting Argentina away from BRICS.

Since taking office, Milei has focused on stabilizing Argentina's economy through spending cuts, deregulation, and monetary restraint after decades of economic mismanagement. According to National Institute of Statistics and Censuses of Argentina (INDEC), the government's statics agency, inflation fell sharply, the government achieved its first fiscal surplus since 2008, and poverty declined to an estimated 31.6% in early 2025, while wages partially recovered despite uneven sector performance. Economic growth modestly resumed, though rising living and healthcare costs and reduced consumption continued to strain public support. Milei's reforms were reinforced by La Libertad Avanza winning a plurality in the 2025 legislative elections.

== Early life and education ==
Javier Gerardo Milei was born on 22 October 1970 in Palermo, Buenos Aires, to Norberto Milei and Alicia Lucich. He grew up in the neighborhood of Villa Devoto and later moved to the Sáenz Peña district. Alicia worked as a homemaker, and Norberto was a bus driver who later became a successful businessman.

Milei is of paternal Italian descent. His grandfather came from Rossano in the Calabria region of Southern Italy in 1926. His father's maternal great-grandparents came from the municipalities Francavilla in Sinni and Pignola in the Basilicata region of Southern Italy. On his maternal side, he is of Croatian and Italian descent. His mother's paternal grandparents and great-grandparents came from Jelsa on the island of Hvar and settled in San Lorenzo, a department in the province of Santa Fe in Argentina. His mother's maternal grandparents came from San Severino in the Marche region of Central Italy and settled also in San Lorenzo. Milei revealed in 2024 that his grandfather, a great influence in his life, discovered that he was Jewish from matrilineal descent shortly before his death. He expressed that his grandfather's maternal grandfather may have been a rabbi.

Milei says he was subject to abuse during his childhood, and after he moved away from home as a young adult, he did not speak to his parents for a decade. By 2018, he had stopped talking to them entirely and regarded them as dead. Milei has said the abuse he suffered contributed to his ability to handle adversity. He was supported by his maternal grandmother and his younger sister, Karina, with whom he shares a close bond and whom he calls "the boss". Milei attended Catholic schools, including the Cardenal Copello secondary school. At school, he was nicknamed el Loco ("the Madman") for his outbursts and passionate rhetoric. In his late teens and early adulthood, Milei sang in the cover band Everest, which mostly played Rolling Stones covers. He played goalkeeper for the Chacarita Juniors football team until 1989, when Argentina suffered from hyperinflation, and he committed to a career in economics.

The collapse of Argentina's exchange rate led to Milei's interest in economics in the early 1980s. Milei studied introductory economics and the law of supply and demand, which seemed to him at odds with the ongoing hyperinflation; he said he saw people "throwing themselves on top of the merchandise" in a supermarket and began to study economics in more detail to understand it. For 15 years, he worked at the private company Corporación América as the chief economist and financial adviser to Eduardo Eurnekian.

Milei is the author of several books, including El camino del libertario. He has a notable presence on television, with a 2018 ranking by Ejes showing him as the most interviewed economist on TV, at 235 interviews totaling 193,347 seconds. Milei also hosted his own radio show, Demoliendo mitos (Demolishing Myths), featuring regular appearances by Alberdian and right-wing libertarian personalities, including economist and businessman Gustavo Lazzari, lawyer Pablo Torres Barthe, and political scientist María Zaldívar.

== Early political career ==
=== Rise to prominence ===
During the 2010s, Milei regularly participated in televised debates, where he was known for using strong language and confrontational rhetoric. In some instances, he insulted other participants and used profanity when expressing his political views, including during a debate with Buenos Aires chief of government Horacio Rodríguez Larreta. This led many commentators to label him anti-political or disruptive. United States Senator Ted Cruz jokingly proposed inviting him to the 2024 Republican Party presidential debates.

In 2017, Milei praised former economy minister Domingo Cavallo, describing him as the best to have held the position in Argentina. He credited Cavallo with ending the 1989 hyperinflation and initiating state reforms and attributed the 2001 economic crisis to earlier policy decisions that Cavallo was unable to reverse in time. In November 2017, Milei drew attention for criticizing the Faculty of Economic Sciences at the University of Buenos Aires, which he described as a center of Marxist indoctrination. He argued that this had contributed to what he called a widespread dominance of Keynesian economic thought in Argentina.

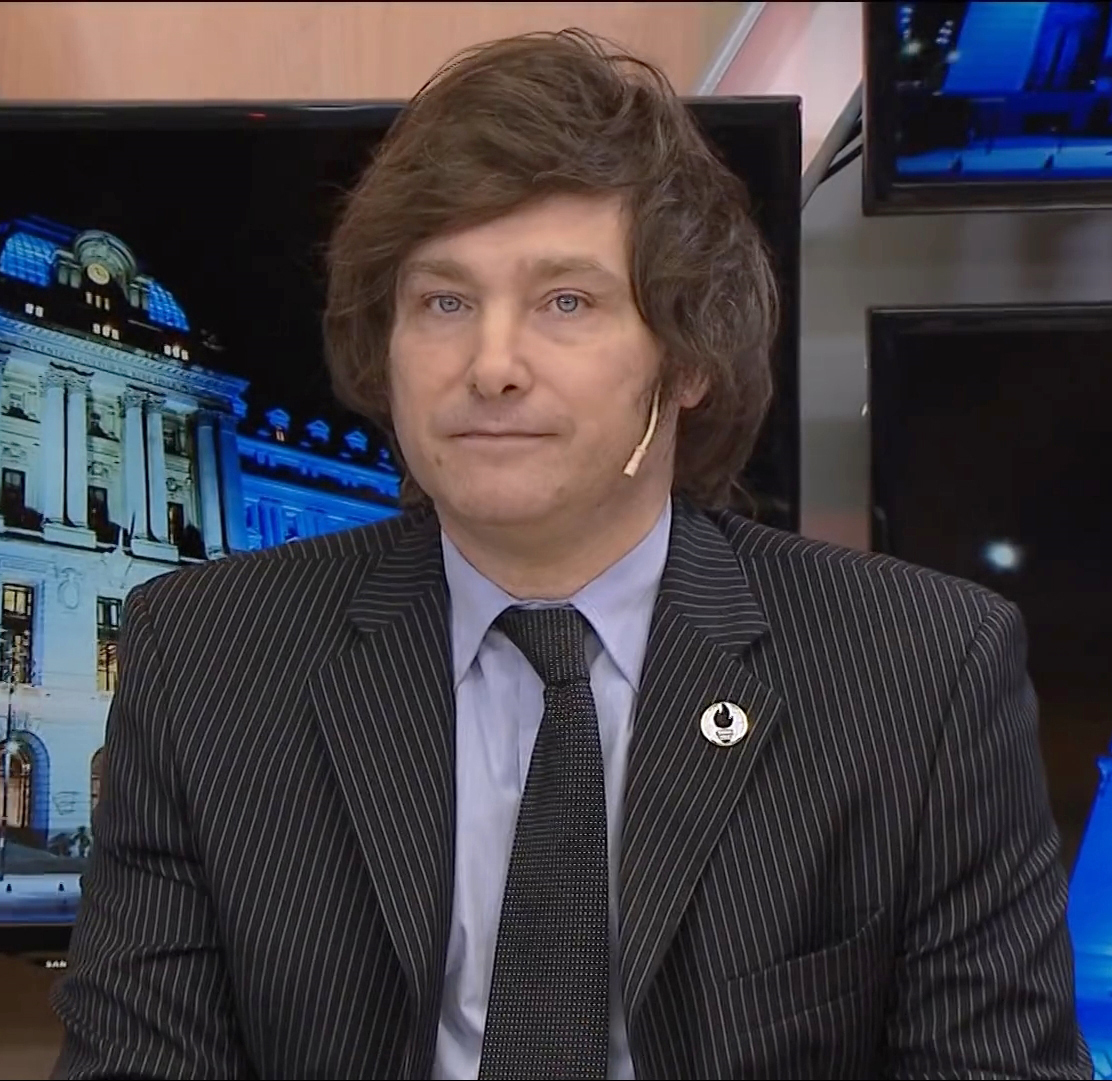
Milei during an interview on Todo Noticias in 2019

In June 2018, Milei was involved in a public dispute with journalist Teresita Frías after he called her “dumb” in response to calling his political views totalitarian. Consequently, a local court briefly imposed appearance restrictions on Milei, though no charges were filed. That same year, Milei made his acting debut in the play El consultorio de Milei, alongside Claudio Rico and Diego Sucalesca. In 2019, Todo Noticias included him on its list of the most influential people in Argentina. In 2020, he publicly supported protests against the government of President Alberto Fernández.

=== 2021 legislative campaign ===
From 2020 to 2021, Milei was a member of Avanza Libertad (Advance, Freedom), a political party founded by José Luis Espert. During his campaign for the Argentine Chamber of Deputies, Milei focused on Buenos Aires neighborhoods, where he took strolls and had talks with ordinary people. He pledged not to support any tax increases or new taxes. He ran under the slogan "I didn't come here to lead lambs, but to awaken lions", denouncing what he saw as a political caste, which he said was composed of "useless, parasitic politicians who have never worked". He called politicians "rats" and said they formed "a parasitic caste" that thinks only about getting rich. He used phrases like "I'm here to kick these criminals out" and was especially supported by youth; he promoted his political views on television, radio, and YouTube. Additionally, Milei reconciled with his parents.

In July 2021, Milei established the coalition La Libertad Avanza (Freedom Advances), which secured third place in primary elections with 13.66 percent of the vote and third in the 2021 Argentine legislative election with 17 percent, and the libertarian coalition entered the Argentine Congress. They performed best in Córdoba and Santa Fe, the second- and third-most populated districts in the country. They performed well in Peronist strongholds in North Tucumán, Salta, La Rioja, San Juan, and Santa Cruz in Patagonia, which is considered the cradle of Kirchnerism.

== National deputyship ==
After being elected to the Chamber of Deputies, Javier Milei began raffling off his monthly salary, stating that the initiative aimed to “return money to the citizens” and criticizing taxation as coercive. He described the salary as “dirty money” taken by force and claimed he was returning funds allegedly “stolen by the political caste”. The raffles, open to the general public, had distributed over seven million pesos by the time of reporting.

As a deputy, Milei had an attendance rate of 52% in the chamber as of April 2023. By August 2023, he had not introduced any legislation or joined parliamentary commissions. One of his absences was criticized by the opposition coalition Juntos por el Cambio, as it allowed the government to pass a tax increase on airline tickets by a single vote.

In July 2023, Milei was investigated over allegations of selling candidacies within La Libertad Avanza. Businessman Juan Carlos Blumberg accused the coalition of turning politics into a business, a claim Milei denied. He was also accused of receiving financial and logistical support from Peronist provincial governments. Journalist Juan Luis González alleged that Milei accepted funding and aid from the Peronist sectors he publicly opposed. Prosecutor Ramiro González stated there was no concrete evidence to support the claims at the time. Milei dismissed the investigation as a political attack and called for an inquiry into the prosecutor's conduct, accusing him of harming his reputation. The case was closed in March 2024 due to a lack of sufficient evidence for formal charges.

=== Coinx World promotion ===
On 18 December 2021, Milei promoted the financial services company Coinx World on his Instagram account after visiting its offices in Buenos Aires. In his post, he praised the company's investment platform and encouraged his followers to contact them. Coinx World used the visit for promotional purposes on social media, presenting itself as a financial technology firm specializing in algorithmic trading. The company stated that its meeting with Milei was a consultation on communication strategy and claimed that its operations were supported by El Salvadoran legislation, where it was headquartered.

Financial experts warned that CoinX's claims were unsustainable and compared its operation to a Ponzi scheme. At that time, Milei was not registered in Argentina's National Securities Commission to make invitations to the public to invest, nor did Coinx World have the authorization to operate in the public offering, which led the National Securities Commission to declare it as an irregular public offering in 2022.

In an interview with journalist Ernesto Tenembaum in June 2022, Milei claimed that he was paid for that public support just like he is paid for "all his opinions," and that the company "did not scam anyone". He explained that Coinx World "took money and used it to buy securities in US dollars. With the devaluation that occurred, they were able to pay significantly higher interest rates in Argentine pesos than those offered by Argentina's Central Bank, which allowed them to secure funding to invest in their crypto farms where they generated cryptocurrencies and had more money. The business model was well-structured." Milei could not explain why he encouraged his followers to invest in Coinx World and did not apologize to the victims when asked to do so.

Milei defended the company on social media when some followers pointed out it could be a pyramid scheme. "Coinx paid everyone", he said. "Do not let yourselves be fooled by the paid hitmen of Juntos por el Cambio." In 2023, Coinx World was shut down by regulators after a criminal investigation for allegedly operating as a Ponzi scheme. Police raids were conducted on its offices in Buenos Aires and Santa Fe with four employees, including its CEO, being arrested. Investors, the majority of whom followed Milei on social media, sued him for losses estimated between AR$30,000,000 and AR$40,000,000 (approximately US$300,000 at the time). According to its website, Coinx World operated in Argentina, Brazil, and El Salvador.

== Elections ==
=== 2023 presidential campaign ===
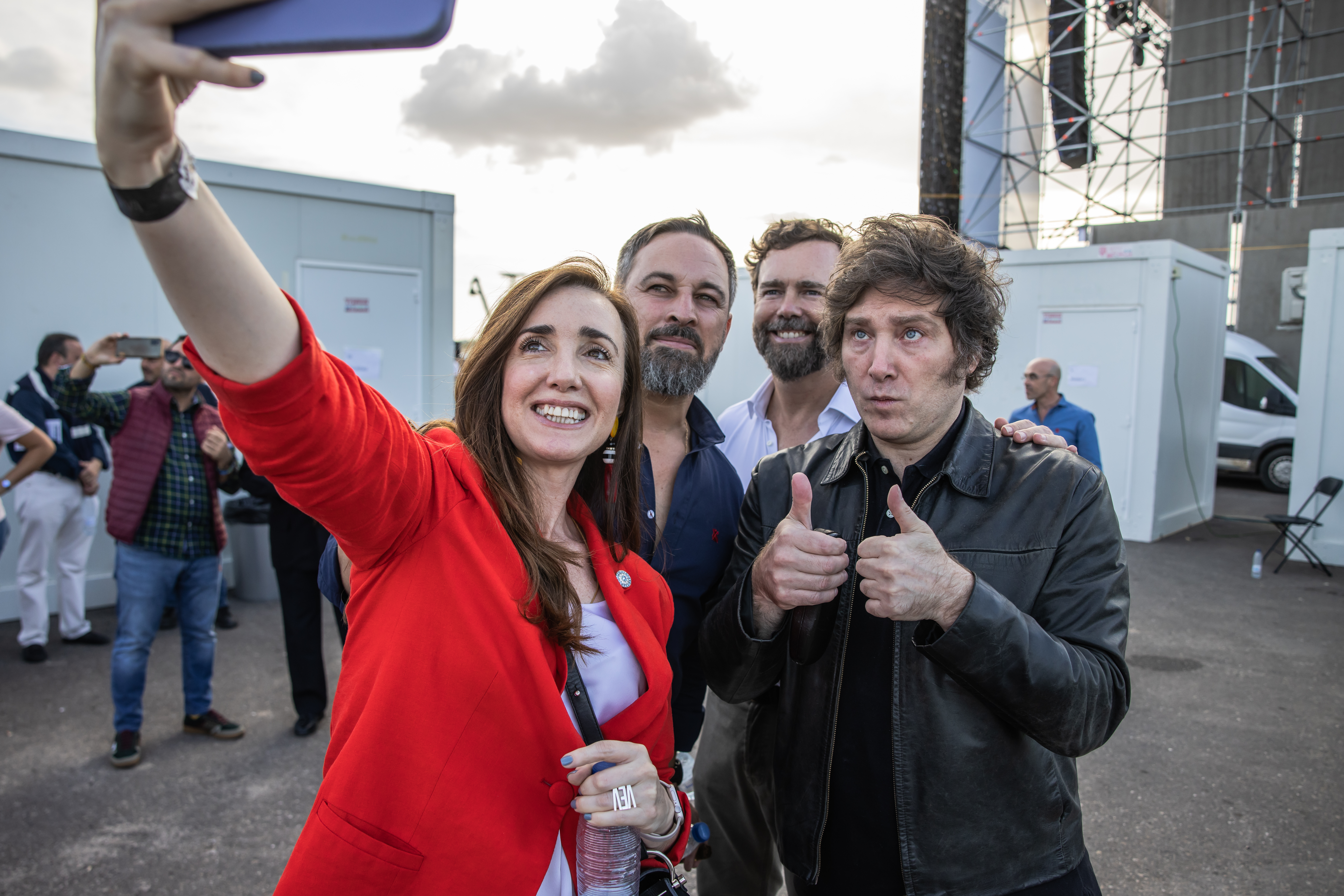
Milei posing with Villarruel and Santiago Abascal in October 2022

As a member of the Libertarian Party, Milei ran for president of Argentina as part of La Libertad Avanza, a right-wing political coalition. His running mate was Victoria Villarruel. His younger sister Karina managed his campaign. In May 2022, Milei was rising in the polls. In June 2022, he officially launched his presidential campaign. In March 2023, a poll showed that 17 percent of Argentines would vote for him and that his political coalition would become the third parliamentary force in the Argentine Congress. His rhetoric was attractive to under-30 voters born during the 1998–2002 Argentine great depression and facing the still ongoing economic stagnation. His supporters include those who once voted for Kirchnerism but would now vote for Milei as a protest even if they did not support his economic ideas. Lucas Romero, the head of Synopsis, a local political consulting firm and Andrei Roman, CEO of Brazil-based pollster Atlas Intel believe that Milei's victory in the 2023 elections was not necessarily a result of popular approval of his ideas but rather stemmed from widespread dissatisfaction with the political establishment, which had been strongly left-wing in its economic approach. The people thus wanted change.

As annual inflation rose above 100 percent in May 2023, Milei's position in the polls rose. In June 2023, the markets welcomed Sergio Massa's presidential candidacy, as it polarized the election between the ruling party and Juntos por el Cambio, reducing the "Milei factor". Notable moments in Milei's campaign included a viral video of him tearing cards from a wallboard with the names of ministries that he wants to abolish and tossing them into the air as he said afuera ("out"), wielding a chainsaw on stage, smashing a piñata on air to symbolize his plans, calling Pope Francis "a filthy leftist", and praising American gangster Al Capone as "a hero".

=== Primary and general elections ===
First and second round results of the 2023 Argentine presidential election

In the August 2023 primary elections, which are seen as an indication of how citizens are likely to vote in the October 2023 general election, Milei emerged as the leading candidate, with 30 percent of the vote, ahead of the traditional Peronism–Kirchnerism and Macrism that dominated the country in the 2010s. Milei's victory was celebrated by right-wing figures, including Jair Bolsonaro, José Antonio Kast, Ted Cruz, and the Spanish conservative political party Vox. Polls had predicted that Massa would secure the most votes as a candidate in the primaries, with Juntos por el Cambio expected to be the most supported coalition overall; Milei polled at about 20 percent and was seen as an outsider candidate. Initially, for the first round of the general election, with the possibility of a runoff in November, Peronists saw Milei as a possible ally who would divide the votes of the Juntos por el Cambio coalition.

As a result of his strong performance in the primaries, Milei was considered the front-runner in the general election. His rise has been placed within the context of the last two presidencies of Macri and Fernández. On 22 October, Milei advanced to the runoff, facing Massa in what polls showed as a tight race. In the runoff on 19 November, Milei defeated Massa in a landslide and a historic election. It was the highest vote percentage since Argentina's transition to democracy. Observers generally saw Milei's win as a sign more of discontent with the status quo than support for his politics, and his victory was likened to Donald Trump's in the United States and Jair Bolsonaro's in Brazil. Within the Argentine Congress, Milei's coalition achieved about 20% in the Chamber of Deputies and 10% in the Senate. In his victory speech, Milei pledged a new political era, vowing to begin "the reconstruction of Argentina" and end its economic decline.

=== 2025 Argentine legislative elections ===
In the 2025 legislative election, La Libertad Avanza took first place with 40.84% of the vote, much stronger than expected, and the opposition Peronist coalition Homeland Force took second place with 31.63% of the vote. Turnout was lower than usual, at 67.85 percent of the 36 million eligible voters – the lowest tally for a national election since the return of democracy in 1983. Prior polling forecasted La Libertad Avanza attaining 30 to 35% of the vote. Several American media outlets reported the strong win as a renewed mandate for Milei's policies.

== Presidency (2023–present) ==
=== Early actions (2023–2025) ===
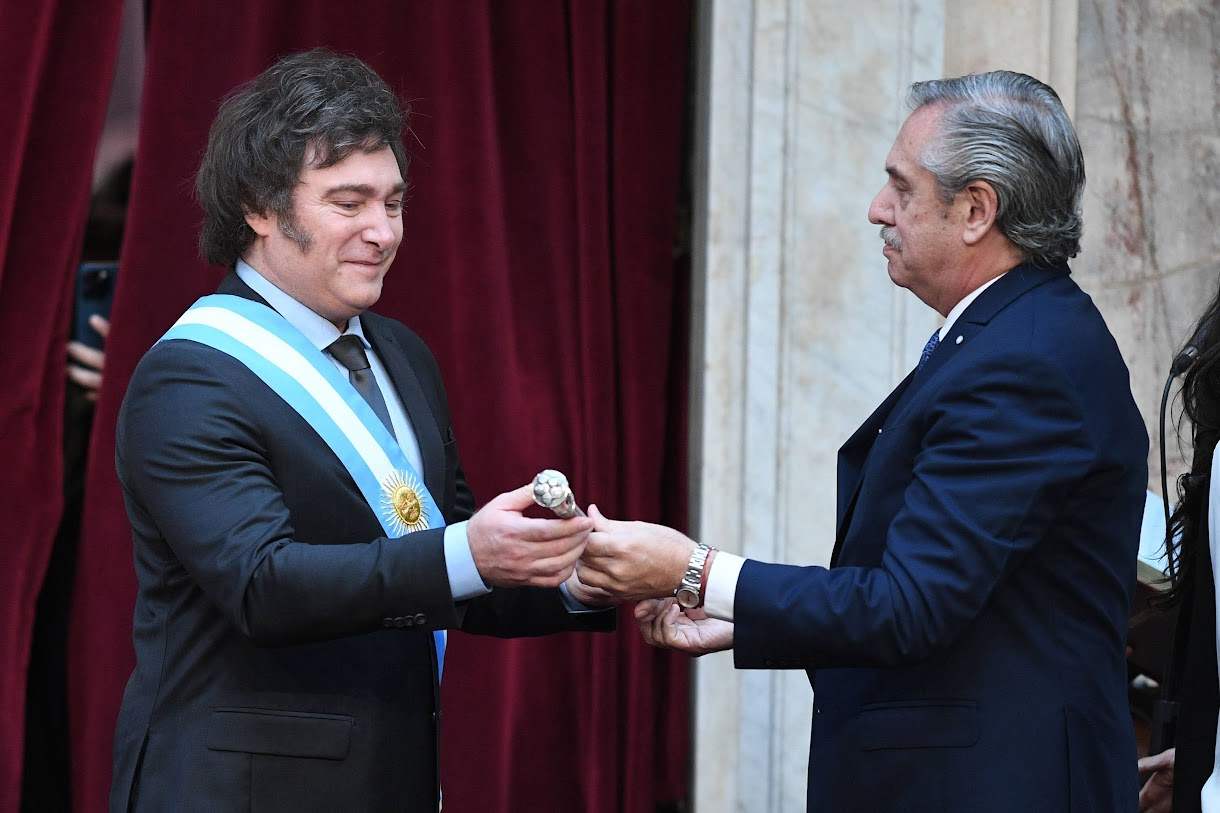
Alberto Fernández awarding Milei the presidential scepter during the inauguration on 10 December 2023

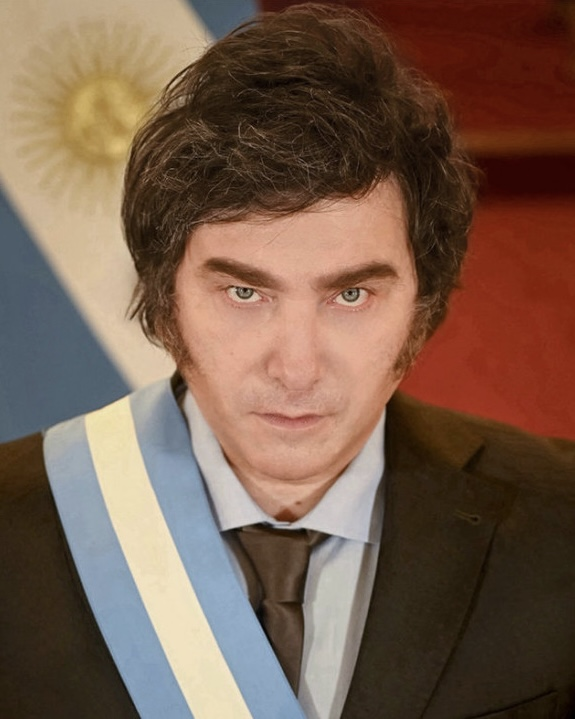
Milei's official portrait, 2023

Milei took office as president on 10 December 2023, amidst a lack of support in Congress, an annual inflation rate approaching 200%, rising poverty, and a polarized population as challenges for his presidency. His foreign minister, Diana Mondino, announced that Argentina would not join the BRICS bloc of developing economies, as had been planned for 2024. In his first speech as president, Milei warned of an economic shock, described as shock therapy in monetary terms, to be used to fix Argentina's financial woes. Following his inauguration, Milei saw his popularity rise. After the first governmental and economic reforms he and his ministers made, 53% of the Argentine people had a good, or excellent, opinion of him, according to a poll by Aresco on 15 December.

Milei's cabinet includes ministers from La Libertad Avanza and Juntos por el Cambio. In his first acts as president, Milei signed 13 decrees related to his cabinet members. He also lowered the number of ministries from 18 to 9. He appointed three secretariats with portfolio rank, including his sister, to the position of General Secretary of the Presidency, after modifying the anti-nepotism law prohibiting the appointment of family members.

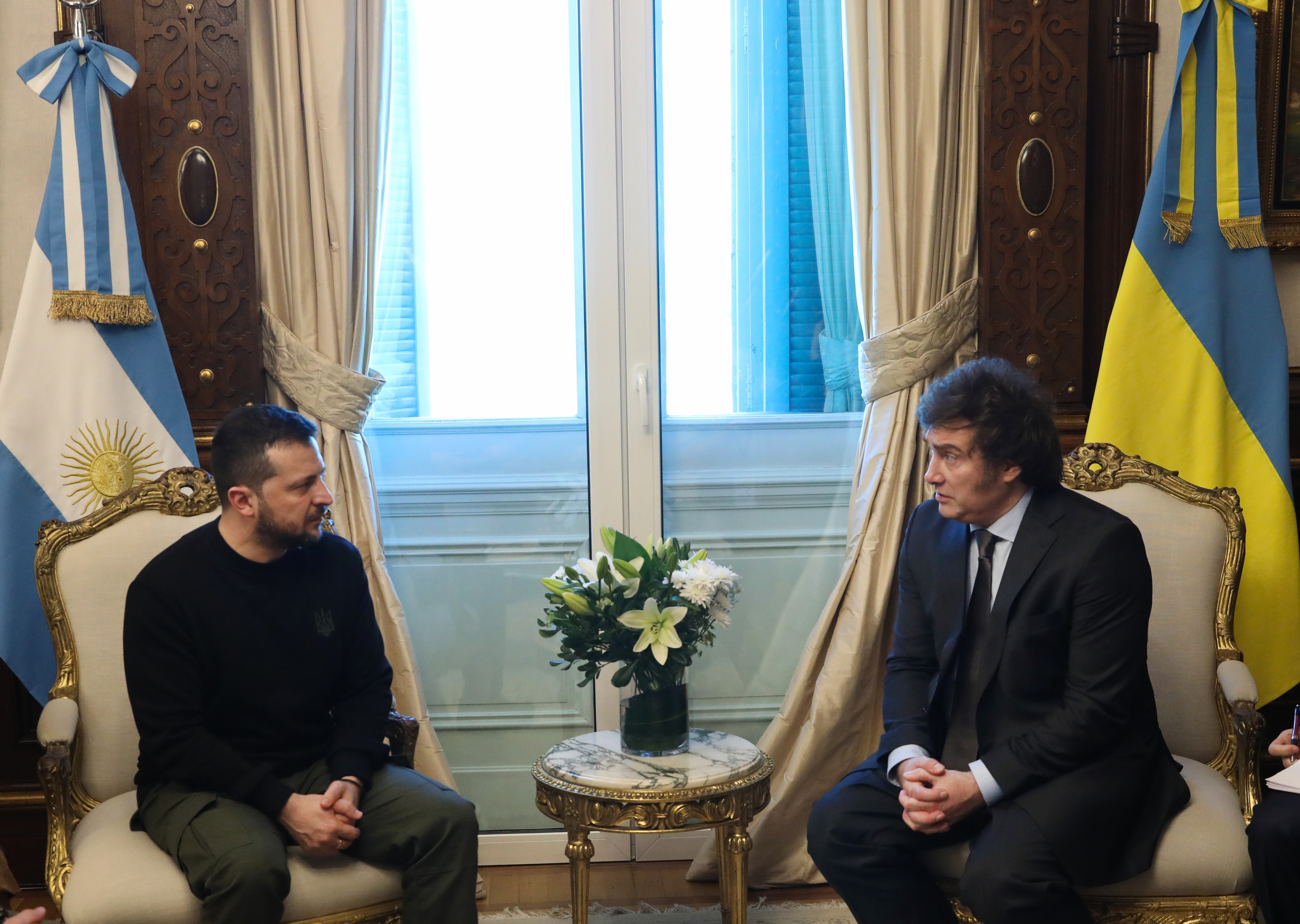
Milei and Ukrainian President Volodymyr Zelenskyy in Buenos Aires, 10 December 2023

Milei signed Decree 70/2023, deregulating the Argentine economy. Since such a move is subject to approval by Congress, it called for an extraordinary session, to be held in the first months of 2024. As part of the measure, an estimated 5,000 public sector employees were expected to be affected. An Argentine court halted the labor reforms that were part of the decree. The CGT also organized a general strike against the proposed policies involving tens of thousands of Argentine workers on a 12-hour strike, which resulted in the cancellation of hundreds of flights.

In March 2024, when Argentina submitted a complaint against Venezuela to the International Civil Aviation Organization for violating the Convention on International Civil Aviation, Milei and Venezuelan President Nicolás Maduro traded accusations. That month, Milei approved the transfer of two military Mi-171E helicopters to Ukraine, which it later received. On 18 April, Argentina formally submitted a request to become a NATO global partner. Meanwhile, various anti-government protests took place from January to June over e.g. not increasing university funds and cuts to subsidies and social programmes. These protests occurred in the context of broad, general approval according to a poll published by Clarín on 7 June 2024, where most Argentines had a positive image of their president and an optimistic view of future economic measures. Under his watch, Argentina exited deficit for the first time in 123 years. In a speech given to the World Economic Forum, Milei encouraged a worldwide push for libertarianism, claiming Argentina's was a successful example. He also stated that "radical feminism" was a "distortion" of equality.

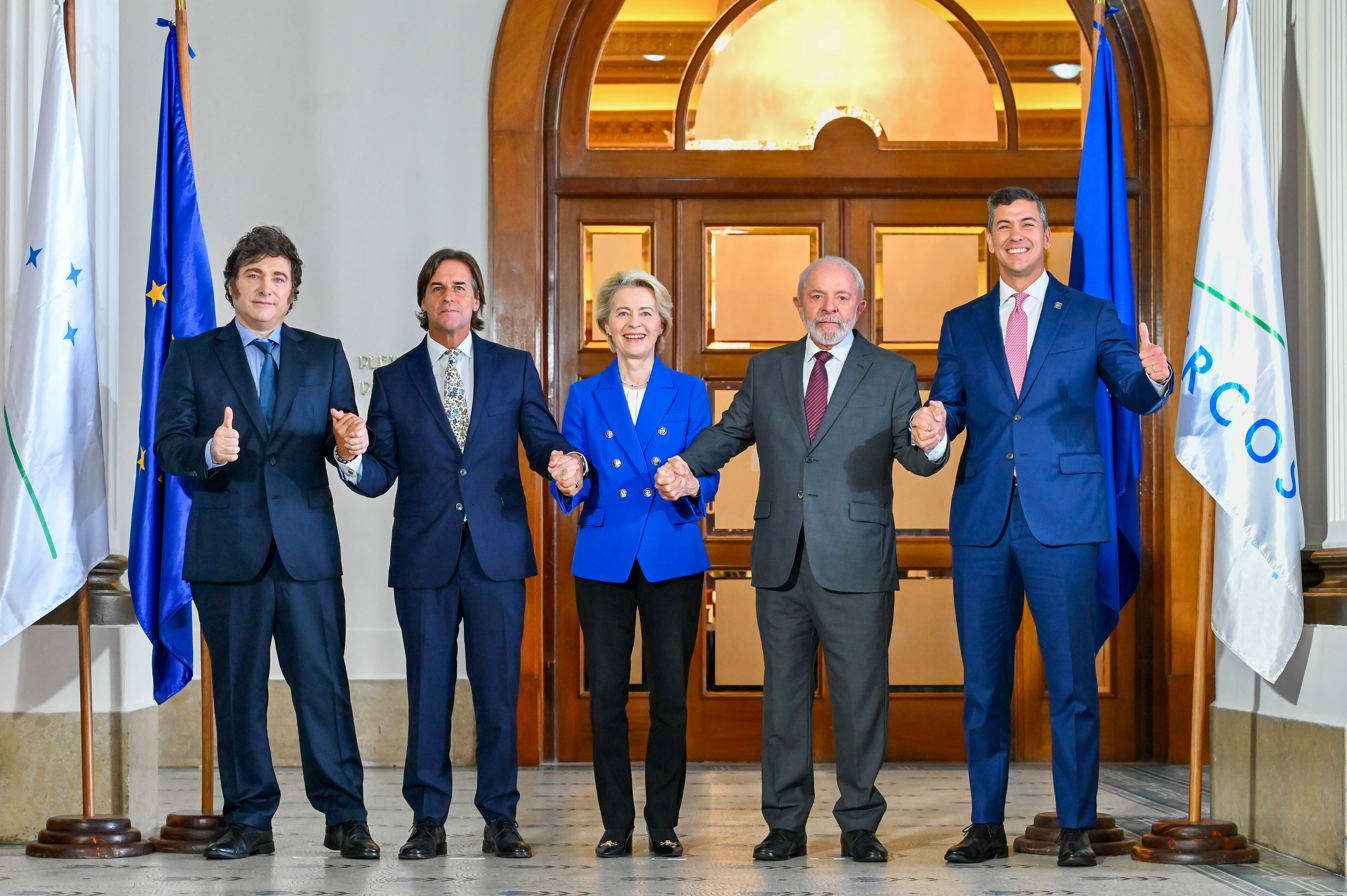
Milei and other Mercosur leaders with European Commission President Ursula von der Leyen at the 65th Mercosur Summit in Montevideo, Uruguay, 5 December 2024

In 2024, legal scholar Manuel García-Mansilla was nominated to fill the vacancy left by Minister Juan Carlos Maqueda and Ariel Lijo was nominated to fill the vacancy left by Elena Highton de Nolasco to the Supreme Court by Milei. On 26 February 2025, Milei appointed both of them by presidential decrees after they failed to obtain clearance in the senate. Some lawmakers questioned Lijo's fitness to serve on the court over corruption concerns, and Human Rights Watch called Milei's appointments "one of the most serious attacks against the independence of the Supreme Court in Argentina since the return of democracy". On 4 April 2025 both were rejected by the Senate, with Mansilla receiving 51 votes against and 21 in favor and Lijo receiving 43 votes against and 27 in favour, in what was branded as a tactical alliance between UP and PRO. The primary reason was the majority of senators disapproval of appointment by decree to the Supreme Court which was described as a political defeat for Milei.

The government has adopted a policy of scaling back its involvement in public health and has cut budgets for perinatal care. Infant mortality rose by 6.25% in 2024, breaking a long-standing downward trend.

In May 2025, Milei signed a decree to tighten immigration laws in Argentina. Milei said that immigrants were bringing "chaos and abuse" to Argentina, and ordered that the path to citizenship be restricted, with foreign nationals having to reside two years without interruption in Argentina and show proof of income or "sufficient means", plus a clean criminal record in their home countries. Presidential spokesman Manuel Adorni said that Milei's decree "honors history to Make Argentina Great Again", as the opposition likened Milei's move to Trump's similar immigration policies in the US.

On 18 May 2025, local elections were held in the capital of Argentina, Buenos Aires. Manuel Adorni, Milei's top presidential spokesman, attained victory with 30% of the votes, a larger margin than anticipated; while the center right opposition, PRO, suffered its worst defeat since taking power in Buenos Aires two decades ago, with only 16%. The peronist candidate Leandro Santoro lost with 27% of the votes. The voting turnout for the election was at a historic low of 53% despite compulsory voting.

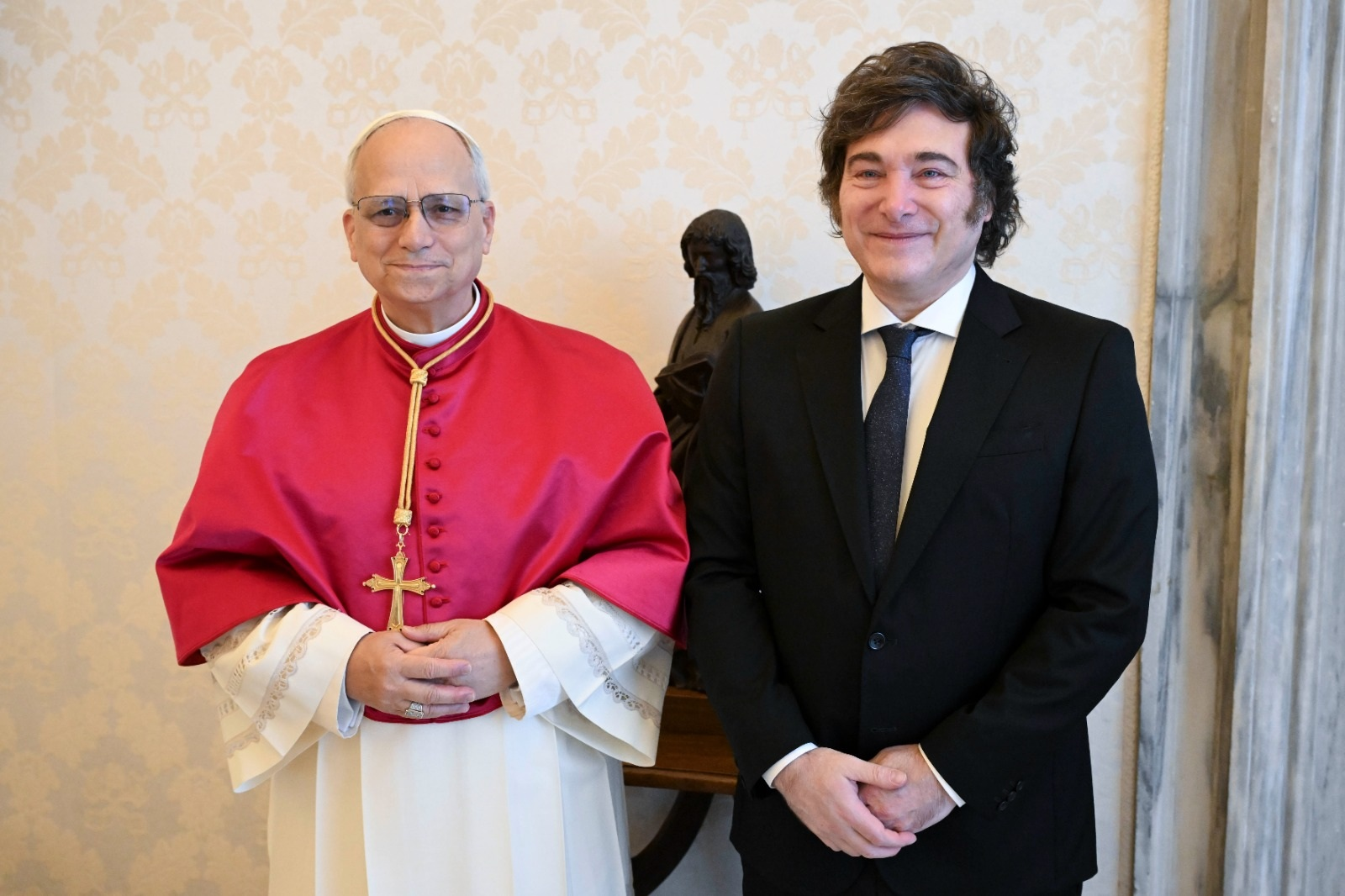
Milei with Pope Leo XIV in June 2025

In August 2025, Karina Milei, who holds the post of Secretary General of the Presidency and is a close adviser and sibling to President Javier Milei, had been implicated in a corruption scandal centering on alleged kickbacks from pharmaceutical contracts managed through Argentina's National Disability Agency (ANDIS). The allegations emerged after leaked audio recordings from Diego Spagnuolo, the former head of ANDIS and previously a lawyer for Milei, in which he claims that companies seeking disability-related contracts were pressured to pay an "8% commission" (kickback) on contracts, a portion of which would go to Karina Milei and her associate Eduardo "Lule" Menem. The scandal has been politically damaging as it contradicts Milei's public image as an outsider committed to fighting corruption; it has provoked public outrage, especially given that the alleged misconduct involves contracts aimed at vulnerable populations; and it may have electoral consequences for his party (La Libertad Avanza) in forthcoming legislative elections. Though there is no evidence that Javier Milei had a role in the scandal, it still affected his chances of winning the electoral vote in Buenos Aires, resulting in a Peronist victory.

On 7 September 2025, following weeks after Karina's scandal came to light, Milei's party had lost a key electoral election in Buenos Aires, with La Libertad Avanza attaining 33% of the votes while the Peronist opposition received 47%. President Milei conceded defeat and reflected on the reasons for the loss, but vowed to not repeat his mistakes and to accelerate his economic agenda ahead of schedule. In 2023, Peronism got 4.3 million votes (about 45%) while LLA received 2.3 million. This time, it got 3.8 million votes while LLA attained 2.7 million votes. Voter turnout was only 61%.

On 10 September 2025, Milei reorganized the Secretariat of the Interior into a ministry, reversing a downgrade in 2024 that he had made as part of his pledge to reduce public deficits and the size of the government. This occurred amid La Libertad Avanza losing heavily in the 2025 Buenos Aires provincial election. In October 2025, President Javier Milei's party, La Libertad Avanza, won a landslide victory in midterm elections, making it easier for Milei to push ahead with his programme of radical spending cuts and free-market reforms.

In late 2025, the Milei administration announced the creation of a new "Agencia Nacional de Migraciones" (National Immigration Agency), moving control from the Interior Ministry to the Security Ministry, with a focus on border control and security, described by some as an Argentine equivalent to U.S. Immigration and Customs Enforcement (ICE).

=== Later actions (2025–present) ===
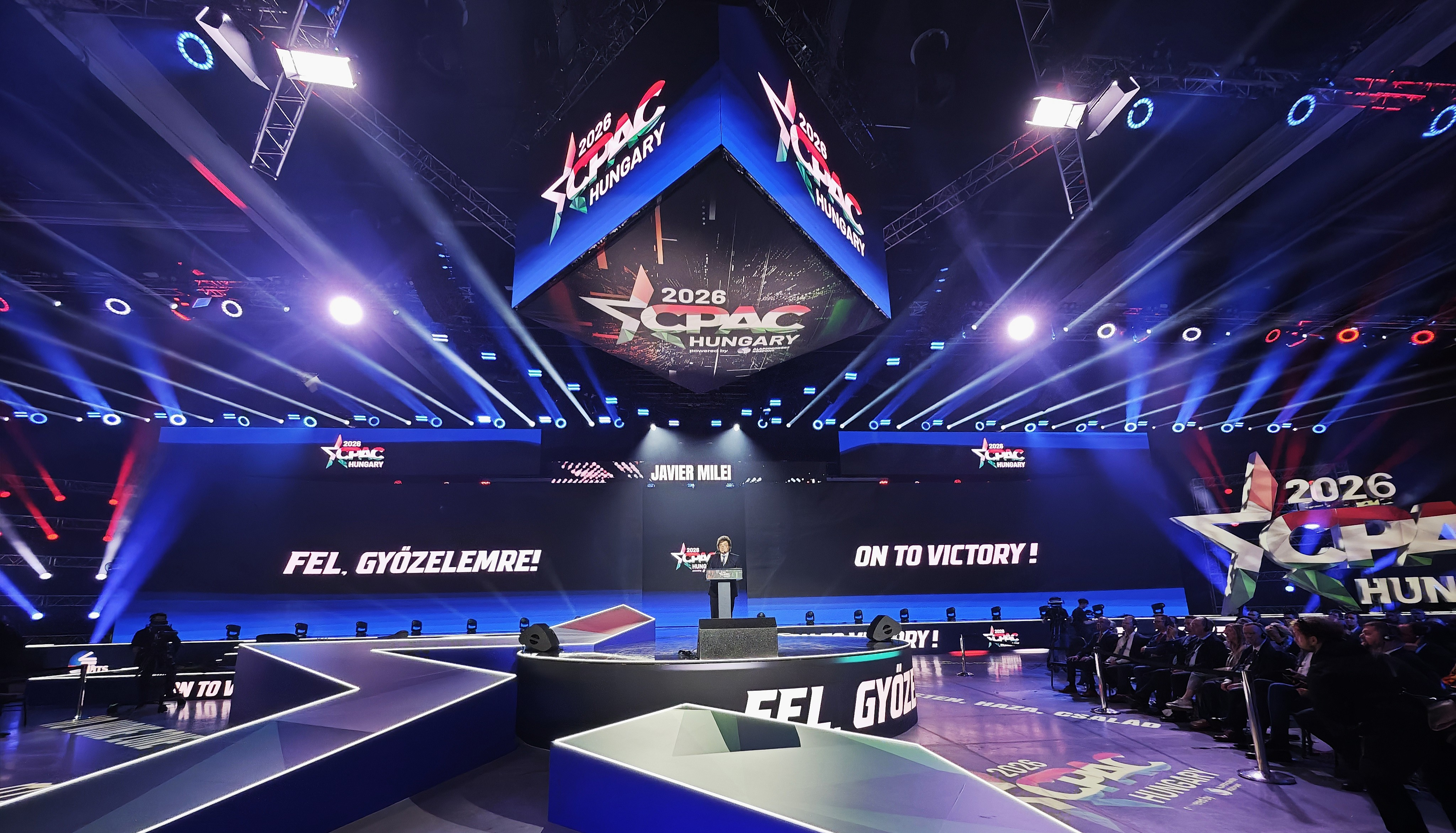
Speaking at CPAC Budapest 2026

Javier Milei, following a strong showing in the recent mid-term elections where he tripled his presence in Congress, has embarked on a drive to solidify his reform agenda in Argentina. First, he convened governors and the Buenos Aires mayor at the Casa Rosada, gathering 20 out of 23 provinces (while excluding four Peronist leaders) to build consensus around his 2026 Budget and structural reforms focused on labour, tax and penal-code changes. Concurrently, he announced a sweeping “new economic roadmap” to be deployed once the new Congress seats in December, featuring major labour, tax and pension overhauls aimed at restoring fiscal balance, formalizing informal work, simplifying the tax burden and protecting private property — part of his broader vision of making Argentina “the freest country in the world.”

In February 2026, the National Congress approved legislation supported by Milei to liberalise Argentina's labour laws.

=== Economy ===
In 2024, under President Javier Milei, Argentina saw major economic changes, focusing on austerity, deregulation, and reducing government spending. The most pressing issue for Milei was hyperinflation. Inflation dropped from 300% in May 2024 to 55.9% in March 2025, the lowest level in over three years, with monthly inflation hitting a five-year low of 2.2% in January. Milei cut government positions by approximately 52,000, a reduction of between 9.6% and 15.7%; reduced salaries of high-ranking officials; and shut down the tax agency (AFIP), replacing it with a smaller one, saving billions. While poverty rose to 57% early in 2024, it declined to 38.1% by Q3, with homelessness also decreasing.

The economy shrank in early 2024, but grew 3.9% in Q3, helped by an 80.2% rebound in agriculture. The Argentine peso strengthened by 44.2% against the U.S. dollar, boosting average wages in dollar terms to $990. Wages, along with purchasing power in Argentina began falling in October 2023, before Milei was elected and inaugurated as president. By the start of his presidency, real wages fell by more than 20%. They have mostly rebounded back to their November 2023 levels, ending the first year of his presidency as an economic success.

Argentina paid off $4.3 billion in debt, and investor confidence soared, pushing bond prices higher. According to Gallup, the confidence in the economy by everyday people soared in end of 2024, reaching heights not seen since 2015. The country signed a free trade deal with the EU, and credit ratings improved. Forecasts predict economic growth of 3.5%–5.5% in 2025 as inflation stabilizes and investments increase. Argentina's market risk assessment fell below 500 points for the first time since 2018.

2025 was a turbulent year for Milei. Inflation had become 1.5% a month, and poverty had markedly fallen to 31.6%, the lowest it had been since 2018. In the first half of 2025, reports indicate that the middle class grew by 7.7 million, rebounding back to pre-pandemic levels of 39% Moody's have increased Argentina's rating from 'Ca' to 'Caa3 as Argentina's economy demonstrates solid recovery progress. While average wages increased 20.7% in the first half of 2025, outpacing the country's 15.1% inflation rate, and GDP was expected to grow 5.5%, final GDP for the year ended up at 4.37%, and while wages rose 28.8%, the inflation rate reached 31.8%, resulting in a 2.5% decline in real purchasing power. Milei contended that a fiscal surplus remained non-negotiable, with a target of 1.6% for 2025, and a surplus of 1.4% was achieved.

Karina's scandal and the subsequent loss of the legislative elections in Buenos Aires resulted in backlash from the markets, temporarily jeopardizing the macro-economic situation that Milei had dedicated his presidency to date, as the market feared that Milei losing the midterm elections would result in the stifling of his agenda. The meltdown caused Argentina to blow through 1 billion dollars of reserves to uphold the peso. U.S. Secretary of the Treasury Scott Bessent's announcement that all options are available between the American treasury and Argentine government halted the gradual implosion. The economic reforms and policies have had a significant impact on the average Argentine, as some common expenses such as private school tuition and health insurance plans have risen above CPI.

Despite soaring disapproval ratings, Milei achieved victory in the legislative elections of 2025, attaining a larger than expected share of votes. The victory galvanized the economy, leading towards bonds increasing by 23% in a day, the Argentine stock market growing by 70% compared to last month and the peso briefly appreciating in value. The country risk index dropped by 40% after the elections.

President Milei stopped an economic crises from unraveling even further in 2024, but recovery has proven difficult and in some cases uneven. “Without investment, amid business closures and no formal job creation, the Argentine economy is moving neither backward nor forward,” said Lorenzo Sigaut Gravina, an economist at consulting firm Equilibra, which forecasts just two percent growth this year.

==== Inflation ====
Inflation was the foremost largest issue dominating contemporary Argentine politics, as it spiraled out of control during and for some time after the elections of 2023. The issue had been a consistent phenomenon throughout the history of Argentina, a country whose economy had been mismanaged for decades. Milei, convinced that the Peronist establishment largely caused the economic crisis, made it his main objective during the first and second year of his presidency to stop the situation from getting worse through anti-inflationary economic policies, and to diminish the influence of Peronism. Annual inflation stood at 254.2% in the first month of Milei's term, and reached a peak of 300% in May 2024. Monthly inflation slowed in 2024 as Milei continued to push austerity and deregulation measures to revive the country's struggling economy. Annual inflation rate came in at 39.4% in July 2025. On the same month, monthly inflation reached a 5-year low of 1.5%.

Wages, along with purchasing power in Argentina began falling in October 2023, before Milei was elected and inaugurated as president. By the start of his presidency, real wages fell by more than 20%. In 2024, wages rose by 145.5%, outpacing the 117.8% inflation rate for the first time since 2021, according to INDEC. According to Nowcast, the year-over-year increase in total family income (ITF) reached 185.7%. In October 2024, CEPA reported that private sector wages had nearly returned to November 2023 levels. However, public sector incomes remained 14.8% lower, and informal workers were still down 21.3%. Continuing this trend, wages have risen by 20.7% in the first half of 2025, above an inflation rate of 15.1%, however it again fell below inflation in the second half of 2025 for some sectors.

The defeat in the local elections in Buenos Aires scared the market, with investors afraid that Milei would not be able to maintain his free market agenda in his presidential term. Victory in the legislative elections caused the Peso to rally temporarily before stabilizing again.

==== Reforms ====
During his campaign and throughout his presidency, Javier Milei has said several times that the reforms he plans to enact are "painful", but "necessary", contending that it is "the only way". "There is no alternative to a shock adjustment", Milei said during his inauguration. "There is no money." In June 2024, Milei was able to pass his tax and 'omnibus' bill. The bill, watered down significantly from its original form, aimed at deregulating and reforming several sectors and state owned enterprises in Argentina, also included reforms concerning labour, commerce and real estate and various social programmes such as healthcare.

President Javier Milei achieved a budget surplus within the first few months in office by gutting chunks of the government structure and downsizing it drastically and reducing the salaries of high ranking authorities, leading to a reduction of government spending by 30%. This has resulted in a financial surplus for 6 consecutive months for the first time since 2008. The reforms have led to 9.6% of all federal employees (approximately 52,000) being laid off, saving the government nearly 2.1 billion in taxes.

In July 2024, the Argentine National Congress approved Milei's Ley de Bases, a wide-ranging reform law that marked a major legislative achievement for a government with limited parliamentary representation; a central element of the law is the Incentive Regime for Large Investments (Régimen de Incentivos para Grandes Inversiones, RIGI), which seeks to attract large-scale domestic and foreign investment by guaranteeing stable tax, foreign exchange, trade, and capital repatriation rules for up to 30 years. The regime applies to projects exceeding US$200 million in sectors such as energy, oil and gas, mining, infrastructure, forestry, tourism, technology, and steel, with enhanced benefits for investments above US$1 billion, including lower corporate and dividend taxes, phased elimination of export taxes, and exemptions from capital and trade controls. RIGI is predicted to reduce investor exposure to Argentina's historically volatile economic conditions and support a shift away from a state-centered, inflation-prone economic model toward greater financial stability and private investment.

Milei's repealing of rent controls in December 2023 has caused rental unit supply to increase by 190%. This resulted in a 40% decline in real price of rental properties when adjusted for inflation. Inflation-adjusted rents have remained relatively stable since. From January to May 2025 rents have increased by 1.6% after adjusting for inflation.

Real (inflation-adjusted) rents declined by around 40% after rent control was abolished, using data from Zonaprop and INDEC

"He has done more good than many people expected", said Alejandro Werner, a former official with the International Monetary Fund. "Maybe I would choose to do it a different way. But, sometimes, to change things, you need somebody that’s a little bit of a fanatic to really move the needle. And he has done it." Though the macroeconomic side had become stabilized, the societal consequences were palpable. Patience towards president Milei's reforms runs thin as his economic reforms cuts into salaries and pushes up the cost of living.

Data from the IARAF institute shows President Milei decreased government spending by approximately 8 billion dollars in 2 years.

Milei's government initiated a program titled "Fiscal Innocence" in a bid to integrate an estimated $170 billion dollars that reside outside the formal financial system and drive growth. That program would allow Argentinians to deposit money into the banks without needing to declare a source of income or incur additional tax obligations. This program has met with little success however to shift the trends resulting from the 2001 forced conversion to the peso which saw most Argentines lose nearly 75% of their savings. Longstanding distrust of the government and financial systems following this and other incidents has led to wide spread retention of hard currency, termed "mattress dollars." Argentines continue to buy around $2 billion of foreign currency every month as a hedge against inflation.

==== Poverty ====
During the first six months of his presidency, poverty rates increased by over 11 percentage points, from 41.7% to 52.9%, briefly peaking at 57.4% at the end of January 2024. In response, his government pointed out that poverty rates were already rising under previous administrations. According to INDEC, poverty rates fell to 38.1% during the third quarter of 2024. Conversely, the Catholic University of Argentina (UCA) estimated poverty for the same quarter as 41.6%, adjusted for the reduced consumption rates as well as rising healthcare costs.

The Ministry of Human Capital estimated a drop in poverty during the first quarter of 2025 from 38.1% to 31.7%. An economist working for CEDLAS (Center for distributive, Labour and Social Studies), estimates that between October 2024 and March 2025, the poverty rate dropped to 34.4%. A report published in July 2025 largely confirmed these predictions, finding that Argentina's urban poverty rate dropped to 31.6% in the first half of 2025, its lowest level since 2018. Extreme poverty also decreased from 18.2% to 7.4% annually.

INDEC reported the official poverty rate to be 31.6% of the general population in the first half of 2025, with household poverty coming in at 24.1%. The UCA disputes the magnitude of the reduction, arguing that INDEC uses an inadequate methodology. They find that poverty has decreased to 36.3%, compared to their previous estimate of 45.6% in the same period a year ago, lowest since 2018.

Income inequality increased slightly from 0.417 to 0.436 in 2024, but decreased to 0.427 by the end of 2025.

==== International trade and payments ====
In June, during a meeting in Berlin, Milei and German chancellor Olaf Scholz expressed support for a free trade agreement between the EU and Mercosur. An agreement on the free trade deal was announced on 6 December 2024.

Milei's actions have led to Argentina regaining a favourable relation with the IMF after having been in a precarious position for almost 2 years, securing a 20 billion dollar loan. Since July 2022, the country has consistently kept a risk assessment of over 2000 points, well above the continental average of 250 points, marking significant volatility and lack of trust in the market. Since Milei's victory, the risk assessment trended downward, falling below 500 points for the first time since 2018. The loan is set to be used to disintegrate the remaining capital controls on the peso, as well as aiding the government in building up reserves, which had been exhausted prior to his presidency. J. P. Morgan has commented that "The policy advancements represent a significant step forward, enabling the country to unlock a potential that has been stifled for decades due to poor policy-making." Argentina is the IMF's largest debtor country. The possibility of a peronist victory led towards the market reacting with fear, resulting in the peso depreciating and the central bank having to spend a billion dollars to maintain the currency in its bandwidth. The market risk index surged due to this reaction.

By June 2025 foreign inflows of cash grew constrained in Argentina falling 54% in 2024, and as of April 2025 stands at a $3 billion deficit.

In September 2025, the possibility of Milei losing the midterm elections sent shockwaves throughout the Argentine market, leading towards intervention by the central bank. U.S. Secretary Scott Bessent's announcement that a 20 billion dollar swap line for Argentina was ready halted the market meltdown, leaving it in a fragile state. Milei's attempt on stabilizing the currency has led towards an increase in purchasing power, which Argentines have exploited by travelling abroad. This has cost the government billions.

Shortly after Milei's strong performance and victory in the 2025 legislative elections, the Argentinian bond market surged, with dollar notes due in 2035 having increased by 23% in one day. Argentina's risk index plummeted by 40% (1081 to 652) in the same day.

Seeing the relative stability of Argentina's economy post elections, US banks revisited the deal for a 20 billion dollar swap, downsizing it to 5 billion dollars.

==== GDP ====
In the first and second quarter of 2024, Argentina's GDP contracted by 2.1% and 1.8%. However, in the last quarter, it expanded 3.9%, despite the significant austerity implemented by the President. Conversely, agriculture rebounded dramatically from a severe drought, achieving an impressive growth rate of 80.2% as conditions improved. The economy of Argentina is projected by the BBVA to grow by 5.5% in 2025, and by Goldman Sachs by 3.5% and 4.5% by the Argentine central bank, as inflation stabilizes and investment starts pouring in, due to Milei's liberalization of the economy. The financial improvements seen in the 3rd quarter of 2024 are complemented by society's renewed confidence in the government, creating a positive outlook for 2025. Economic activity during January 2025 returned to levels not seen since July 2022, trended to increase. The volume of real loans towards the private sector is at an all-time high in both dollar and peso denominations. GDP has proven difficult to increase under austerity, with economists revisioning their 2025 forecast for growth to 5% as the economy shrank by 0.1% in May of the same year.

Moody's have increased Argentina's rating from 'Ca' to 'Caa3' due to the reforms initiated by President Milei.

According to CNN, Argentina's stock index MERVAL soared by 22% one day after Milei's victory in the legislative elections of 2025, indicating significant trust in the Argentine government's ability to continue its liberalizing reforms.

=== Foreign policy ===
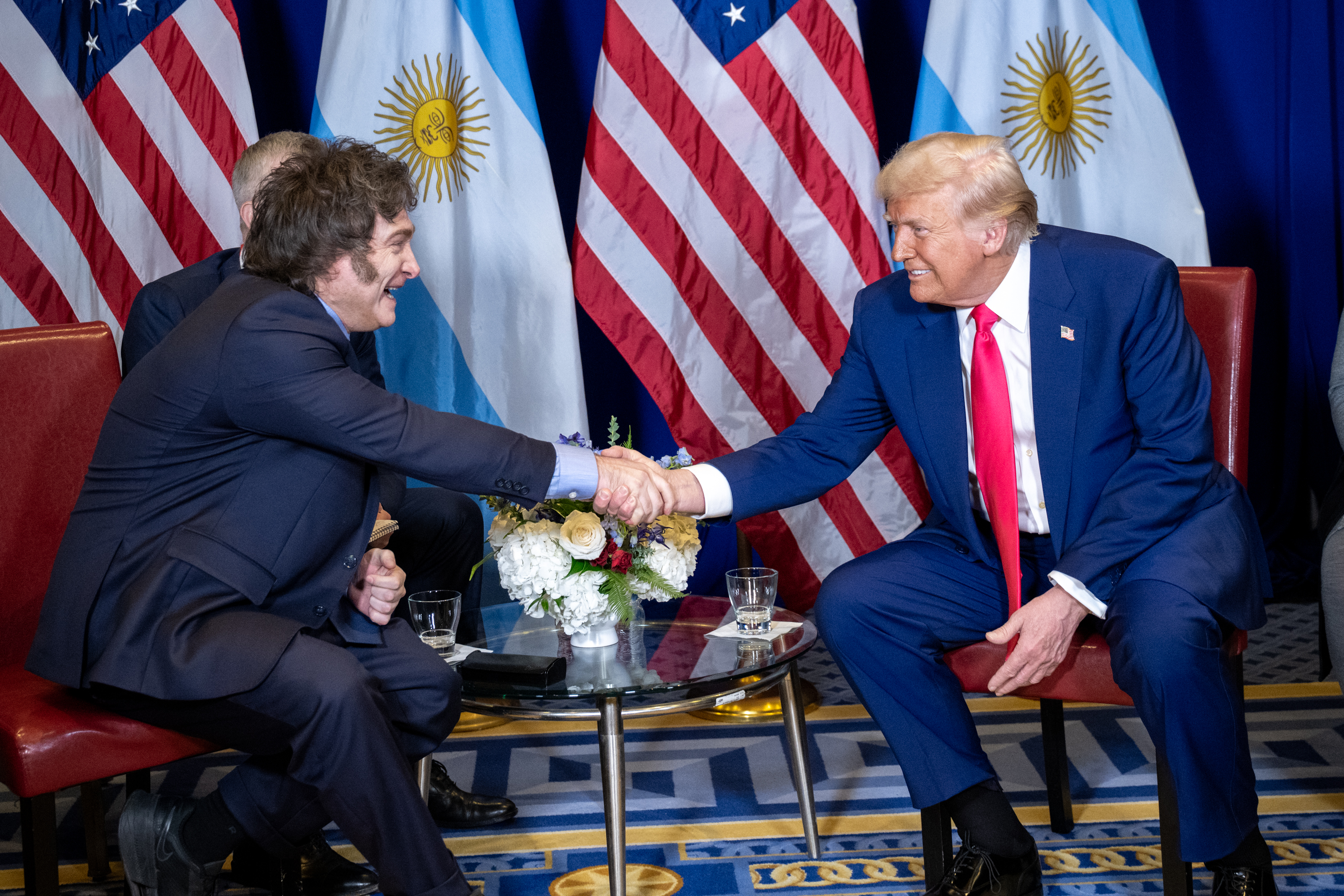
Milei shaking hands with Donald Trump in February 2025

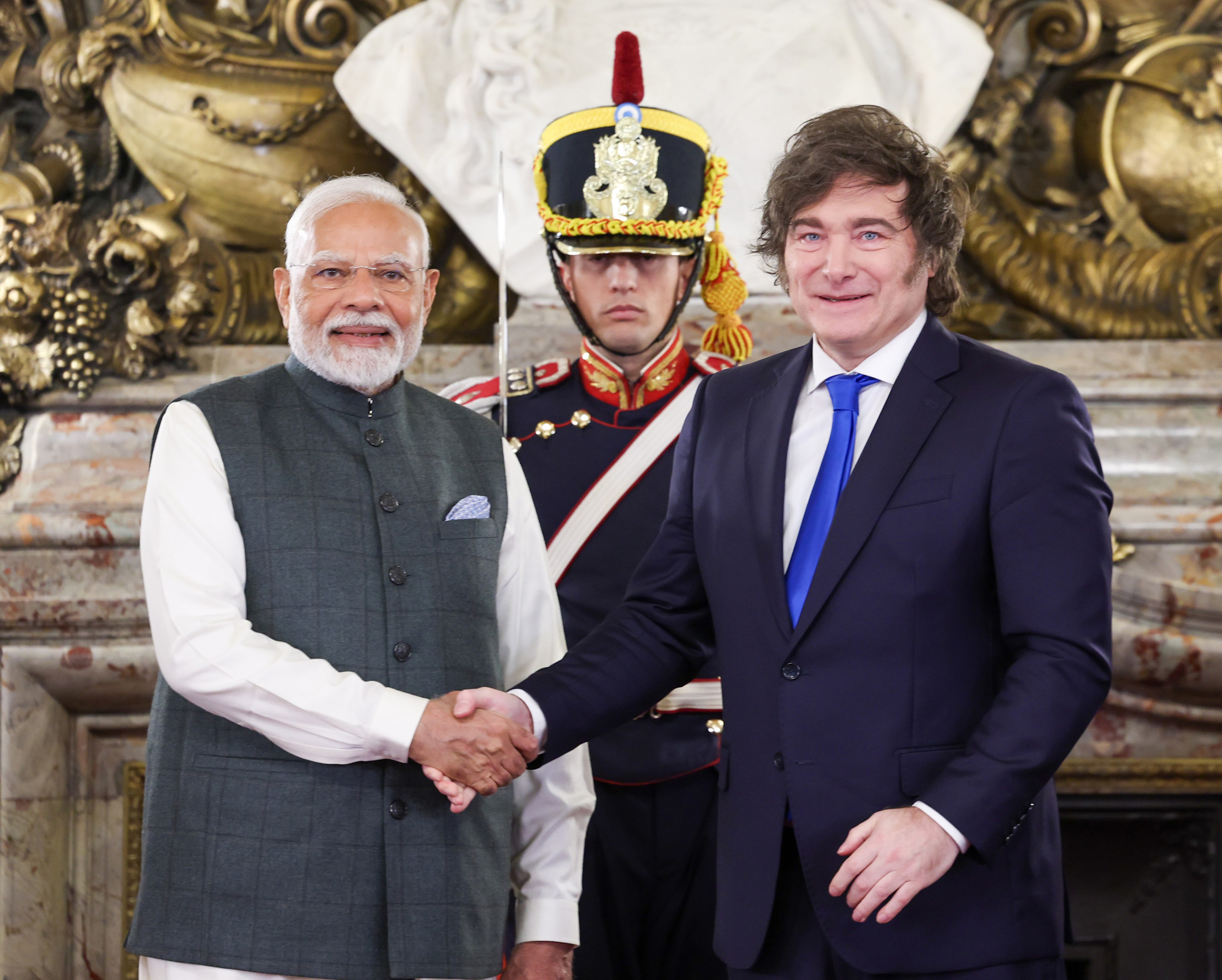
Milei with Indian prime minister Narendra Modi in July 2025

Milei made a radical change to Argentina's traditional foreign policy, aligning Argentina with the United States and Israel. Some analysts, like Ayelén Oliva of the BBC News or Walter Schmidt of Clarín, have compared his rapprochement to these countries to President Menem's similar policies in the 1990s.

Milei's views on the Russian invasion of Ukraine had distanced him from other right-wing figures. He first supported Ukraine in its defense against Russia, and sent military helicopters to Ukraine during the first months of his presidency. Milei also cooled relations with Russia, and has considered sending more lethal aid to Ukraine. However, since the change in U.S. administration in 2025, Milei's government started backing U.S.-led peace efforts.

During the Gaza war, Milei was a fierce supporter of Israel, vowing his "unwavering" support. Among his measures in support of Israel, Milei declared Hamas as a terrorist organization in July 2024, and ordered the Argentine delegation at the UN to vote against the incorporation of the State of Palestine into the United Nations. In February 2024, Milei visited Israel and went to a kibbutz that had been attacked by Hamas militants during the October 7 attacks. After the confirmation of the deaths of Bibas family (who were Argentine citizens kidnapped by Hamas), Milei declared two days of national mourning upon the return of the family's bodies on 21 February 2025.

In Latin America, Milei dismissed the results of the 2024 Venezuelan presidential election as "fraudulent" and called on Nicolás Maduro to resign. On 7 August 2024, Argentina became one of the first nations to recognize Edmundo González as the legitimate President of Venezuela. Milei also met with U.S. Secretary of State Marco Rubio during the second inauguration of Donald Trump and reaffirmed the intention to continue to pressure Maduro to exit power. As a result of the ensuing tensions, Venezuela ordered Milei's arrest and Argentina ordered Maduro's arrest.

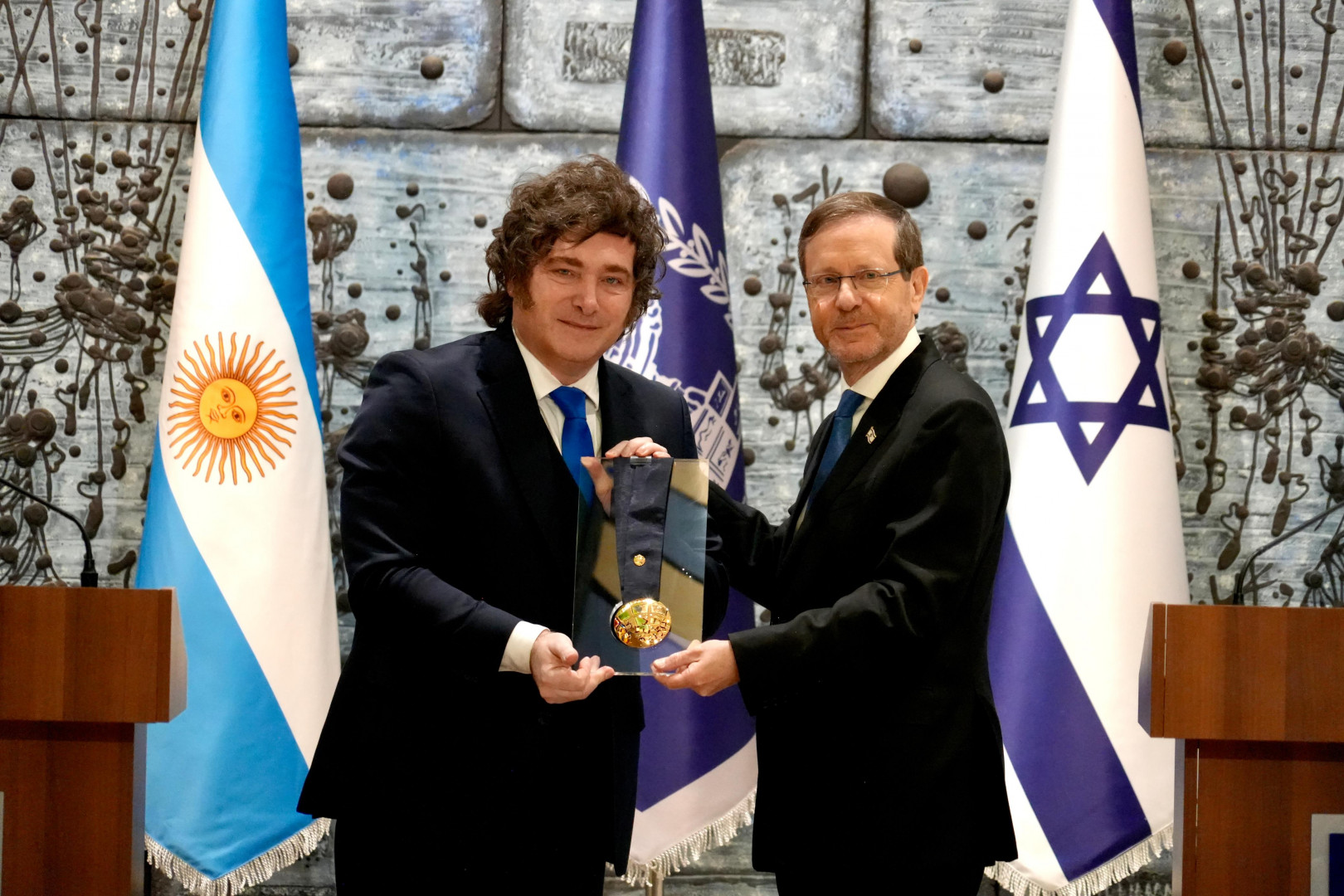
Milei receives the Israeli Presidential Medal of Honour from Israeli President Isaac Herzog during Milei's visit to Israel in April 2026

Milei has expressed discontent or strong ideological differences with China, even threatening to cut ties with China during his presidential campaign. In the immediate aftermath of Milei's electoral victory, the government of Taiwan congratulated Milei and said that Taiwan would seek to strengthen ties with Argentina. Moreover, it was rumored in December 2023, that then Foreign Minister Diana Mondino had held a meeting with a Taiwanese official, raising suspicions of Taiwanese financing of Milei's presidential campaign. In response to these allegations, China's ambassador to Argentina Wang Wei issued a statement reaffirming the principle of a One-China, adding that Taiwan is an "inalienable part of China" and an internal affair as well. Following threats by the Chinese government to stop buying soy and meat from Argentina in response to perceived ties between the two governments, the Argentine government clarified that there were no official contacts between Argentine and Taiwanese officials. In January 2026, Milei said that his position on China has not changed, adding that trade agreements and other contacts with China respond to "pragmatic reasons" and not to ideological changes about the Chinese government.

Milei is also a strong opponent of the Communist Party of Cuba and Cuban government, calling First Secretary of the Communist Party of Cuba Miguel Díaz-Canel "despicable" and referring to Cuba as a "prison island". In October 2024, Milei fired foreign minister Diana Mondino after she failed to vote for the US embargo on Cuba at the UN, later assuring that Argentina condemns the "Cuban dictatorship". Milei has also condemned other leftist leaders in the region, calling Colombian President Gustavo Petro a "murderous terrorist" and Brazilian President Lula da Silva "corrupt" and "communist". In July 2024, Milei had a diplomatic confrontation with Bolivian President Luis Arce over the 2024 Bolivian coup attempt, which Milei dismissed as "false" and orchestrated by Arce himself.

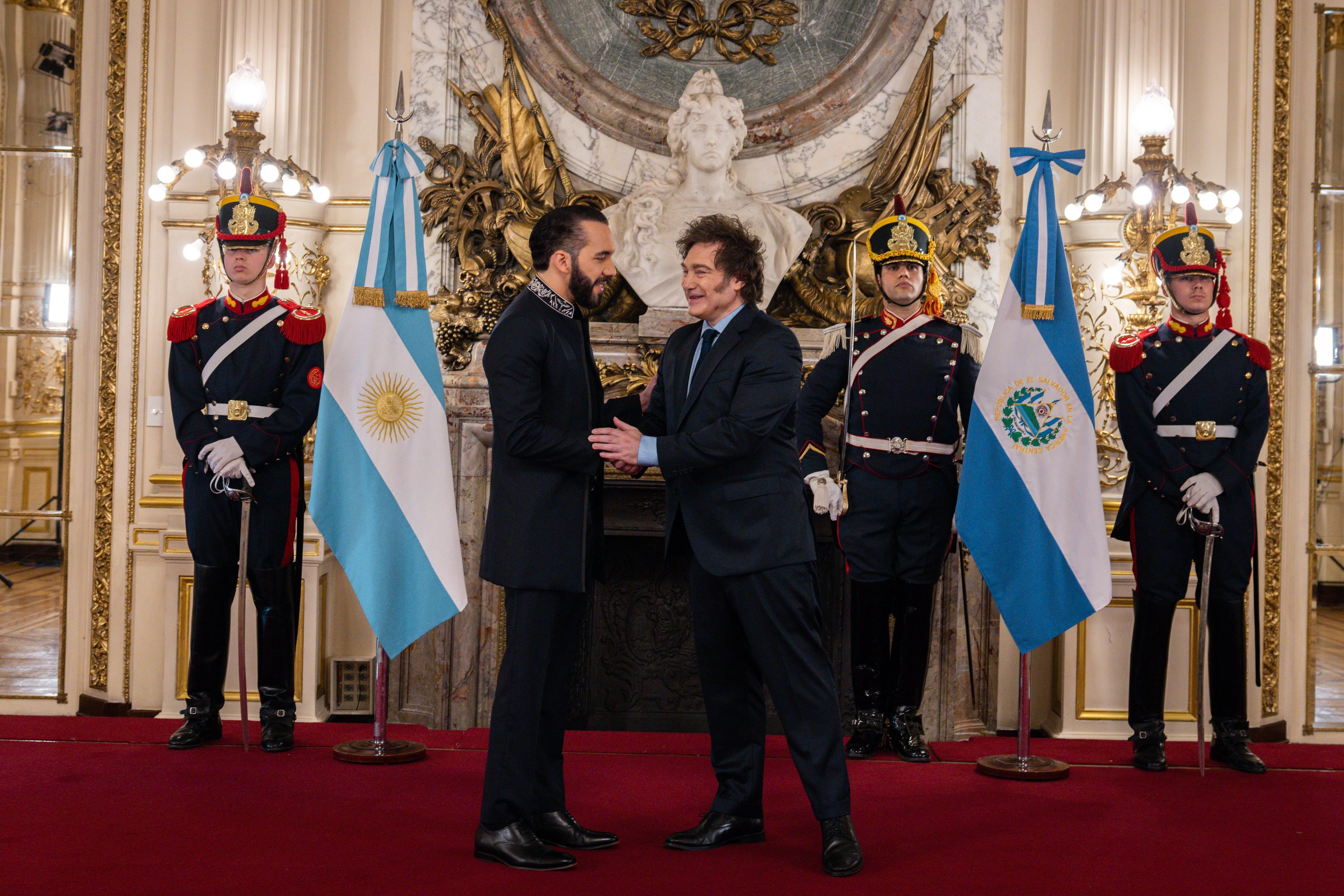
Javier Milei and Salvadoran President Nayib Bukele.

Milei enjoys a friendly personal relationship with former Brazilian president Jair Bolsonaro and U.S. president Donald Trump, and attended Trump's second inauguration as president in January 2025 in Washington. Similar to Trump's first measures, Milei expressed intention to withdraw Argentina from the Paris Accord and the World Health Organization (WHO), saying that the government is studying the possibilities of suspending Argentina's memberships. Argentina subsequently announced, on 5 February, that it would withdraw from WHO, citing "deep differences" with the organization. On 27 May 2025, during a meeting with US Secretary of Health and Human Services Robert F. Kennedy Jr. in Buenos Aires, Milei ratified Argentina's withdrawal from WHO, accusing the organization of basing its positions on political interests and bureaucratic structures while refusing to review what he claimed were mistakes. Argentina finalized its exit from WHO on 17 March 2026.

The relations between Argentina and Spain drastically deteriorated under President Milei, a staunch opponent of Spanish Prime Minister Pedro Sánchez. Milei strongly rejects the PSOE and has called Spain a socialist as well as a failed country. In August 2026, Milei stated that "the end of socialism gets closer," making a reference to the migrant crisis in Ceuta as a result of the crossing of over 60,000 illegal immigrants into the Spanish territory.

In October 2025, Milei and the government of Argentina signed the nomination of Donald Trump for the 2025 Nobel Peace Prize, which was later won by Venezuelan opposition leader María Corina Machado. Milei congratulated her for "fighting against the narcodictatorship in Venezuela".

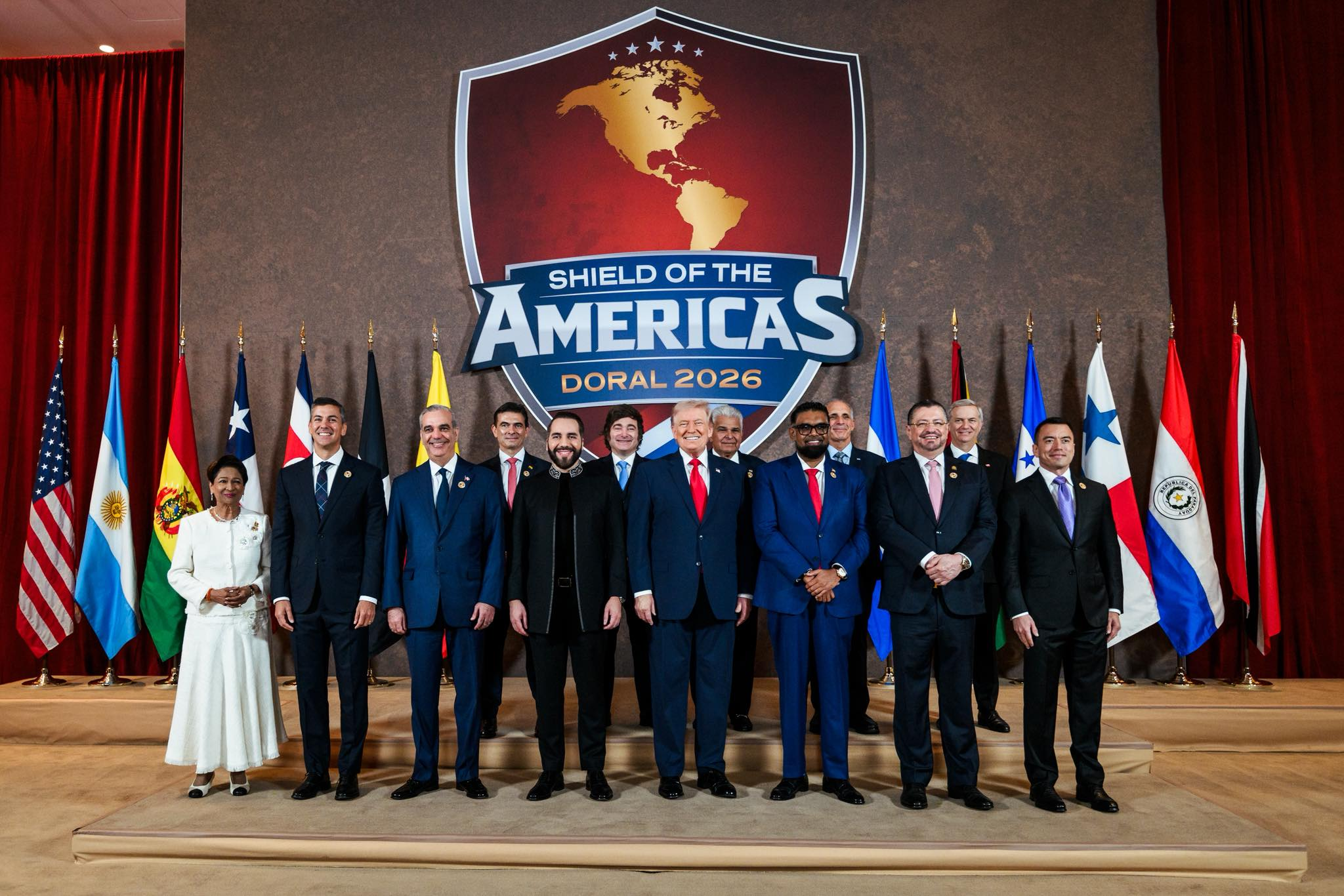
Milei at the Shield of the Americas summit in March 2026

That same month, Milei ordered to vote in favor of the US embargo on Cuba. It was the first time in history that Argentina supported the blockade, voting along six other countries: the US, Israel, Hungary, Paraguay, North Macedonia, and Ukraine. In January 2026, Milei celebrated the capture of Nicolás Maduro on social media, posting on X: "liberty advances, ¡Viva la libertad, carajo!". In a later interview, Milei expressed support for the US taking charge of the oil industry in Venezuela, which Milei said will "cut supply to communists."

Milei's approach to Israel includes moving the Argentine embassy from Tel Aviv to Jerusalem; he made a state visit to Israel on 6 February 2024, in which he announced plans to relocate the embassy. On 11 June 2025, while addressing the Knesset, Milei confirmed that Argentina would effectively move its embassy to Jerusalem. Milei met with Israeli FM Gideon Sa'ar in November 2025, announcing that he planned a trip to Israel between April and May 2026 to officially inaugurate the Argentine embassy in Jerusalem, with FM Pablo Quirno making a previous trip to formalize the move in February. In January 2026, it was reported that the government had paused its plans to relocate the embassy pending the resolution of Israeli business in the Falkland Islands. However, Milei reactivated the move of the embassy in April 2026, intending the officialize the decision on a visit to Israel that month.

In January 2026, Milei signed a decree officially designating the Quds Force of Iran's Islamic Revolutionary Guard Corps (IRGC) as a terrorist organization over the crackdown on Iranian protests. Following the outbreak of the Iran war with U.S.–Israeli strikes on Iran in February 2026, Milei celebrated the assassination of Ali Khamenei, accusing Khamenei and the Islamic government of sponsoring terrorist acts like the AMIA bombing. Milei has stated that Iran is an enemy of Argentina, citing past terrorist attacks on Argentine soil allegedly supported by the Iranian regime. He has also supported attacks on Iran and since February 2026, his government adopted a policy of total support for Israel and the United States in the Iran war, promoting Israel as a defender of Judeo-Christian values and Western civilization. In March 2026, Milei referred to himself as the "most Zionist president in the world." In April 2026, Milei made his third state visit to Israel. He was honored as one of the 14 torchbearers in the national Israeli Independence Day ceremony.

Milei's support for Israel made him the first non-Jew to receive the Genesis Prize, dubbed the "Jewish Nobel" in 2025. Milei's $1 million award supported the idea of creating the Isaac Accords to deepen ties between Israel and Latin America.

=== Cryptocurrency scandal ===
In February 2025, Milei publicly promoted the cryptocurrency $LIBRA, a meme coin, on his X account; the coin suffered a disastrous price drop shortly afterwards. Commentators have said that it could have been a rug pull. The resulting controversy was dubbed Cryptogate by the media. The Economist called it the "first big scandal" of Milei's presidency.

In response, opposition politicians in Congress called for Milei's impeachment, and a group led by Claudio Lozano, the leader of the opposition Popular Unity party, filed charges of fraud against Milei. However, the initiative does not have enough supporters in the Impeachment Commission to proceed with the proposal. Milei conceded that promoting the coin was a mistake on his part, noting that he did not participate in its development. However, reports suggest close associates of Milei, Mauricio Novelli and Manuel Terrones Godoy, were in touch with LIBRA's creator Hayden Davis, who was responsible for the launch of the token. Novelli was reported to have accepted bribes in exchange for providing access to the president and having facilitated the president's promotion of the token; although there is no evidence that Milei was aware of this. Milei and his government have defended him and said that he regularly promotes private Argentine ventures and projects online on his X account to attract investments and create jobs; and will continue to do so. One government official described Milei as the scam's biggest victim and said that he was cheated. Because of the rug pull, Milei ordered the Anti-Corruption office to determine whether any improper conduct occurred by any member of the national government, including himself. However, this office is part of the executive branch, and its director was placed in office by Milei. Milei's lawyer stated that Milei's behaviour "does not constitute any crime, due to the lack of intention". Milei also stated in an interview that he would seek legal advice from Mariano Cúneo Libarona, the minister of justice, an action seen as an acknowledgement that the promotion was an official action as president. However, he also argued that the "volatility traders" who lost funds understood the risks involved.

=== Job approval ===
Javier Milei's approval rating has been volatile throughout his presidency, coinciding with scandals, the state of the economy, improvement and deterioration and elections. Milei's victory in the elections of 2023 were not due to widespread approval of his ideas or policies, but moreso as a form of protest against the establishment parties.

In a Gallup poll on 10 December 2024, the approval ratings for Milei were around 50%, with trust in the government having doubled since 2023. The perception of the economic situation and the standard of living has also improved, with 53% of Argentines believing that their standard of living is now better, reaching the same high as 2015. 41% believe the economy of their city is also improving, reflecting a more optimistic view of Argentina. However, 69% of Argentines believe that it is a bad time to look for a job in this economy, while 35% do not have enough money for food, although these figures are a modest decrease from their two-decade high in 2019. 59% of the richest 20%, but only 39% of the poorest 20% approve of Milei's governance, though the ratings are still higher across the socioeconomic board when compared to Milei's predecessor, Alberto Fernández.

Through 2024 in to March 2025, Milei's approval rating declined from 49% to 47% with his disapproval numbers rising from 48% to 49%. His two predecessors, Alberto Fernández and Mauricio Macri saw a 50% to 28% and 72% to 45% drop during the same periods in office. The issues cited most commonly by respondents were the current IMF negotiations and the handling of the Bahia Blanca natural disaster.

The corruption scandal revealed in August 2025 had a profound impact on Milei's approval rating, shifting from a steady 48% just a month before to 39%. In late August, local outlets released audio recordings that allegedly captured a high-ranking government official talking about bribes and implying that Karina Milei, the president's sister and chief of staff, was receiving kickback payments. Javier Milei has rejected the claims as false, while Karina has not publicly addressed them. His supporters have claimed that his opponents, the Peronists and Kirchnerists have framed or otherwise. Despite the scandal Milei's party, La Libertad Avanza remains as one of the most popular parties in Argentina.

On 25 September 2025, the approval rating for Javier Milei was at an all-time low of 32.1%, largely due to the Jose Espert's — La Libertad Avanza's lead candidate for the Chamber of Deputies in Buenos Aires Province — ties to drug traffickers being exposed as well as the economic crisis of September 2025. Despite disapproval ratings soaring, Milei's party attained a larger than expected victory in the legislative elections of 2025. According to political scientist Carlos Fara, the rejection of Peronism “carried more weight” than the recent political and corruption scandals surrounding Milei's government, the run on the peso and “the fatigue with the President’s leadership style." This was reflected in the low turnout of 67 percent, the lowest figure since 1983 in a country with compulsory voting.

By late November 2025, his approval rating jumped between 42.6% and 49%. Men have a significantly more positive image of Milei than women. As of late May 2026, Milei's approval rating increased to 40%, while disapproval ratings fell from 63% compared to the previous months to 58%.

According to a poll by AtlasIntel, conducted for Bloomberg News, Milei's approval ratings have dropped to 37.1% by August 2026. As the years go by there is an increasing divergence, where most people who were undecided on the matter have picked a side. There is a trend of increasing skepticism and opposition towards the president, initially occurring in June 2025 but temporarily cushioned after his victory in the midterm elections of 2025. 62.4% of the Argentinian population disapproves of Milei's presidency.

== Political positions ==
Milei advocates minimal government, focusing on administering justice and ensuring security, with a philosophy rooted in life, liberty, and property, and free market principles. He criticizes socialism and communism, advocating economic liberalization and restructuring of government ministries. He opposes Argentina's Central Bank and current taxation policies.

Economically, Milei is influenced by the Austrian school, and admires former President Carlos Menem's policies. He supports capitalism, viewing socialism as embodying envy and coercion. Milei proposes reducing government ministries and addressing economic challenges through spending cuts and fiscal reforms, criticizing previous administrations for excessive spending. He has praised the monetary policies of former British prime minister Margaret Thatcher, and called her "a great leader".

Milei opposes abortion and euthanasia, and supports privatization in education and health care. He opposes mandatory vaccination, and supports drug legalization and the legalization of prostitution. As a supporter of the right to keep and bear arms, Milei advocates for the deregulation of firearm ownership, and proposes immigration restrictions for criminals. In foreign policy, Milei criticizes the IMF, opposes trade unions, aligns with anti-socialist figures of the Americas like Donald Trump and Jair Bolsonaro, and prioritizes alliances with the United States and Israel. Milei has disputed the estimated death toll of the Dirty War, and removed funding for special prosecutors, claiming it violates the country's constitution. He had been critical of relations with China because of its communist ideology during his presidential campaign, but he came to see China as a business partner in the first year of his presidency. He supports Ukraine against Russia in the latter's ongoing invasion. He opposes the transgender rights movement, and what he calls a "cult of gender ideology". He repealed the decree that established a job quota for transgender people in the public sector.

Milei advocates for dialogue with the United Kingdom over the Falkland Islands sovereignty dispute. In May 2024, he indicated, for the time being, his general acceptance of the Falkland Islands' status as a British Overseas Territory, accepting that it could take decades for Argentina to regain control of them. Though asserting that Argentina would not "relinquish [our] sovereignty" over the islands, Milei said he would not "seek conflict with the United Kingdom", preferring to resolve the dispute "within the framework of peace".

Javier Milei has adopted a strongly pro-Israel foreign policy stance since taking office. According to Reuters, his administration has expressed intentions to strengthen diplomatic relations with Israel, and re-orient Argentina's foreign policy closer to Israeli positions. Milei has considered relocating Argentina's embassy from Tel Aviv to Jerusalem, a move that would align Argentina with a small number of countries recognizing Jerusalem as Israel's capital. He is one of the most pro-Israel leaders in Latin America, particularly following his election and subsequent diplomatic engagements with Israeli officials.

== Public image ==
Milei has cultivated a complex and controversial public image marked by a blend of populist, right-wing libertarian, and conservative ideologies. Known for his ultra-liberal economic views and right-wing populist rhetoric, Milei's political stance has been subject to various interpretations by international media and political commentators. His rise to prominence during the 2023 presidential campaign, fueled by his primary win, sparked widespread attention, as did his central bank abolition and dollarization proposals.

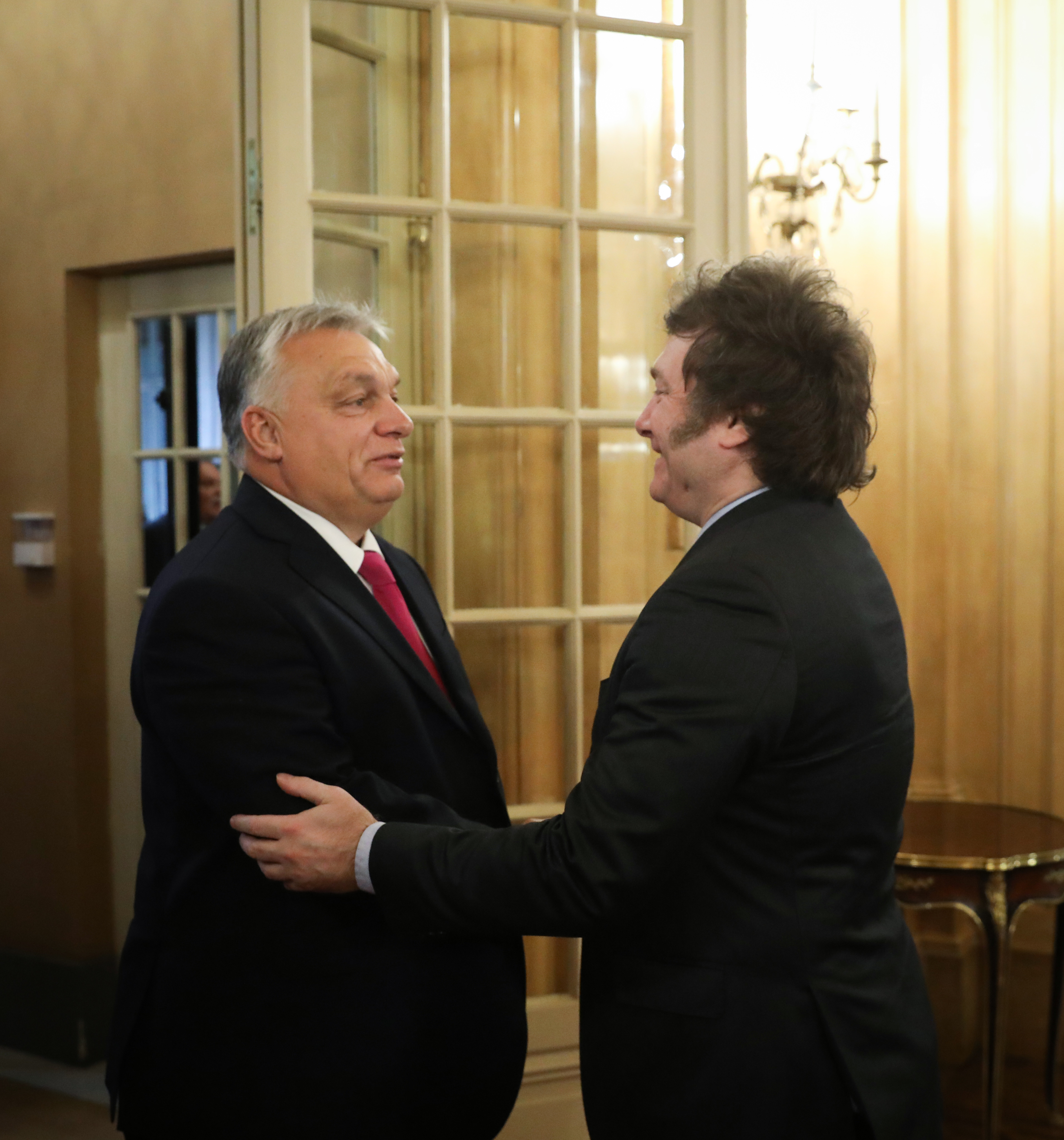
Milei with Hungarian Prime Minister Viktor Orbán

Milei is known for his flamboyant personality, distinctive personal style, and strong media presence, which sometimes causes controversy, and his embrace of conspiracy theories, including the Cultural Marxism conspiracy theory. He has also called the idea of climate change as an anthropogenic phenomenon "a socialist lie" and said that concerns about it are nothing more than "deceptions promoted by the neo-Marxists", as are those related to the attempts to overturn the 2020 United States presidential election. Echoing Donald Trump, he also claimed electoral fraud ahead of the 2023 presidential runoff. Like other right-wing populists, his rhetoric focuses on opposing what he calls "the political caste". Milei's party was criticized for including among his candidates apologists for the National Reorganization Process. During his political career, Milei has also been involved in several investigations and has been accused of having a violent attitude toward journalists and critics, as well as of misogynistic behavior, including toward women in journalism.

Milei is a cosplayer with a superhero persona called "General AnCap". He also champions free love. In addition to being nicknamed el Peluca ("The Wig") for his eccentric hair, which has been compared to that of Trump and fellow right-wing populists Boris Johnson and Geert Wilders, Milei is known as el Loco ("The Madman"). News outlets have likened him to both Trump and Wolverine. His admirers also call him "The Lion" because of the lyrics of the song "Panic Show" by rock band La Renga, which he sings in his public acts, coupled with his looks (in particular, his long hair). Time named him one of the 100 most influential people in the world in 2024 and 2025.

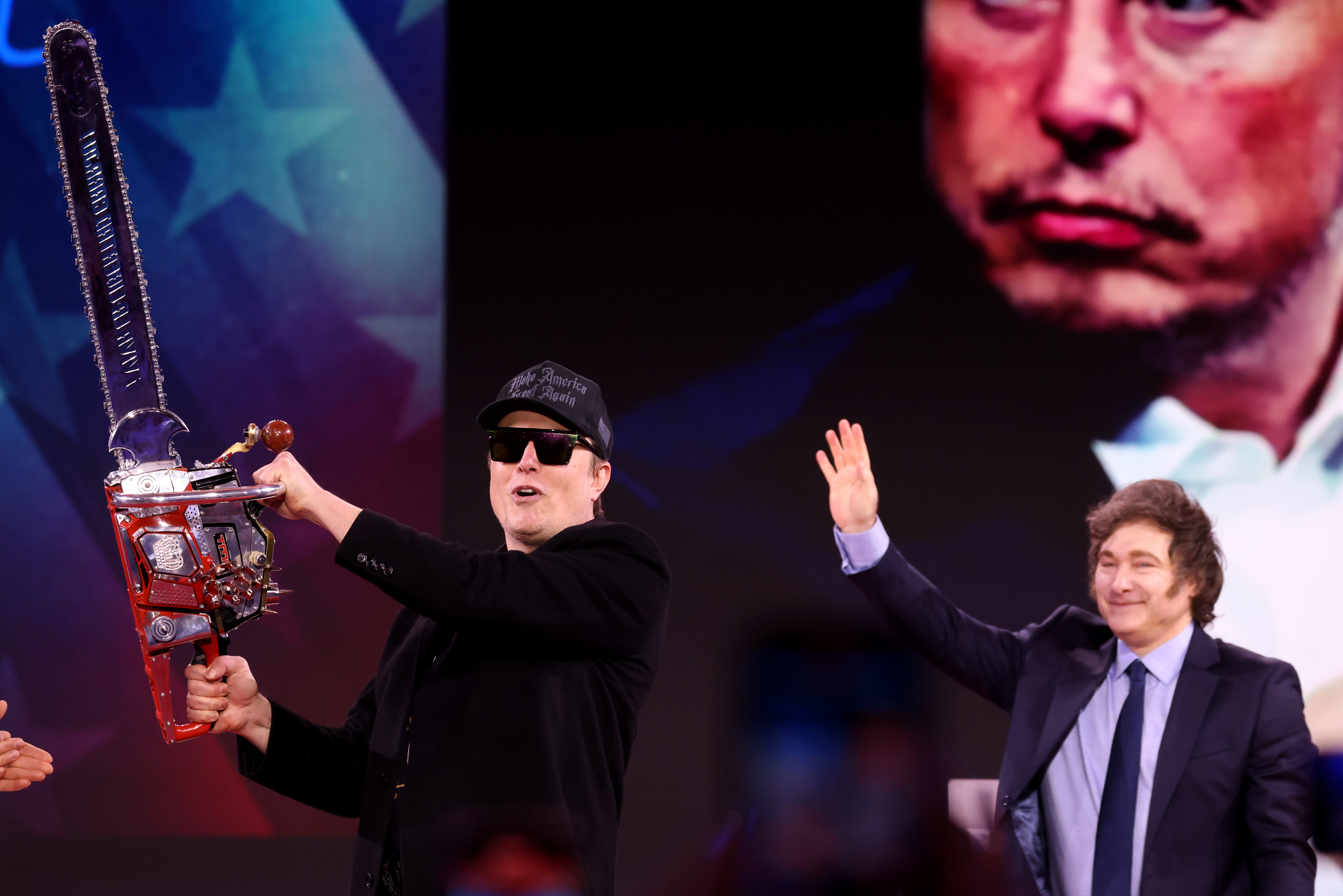
Milei with Elon Musk holding a chainsaw; the chainsaw has become a popular symbol associated with Milei.

The chainsaw has become an enduring and popular symbol associated with Milei (he has been called the "chainsaw candidate"), specifically symbolizing his "cutting" of regulations, bureaucracy, and red tape in Argentina. Some commentators have called Milei's economic policy of cutting regulations "chainsaw economics". Milei's supporters often carry chainsaws at rallies, symbolizing "his promise to cut down the size of the state". Milei is also well known for his phrase "¡Viva la libertad, carajo!", which is uttered most especially at the end of various speeches given by him.

== Honours and awards ==
- Spain:
  - Community of Madrid:
    - International Medal of the Community of Madrid (20 June 2024)
- Ukraine:
  - Order of Liberty (25 June 2024)
- Israel:
  - Presidential Medal of Honour (20 April 2026)
- Brazil:
  - São Paulo:
    - Order of Ipiranga (25 July 2026)

=== Other ===
Milei was awarded the 2025 Genesis Prize in recognition of his support of Israel. He was also awarded an honorary doctorate from Bar-Ilan University in 2026. Time named him one of the 100 most influential people in the world in 2024 and 2025.

== Personal life ==
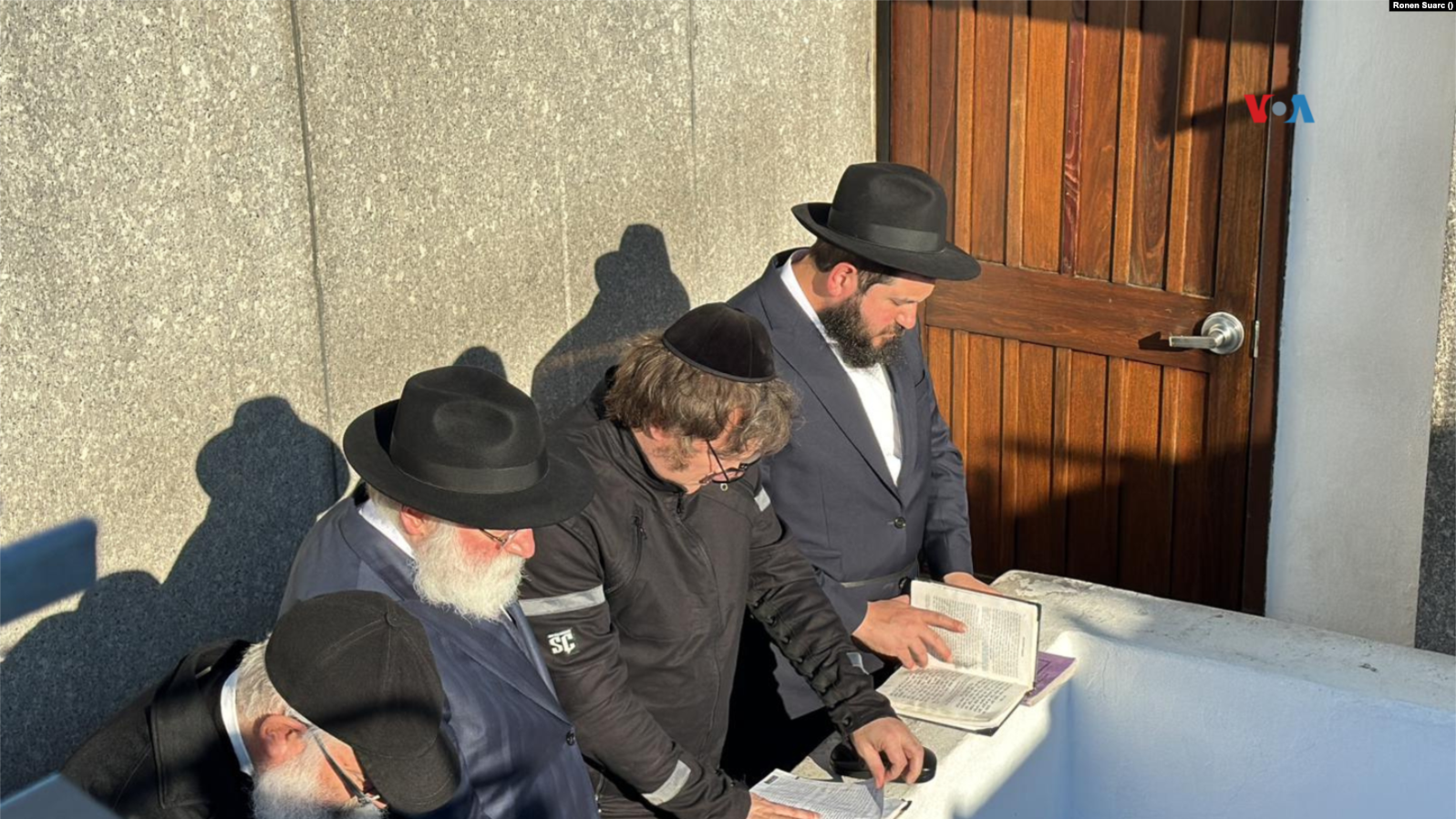
Milei (center) praying at the grave of Menachem Mendel Schneerson on 27 November 2023

Milei is unmarried, and, while he was a presidential candidate, said that, if elected, he would have his sister take the role of First Lady of Argentina. However, in December 2023, after winning the presidency, he announced that his government would not have a first lady. He called the role "anachronistic", and declared that this decision was taken after discussions with both his sister and his girlfriend, actress Fátima Flórez. Milei originally announced he was dating Fátima Florez in August 2023. Previously, he dated singer Daniela Mori.

While raised Catholic, Milei had been critical of the Catholic Church under Pope Francis, and his disparaging comments about Francis attracted criticism from Catholics. Conversely, Milei would later embrace Francis after meeting him, stating in a Retequattro interview, "I had to reconsider some positions, and starting from that moment, we began to build a positive relationship." Milei also reads the Torah daily, and has visited the grave of Orthodox rabbi Menachem Mendel Schneerson. Before November 2023, Milei said he had contemplated converting to Judaism, but that observing the Jewish Sabbath could pose challenges if he became president. Upon being elected president, it was reported that Milei intended to convert to Judaism. Milei has confessed that he professes a "fanaticism" for Judaism.

Milei owns five cloned English Mastiffs, their progenitor being Conan, who died in 2017 after suffering from spinal cancer. He considers Conan his son (a form of pet humanization), and has named four of Conan's six clones, including one named after the original and another named Angelito, Milton (in honor of Milton Friedman), Murray (in honor of Murray Rothbard), Robert, and Lucas (both named after Robert Lucas, Jr.). Milei said that he cloned Conan because he understands cloning as "a way of approaching eternity". To do this, he went to a clinic in the United States. The process cost him about $50,000. He has called his dogs his "four-legged children", and thanked them after his electoral win. Milei commented that one day, there was a fire at his building, while he was watching TV, which he realized because Conan made for the balcony. He escaped with him, using the emergency ladder, and took him to the vet, who gave oxygen to Milei because he was developing symptoms of cyanosis.

Milei is an avid fan of association football. Albeit having played for Chacarita Juniors in his early adulthood, he has stated to be a supporter of Boca Juniors; in a 2024 interview with Radio Mitre, Milei said, "I am a member and fan of Boca. If investment groups come and put a fortune for us to win all the time, where do I sign?" However, he has expressed criticism of the presidency of Juan Román Riquelme at the club since 2023, stating that his "management at Boca is a disaster", and referred to Riquelme as "a Kirchnerist running the club". Milei is a huge fan of the English rock band The Rolling Stones.

In December 2024, while holding the office of Head of State, Milei applied for, and was granted, Italian citizenship via jus sanguinis, under the government of Prime Minister Giorgia Meloni.

== Electoral history ==
=== Executive ===
Electoral history of Victoria Villarruel
Election	Office	List	Votes			Result	Ref.
Election	Office	List	Total	%	P.	Result	Ref.
2023 1-R	President of Argentina	La Libertad Avanza	8,034,990	29.99%	2nd	→ Round 2	
2023 2-R	President of Argentina	La Libertad Avanza	14,554,560	55.65%	1st	Elected	

=== Legislative ===
Electoral history of Javier Milei
Election	Office	List	No.	District	Votes			Result	Ref.
Election	Office	List	No.	District	Total	%	P. (Note: Presented on an electoral list. The data shown represents the share of the vote the entire alliance received in that constituency.)	Result	Ref.
2021	National Deputy	La Libertad Avanza	1	City of Buenos Aires	313,808	17.04%	3rd	Elected	

== Radio ==
Year	Programme	Radio	Ref.
2017–2023	Demoliendo mitos (Demolishing Myths)	Conexión Abierta	

== Publications ==
=== Books ===
- — (2014). Lecturas de Economía en tiempos de Kirchnerismo [Economic Readings in Times of Kirchnerism] (in Spanish). Grupo Unión. ISBN 978-987-3773-00-6.
- — (2014). Política Económica Contrarreloj [Economic Politics Against the Clock] (in Spanish). Ediciones Barbarroja. ISBN 978-987-45133-2-8.
- — (2015). El retorno al sendero de la decadencia Argentina [The Return to the Road of Argentine Decadence] (in Spanish). Grupo Unión. ISBN 978-987-3677-18-2.
- —; Giacomini, Diego (2016). Maquinita, Infleta y Devaluta [Money Printer, Inflation and Devaluation] (in Spanish). Grupo Unión. ISBN 978-987-3677-44-1.
- — (2017). Otra vez sopa: maquinita, infleta y devaluta: ensayos de economía monetaria para el caso argentino [Soup Again: Money Printer, Inflation, and Devaluation. Monetary Economy Essays for the Argentine Case] (in Spanish). Ediciones B, Grupo Zeta. ISBN 978-987-627-814-0.
- — (2018). Desenmascarando la mentira Keynesiana. Keynes, Friedman y el triunfo de la Escuela Austriaca [Unmasking the Keynesian Lie: Keynes, Friedman, and the Triumph of the Austrian School] (in Spanish). Grupo Unión. ISBN 978-84-7209-727-8.
- —; Giacomini, Diego (2019). Libertad, libertad, libertad [Liberty, Liberty, Liberty] (in Spanish). Galerna. ISBN 978-950-556-739-3.
- — (2020). Pandenomics. La economía que viene en tiempos de megarrecesión, inflación y crisis global [Pandenomics: The Coming Economy in Times of Mega Recession, Inflation, and Global Crisis] (in Spanish). Galerna. ISBN 978-950-556-779-9.
- — (2022). El camino del libertario [The Path of the Libertarian] (in Spanish). Planeta Argentina. ISBN 978-950-49-7456-7.
- — (2023). El fin de la inflación. Eliminar el Banco Central, terminar con la estafa del impuesto inflacionario y volver a ser un país en serio [The End of Inflation: Eliminate the Central Bank, End the Inflation Tax Scam, and Return to Being a Serious Country] (in Spanish). Planeta Argentina. ISBN 978-950-498-171-8.
- — (2024). Capitalismo, socialismo y la trampa neoclásica [Capitalism, socialism and the neoclassical trap] (in Spanish). Planeta Argentina. ISBN 978-847-20-9916-6.

=== Journal articles ===
- — (January 2004). "Real Exchange Rate Targeting. ¿Trilema monetario o control de capitales? La política fiscal" [Real Exchange Rate Targeting: Monetary Trilemma or Capital Control? Tax Policy]. Revista de Economía y Estadística (in Spanish). 42 (2). National University of Córdoba, Faculty of Economic Sciences, Institute of Economics and Finance: 63–87. doi:10.55444/2451.7321.2004.v42.n2.3807. ISSN 0034-8066. S2CID 154116264.
- — (2014). "De los picapiedras a los supersónicos. Maravillas del progreso tecnológico con convergencia" [From the Flintstones to the Jetsons: Wonders of Technological Progress with Convergence]. Revista Actualidad Económica (in Spanish) (83). National University of Córdoba, Faculty of Economic Sciences, Institute of Economics and Finance: 5–18.
- —; with Diego Giacomini (2017). "Ensayos monetarios para economías Abiertas. El caso argentino" [Monetary Essays for Open Economies: The Argentine Case]. Revista Actualidad Económica (in Spanish) (91). National University of Córdoba, Faculty of Economic Sciences, Institute of Economics and Finance: 5–24.

Party political offices
New political party	Libertarian Party nominee for President of Argentina; 2023	Most recent
New political alliance	La Libertad Avanza nominee for President of Argentina; 2023	Most recent
Political offices
Preceded by Alberto Fernández	President of Argentina; 2023–present	Incumbent
Order of precedence
First	Order of precedence of Argentina as President	Succeeded by Victoria Villarruel as Vice President
