= Capitalismo, socialismo y la trampa neoclásica =

Argentine book by Javier Milei

- Author: Javier Milei
- Language: Spanish
- Genre: Economy
- Publisher: Planeta
- Publication date: 1 May 2024
- Publication place: Argentina

Capitalismo, socialismo y la trampa neoclásica ("Capitalism, socialism and the neoclassical trap") is a 2024 book by Argentine president Javier Milei.

== Publication ==
Capitalismo, socialismo y la trampa neoclásica is the 18th book by Javier Milei, and the first one written and published during his first term as President of Argentina.

The book had a first edition of 5000 units, released in time to be available at the 2024 Buenos Aires International Book Fair. It was followed by a second edition of 2000 books, and a third one also of 2000 books. The initial project was to present it at the Book Fair, but this was not done. Milei reported that the organizers of the fair were openly hostile to him, to the point that they may sabotage the presentation and even allow violent actions against it.

The book was presented in a performance at the Luna Park, which started with Milei singing the song "Panic Show" of La Renga, alongside a rock band created for the moment. Milei frequently uses a lion as a symbol of his personal image, and the lyrics of the song (which is not political) describe a lion. Milei had frequently used such stunts during his 2023 presidential campaign. After it, the event continued as a traditional explanation of the contents of a book being launched. He criticized those who complain about monopolies generated by business practices, but do not reject with equal force state-owned monopolies.

== Content ==
The book makes a strong defense of free market policies and rejects any form of market intervention, as those would inevitably lead to socialism. The book dismisses the concept of market failures: such failures would actually be a difficulty in the economic system to take into account all the nuances of the real world, and trying to "fix" them would be a doomed effort to accommodate reality to the economic doctrine, instead of reformulating it to reflect those circumstances. In special, the author points that neoclassical and neokeynesianist economists refuse to accept that their economic doctrines do not work, and instead abuse of alleged market failures to explain the failures of their economic doctrines.
