= ¡Viva la libertad, carajo! =

Spanish-language catchphrase

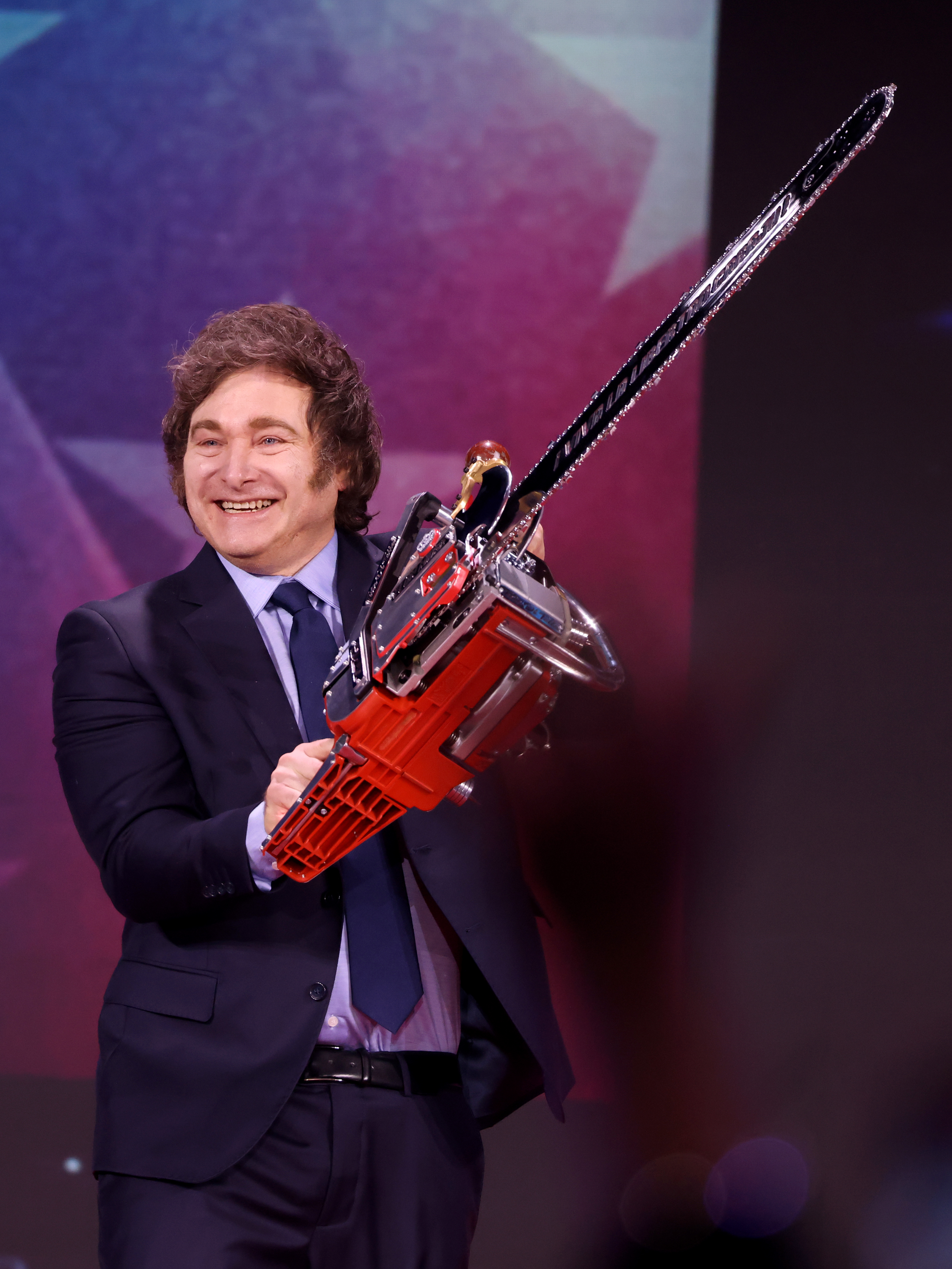
Javier Milei holding a chainsaw with the phrase engraved

¡Viva la libertad, carajo!, sometimes shortened to ¡VLLC!, is the catchphrase of Javier Milei, president of Argentina since 2023. The phrase translates into English as "Long live freedom, damnit!", or "Long live freedom, goddamnit!"

== Origin and use ==
Previous to its popularization, the phrase was said for the first time by writer and journalist Osvaldo Bayer in a documental video of Encuentro in 2012. It was inspired by "¡Viva Perón, carajo!" of the Peronist resistance during the years of proscription of Peronism (1955–1973).

A self-described anarcho-capitalist, Milei is known for his political antics, including wielding chainsaws as props, waving black-and-yellow flags associated with anarcho-capitalism, and using vulgar language. Milei first popularized "¡Viva la libertad, carajo!" during his parliamentary run in 2021 and then again in his 2023 presidential campaign. He most often uses it as a concluding phrase in his speeches. He has also used it in captions on his social media posts, such as photos with then-U.S. President-elect Donald Trump and actor and filmmaker Sylvester Stallone.

In 2024, a six-part docuseries about Milei titled ¡Viva la libertad, carajo! released.

At the 2025 Conservative Political Action Conference (CPAC), Elon Musk bore a chainsaw from Milei with the catchphrase engraved on the bar.

Israeli foreign minister Gideon Sa'ar posted the catchphrase after Israeli strikes on Evin Prison and Palestine Square Countdown Clock in the Twelve-Day War.

Following the capture of Venezuelan president Nicolás Maduro in a raid conducted by U.S. special forces in January 2026, Milei tweeted the phrase on Twitter.

== See also ==
- Come and take it
- Don't Tread on Me
- Give me liberty or give me death!
- Join, or Die
- Make America Great Again
- Life, Liberty and the pursuit of Happiness
- Live Free or Die
- Taxation as theft
