= El camino del libertario =

2022 book by Javier Milei

El camino del libertario (Spanish for "The Path of the Libertarian") is a 2022 book by Argentine economist and politician Javier Milei. Published by Planeta Group, the book is divided into three parts. It begins as an autobiography of Milei up to his candidacy as president of Argentina in the 2023 Argentine general election, a description of his ideas about several Argentine topics, and speeches and phrases said during the 2021 Argentine legislative election. It also includes comments of Karina Milei (his sister), economist Bertie Benegas Lynch, filmmaker Santiago Oría, and legislators Ramiro Marra and Victoria Villarruel.
