= 2017 Genesis Prize =

The 2017 Genesis Prize was awarded to British-Indian sculptor Sir Anish Kapoor. This was the fourth awarding of the Genesis Prize and the first to someone not American.

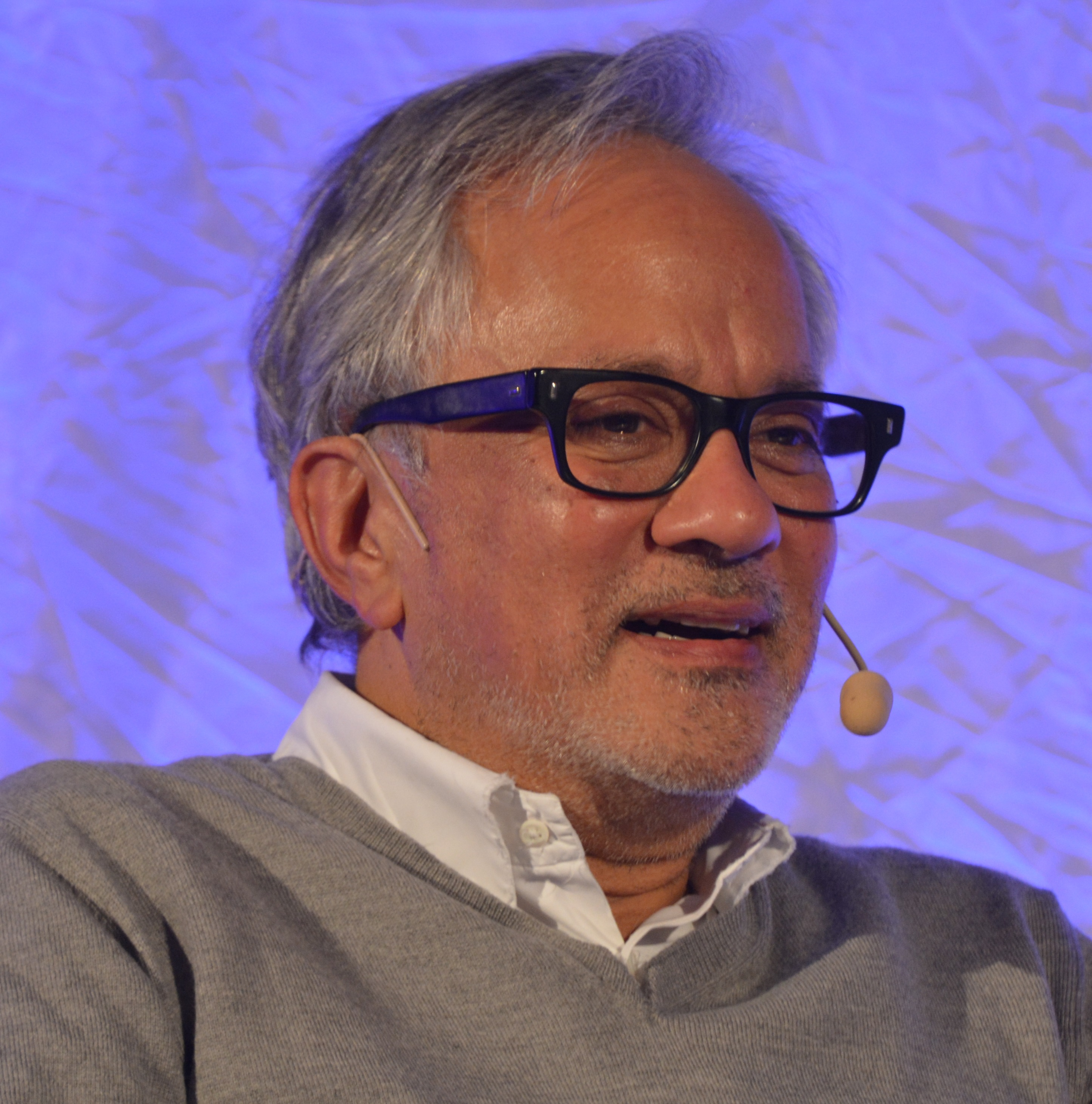
Anish Kapoor, winner of the 2017 Genesis Prize

== Background ==
Kapoor followed Genesis Prize Laureates Michael Bloomberg (2014), Michael Douglas (2015), and Itzhak Perlman (2016). Kapoor was chosen for being "one of the most influential and innovative artists of his generation".

== Ceremony ==
Due to the ongoing Syrian refugee crisis, the ceremony was cancelled. Kapoor and The Genesis Prize Foundation “agreed that in light of the escalating war in Syria and the resulting deterioration of the refugee situation there, it would be inappropriate to hold a festive ceremony to honor Mr. Kapoor and his work on refugee issues while children are being killed with chemical and other horrible weapons on Israel’s doorstep”.

== Aftermath ==
The $1 million prize that accompanies The Genesis Prize was given to organizations supporting refugees, a cause meaningful to Anish Kapoor. The first grant was made in collaboration with Morris Kahn for a program at Ziv Medical Center treating hearing loss among Syrian children. An additional five grants were provided to NGOs including the International Rescue Committee, the Multifaith Alliance for Syrian Refugees, HIAS, Help Refugees, and Hillel International.
