= 2026 Genesis Prize =

The 2026 Genesis Prize was awarded to Israeli actress and producer Gal Gadot for her support of Israel, her advocacy for Israeli hostages, and "her empathy for all innocent victims of this terrible war unleashed by Hamas" during the ongoing Gaza war.

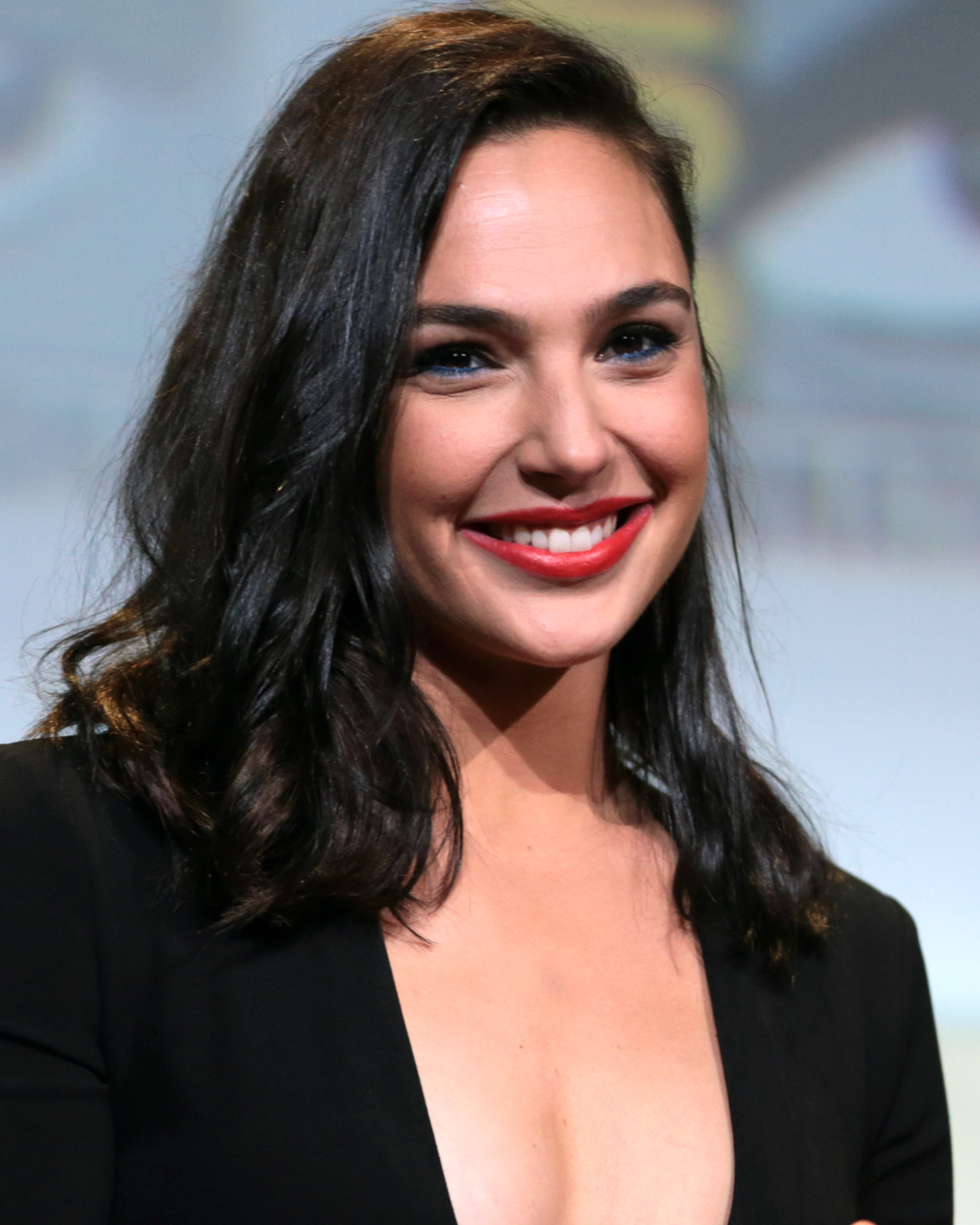
2026 Genesis Prize laureate Gal Gadot

== Background ==
In November 2025, Gadot was announced as the 2026 Genesis Prize laureate. Gadot had been shortlisted for the 2021 Genesis Prize, which was won by Steven Spielberg. Gadot is the third female to win the prize following fellow actresses Natalie Portman and Barbra Streisand.

== Aftermath ==
In the aftermath of the October 7 war, Gadot wanted to use the prize money to help Israelis heal, rebuild, and recover.

The $1 million prize was doubled to at least $2 million via a joint Genesis Prize Foundation-Jewish Funders Network matching-gifts program.

The money will be granted to Israeli NGOs, nonprofits, and professionals assisting Israelis in their recovery from trauma and mental health issues connected to the war.
