= Jewish Nobel Prize =

Jewish Nobel Prize may refer to:

- Genesis Prize, often referred to as the "Jewish Nobel Prize"
- List of Jewish Nobel laureates
