= 2016 Genesis Prize =

The 2016 Genesis Prize was awarded to Israeli-American violinist Itzhak Perlman. This was the third awarding of the Genesis Prize.

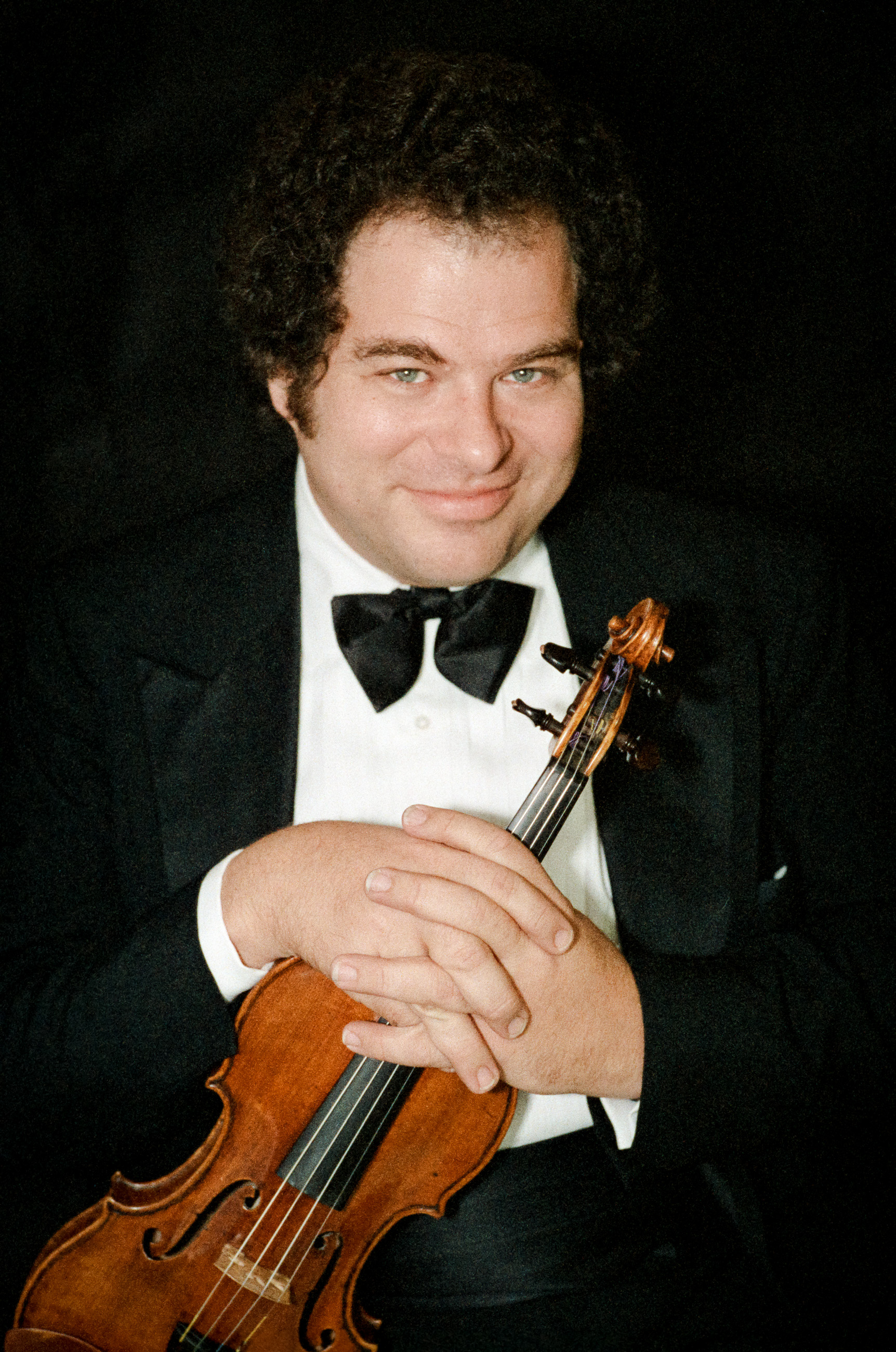
Itzhak Perlman third winner of the Genesis Prize

== Background ==
Perlman was awarded the Prize after Michael Bloomberg received it in 2014 and Michael Douglas in 2015. He was chosen for his "story of overcoming extraordinary personal challenges to excel as one of the world's great musicians and humanitarians."

== Ceremony ==
The prize giving ceremony took place at the Jerusalem Theater in June 2016. The ceremony was hosted by actress Helen Mirren. The prize was presented by Prime Minister Benjamin Netanyahu. The ceremony featured pieces performed by the Ra’anana Symphony Orchestra, as well as music played by Israeli graduates of the Perlman Music Program.

== Aftermath ==
The $1 million prize money was doubled after Roman Abramovich matched it. With this money, in Perlman's honor The Genesis Prize Foundation and Jewish Funders Network launched Breaking Barriers, a program to promote the inclusion of people with disabilities in all aspects of Jewish communal life. The Genesis Prize Foundation also collaborated with Matan-United Way in Israel to support a competition for funding that would go to organizations in Israel focused on supporting those with disabilities. Funds were also given to the Yiddish Book Center to support its work on Yiddish language instruction and oral history, the Tel Aviv Conservatory for a new Perlman-Genesis String Project, and a rehabilitation center in Herzliya for children and adults with impaired mobility.
