= 2018 Genesis Prize =

The 2018 Genesis Prize was awarded to Natalie Portman. Also in 2018 the first Genesis Lifetime Achievement Award was presented to US Supreme Court Justice Ruth Bader Ginsburg.

== Background ==
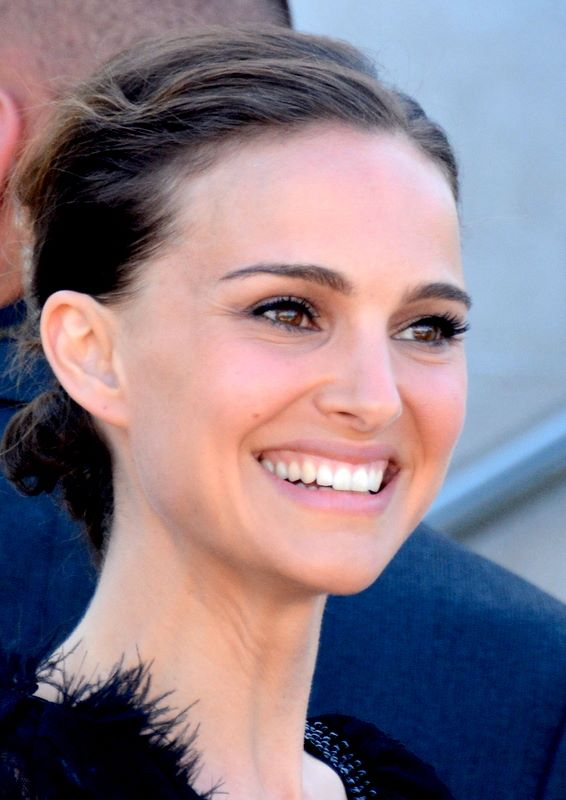
Natalie Portman 2018 Genesis Prize Laureate

In November 2017, it was announced that the Academy Award-winning Portman was the 2018 Laureate "In recognition of her commitment to social causes and deep connection to her Jewish and Israeli roots." 2018 was the first year that the prize was awarded to a female after previously being awarded to Michael Bloomberg, Michael Douglas, Itzhak Perlman, and Anish Kapoor. The $1 million prize money was doubled to $2 million after a donation from Morris Kahn. Following in the footsteps of previous winners who donated the prize money to charity, Portman said she would donate her award funds to philanthropic programs focused on women's equality, education, economic advancement, health, and political participation.

According to Haaretz, Ruth Bader Ginsburg was to be the only 2018 recipient. According to a committee source, actress Natalie Portman was added as a recipient after the Israeli Prime Minister's Office (PMO) learned that Israel Prime Minister Benjamin Netanyahu would have to publicly give the award to a critic of U.S. President Donald Trump. As consolation, Ginsburg was given a separate "Lifetime Achievement Award."

== Ceremony ==
In April 2018, it was announced that Portman declined to attend the prize ceremony because Netanyahu, was set to give a speech at the ceremony. She also cited distress over events in Israel (likely related to the Gaza border protests), leading to the ceremony's cancellation. Portman clarified that she was not boycotting Israel, stating, "I am not part of the BDS movement and do not endorse it. Like many Israelis and Jews, I can be critical of Israel's leadership without wanting to boycott the nation." She explained that she did not want to "appear as endorsing" Prime Minister Netanyahu, who was scheduled to speak at the ceremony.

== Ruth Bader Ginsburg - Lifetime Achievement Award ==
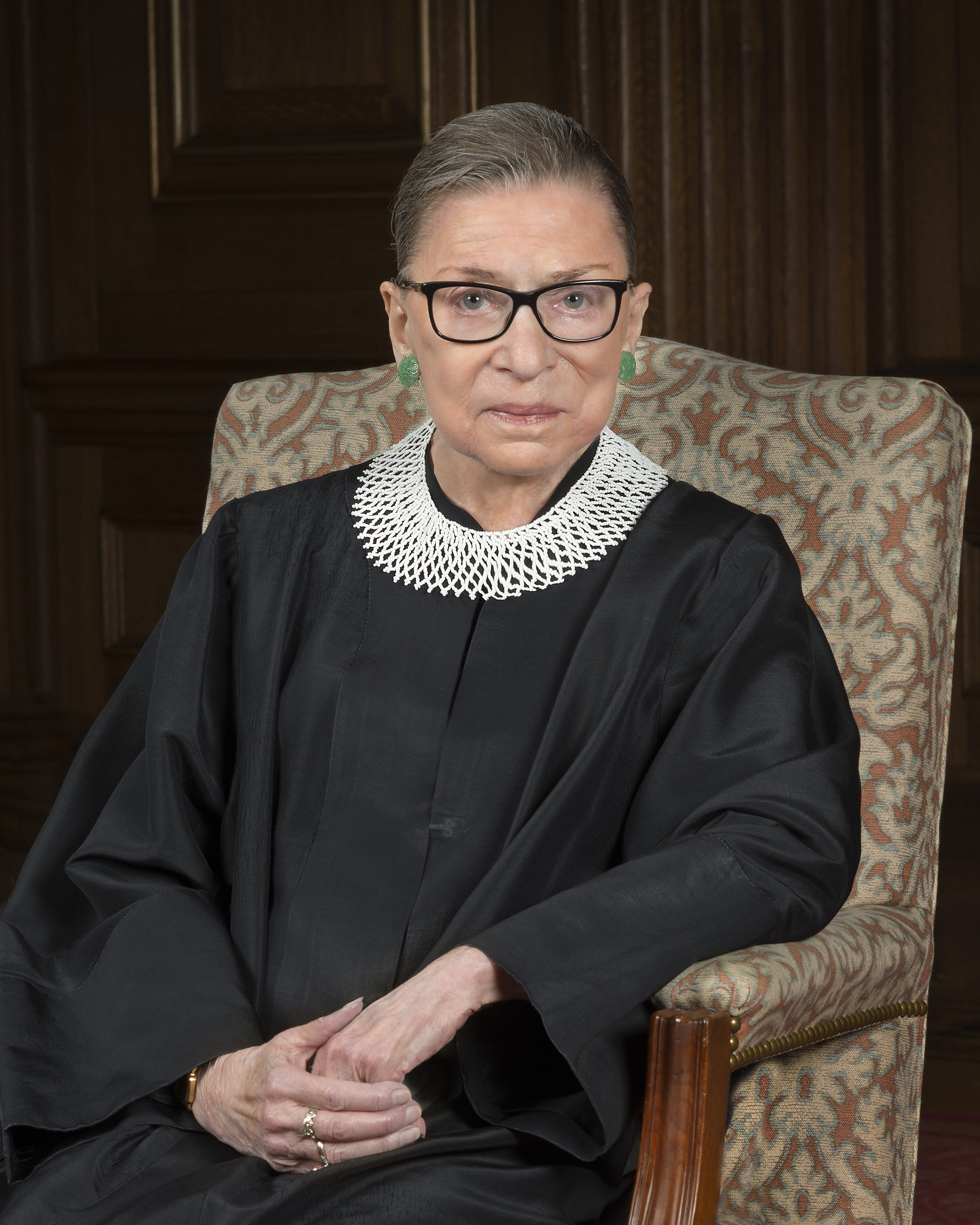
Ruth Bader Ginsburg, first Genesis Lifetime Achievement Award winner

In July 2018 a ceremony was held in Tel Aviv to honor the inaugural recipient of the Genesis Lifetime Achievement Award, U.S. Supreme Court Justice Ruth Bader Ginsburg for her work advancing women's equality. She was presented the award by former Israeli Supreme Court President Aharon Barak.

== Aftermath ==
As planned, the award funds were redirected to Israeli and North American NGOs working on women's rights.
