= 2022 Genesis Prize =

The 2022 Genesis Prize was awarded to CEO of Pfizer Albert Bourla for his work leading the pharmaceutical company that developed one of the first vaccines for COVID-19.

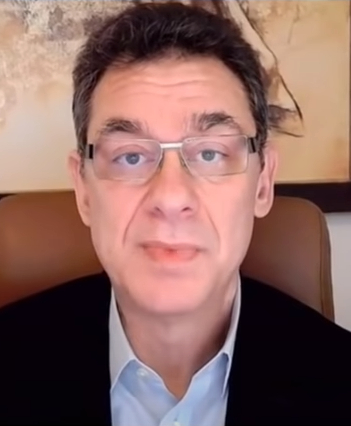
Albert Bourla, winner of the 2022 Genesis Prize

== Background ==
During the height of the COVID-19 global pandemic, the Genesis Prize Foundation facilitated an online nomination and voting process for the 2022 Genesis Prize, and Dr. Bourla received the largest number of votes, with 200,000 people from 71 countries participating. This was then unanimously endorsed by the membersof the Genesis Prize Selection Committee.

== Ceremony ==
The ceremony was held in June 2022. Conducted at the Jerusalem Theatre, Sarah Rafferty was the host while singers Yehuda Poliker and Shiri Maimon performed. The Russian-Ukrainian war had already started and there was a triibute to the Ukrainian people.

== Aftermath ==
Bourla directed the $1 million award towards the construction of the Holocaust Museum of Greece and along with the Foundation donated an additional $100,000 to Sons and Daughters of Jewish Deportees from France.
