= Albert Bourla =

CEO of Pfizer (born 1961)

- Άλμπερτ Μπουρλά
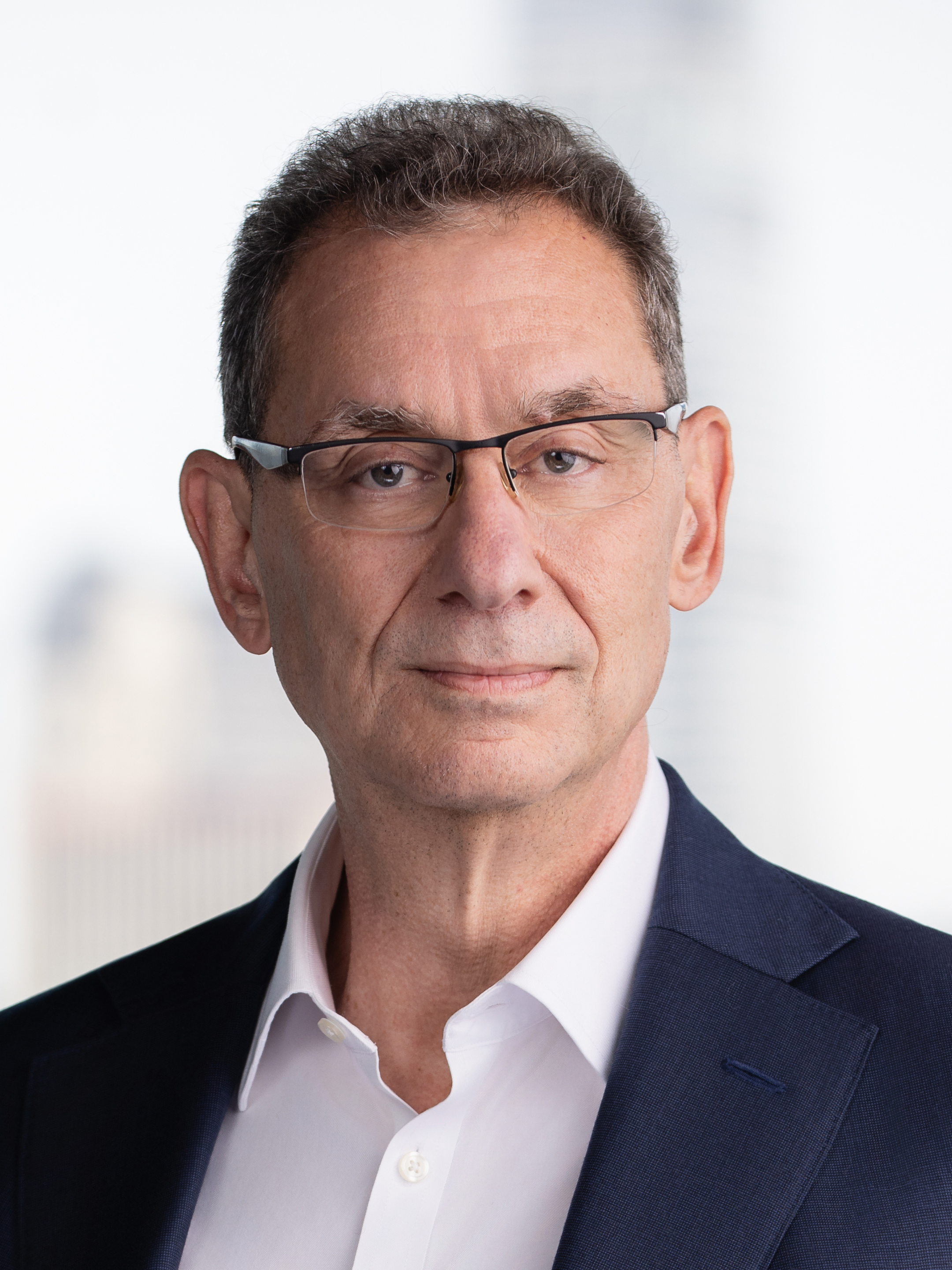
- Bourla in 2026
- Born: Άλμπερτ Μπουρλά; October 21, 1961 (age 65); Thessaloniki, Greece
- Education: Aristotle University of Thessaloniki (PhD, DVM)
- Employer: Pfizer
- Title: Chairman and CEO of Pfizer
- Board member of: Biotechnology Innovation Organization; Catalyst; Partnership for New York City; Pfizer; Pfizer Foundation; Pharmaceutical Research and Manufacturers of America
- Spouse: Myriam Alchanati
- Children: 2
- Honours: Golden Cross of the Order of the Redeemer
- Scientific career
- Fields: Pharmaceuticals
- Thesis: Effect of melatonin implants on the characteristics and on the freezability of Karagouniko ram semen (1991)

Albert Bourla (Greek: Άλμπερτ Μπουρλά; born October 21, 1961) is a Greek-American veterinarian and businessman known for serving as the chairman and chief executive officer of the pharmaceutical company Pfizer. He joined the company in 1993 and has held several executive roles across Pfizer's divisions. Prior to becoming chief executive officer, Bourla was chief operating officer.

In addition to chairing the boards of Pfizer and the Pfizer Foundation, Bourla is or has been on the boards of the Biotechnology Innovation Organization, Catalyst, the Partnership for New York City, and the Pharmaceutical Research and Manufacturers of America. He is also a member of The Business Council, American think tank the Council on Foreign Relations and the Business Roundtable.

Bourla reshaped Pfizer to focus on research and development.

Bourla was awarded the 2022 Genesis Prize for his leadership in the development of the Pfizer–BioNTech COVID-19 vaccine.

== Early life and education ==
=== Family history and the Holocaust ===
Bourla was born and raised in Thessaloniki, Greece. His parents, Mois and Sara, who were Sephardi Jews, were among the 2,000 of 50,000 Jews in Thessaloniki to survive the Holocaust; according to Bourla, his mother was allegedly minutes away from execution by firing squad when she was spared via a ransom paid to a Nazi Party official by her non-Jewish brother-in-law, while his father happened to be out of the Jewish ghetto when the residents were taken to the Auschwitz concentration camp and went into hiding, never to see his parents again.

Bourla has spoken with the Museum of Jewish Heritage in downtown Manhattan about his family's history and experience with the Holocaust. During a 2026 interview with CNN, Bourla said his mother's experience of being saved from the firing squad taught him and his sister "how life is miraculous" and "you don’t have to think things are impossible."

=== Education ===
Bourla earned a doctorate in veterinary medicine in 1985 and a Ph.D. in the biotechnology of reproduction at Aristotle University of Thessaloniki's School of Veterinary Science in 1991. Bourla's doctoral thesis (1991) is titled "Effect of melatonin implants on sperm characteristics and on the freezability of Karagouniki ram semen".

== Career ==
Bourla joined Pfizer in 1993, first as a doctor of veterinary medicine and technical director for the company's animal health division in Greece. He left Greece with his wife when he was 34 after a promotion within Pfizer and since then he has lived in seven different cities, in four different countries. In 2001, he immigrated to the United States.

Bourla held multiple executive roles at Zoetis (then known as Animal Health) and other divisions of Pfizer. From 2005 to 2009, he was area president for Animal Health's Europe, Africa and Middle East division. In 2009 and 2010, he oversaw the Europe, Africa, and Asia Pacific division. In the latter role, he managed the merger of Wyeth's Fort Dodge Animal Health business with Pfizer in these regions.

From 2010 to 2013, Bourla was president and general manager of Pfizer's Established Products Business Unit. There, he built business for the company's drugs that had recently lost patent exclusivity.

From January 2014 to January 2016, Bourla was group president of Pfizer's global vaccines, oncology, and consumer healthcare business, where he led Pfizer's work on cancer and heart drugs, among others, and helped launch Eliquis, an anticoagulant, and Ibrance, a breast cancer treatment drug.

From February 2016 to December 2017, he was group president of Pfizer Innovative Health. In 2016, during his tenure, Innovative Health's revenue increased by 11%.

Bourla became Pfizer's chief operating officer (COO) on January 1, 2018, overseeing the company's drug development, manufacturing, sales, and strategy.

He was promoted to chief executive officer in October 2018, effective January 1, 2019, succeeding Ian Read, his mentor. In an announcement shortly after taking the role, Bourla explained that Pfizer would focus on scientific and pharmaceutical innovation, divesting from non-core businesses and increasing research spending.

In February 2019, Bourla was one of seven CEOs in the pharmaceutical industry who participated in a hearing on prescription drug prices in the United States with the United States Senate Committee on Finance.

In January 2020, Bourla assumed the additional post of executive chairman, upon the retirement of Ian Read. Bourla received $21 million in compensation from Pfizer in 2020.

In 2020, Bourla pushed Pfizer employees for the fast development of a COVID-19 vaccine in partnership with German company BioNTech, making sure it is safe and effective. He told his team that "financial returns should not drive any decisions" with regards to the vaccine. He took the risk of producing the Pfizer–BioNTech COVID-19 vaccine before approval from the Food and Drug Administration so that it would be ready to ship immediately upon approval. During the COVID-19 pandemic, Pfizer's pricing strategy was called "war profiteering" by former CDC chief Tom Frieden.

In December 2021, the UK's Prescription Medicines Code of Practice Authority found that comments Bourla made to the BBC on vaccinating children aged 5 to 11 breached the pharmaceutical advertising code, though it overturned the more serious findings on the appeal.

In July 2022, Bourla restructured Pfizer by selling its stake in its consumer health care business, Haleon, during his tenure as CEO.

On March 8, 2022, Bourla authored Moonshot:Inside Pfizer's Nine-Month Race to Make the Impossible Possible, a book detailing Pfizer's role during the 2020 pandemic in developing the first COVID-19 vaccine. Moonshot was published by HarperCollins.

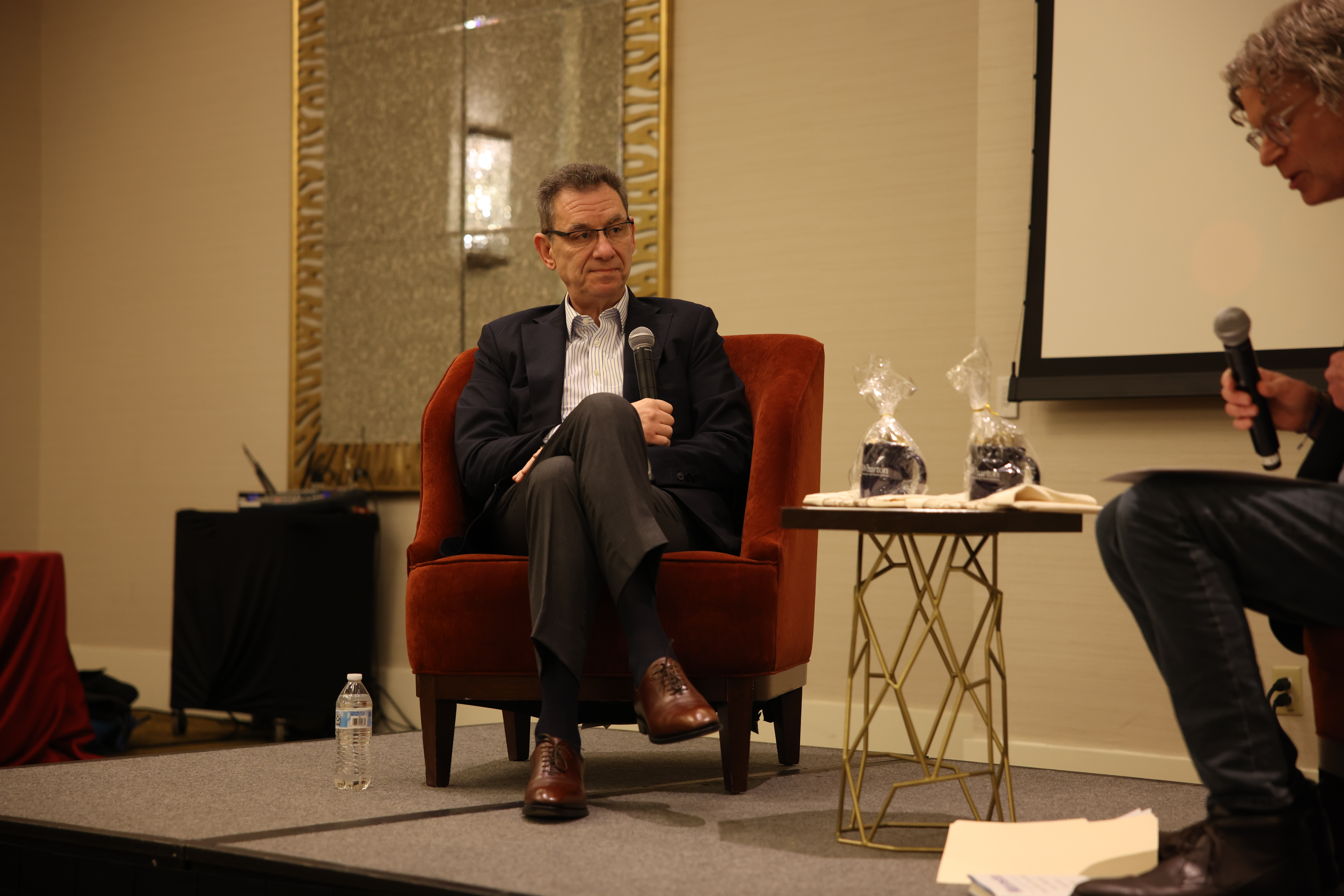
Bourla speaking at the Wharton School, 2024

In 2023, Bourla's total compensation from Pfizer was $21.5 million, representing a CEO-to-median worker pay ratio of 291-to-1. On March 13 2023, Bourla announced Pfizer's $43 billion acquisition of Seagen, an American biotechnology company. The acquisition was the largest of Bourla's tenure and approximately doubled Pfizer's early-stage oncology offerings by adding Seagen's antibody-drug conjugate (ADC) platform and four FDA-approved cancer medications. In November 2025, Bourla announced Pfizer's $10 billion acquisition of Metsera, a biopharmaceutical company that developed treatments for obesity and metabolic syndromes. Bourla stated plans to launch GLP-1 receptor agonist therapies by 2028.

Bourla is credited with refocusing Pfizer's vaccine division to focus on Staphylococcus, Clostridioides difficile infection, infant diseases and the Pfizer–BioNTech COVID-19 vaccine. According to a report from the National Journal, Bourla opposes government interference in pharmaceutical pricing, which he argues would hamper spending on development of new drugs.

== Other activities and politics ==
Bourla has been on the Health Section Governing board of the Biotechnology Innovation Organization, the largest biotechnology trade association worldwide. He joined Pfizer's board of directors in February 2018, and also is on the board of the Pfizer Foundation. Bourla is a board member of Catalyst, a global nonprofit organization promoting the advancement of women, and the Partnership for New York City,

Bourla was the chair of the Pharmaceutical Research and Manufacturers of America (PhRMA), a trade association representing companies in the pharmaceutical industry in the United States. Bourla concluded his role as chair in February 2026. Bourla has served as both vice president and president of the International Federation of Pharmaceutical Manufacturers and Associations. Bourla is also a member of the Council on Foreign Relations, an American think tank focused on United States foreign policy and international relations.

He is a supporter of the Aris Thessaloniki sports club. To benefit Greece, he has organized vaccine donations, medical aid for refugees, and given more than $1 million in medicine to help uninsured patients. He established the Pfizer Artificial Intelligence Center in his hometown, directed Pfizer's participation in the Thessaloniki International Fair, is close friends with Geoffrey R. Pyatt, the United States ambassador to Greece, and brought Pfizer's leadership team to Greece to meet with Prime Minister of Greece Kyriakos Mitsotakis.

After Bourla was awarded the 2022 Genesis Prize by Israeli President Isaac Herzog for his leadership in delivering the Pfizer–BioNTech COVID-19 vaccine, he directed the $1 million prize to go towards Holocaust education and the Holocaust Museum of Greece to be built in Thessaloniki. Bourla also earned a 2022 Double Helix Medal "for spearheading the rapid development of Pfizer’s COVID-19 vaccine".

Bourla has made political contributions to both Republicans and Democrats, particularly those who oppose controls on prescription drug prices in the United States.

Bourla is a member of The Business Council, an organization of business leaders headquartered in Washington, D.C., and the Business Roundtable, a group of chief executives of major U.S. corporations established to promote pro-business public policy.

In January 2023, Bourla was named co-chair of the board of directors for the Partnership for New York City (PFNYC). Bourla, along with Tishman Speyer CEO Rob Speyer, led a search committee to find a president and CEO for the PFNYC, eventually selecting former Jersey City mayor Steven Fulop.

In a meeting with New York City mayor Zohran Mamdani on July 15, 2025, Bourla defended Israel's military action in Gaza, according to attendees, and asked Mamdani to explain his defense of the phrase "globalize the intifada" in relation to the Gaza War.The mayor had explained his belief of the phrase as a slogan for Palestinian rights but acknowledged the pain the phrase caused Jewish people and pledged to discourage its use.

In 2026, Bourla was elected to the American Academy of Arts and Sciences.

== Recognition ==
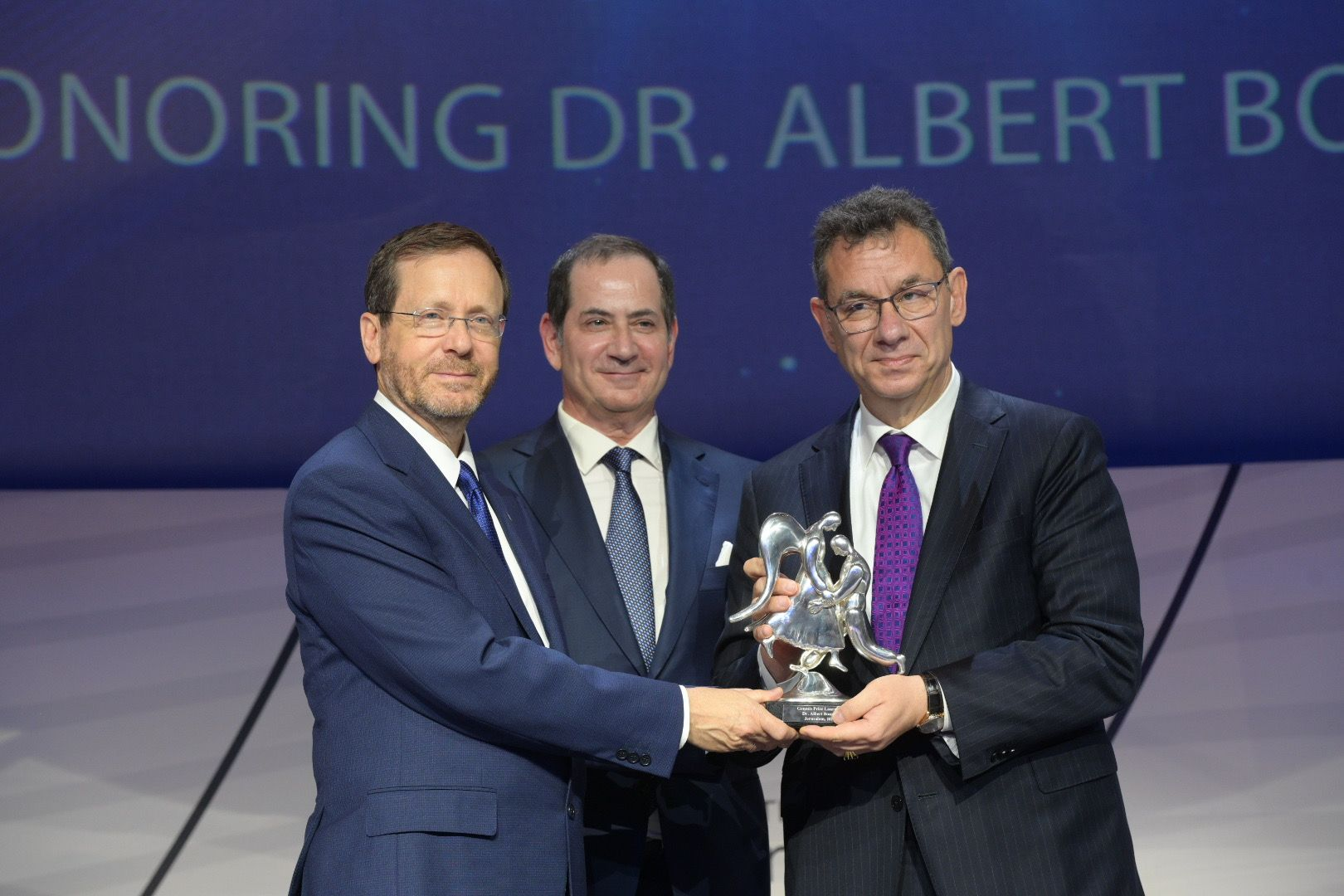
Israeli President Isaac Herzog presents the Genesis Prize to Bourla, 2022

In April 2019, at the Prix Galien Greece Awards ceremony, Bourla was presented with the award for "Preeminent Greek Leader" of the global pharmaceutical industry by Geoffrey R. Pyatt, United States ambassador to Greece.

In 2020, Bourla was ranked as America's top CEO in the pharmaceutical industry by Institutional Investor.

In 2021, Bourla was named by Carnegie Corporation of New York as an honoree of the Great Immigrants Award. That year, CNN Business named him CEO of the year, and he received the World Jewish Congress "Theodor Herzl Award" and the Galien Foundation "Roy Vagelos Pro Bono Humanum Award."

In January 2022, Bourla was awarded the $1 million Genesis Prize for his leadership in the development of the COVID-19 vaccine. The Genesis Prize is awarded annually to an individual for professional achievement, contributions to humanity and commitment to Jewish ethics.

In May 2024, Bourla was among the guests invited to the state dinner hosted by U.S. president Joe Biden in honor of President William Ruto at the White House.

In 2024, Bourla was named to the Time 100 list of most influential people in health and to Fortune magazine's list of the 100 most powerful people in business. That same year, Bourla received a 2024 Leadership Award from the nonprofit organization Concordia, which puts on the annual Concordia Summit, a global affairs forum. In April 2024, the American Association for Cancer Research gave Bourla and Pfizer its AACR Outstanding Achievement Award for Service to Cancer Science and Medicine.

== Personal life ==
Bourla and his wife live in Scarsdale, New York. He has two children: a daughter and a son.

Bourla maintains a home in Chalkidiki, which he visits every summer.
