= 2020 Genesis Prize =

The 2020 Genesis Prize was awarded to Natan Sharansky.This was the seventh awarding of the Genesis Prize. Sharansky requested that his $1 million award go to organizations helping the most vulnerable impacted by COVID-19.

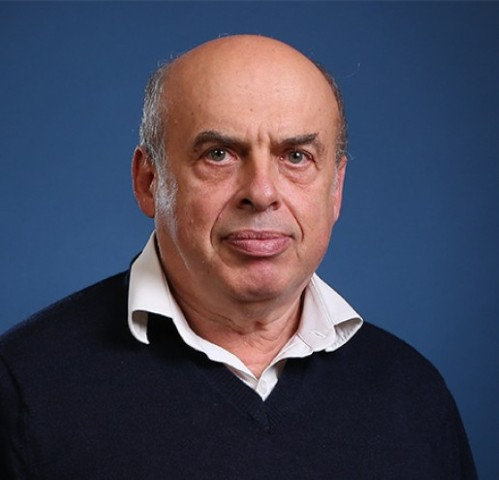
Natan Sharansky, winner of the 2020 Genesis Prize

== Background ==
Sharansky was honored in recognition of his life-long advocacy for human rights, democracy, service to the Jewish people and the State of Israel. Sharansky was the first Genesis Prize winner to reside in Israel.

== Ceremony ==
Given the ceremony occurred during the COVID-19 pandemic, it took place at the President’s House in front of a select audience.

== Aftermath ==
At the time, the world was in the midst of dealing with COVD-19. As such, Sharansky decided to donate his million dollar prize to help those impacted by it. He donated some of the money to the Weizmann Institute of Science for drug and vaccine research. Additionally, a competition for Israeli companies in the high-tech and biotechnology space was held, with the winners receiving grants from the funds awarded in Sharansky’s honor.
