= 2023 Genesis Prize =

The 2023 Genesis Prize was awarded to Jewish activists and NGOs supporting Ukraine following the 2022 Russian invasion of Ukraine. It was the first time the prize was awarded to a group and not a specific individual.

== Background ==
Following Russia’s invasion of Ukraine, many Jewish and Israeli organizations and individuals worked to help alleviate the suffering of the people of Ukraine. The Genesis Prize Committee chose to recognize their efforts with the prize.

== Ceremony ==
A typical ceremony was not held in 2023 but rather in 2025, to mark the third anniversary of the invasion, the various grantees assembled to share best practices and learn from each other. This was held at the Peres Center for Peace and Innovation in Tel Aviv.

== Aftermath ==
Consistent with the theme, The Genesis Prize Foundation provided grants to NGOs dedicated to alleviating the suffering in Ukraine.
