= 2024 Genesis Prize =

The 2024 Genesis Prize was awarded to five Israeli organizations supporting hostages and their families. These five organizations were The Hostages and Missing Families Forum, the Jewish Agency Fund for Victims of Terror, Lev Echad, Natal – The Israel Trauma and Resiliency Center, and OneFamily - Overcoming Terror Together.

== Ceremony ==
In light of the events of the October 7 attacks and the war that followed, there was no ceremony to honor the recipients.

== Aftermath ==
The prize money was granted to organizations that support treatment, trauma counseling, and social rehabilitation for released and rescued hostages and their families.
