= Ian Read =

Scottish-born American businessman

- Born: 1953 (age 72–73); Forfar, Scotland
- Education: Imperial College London
- Occupations: Executive Chairman, Pfizer
- Board member of: Pfizer; Kimberly-Clark

Ian C. Read (born 1953) is a Scottish business executive and a chartered accountant, who is executive chairman of the pharmaceutical company Pfizer. He was succeeded as CEO by Albert Bourla on 1 January 2019, becoming executive chairman.

== Early life ==
Read was born in Forfar, Scotland, to a Scottish mother, but his parents returned to Rhodesia (now Zimbabwe) when he was six-weeks-old, and he grew up there.

Read received a bachelor's degree in chemical engineering from the University of London in 1974. He qualified as a chartered accountant in 1978.

== Career ==
Read has spent his entire career with Pfizer, starting in 1978 as an operational auditor. He worked in Latin America through 1995, holding positions ranging from CFO of Pfizer Mexico (Pfizer's largest subsidiary in Latin America) to country manager of Brazil. In 1996, he was appointed president of the Pfizer International Pharmaceuticals Group, Latin America/Canada. He assumed the position of executive vice president—Europe/Canada in May 2000, added the responsibilities for Africa/Middle East region as of January 2004 and responsibilities for Latin America in March 2006. He was named vice president of Pfizer in 2001 and promoted to president of worldwide pharmaceutical operations in 2006. He is a member of the Pfizer Leadership Team.

On 5 December 2010, when Read "took over from Jeffrey Kindler as Pfizer’s CEO, the drug firm–the world’s largest–was facing the impending patent expiration of Lipitor, the bestselling drug ever made, and the utter failure of one of the most lavishly funded research laboratories on the planet to develop much of anything." Read is also a director of Kimberly-Clark. Read is now an American citizen.

By October 2015 during the Drug Pricing Firestorm, Forbes journalist Matthew Herper, wrote how "Read, with his calculating mind, must get through the public’s rage over six-figure price tags for breakthrough drugs and yet keep Pfizer’s pricing power more or less intact. Doing so is absolutely critical: 34% of Pfizer’s revenue growth over the past three years has come from increasing prices on existing drugs, according to SSR, a Stamford, Conn.-based consulting firm. New medicines, especially for cancer, are selling for $100,000-plus–prices that were unimaginable five years ago." In January 2019, Albert Bourla succeeded Read as CEO at Pfizer. In September 2019, Pfizer announced Read would retire as executive chairman at the end of 2019, ending a four-decade career there.

== Personal life ==
Read has a holiday home near Bonita Springs, Florida.
