= Genesis Prize =

Award honoring Jews established in 2012

The Genesis Prize
- Rewards: $1 million; directed to philanthropy
- First award: 2014
- Most recent recipient: Gal Gadot
- Website: genesisprize.org

The Genesis Prize (Hebrew: פרס בראשית) is a $1 million annual prize awarded to people who have achieved significant professional success, in recognition of their accomplishments, contributions to humanity, and commitment to Jewish values. Genesis Lifetime Achievement Awards have also been awarded.

== History ==
The prize was founded in 2012 with a $100 million endowment from five Russian businessmen: Mikhail Fridman, Pyotr Aven, German Khan, Stan Polovets, and Alexander Knaster. The prize was established under the administration of the Genesis Prize Foundation, in partnership with the Israeli Prime Minister's Office and the Jewish Agency for Israel. It is commonly referred to as the "Jewish Nobel Prize".

The prize has been handed out every year since 2014. Additionally there has been 2 Lifetime Achievement Awards as well as a 10th Anniversary prize.

As of November 2025, all laureates have opted to give the $1 million prize money to philanthropic causes of their choice.

== Laureate selection ==
Members of the committee that selects Genesis Prize laureates are chosen based on their leadership and support for Jewish causes. Current and former committee members include Elie Wiesel, Meir Shamgar, Lawrence Summers, Yuli Edelstein, Jonathan Sacks, Isaac Herzog, and Natan Sharansky.

In 2020, the Foundation opened the selection process to online voting and invited the public to nominate and vote for the 2021 Genesis Prize Laureate. Close to two hundred thousand Jews on six continents participated in the voting. The final selection of the Laureate remains with the two committees.

== Laureates ==
=== Genesis Prize laureates ===
Year	Laureate	names	Main occupations	Country	Rationale	Philanthropic theme
2014		Michael R. Bloomberg	mayor of New York City, co-founder and CEO of Bloomberg L.P.	United States	For his "track record of outstanding public service and his role as one of the world's greatest philanthropists". Bloomberg donated his award to a subsequent competition, the Genesis Generation Challenge, to fund young adults' ideas to solve major problems. Nine projects were selected from submissions: Building Up, eNable 3D Printed Prosthetics, Friends of the Arava Institute, LAVAN, Prize4Life, Sanergy, Sesame, Spark, and the Vera Fellowship Program.	Social entrepreneurship based on Jewish values
2015		Michael Douglas	actor, film producer	United States	For "his body of work as an actor and producer; his passionate advocacy as a UN Messenger of Peace, focusing on human rights, gun violence prevention, and nuclear anti-proliferation work; and for his passion for his Jewish heritage". Douglas' award led to a program called "Avenues to Jewish Engagement for Intermarried Couples and their families," which dispersed $3.3 million in grants to organizations promoting the engagement of intermarried families in Jewish life. A second set of grants was disbursed in 2016.	Welcoming intermarried families in Jewish life
2016		Itzhak Perlman	violinist	Israel / United States	For his "story of overcoming extraordinary personal challenges to excel as one of the world's great musicians and humanitarians". The prize was doubled by a donation from Roman Abramovich to $2 million. Perlman re-gifted the funds to fund grant programs to support initiatives for people with disabilities in North America and in Israel, and for arts and culture.	Improving the lives of individuals with special needs
2017		Anish Kapoor	sculptor specializing in installation art and conceptual art	United Kingdom / India	As "one of the most influential and innovative artists of his generation". Kapoor said he would direct his $1 million award to helping alleviate the ongoing Syrian refugee crisis and focus on expanding the Jewish community's engagement in a global effort to support refugees.	Helping to alleviate the global refugee crisis
2018		Natalie Portman	actress	Israel / United States	"In recognition of her commitment to social causes and deep connection to her Jewish and Israeli roots." The prize was doubled by a donation from Morris Kahn to $2 million. Portman said she would donate her award funds to philanthropic programs focused on women's equality, education, economic advancement, health, and political participation.	Advancing women's equality
2018 Lifetime achievement honoree		Ruth Bader Ginsburg	associate justice of the Supreme Court of the United States	United States	For her "contribution to the development of a fair and just society that provides equal opportunity for all." The Genesis Prize Foundation announced that U.S. Supreme Court Justice Ruth Bader Ginsburg was selected as the inaugural recipient of the Genesis Lifetime Achievement Award. The Award coincides with the fifth anniversary of the Genesis Prize.	Advancing women's equality
2019		Robert Kraft	CEO of the Kraft Group, owner of the New England Patriots	United States	"In recognition of his philanthropy and commitment to combatting anti-Semitism." Kraft's prize money was donated to initiatives that combat anti-Semitism and prejudice.	Combating antisemitism and efforts to delegitimize the State of Israel
2020		Natan Sharansky	Soviet dissident, Chairman of the Executive for the Jewish Agency	Israel	In recognition, as a "legendary advocate for freedom, democracy and human rights." His prize money was used to fund innovative solutions and interventions to the COVID-19 pandemic.	Assisting those affected by the COVID pandemic
2021		Steven Spielberg	filmmaker, the most commercially successful director in history	United States	For "his contribution to cinema, his philanthropic works and his efforts to preserve the memory of the Holocaust." His prize money was donated to U.S. non-profits fighting for racial and economic justice.	Fighting for racial and economic justice
2021 Lifetime achievement honoree	Sirjonathansacks (headshot)	Rabbi Lord Johnathan Sacks	Chief Rabbi of the United Hebrew Congregations of the Commonwealth	United Kingdom	For "his extraordinary role in inspiring the next generation of Jews, and his illustrious life-long work as a teacher of Jewish values and an advocate of inter-religious and inter-cultural dialogue."	
2022	Albert Bourla	Albert Bourla	veterinarian, CEO of Pfizer	Greece / United States	For "leadership, determination, and willingness to assume great risk, which resulted in the Pfizer–BioNTech COVID-19 vaccine being ready in record time: months instead of years."	Preserving the memory of Jewish communities destroyed during the Nazi occupation of Greece
2023	Jewish activists and NGOs supporting Ukraine				For "working to uphold Ukraine's independence and alleviate the suffering of the people of Ukraine."	Assisting Jewish activists and NGOs working to alleviate the suffering of the people of Ukraine
2024	Israeli organizations supporting hostages and their families				For "providing treatment, counseling and support to the released and rescued hostages and their families."	Supporting humanitarian assistance, treatment, rehabilitation and counseling for hostages rescued or released from Hamas captivity and their families
10th Anniversary	Barbra_Streisand_with_Francis_Collins_and_Anthony_Fauci_(27806589237)	Barbra Streisand	singer, actress, director	United States	For "six decades of Streisand's contributions to cinema and music and her commitment to improving the world."	Supporting equity in women's health, fighting climate change, combatting disinformation, and aiding the Ukrainian people
2025	Javier_Milei_2024_	Javier Milei	President of Argentina	Argentina	For “his unequivocal support of Israel during one of the most difficult times since the founding of the Jewish State”, in reference to the Gaza war.	Fostering diplomatic, economic, and cultural cooperation between Israel and Latin American nations, by envisioning the Isaac Accords. The funds were used to help establish the American Friends of Isaac Accords, a nonprofit organization.
2026 (Note: The award money was doubled following a matching-gifts program launched by The Genesis Prize Foundation and the Jewish Funders Network.)	Gal Gadot	Gal Gadot	actress, producer	Israel / United States	For “her advocacy for hostages, support of Israel and empathy for all innocent people affected by the war."	To help Israelis heal, rebuild, and recover.

== Controversies ==
On November 7, 2017, the Foundation announced Portman as the 2018 laureate, and her decision to donate the $1 million in prize money to philanthropic programs focused on women's equality, education, economic advancement, health, and political participation. A month later, Israeli philanthropist Morris Kahn pledged another $1 million in Portman's honor, bringing the total gift to $2 million. The prize ceremony was canceled in April 2018 after Portman's representatives told the press that "recent events in Israel have been extremely distressing to her and she does not feel comfortable participating in any public events in Israel." Portman later claimed that she was not boycotting Israel, but that she didn't want to "appear as endorsing" Netanyahu, who was set to give a speech at the ceremony.

In January 2020, partly as a result of the Portman controversy, the Genesis Prize Foundation and the PMO terminated their agreement, ending the Prime Minister's participation in the ceremony.

In 2019, Prize Laureate Robert Kraft was named as one of more than 200 people involved in a Florida solicitation sting operation. Genesis Prize Foundation Chairman Stan Polovets said that the Prize to Kraft would not be rescinded, noting that in democratic countries "everyone is entitled to the presumption of innocence." All charges against Kraft were later dropped.

Jonathan Tobin questioned whether giving an award to a famous recipient was a distraction from reinvigorating Jewish institutions.

== Laureates per country ==
Below is a chart of all laureates per country (updated to include 2026 laureates). Some laureates are counted more than once if have multiple citizenship.

Country	Number of laureates
United States	10
Israel	4
United Kingdom	2
Argentina	1
India	1
Greece	1
