= Stan Polovets =

Russian-American businessman and philanthropist (born 1963)

- Станислав Половец
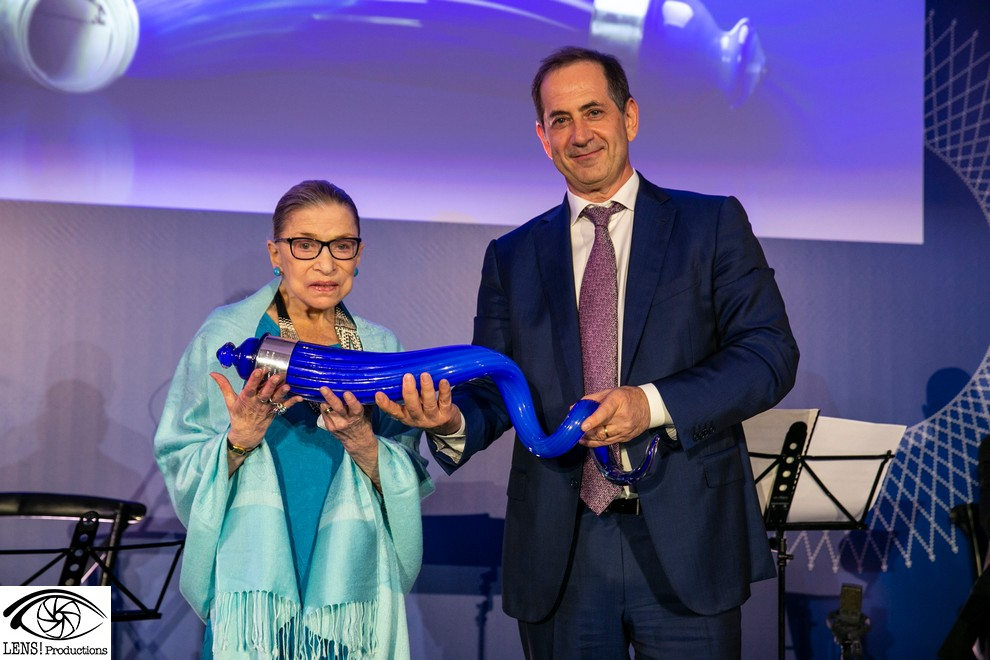
- Polovets awards Justice Ruth Bader Ginsburg the Genesis Lifetime Achievement Award in 2018
- Born: June 8, 1963 (age 62); Moscow, Soviet Union (present-day Russia)
- Occupations: Businessman and philanthropist
- Organizations: L1 Energy/Alfa Group, Genesis Prize Foundation, Access Industries, Edelman, Stanford University, New York University

Stan Polovets (born June 8, 1963) is an American businessman and philanthropist. He is known for his work in the international energy sector and for his innovative philanthropic initiatives.

Polovets played a notable role in the creation of TNK-BP, one of the largest joint ventures in the global energy industry, which operated in 2003-2013 and controlled more than 18% of Russia’s total oil production. He held a number of executive and board posts and was instrumental in its subsequent divestment in a record $55 billion transaction.

In May 2020, Polovets was elected chairman of the board of directors of Anchiano Therapeutics Ltd., a NASDAQ-listed biopharmaceutical company. In March 2021, he stepped down as chairman after the company posted a 630% return in 12 months, and merged with Israel-based Chemomab Therapeutics.

Polovets is a member of the Council on Foreign Relations, the President’s Global Council at New York University (NYU), and the board of overseers at the NYU Tandon School of Engineering. From 2014 to 2019, he served on the board of overseers of Stanford University's Hoover Institution.

He is the co-founder and chairman/CEO of the Genesis Prize Foundation, a global philanthropic initiative focused on enhancing Jewish identity.

== Personal life and education ==
Stan Polovets was born in 1963 in Moscow, USSR. His family immigrated to the United States in 1976, and he became a naturalized U.S. citizen in 1983. He received a Bachelor of Science degree from California State University, Northridge (1985), and attended Stanford University, graduating with an MBA and MA in 1989.

== Business affiliations ==
=== Early career ===
Prior to graduate school, he worked as an analyst for Exxon, a management consultant for KPMG, and defense analyst at The RAND Corporation, a public policy think tank. After receiving his MBA from Stanford Business School, Polovets moved to New York to work at the global headquarters of Ernst & Young, where he was responsible for establishing the company's consulting business in the former Soviet Union and Eastern Europe.

In 1992, he established RPI Group, a boutique communications and consulting firm focused on the Russian energy sector. Until the company’s sale in 1998, he served as its CEO and was an advisor to the minister of oil and gas of Turkmenistan and to the general director of Mazeikiu Nafta, Lithuania’s national oil company. RPI’s two flagship publications, Russian Petroleum Investor and Caspian Investor, continue to be published by Thomson Reuters.

=== TNK-BP and AAR ===
In 2001, Polovets joined Tyumen Oil Company (TNK), an emerging Russian oil producer, as vice president of mergers and acquisitions. In 2002–2003 Polovets represented TNK in a $15 billion merger with BP that led to the establishment of TNK-BP. The merger became the largest corporate transaction in Russia and the single largest foreign investment in a Russian company at that time. The company established as a result of this merger eventually became one of the world’s ten largest non-state oil producers, comparable in size with such companies as Chevron, ConocoPhillips and Statoil. It operated in Russia, Ukraine, Brazil, Venezuela and Vietnam.

Between 2003 and 2006 Polovets held a number of senior executive posts in the TNK-BP Group, including senior vice president and chief of staff to TNK-BP’s president Bob Dudley, later the CEO of BP.

In 2006 Polovets briefly left the TNK-BP Group to become first vice president of Uralsib, a major Russian financial institution. In 2007 Polovets became the CEO of the Alfa-Access-Renova (AAR) Consortium, which held a 50% stake in TNK-BP. In that capacity, he represented AAR on the board and board committees of TNK-BP, as well as its key subsidiaries and affiliates, including Slavneft (a joint venture with Gazpromneft) and TNK Trading International (TTI, an international trading subsidiary).

In 2011, Polovets was involved in AAR’s legal battle against BP, which was also a 50% shareholder in TNK-BP. AAR filed a lawsuit seeking to block BP's strategic alliance with Rosneft in a bid to access Russia's Arctic reserves and bypass TNK-BP.

AAR won an injunction from the High Court of London that blocked BP from entering a strategic alliance and executing a share swap with Rosneft. The Stockholm Arbitration Tribunal made a similar ruling, upholding AAR’s position and preventing BP’s attempted alliance with Russia’s state-owned company. AAR’s successful bid to block the BP-Rosneft alliance paved the way for AAR’s cash-out from TNK-BP two years later.

In 2013, in his capacity as CEO of AAR, Polovets was involved in executing the sale of AAR’s 50% stake in TNK-BP to Rosneft for $28 billion. BP also sold its TNK-BP stake to Rosneft in a parallel transaction, making the $55 billion sale of TNK-BP the largest M&A deal in Russia’s history, and the largest M&A transaction in the global energy sector in a decade. Between 2003 and 2013, AAR shareholders received more than $20 billion in dividends from TNK-BP and saw the value of its stake grow from $7.5 billion to $28 billion, making it one of the most successful investments in the history of the oil and gas industry.

From May 2013 until December 2019, Polovets served as the lead non-executive director for L1 Energy, the international investment vehicle of Alfa Group.

From May 2014 through October 2016, Polovets served as the chairman for Russia and Eastern Europe at Edelman, the largest global PR firm.

From September 2014 until March 2020, Polovets served as senior advisor to Access Industries, a privately held industrial group with long-term holdings in natural resources, chemicals, media, telecoms and real estate, owned by American entrepreneur and philanthropist Len Blavatnik. Polovets represented Access as the lead non-executive director on the board of directors of Clal Industries, a major Israeli holding company with a diversified portfolio of investments in industrial manufacturing, hi-tech and consumer sectors.

== Philanthropy ==
Polovets is a co-founder and chairman and CEO of the Genesis Prize Foundation. The Foundation awards an annual $1 million prize to exceptional individuals whose achievements will inspire and instill a sense of pride in the next generation of Jews. The prize has a permanent endowment of $100 million and is a partnership between the Genesis Prize Foundation and the Jewish Agency for Israel (Sokhnut). Each of the laureates has chosen to forgo the award funds and directed their $1 million prizes – often matched by additional donors – to various charitable causes.

Polovets is also a co-founder and CEO emeritus of Genesis Philanthropy Group (GPG), one of the largest private foundations in the field of Jewish philanthropy, with offices in Moscow, New York City, London and Tel Aviv. Polovets served as the founding CEO of GPG from its inception in 2007 until July 2014. He represented GPG on the boards of several non-profits funded by GPG, including serving as vice chairman of Hillel Russia.

In 2003, Polovets established, funded, and managed the Vnimanie Foundation, a non-profit organization dedicated to supporting Russian children with learning disabilities and behavioral disorders. The board of Vnimanie included many prominent individuals, including the former Soviet leader Mikhail Gorbachev. The executive director of Vnimanie Foundation was Sergei Filatov, who previously served as President Boris Yeltsin’s chief of staff.
