= 10th Anniversary Genesis Prize =

The 10th Anniversary Genesis Prize was awarded to Barbra Streisand for "six decades of Streisand's contributions to cinema and music and her commitment to improving the world.”

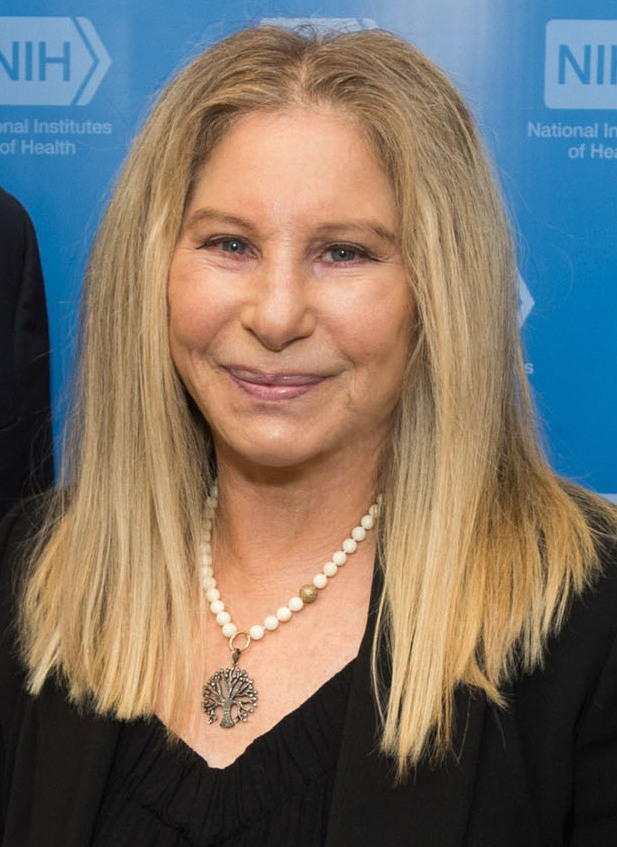
10th Anniversary Genesis Prize laureate Barbra Streisand

== Background ==
In May 2023, it was announced that Streisand would be the 10th Anniversary Laureate. She is the fourth woman honored by The Genesis Prize Foundation, with others being actress and producer Natalie Portman, actress and producer Gal Gadot, and former Supreme Court Justice Ruth Bader Ginsburg.

== Ceremony ==
Streisand was honored at a ceremony in Los Angeles in June 2024.

== Aftermath ==
Streisand directed the prize to nonprofit organizations working in four areas: protecting the environment, promoting women’s health, combating disinformation in the media and aiding the people of Ukraine. The organizations selected included the Hebrew Immigrant Aid Society, United 24, Women’s Heart Alliance, League of Conservation Voters Education Fund, National Resources Defense Council, and the UCLA Center for Truth in the Public Sphere.
