= 2015 Genesis Prize =

The 2015 Genesis Prize was awarded to actor and producer Michael Douglas. It was the second awarding of the Genesis Prize after it was first awarded to Michael Bloomberg in 2014.

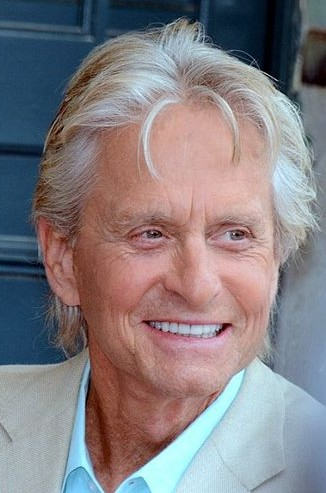
Michael Douglas second winner of the Genesis Prize

== Background ==
Douglas was chosen "both for his professional achievements and for his passion for his Jewish heritage and the Jewish state."

On hearing the news Douglas said,“I share this award with my family, who encouraged me in my exploration of the Jewish faith. I hope these teachings and values will be part of the legacy in the world that I leave for my children and those who follow.”

== Ceremony ==
The prize giving ceremony took place at the Jerusalem Theater in June 2015. The ceremony was hosted by Jay Leno and Bar Refaeli. The prize was presented by Prime Minister Benjamin Netanyahu and Natan Sharansky.

== Aftermath ==
The $1 million prize money was doubled after Roman Abramovich matched it. With a non-Jewish mother, Douglas was inspired to donate the money to organizations supporting intermarried families seeking a connection to the Jewish community. One grant was given to Hillel for programs it conducts to engage children from intermarried families and then a competition administered by The Genesis Prize Foundation and Jewish Funders Network resulted in funding toto 28 organizations from 7 countries.
