= 2021 Genesis Prize =

The 2021 Genesis Prize was awarded to Steven Spielberg.

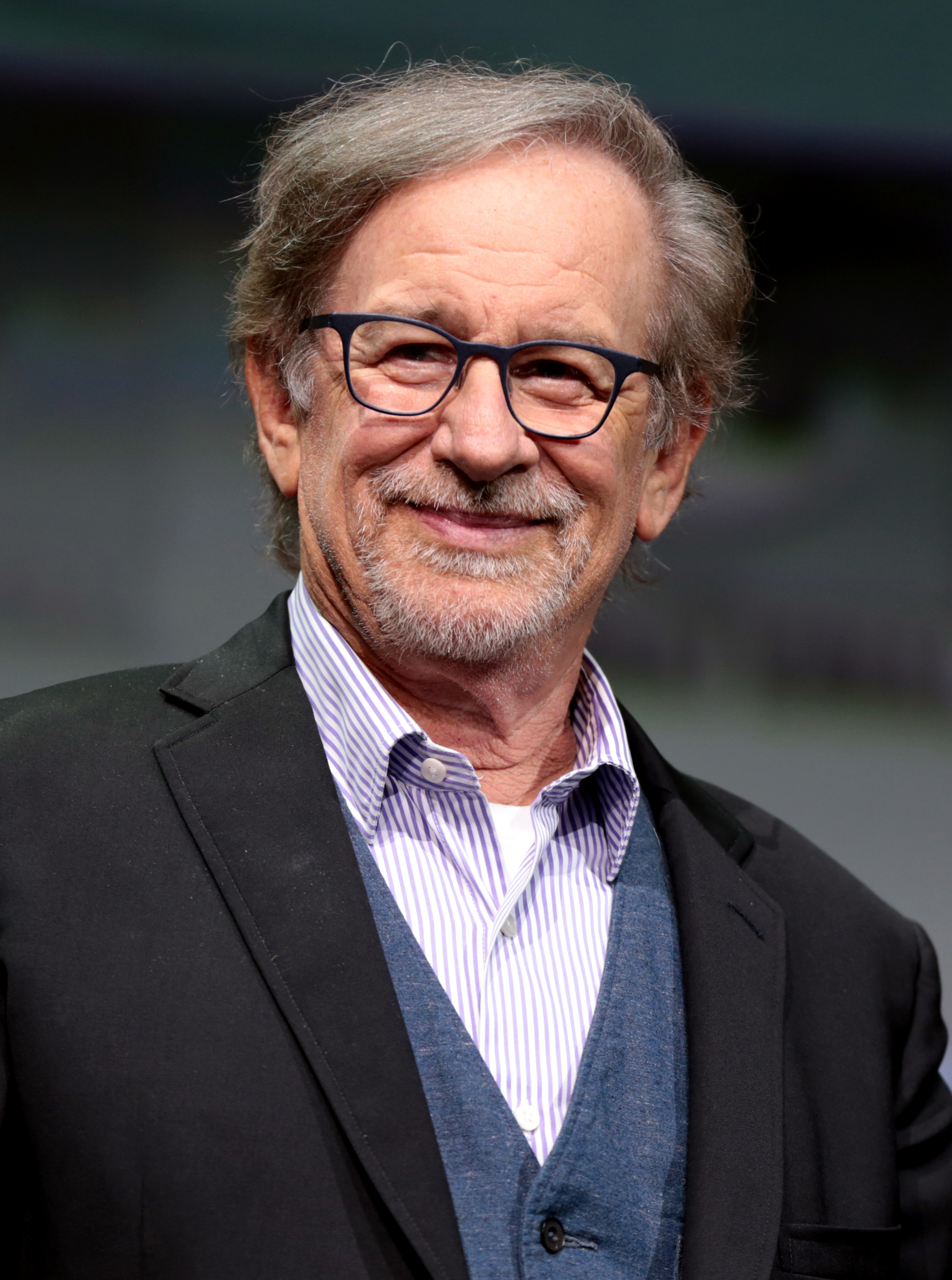
Steven Spielberg, winner of the 2021 Genesis Prize

== Background ==
One of the most influential directors and producers in history, Spielberg was recognized for his contribution to cinema, his philanthropic work and his efforts to preserve the memory of the Holocaust. He received the most votes in an online campaign conducted by The Genesis Prize Foundation.

== Ceremony ==
In the midst of the coronavirus pandemic, no ceremony took place.

== Aftermath ==
Spielberg donated his $1 million Genesis Prize to 10 nonprofits operating in the field of racial and economic justice. Spielberg and his wife, actress Kate Capshaw, matched it with $1 million of their own money.

The organizations selected for grants were: Avodah; Black Voters Matter; Collaborative for Jewish Organizing; Dayenu – A Jewish Call to Climate Action; Jews of Color Initiative; Justice for Migrant Women; National Domestic Workers Alliance; Native American Rights Fund; One Fair Wage and Religious Action Center of Reform Judaism.

== 2021 Genesis Lifetime Achievement Award honoree - Lord Rabbi Jonathan Sacks ==
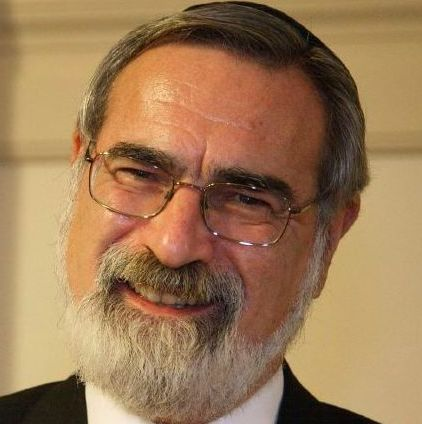
Rabbi Lord Jonathan Sacks, 2021 Genesis Lifetime Achievement Awardee

Rabbi Sacks died in November 2020. Twelve months later, he was posthumously honored with the second Genesis Lifetime Achievement Award at a ceremony in London.

Before his death, Sacks was one of the finalists for the Genesis Prize. Given that the prize is only awarded to living people, on the anniversary of his passing, The Genesis Prize Foundation decided to honor his legacy with the lifetime achievement award. The award was presented by the President of Israel Isaac Herzog to Lady Elaine Sacks, the widow of Lord Sacks.
