= 2014 Genesis Prize =

The 2014 Genesis Prize was the first awarding of the prize that Time Magazine dubbed “The Jewish Nobel.” The inaugural Genesis Prize laureate was Michael Bloomberg, mayor of New York City, founder and CEO of Bloomberg L.P. and founder/chairman of Bloomberg Philanthropies.

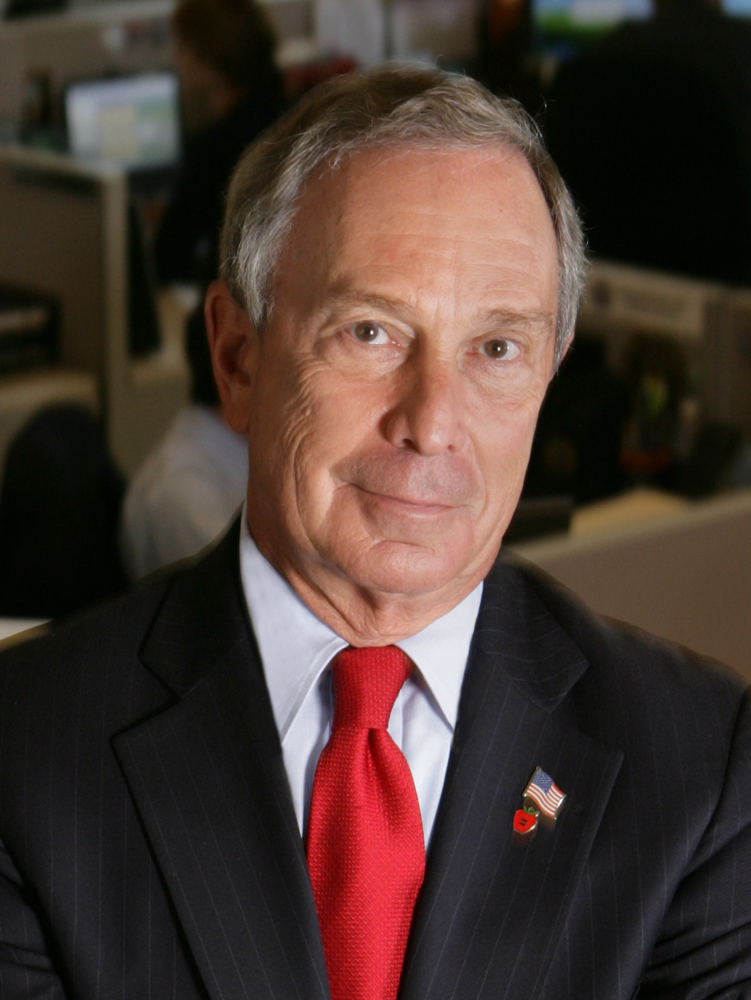
Michael Bloomberg first winner of the Genesis Prize

== Background ==
The prize was founded in 2012 and in October 2013, Bloomberg was announced as its first recipient. He was chosen for his "track record of outstanding public service and his role as one of the world's greatest philanthropists".

== Ceremony ==
The award ceremony took place at the Jerusalem Theater in May 2014. The ceremony was hosted by comedian Jay Leno, with performances from pianist Evgeny Kissin and Israeli singer Rita. The prize was presented by Prime Minister Benjamin Netanyahu and co-founder/chairman of The Genesis Prize Foundation Stan Polovets.

Starting a tradition that every subsequent laureate would follow, Bloomberg declined the financial part of the award and used the $1 million prize money to launch a global competition, the Genesis Generation Challenge. The goal of the competition was to identify young adults' “big ideas to better the world.”

== Aftermath ==
In April 2015, nine projects were selected for funding: Building Up, eNable 3D Printed Prosthetics, Friends of the Arava Institute, LAVAN, Prize4Life, Sanergy, Sesame, Spark, and the Vera Fellowship Program.
