= Itzhak Perlman =

Israeli-American violinist (born 1945)

- יצחק פרלמן
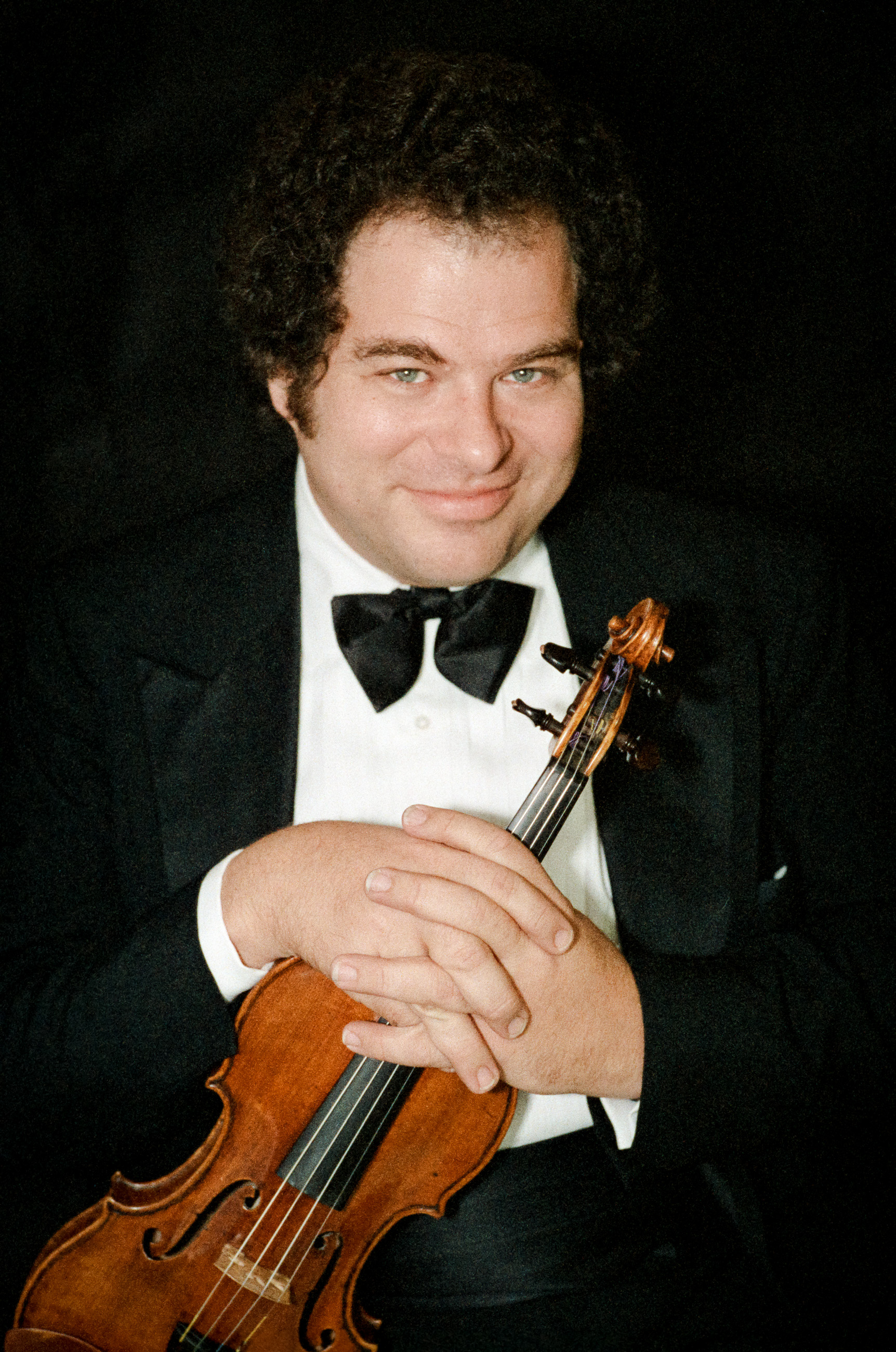
- Perlman in 1984
- Born: August 31, 1945 (age 81); Tel Aviv, Mandatory Palestine
- Occupations: Classical violinist, conductor
- Years active: 1958–present
- Spouse: Toby Friedlander (m. 1967)
- Children: 5
- Musical career
- Genre: Classical
- Instrument: Violin
- Labels: Angel; CBS; Sony; London; EMI Classics; Deutsche Grammophon; Warner; BMG
- Website: itzhakperlman.com

Itzhak Perlman (Hebrew: יצחק פרלמן; born August 31, 1945) is an Israeli-American violinist.

He has performed worldwide and throughout the United States, in venues that have included a state dinner for Elizabeth II at the White House in 2007, and at the 2009 inauguration of Barack Obama.

He has conducted the Detroit Symphony Orchestra, the Philadelphia Orchestra, and the Westchester Philharmonic.

In 2015 he was awarded the Presidential Medal of Freedom. He has won 16 Grammy Awards, including a Grammy Lifetime Achievement Award, and four Emmy Awards.

== Early life ==
Perlman was born on August 31, 1945, in Tel Aviv. His parents, Chaim and Shoshana Perlman, were Jewish natives of Poland and had independently emigrated to Mandatory Palestine in the mid-1930s before they met and later married. Perlman contracted polio at age four and has walked using leg braces and crutches since then and plays the violin while seated. As of 2018, he uses crutches or an electric scooter for mobility.

When Perlman was three years old, he listened to a violin recital on the radio featuring the violinist Jascha Heifetz. This experience inspired him to become a violinist. His mother soon bought him a toy violin, and he quickly taught himself to play melodies. His parents tried to enroll him at the Shulamit Conservatory, but he was denied admission for being too small to hold a violin.

Despite this setback, he began learning the violin a year later, his first teacher being a café violinist. At five years old, Perlman was admitted to the Academy of Music in Tel Aviv (later the Buchmann-Mehta School of Music), where he took violin lessons for eight years with Rivka Goldgart, a teacher of Russian origin. He gave his first recital at the age of ten. At thirteen, he moved to the United States to continue his violin studies at the Juilliard School in New York City and the Meadowmount School of Music in Essex County, New York, studying under Ivan Galamian and his assistant, Dorothy DeLay.

== Career ==
=== Performing ===
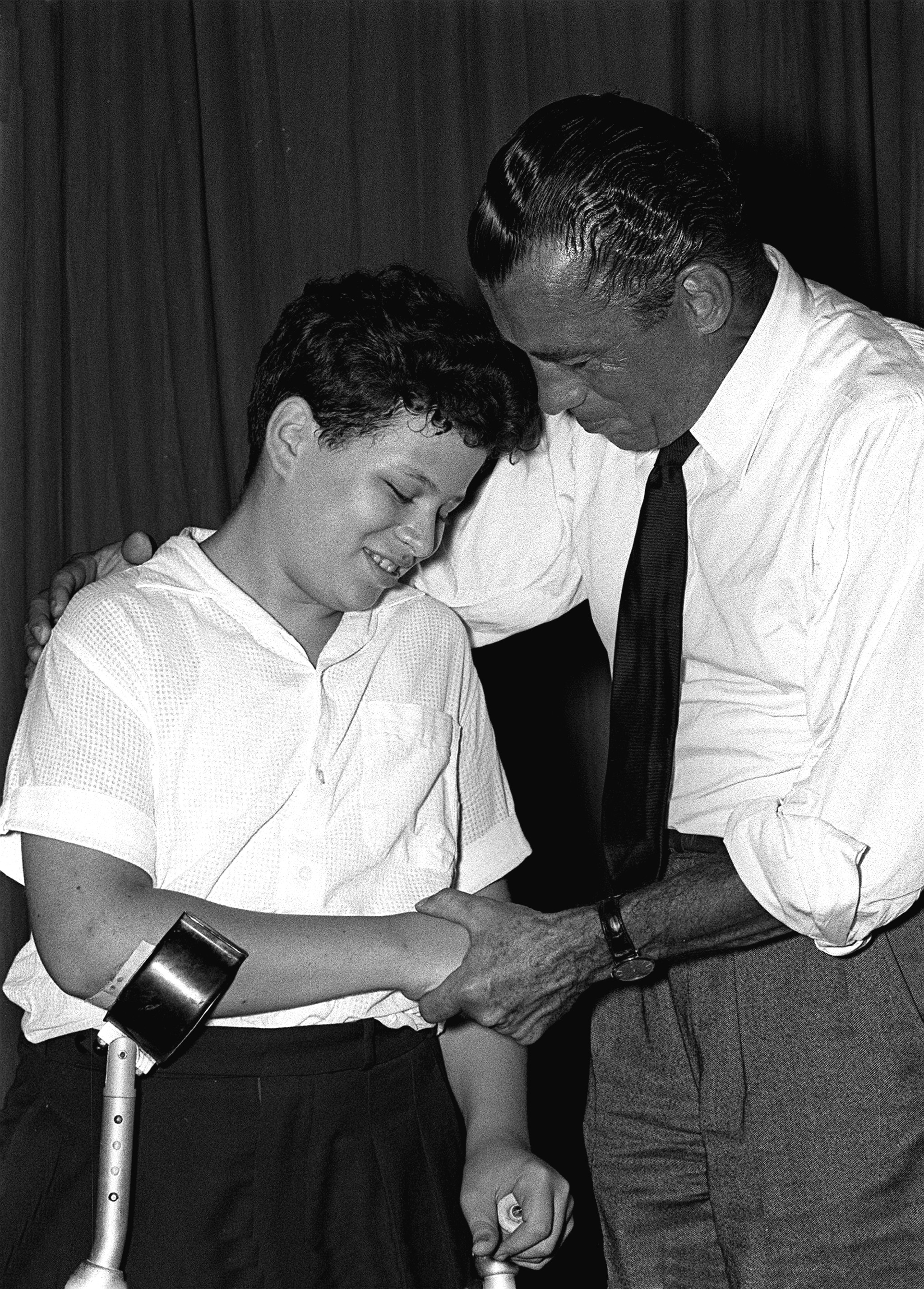
Ed Sullivan congratulates 13-year-old Perlman after a concert (1958)

Perlman gained national attention when he appeared on The Ed Sullivan Show twice in 1958 at 13 years old, and again in 1964, on the same show with the Rolling Stones. His performances on the show included pieces such as Rimsky-Korsakov's Flight of the Bumblebee, Wieniawski's Polonaise Brillante, and Mendelssohn's Violin Concerto. In 1963 and 1964, Perlman made appearances with the National Orchestra Association in Wieniawski's Violin Concerto No. 1, the New York Youth Orchestra in Beethoven's Violin Concerto, and with the Detroit Symphony Orchestra.

With the Zionist Organization of America's sponsorship, Perlman began touring cities in the U.S. and Canada as a soloist, and quickly established himself as a leading virtuoso. He made his Carnegie Hall debut performing Wieniawski's Concerto in 1963 and won the Leventritt Competition in 1964. From 1964 to 1966, Perlman embarked on his first notable concert tour in the United States, performed in 30 cities, including Buffalo, Cleveland, Detroit, Pittsburgh, Denver, Honolulu, Indianapolis, Los Angeles, Minneapolis, New Haven, Seattle, and St. Louis. Perlman returned twice to the Ed Sullivan Show in 1964. During the later part of 1964, Perlman gave several concerts in Israel, a tour that concluded with the Tchaikovsky Violin Concerto at the Mann Auditorium in Tel Aviv.

Perlman first appeared with the New York Philharmonic at the Philharmonic Hall as a soloist on May 9, 1965, playing Bruch's Violin Concerto No. 1 under William Steinberg. He debuted with the Los Angeles Philharmonic with the same concerto on February 17, 1966. In 1965, Perlman debuted with the Cleveland Orchestra at Severance Hall in Tchaikovsky's Violin Concert under Louis Lane. He debuted with the Chicago Symphony Orchestra at the Ravinia Festival on August 4, 1966, in Tchaikovsky's Concerto with conductor Thomas Schippers. Perlman made his debut with the Boston Symphony Orchestra on December 16, 1966, playing Prokofiev's Violin Concerto No. 2 under Erich Leinsdorf.

Starting in the late 1960s, Perlman began to tour Europe. He debuted with the London Symphony Orchestra in 1968, performing Tchaikovky's Concerto under the direction of André Previn. On May 25, 1972, Perlman debuted with the Berlin Philharmonic with the same concerto. This was shortly followed by his debut at the Salzburg Festival with a solo performance of Schubert's Rondo and Fantasy and the Violin Sonata No. 3 by Brahms with Joseph Kalichstein on August 19, 1972. The next day, Perlman performed Mozart's Violin Concerto No. 4 with the Vienna Philharmonic under Claudio Abbado. Perlman has made appearances on television shows such as The Tonight Show and Sesame Street.

Although Perlman has never been billed or marketed as a singer, he sang the role of "Un carceriere" ("a jailer") on a 1981 EMI recording of Puccini's "Tosca" that featured Renata Scotto, Plácido Domingo, and Renato Bruson, with James Levine conducting. He had earlier sung the role in an excerpt from the opera on a 1980 Pension Fund Benefit Concert telecast as part of the Live from Lincoln Center series with Luciano Pavarotti as Cavaradossi and Zubin Mehta conducting the New York Philharmonic.

On July 5, 1986, Perlman performed at the New York Philharmonic's tribute to the 100th anniversary of the Statue of Liberty, which was televised live on ABC. The orchestra, conducted by Mehta, performed in Central Park.

While primarily a solo artist, Perlman has performed with a number of other musicians, including Yo-Yo Ma, Pinchas Zukerman, Jessye Norman, Vladimir Ashkenazy, Isaac Stern, and Yuri Temirkanov at the 150th anniversary celebration of Tchaikovsky in Leningrad in December 1990. As well as playing and recording the classical music for which he is best known, Perlman has also played jazz, including an album made with jazz pianist Oscar Peterson; klezmer; and bluegrass music. He has been a soloist in a number of film scores, such as the theme of the 1993 film Schindler's List by John Williams, which won an Academy Award for Best Original Score. More recently, he was the violin soloist in the 2005 film Memoirs of a Geisha along with cellist Yo-Yo Ma. Perlman played selections from the musical scores of the movies nominated for "Best Original Score" at the 73rd Academy Awards with Ma and at the 78th Academy Awards. Perlman is represented by Charlotte Lee at Primo Artists.

=== Selected performances ===
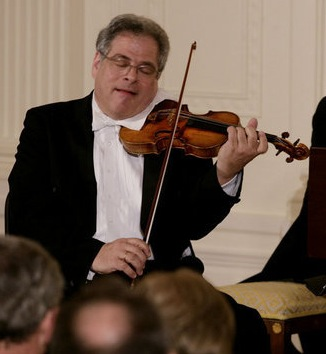
Perlman at the White House in 2007

Perlman played at the state dinner attended by Queen Elizabeth II on May 7, 2007, in the East Room at the White House.

He performed John Williams's "Air and Simple Gifts" at the 2009 inauguration ceremony for Barack Obama along with cellist Yo-Yo Ma, pianist Gabriela Montero, and clarinetist Anthony McGill. The quartet played live, but the music played simultaneously over speakers and on television was a recording made two days earlier due to concerns that the cold weather could damage the instruments. Perlman was quoted as saying: "It would have been a disaster if we had done it any other way."

On November 2, 2018, Perlman reprised the 60th anniversary of his first appearance on The Ed Sullivan Show as a guest on The Late Show with Stephen Colbert.

== Teaching ==
In 1975, Perlman accepted a faculty post at the Conservatory of Music at Brooklyn College. In 2003, he was named the Dorothy Richard Starling Foundation Chair in Violin Studies at the Juilliard School, succeeding his teacher, Dorothy DeLay. He also teaches students one-on-one at the Perlman Music Program on Long Island, New York, rarely holding master classes.

=== The Perlman Music Program ===
The Perlman Music Program, founded in 1994 by Perlman's wife, Toby Perlman, and Suki Sandler, started as a summer camp for exceptional string musicians between the ages of 12 and 18. Over time, it expanded to a yearlong program. Students have the chance to have Perlman coach them before they play at venues such as the Sutton Place Synagogue and public schools. By introducing students to each other and requiring them to practice together, the program strives to have musicians who would otherwise practice alone develop a network of friends and colleagues. Rather than remain isolated, participants in the program find an area where they belong.

=== Conducting ===
At the beginning of the new millennium, Perlman began to conduct. He took the post of principal guest conductor at the Detroit Symphony Orchestra. He served as music advisor to the Saint Louis Symphony Orchestra from 2002 to 2004. In November 2007, the Westchester Philharmonic announced his appointment as artistic director and principal conductor. His first concert in these roles was on October 11, 2008, in an all-Beethoven program featuring pianist Leon Fleisher performing the Emperor Concerto.

== Instruments ==
Perlman plays the Soil Stradivarius violin of 1714, formerly owned by Yehudi Menuhin and considered one of the finest violins made during Stradivari's "golden period". Perlman also plays the Guarneri del Gesù 1743 'Sauret'.

== Personal life ==
Perlman lives in New York City with his wife, Toby, also a classically trained violinist. They met as students and married in 1967. They have five children, including Navah Perlman, a concert pianist and chamber musician. Perlman is a distant cousin of the Canadian comic and television personality Howie Mandel. He has synesthesia and was interviewed about the condition by Maureen Seaberg for Tasting the Universe.

When asked about the Gaza war in 2024, Perlman said he was loyal to Israel.

== Discography ==
Perlman has recorded music in many genres. In 2025, Deutsche Grammophon (DG) issued its complete 25 recordings with Perlman on the occasion of his 80th birthday.

=== From 1960s ===
- Prokofieff: Concerto No. 2 in G Minor / Sibelius: Concerto in D Minor (RCA Victor, 1967)
- Franck: Sonata for Violin & Piano (Vladimir Ashkenazy) in A Major / Brahms: Trio for Violin, Horn (Barry Tuckwell) and Piano in E flat Major (London Records, 1969)
- Lalo: Symphonie Espagnole / Ravel: Tzigane (RCA Red Seal, 1969)

=== From 1970s ===
- Prokofiev: Sonatas for Violin and Piano, No. 1, Op. 80 / No. 2, Op. 94a (RCA Red Seal, 1969 & RCA Gold Seal, 1975)
- The 24 Caprices, Op. 1 by Paganini (Angel Records, 1972)
- Bach: Double Concerto in D Minor, Violin Concerto No. 2 in E, Violin Concerto in G Minor (Angel 1972)
- Wieniawski: The Two Violin Concertos (Angel, 1973)
- Bartok: Violin Concerto No. 2 (Angel, 1974)
- Perpetual Motion (Angel, 1974)
- Tchaikovsky: Violin Concerto / Dvořák: Romance (RCA Gold Seal, 1975)
- Ravel; Saint-Saëns; Chausson (Angel, 1975)
- Paganini; Giuliani: Duos for Violin & Guitar (John Williams) (CBS, 1976)
- Sibelius Violin Concerto / Prokofieff Violin Concerto No. 2 (RCA, 1976)
- Itzhak Perlman plays Stravinsky (1976)
- Itzhak Perlman plays Fritz Kreisler (1976)
- Itzhak Perlman plays Fritz Kreisler, Volume 2 (1977)
- Goldmark: Violin Concerto No. 1 / Sarasate: Zigeunerweisen (Angel, 1977)
- Bruch: Scottish Fantasy, Op. 46 / Violin Concerto No. 2 in D Minor, Op. 44 (Angel, 1977)
- Duets for Two Violins (Angel, 1977)
- Beethoven: Sonatas for Violin and Piano, Volume 4 (London Records, 1977)
- Brahms: Violin Concerto (Angel, 1977)
- Vieuxtemps: Violin Concertos No. 4 in D Minor / No.5 in A Minor (Angel, 1978)
- First Recording of the Tchaikovsky Violin Concerto (Quintessence Records, 1978)
- Tchaikovsky: Violin Concerto in D Major & Serenade Melancolique (Angel, 1979)
- Virtuoso Violinist (Angel, 1979)
- Berg: Violin Concerto (DG, 1979)
- Beethoven: Sonatas for Violin and Piano (London Records, 1979)
- Encores (Angel, 1979)
- Dohnanyi: Serenade / Beethoven: Serenade (Columbia Masterworks, 1979)

=== From 1980s ===
- The Spanish Album (Angel, 1980)
- Itzhak Perlman plays Fritz Kreisler, Volume 3 (1980)
- Berg: Violin Concerto / Stravinsky: Violin Concerto (DG, 1980)
- Itzhak Perlman & Pinchas Zukerman Play Music for Two Violins (1980)
- Sibelius: Violin Concerto / Sinding: Suite in A Minor (Angel, 1980)
- A Different Kind of Blues (EMI/Angel, 1980)
- It's a Breeze (EMI/Angel, 1981)
- Bartok Duos For Two Violins (Angel, 1981)
- Itzhak Perlman (Great Performers series, 1981)
- The Great Romantic Violin Concertos (Angel, 1981)
- Beethoven: Violin Concerto, Op. 61 (EMI, 1981)
- Korngold: Concerto in D / Conus: Concerto in E Minor (EMI, 1981)
- Lalo: Symphonie Espagnole / Berlioz: Reverie Et Caprice (DG, 1981)
- The Two Violin Concertos by Prokofiev (Angel, 1982)
- Elgar: Violin Concerto (DG, 1982)
- Beethoven: Violin Sonatas, Kreutzer - Spring (London Records, 1983)
- Mozart: Violin Concertos Nos. 3 & 5 (DG, 1983)
- Saint-Saëns: Violin Concerto No. 3 / Wieniawski: Violin Concerto No.2 (DG, 1983)
- Lalo: Symphonie Espagnole / Saint-Saëns: Violin Concerto No.3 (DG, 1983)
- Bach: Double Concerto, with Isaac Stern (CBS Records, 1983)
- Chausson: Concert for Violin, Piano and String Quartet (CBS Masterworks, 1983)
- Kim: Violin Concerto / Starer: Violin Concerto (Angel, 1984)
- Khatchaturian: Violin Concerto / Tchaikovsky: Meditation Op. 42, No. 1 (Angel, 1984)
- Vivaldi: Four Violin Concertos (Angel, 1984)
- Mozart: Violin Sonatas, K. 301, 302, 303 & 304 (DG, 1984)
- Mendelssohn: Concerto in E Minor / Concerto No. 1 in G Minor (Angel, 1984)
- Bach: Violin Concertos in D Minor & G Minor / Concerto for Violin & Oboe in C Minor (Angel, 1984)
- Brahms: The Sonatas for Violin and Piano / Sonatensatz / Four Hungarian Dances (Angel, 1985)
- Dvořák: Sonatine in G, Four Romantic Pieces; Smetana: From My Homeland (Angel, 1985)
- Mozart: Sinfonia Concertante K. 364 / Concertone K. 190 (DG, 1985)
- Violinkonzerte Nos. 3 & 4 by W.A. Mozart (1986)
- Mozart: The 5 Violin Concertos (DG, 1986)
- Mozart: Violin Concerto No.1, Adagio K. 261, Rondo K. 373, Rondo K. 261a (DG, 1986)
- Tradition: Itzhak Perlman Plays Jewish Melodies (1987)
- Tchaikovsky: Piano Trio in A Minor, Op. 50 (EMI, 1987)
- My Favourite Kreisler (Angel, 1987)
- Dvořák: Violin Concerto, Romance (EMI, 1987)
- Bach: Sonatas and Partitas (EMI, 1988)
- A Tribute To Jascha Heifetz (EMI, 1989)

=== From 1990s ===
- Tchaikovsky: Violin Concerto (1990)
- Saint-Saëns; Sarasate; Chausson / Ravel (DG, 1990)
- Brahms: The 3 Violin Sonatas (Sony Classical, 1990)
- Mozart: Sonatas for Piano and Violin, K. 378, K. 379 & K. 380 (DG, 1990)
- 24 Caprices: Paganini (EMI, 1991)
- Paganini: Violin Concerto No. 1 / Sarasate: Carmen Fantasy (EMI, 1991)
- Mozart: Sonatas for Piano and Violin, K. 526 & K. 547 (DG, 1991)
- Vivaldi: Four Violin Concertos (EMI, 1991)
- Vivaldi: The Four Seasons (EMI, 1991)
- Mozart: Duos for Violin & Viola / Leclair: Sonata for 2 Violins (RCA Victor, 1991)
- Vivaldi: The Four Seasons / 3 Violin Concertos (1992)
- Castelnuovo-Tedesco & Ben-Haim: Violin Concertos (EMI, 1992)
- Brahms: Violin Concerto (EMI, 1992)
- The Art of Itzhak Perlman (1993)
- Prokofiev: Violin Sonatas / Concerto No.2 (1994)
- Bits and Pieces (EMI, 1994)
- The American Album (EMI, 1994)
- Dvořák in Prague: A Celebration (Sony Classical, 1994, and Kultur Video, 2007)
- The American Album (1995)
- In the Fiddler's House (1995)
- A La Carte (EMI, 1995)
- Wieniawski by Itzhak Perlman (EMI, 1995)
- Live In The Fiddler's House (Angel, 1996)
- Bruch: Violin Concerto No. 1 (EMI, 1997)
- Cinema Serenade (Sony Classical, 1997)
- Stravinsky: Violin Concerto / Prokofiev: Violin Concerto No. 2 (Teldec 1997)
- Brahms: Double Concerto / Mendelssohn: Violin Concerto (Teldec 1997)
- Holiday Tradition (1998)
- Brahms: Violin Sonatas Nos. 1-3 (EMI, 1998)
- Itzhak Perlman's Greatest Hits (EMI, 1998)
- Concertos from My Childhood (EMI, 1999)

=== After 2000 ===
- Violin Concertos / Romance (RCA Red Seal 1968, BMG Classics, 2000)
- Mozart: Violin Concerto No. 3 (EMI, 2002)
- Classic Perlman - Rhapsody (2002)
- Beethoven: The Violin Sonatas (Decca, 2002)
- The Perlman Edition: Tradition (EMI, 2003)
- Perlman Rediscovered (2004)
- The Essential Itzhak Perlman (Sony Classical, 2009)
- Eternal Echoes: Songs and Dances for the Soul (Sony Classical, 2012) with Yitzchak Meir Helfgot
- Itzhak Perlman & Emanuel Ax: Fauré & Strauss Violin Sonatas (Universal Music Classics, 2015)
- The Perlman Sound (Warner Classics, 2015)
- Schumann – Bach – Brahms (Warner Classics, 2016)
- The Art of Itzhak Perlman (Sony Classical, 2016)

With Andre Previn

- The Easy Winners (Angel Records, 1975 / EMI, 1986)

With Placido Domingo

- Together (EMI, 1991)

With Oscar Peterson

- Side by Side (TELARC CD-83341 1994)

== Honors and awards ==
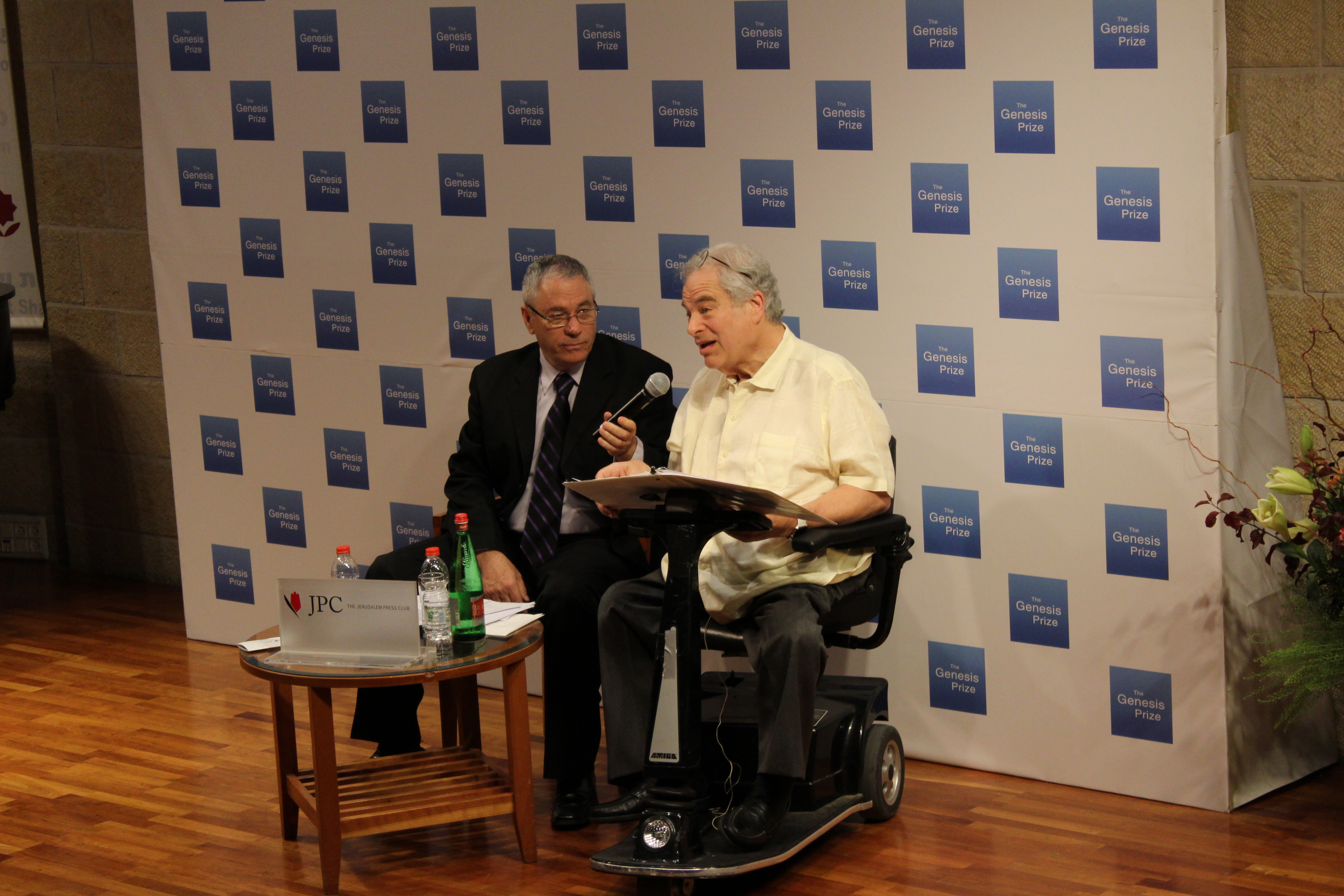
- Perlman being interviewed in the Genesis Prize 2016 Press Event
  1964: Leventritt Competition – Winner
- 1977: Grammy Award for Best Instrumental Soloist(s) Performance (with orchestra): Vivaldi: The Four Seasons
- 1978: Grammy Award for Best Chamber Music Performance:Beethoven: Sonatas for Violin and Piano (w/ Vladimir Ashkenazy)
- 1978: Grammy Award for Best Classical Album: Brahms: Concerto for Violin in D
- 1980: Grammy Award for Best Instrumental Soloist Performance (without orchestra): The Spanish Album
- 1980: Grammy Award for Best Chamber Music Performance: Music for Two Violins (w/ Pinchas Zukerman)
- 1980: Grammy Award for Best Instrumental Soloist(s) Performance (with orchestra): Brahms Violin and Cello Concerto (w/ Mstislav Rostropovich) (TIE)
- 1980: Grammy Award for Best Instrumental Soloist(s) Performance (with orchestra): Berg: Violin Concerto / Stravinsky: Violin Concerto in D (TIE)
- 1981: Grammy Award for Best Instrumental Soloist(s) Performance (with orchestra): Isaac Stern 60th Anniversary Celebration (w/ Isaac Stern & Pinchas Zukerman)
- 1981: Grammy Award for Best Chamber Music Performance: Tchaikovsky: Piano Trio in A Minor (w/ Lynn Harrell & Vladimir Ashkenazy)
- 1982: Grammy Award for Best Instrumental Soloist(s) Performance (with orchestra): Elgar: Violin Concerto
- 1987: Grammy Award for Best Chamber Music Performance: Beethoven: The Complete Piano Trios (w/ Lynn Harrell & Vladimir Ashkenazy)
- 1987: Grammy Award for Best Instrumental Soloist(s) Performance (with orchestra): Mozart: Violin Concertos Nos. 2 and 4
- 1990: Grammy Award for Best Chamber Music Performance: Brahms: The Three Violin Sonatas (w/ Daniel Barenboim)
- 1990: Grammy Award for Best Instrumental Soloist(s) Performance (with orchestra): Shostakovich: Violin Concerto No. 1 / Glazunov: Violin Concerto
- 1995: Grammy Award for Best Instrumental Soloist(s) Performance (with orchestra): The American Album — Works of Bernstein, Barber, Foss
- 1997: Elected member of the American Philosophical Society
- April 14, 1980: Newsweek featured Mr. Perlman with a cover story.
- 1986: Honored with the Medal of Liberty by President Reagan.
- 1992: Emmy Award: Outstanding Classical Program in the Performing Arts: Perlman in Russia
- 1994: Emmy Award: Outstanding Individual Achievement: Cultural Programming
- 1996: Emmy Award: Outstanding Cultural Music-Dance Program: Itzhak Perlman: In the Fiddler's House
- 1999: Emmy Award: Outstanding Classical Music-Dance Program: Itzhak Perlman: Fiddling for the Future
- 2000: Awarded the National Medal of Arts by President Clinton
- 2002: Elected member of the American Academy of Arts and Sciences
- 2003: Kennedy Center Honors
- 2005: Golden Plate Award of the American Academy of Achievement presented by Awards Council member Elie Wiesel.
- 2008: Grammy Lifetime Achievement Award
- 2015: Awarded the Presidential Medal of Freedom by President Obama
- 2016: Awarded the Genesis Prize by the Prime Minister of Israel.
- 2017: Subject of the documentary Itzhak directed by Alison Chernick.
