= 2016 New England Patriots season =

57th season in franchise history; fifth Super Bowl win

- Owner: Robert Kraft
- Head coach: Bill Belichick
- Offensive coordinator: Josh McDaniels
- Defensive coordinator: Matt Patricia
- Home stadium: Gillette Stadium

Results
- Record: 14–2
- Division place: 1st AFC East
- Playoffs: Won Divisional Playoffs (vs. Texans) 34–16; Won AFC Championship (vs. Steelers) 36–17; Won Super Bowl LI (vs. Falcons) 34–28 (OT)
- All-Pros: 7: ST Matthew Slater (1st team); QB Tom Brady (2nd team); RT Marcus Cannon (2nd team); LB Dont'a Hightower (2nd team); CB Malcolm Butler (2nd team); S Devin McCourty (2nd team); ST Nate Ebner (2nd team)
- Pro Bowlers: 4: Selected but did not participate due to participation in Super Bowl LI: QB Tom Brady; MLB Dont'a Hightower; FS Devin McCourty; ST Matthew Slater

Uniform
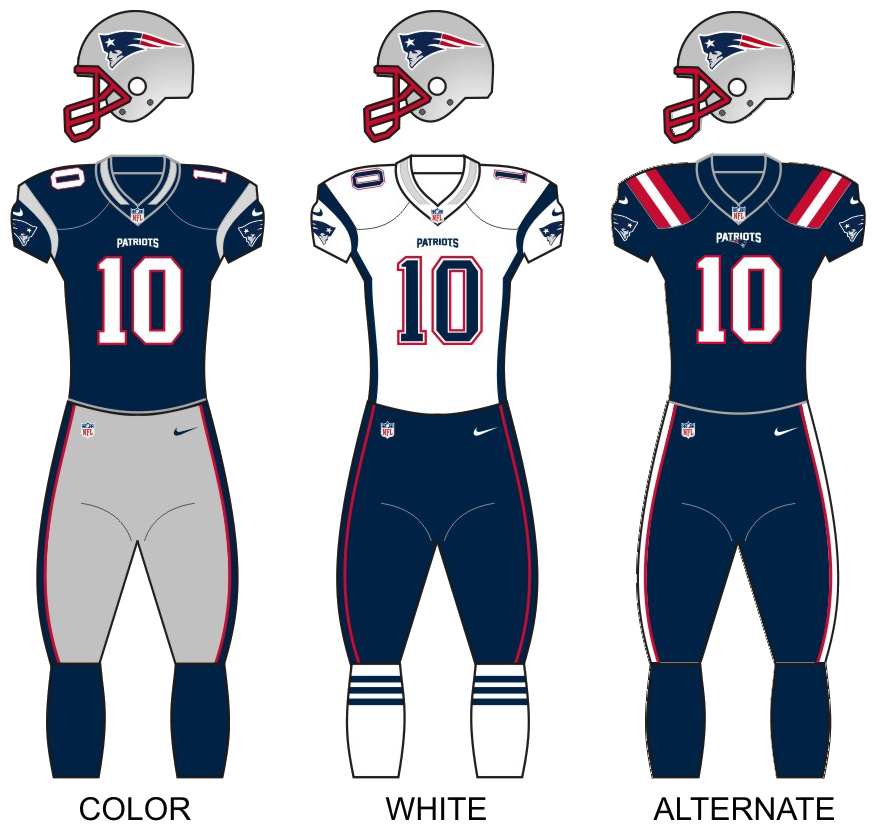

The 2016 season was the New England Patriots' 47th in the National Football League (NFL), their 57th overall and their 17th under head coach Bill Belichick. The Patriots ended the regular season with a league-best record of 14–2 and reached a number of milestones along the way: they became the first team originating in the American Football League to reach 500 franchise wins, (Note: They achieved this with a Week 12 win over the New York Jets. This includes both regular season and playoff wins.) set the record for most consecutive division titles at eight, (Note: They surpassed the record of seven consecutive division titles held by the 1979 Los Angeles Rams.) became the seventh team to go 8–0 on the road, (Note: They first accomplished this feat in the 2007 season. They are the third team to do so and win the Super Bowl, following the 1984 and 1989 San Francisco 49ers.) set the record for most pass attempts by a team without an interception to start a season, set the record for fewest interceptions thrown by a team with just 2, and led the league for fewest points allowed (250) for the first time since the 2003 season. Belichick moved into fourth place on the list for most wins as a head coach. Brady set the record for most wins by a starting quarterback and the record for the best touchdown–interception ratio in a single season. (Note: Brady threw for 28 touchdowns and 2 interceptions (a 14:1 ratio), breaking Nick Foles' mark of 27 touchdowns to 2 interceptions (13.5:1), set in 2013 while he was with the Philadelphia Eagles.)

Patriots starting quarterback Tom Brady was suspended for the first four games of the season due to his alleged role in the Deflategate scandal, marking the first time since 2008 that Brady didn't start in a game. Under backup quarterbacks Jimmy Garoppolo and Jacoby Brissett, the team went 3–1 during Brady's suspension.

In the playoffs, the Patriots appeared in the AFC Championship Game for a record sixth consecutive year (Note: In doing so, they surpassed the 1977 Oakland Raiders for most consecutive appearances in conference championship games.) and advanced to a record ninth Super Bowl appearance. (Note: They surpassed the Pittsburgh Steelers, Dallas Cowboys, and Denver Broncos who are all tied at 8 Super Bowl appearances. They would surpass their own record by appearing in the next two Super Bowls.) In Super Bowl LI, the Patriots rallied from a 28–3 deficit with 2:12 left in the third quarter to win in overtime, with a score of 34–28 against the Atlanta Falcons. This was the first Super Bowl to be decided in overtime, and was the first time that the winner erased a deficit higher than ten points. It was the franchise's fifth Super Bowl title, where Belichick and Brady set record appearances (7) and wins (5) in the Super Bowl for a head coach and a quarterback respectively. (Note: Belichick surpassed Don Shula for most appearances and Chuck Noll for most wins. Brady surpassed Joe Montana and Terry Bradshaw, who each had 4 wins. They would both exceed these records with appearances in Super Bowl LII and Super Bowl LIII and a win in the latter.) Including the playoffs, the 2016 Patriots had an average per-game point differential of 12 points, still the largest for any of New England's six Super Bowl-winning teams. They also became the first Super Bowl champions with more than 13 regular season wins since their 2004 team. They were the final team to win at least 17 games (regular season and playoffs) under the NFL's 16-game regular season format. The 2016 Patriots ranked #21 on the 100 greatest teams of all time presented by the NFL on its 100th anniversary.

For the first time since the 2002 NFL season, the Patriots did not play their intra-conference rival Indianapolis Colts at all during this season.

== Roster changes ==
Two-time Pro Bowl linebacker and 2008 AP NFL Defensive Rookie of the Year Jerod Mayo announced his retirement in February 2016. Linebacker Dane Fletcher also retired. In March, the Patriots released wide receiver Brandon LaFell and tight end Scott Chandler. The Patriots subsequently traded Pro Bowl defensive end Chandler Jones to the Arizona Cardinals in exchange for guard Jonathan Cooper and a 2016 second-round draft pick. Days later the Patriots acquired tight end Martellus Bennett from the Chicago Bears via trade. On September 7, the Patriots gained cornerback Eric Rowe in a trade that involved the Patriots giving the Philadelphia Eagles a conditional draft pick in the 2018 NFL draft. On October 26, 2016, the Patriots traded a 2017 seventh-round draft pick to the Detroit Lions and acquired linebacker Kyle Van Noy, and in the process, released offensive guard Chase Farris, who was later signed to their practice squad. Furthermore, during the month of October, the Patriots traded linebacker Jamie Collins to the Cleveland Browns for a 2017 third round draft pick. Additionally, the Patriots signed wide receiver Michael Floyd on December 15, 2016, after he was released by the Arizona Cardinals because of his DUI incident.

=== Free agency ===
- Notable departures: Tavon Wilson, Akiem Hicks, Sealver Siliga
- Notable additions: Christian Yount, Tony Steward, Ramon Humber, Frank Kearse, Chris Hogan, Chris Long, Donald Brown, Shea McClellin, Nate Washington, E. J. Biggers, Clay Harbor, Terrance Knighton, Markus Kuhn

=== Draft ===
2016 New England Patriots Draft
Round	Selection	Player	Position	College
2	60	Cyrus Jones	CB	Alabama
3	78	Joe Thuney	G	N.C. State
3	91	Jacoby Brissett	QB	N.C. State
3	96	Vincent Valentine	DT	Nebraska
4	112	Malcolm Mitchell	WR	Georgia
6	208	Kamu Grugier-Hill	OLB	Eastern Illinois
6	214	Elandon Roberts	MLB	Houston
6	221	Ted Karras	G	Illinois
7	225	Devin Lucien	WR	Arizona State

Compensatory selection

Notes

- The Patriots forfeited their first-round selection as part of the punishment for the team's Deflategate scandal. The team will also forfeit a 2017 fourth-round selection.
- The Patriots traded defensive end Chandler Jones to the Arizona Cardinals in exchange for guard Jonathan Cooper and Arizona's second-round selection (No. 61 overall).
- The Patriots traded their sixth-round selection (No. 204 overall) to the Chicago Bears in exchange for linebacker Jon Bostic.
- The Patriots traded their fourth-round selection (No. 127 overall) to the Chicago Bears in exchange for a sixth-round selection (No. 204 overall) and tight end Martellus Bennett.
- The Patriots traded their second-round pick (61st overall) to the New Orleans Saints in exchange for their third-round (78th overall) and fourth-round (112th overall) picks.
- The Patriots acquired wide receiver Keshawn Martin and the Houston Texans' sixth-round selection (196th overall) for the Patriot's fifth-round selection (166th overall).
- The Patriots obtained the Miami Dolphins' fifth-round pick (147th overall) in exchange for two of the Patriot's sixth-round picks (196th overall and 204th overall) and the Patriot's seventh-round pick (250th overall).
- The Patriots gained the Seattle Seahawks' seventh-round pick (225th overall) and Seattle's 2017 fourth-round pick in exchange for the Patriots fifth-round pick (147th overall) and the Patriots seventh-round pick (243rd overall).

=== Undrafted free agents ===
All undrafted free agents were signed just after the 2016 NFL draft concluded on April 30, 2016.

Position	Player	College
RB	D. J. Foster	Arizona State
WR	De'Runnya Wilson	Mississippi State
TE	Steven Scheu	Vanderbilt
CB	Jonathan Jones	Auburn
CB	Cre'Von LeBlanc	Florida Atlantic
CB	V'Angelo Bentley	Illinois
CB	Devante Burns	Texas A&M
LB	C. J. Johnson	Ole Miss
DT	Woodrow Hamilton	Ole Miss

Made regular season roster

=== Suspensions ===
- Quarterback Tom Brady was suspended for the first four games of the 2016 NFL season because of his alleged role in the Deflategate scandal.
- Outside linebacker Rob Ninkovich was suspended for the first four games of the seasons following him being tested and caught for a banned substance.
- Defensive tackle Alan Branch was suspended for 4 games (Weeks 12–15) after he tested positive for marijuana, therefore violating the league's policy on substances of abuse, but after appealing, Branch won and his suspension was dropped.

== Staff ==
2016 New England Patriots staff
Front office: Chairman/CEO – Robert Kraft; President – Jonathan Kraft; General manager – Bill Belichick; Director of player personnel – Nick Caserio; Director of college scouting – Monti Ossenfort; Director of scouting administration – Nancy Meier; Director of pro personnel – Dave Ziegler; Director of football research – Ernie Adams; Director of football/head coach administration – Berj Najarian; Head coaches: Head coach – Bill Belichick; Offensive coaches: Offensive coordinator/quarterbacks – Josh McDaniels; Assistant quarterbacks – Jerry Schuplinski; Running backs – Ivan Fears; Wide receivers – Chad O'Shea; Tight ends – Brian Daboll; Offensive line – Dante Scarnecchia; Coaching assistant – Nick Caley; Coaching assistant – Cole Popovich	Defensive coaches: Defensive coordinator – Matt Patricia; Defensive line – Brendan Daly; Linebackers – Brian Flores; Cornerbacks – Josh Boyer; Safeties – Steve Belichick; Coaching assistant – Mike Pellegrino; Special teams coaches: Special teams – Joe Judge; Assistant special teams – Ray Ventrone; Strength and conditioning: Head strength and conditioning – Moses Cabrera; Assistant strength and conditioning – James Hardy

== Final roster ==
2016 New England Patriots roster
Quarterbacks (QB): 12 Tom Brady; 7 Jacoby Brissett; 10 Jimmy Garoppolo; Running backs (RB): 29 LeGarrette Blount; 38 Brandon Bolden; 46 James Develin FB; 27 D. J. Foster; 33 Dion Lewis; 28 James White; Wide receivers (WR): 80 Danny Amendola PR; 11 Julian Edelman; 14 Michael Floyd; 15 Chris Hogan; 19 Malcolm Mitchell; 18 Matthew Slater; Tight ends (TE): 88 Martellus Bennett; 82 Matt Lengel	Offensive linemen (OL): 60 David Andrews C; 61 Marcus Cannon T; 71 Cameron Fleming T; 75 Ted Karras G; 69 Shaq Mason G; 77 Nate Solder T; 62 Joe Thuney G; 68 LaAdrian Waddle T; Defensive linemen (DL): 97 Alan Branch DT; 90 Malcom Brown DT; 98 Trey Flowers DE; 92 Geneo Grissom DE; 95 Chris Long DE; 50 Rob Ninkovich DE; 93 Jabaal Sheard DE; 99 Vincent Valentine DT	Linebackers (LB): 54 Dont'a Hightower MLB; 58 Shea McClellin OLB; 51 Barkevious Mingo OLB; 52 Elandon Roberts OLB; 53 Kyle Van Noy OLB; Defensive backs (DB): 21 Malcolm Butler CB; 23 Patrick Chung SS; 22 Justin Coleman CB; 43 Nate Ebner SS; 30 Duron Harmon FS; 24 Cyrus Jones CB/KR; 31 Jonathan Jones CB; 36 Brandon King SS; 32 Devin McCourty FS; 37 Jordan Richards SS; 25 Eric Rowe CB; 26 Logan Ryan CB; Special teams (ST): 6 Ryan Allen P; 49 Joe Cardona LS; 3 Stephen Gostkowski K	Practice squad: 64 Chris Barker G; 44 Trevor Bates OLB; 65 Jamil Douglas G; 66 Chase Farris G; 35 Tyler Gaffney RB; 47 Glenn Gronkowski FB; 74 Woodrow Hamilton DT; 96 Darius Kilgo DT; 16 Devin Lucien WR; 17 DeAndrew White WR; Reserve: 55 Jonathan Freeny OLB (IR); 87 Rob Gronkowski TE (IR); 63 Tre' Jackson G (PUP); 83 Greg Scruggs TE (IR); 76 Sebastian Vollmer T (PUP); 85 Michael Williams TE (IR); Rookies in italics 53 active, 6 reserve, 10 practice squad

== Schedule ==
=== Preseason ===
Week	Date	Opponent	Result	Record	Game site	NFL.com recap
1	August 11	New Orleans Saints	**W** 34–22	1–0	Gillette Stadium	Recap
2	August 18	Chicago Bears	**W** 23–22	2–0	Gillette Stadium	Recap
3	August 26	at Carolina Panthers	**W** 19–17	3–0	Bank of America Stadium	Recap
4	September 1	at New York Giants	**L** 9–17	3–1	MetLife Stadium	Recap

=== Regular season ===
Week	Date	Opponent	Result	Record	Game site	NFL.com recap
1	September 11	at Arizona Cardinals	**W** 23–21	1–0	University of Phoenix Stadium	Recap
2	September 18	**Miami Dolphins**	**W** 31–24	2–0	Gillette Stadium	Recap
3	September 22	Houston Texans	**W** 27–0	3–0	Gillette Stadium	Recap
4	October 2	**Buffalo Bills**	**L** 0–16	3–1	Gillette Stadium	Recap
5	October 9	at Cleveland Browns	**W** 33–13	4–1	FirstEnergy Stadium	Recap
6	October 16	Cincinnati Bengals	**W** 35–17	5–1	Gillette Stadium	Recap
7	October 23	at Pittsburgh Steelers	**W** 27–16	6–1	Heinz Field	Recap
8	October 30	at **Buffalo Bills**	**W** 41–25	7–1	New Era Field	Recap
9	Bye					
10	November 13	Seattle Seahawks	**L** 24–31	7–2	Gillette Stadium	Recap
11	November 20	at San Francisco 49ers	**W** 30–17	8–2	Levi's Stadium	Recap
12	November 27	at **New York Jets**	**W** 22–17	9–2	MetLife Stadium	Recap
13	December 4	Los Angeles Rams	**W** 26–10	10–2	Gillette Stadium	Recap
14	December 12	Baltimore Ravens	**W** 30–23	11–2	Gillette Stadium	Recap
15	December 18	at Denver Broncos	**W** 16–3	12–2	Sports Authority Field at Mile High	Recap
16	December 24	**New York Jets**	**W** 41–3	13–2	Gillette Stadium	Recap
17	January 1	at **Miami Dolphins**	**W** 35–14	14–2	Hard Rock Stadium	Recap

Note: Intra-division opponents are in bold text.

=== Postseason ===
Playoff round	Date	Opponent (seed)	Result	Record	Game site	NFL.com recap
Wild Card	First-round bye					
Divisional	January 14, 2017	Houston Texans (4)	**W** 34–16	1–0	Gillette Stadium	Recap
AFC Championship	January 22, 2017	Pittsburgh Steelers (3)	**W** 36–17	2–0	Gillette Stadium	Recap
Super Bowl LI	February 5, 2017	vs. Atlanta Falcons (N2)	**W** 34–28 (OT)	3–0	NRG Stadium	Recap

== Game summaries ==
=== Week 1: at Arizona Cardinals ===
Week One: New England Patriots at Arizona Cardinals – Game summary

Quarter	1	2	3	4	Total
Patriots	10	0	7	6	23
Cardinals	0	7	7	7	21

at University of Phoenix Stadium, Glendale, Arizona

- Date: September 11
- Game time: 8:30 p.m. EDT/5:30 p.m. Arizona time
- Game weather: Played indoors (retractable roof closed)
- Game attendance: 64,864
- Referee: Tony Corrente
- TV announcers (NBC): Al Michaels, Cris Collinsworth and Michele Tafoya
- Recap, Gamebook

Game information

First quarter

- NE – Chris Hogan 37-yard pass from Jimmy Garoppolo (Stephen Gostkowski kick), 7:34. Patriots 7–0. Drive: 8 plays, 74 yards, 4:13.
- NE – Stephen Gostkowski 47-yard field goal, 1:00. Patriots 10–0. Drive: 12 plays, 63 yards, 5:12.

Second quarter

- ARI – Larry Fitzgerald 3-yard pass from Carson Palmer (Chandler Catanzaro kick), 4:06. Patriots 10–7. Drive: 11 plays, 54 yards, 6:20.

Third quarter

- NE – LeGarrette Blount 8-yard run (Stephen Gostkowski kick), 10:00. Patriots 17–7. Drive: 9 plays, 75 yards, 5:00.
- ARI – David Johnson 1-yard run (Chandler Catanzaro kick), 4:29. Patriots 17–14. Drive: 5 plays, 33 yards, 1:51.

Fourth quarter

- NE – Stephen Gostkowski 53-yard field goal, 12:35. Patriots 20–14. Drive: 11 plays, 40 yards, 6:54.
- ARI – Larry Fitzgerald 1-yard pass from Carson Palmer (Chandler Catanzaro kick), 9:46. Cardinals 21–20. Drive: 7 plays, 79 yards, 2:49.
- NE – Stephen Gostkowski 32-yard field goal, 3:44. Patriots 23–21. Drive: 13 plays, 61 yards, 6:02.

Top passers

- NE – Jimmy Garoppolo – 24/33, 264 yards, TD
- ARI – Carson Palmer – 24/37, 271 yards, 2 TD

Top rushers

- NE – LeGarrette Blount – 22 rushes, 70 yards, TD
- ARI – David Johnson – 16 rushes, 89 yards, TD

Top receivers

- NE – Julian Edelman – 7 receptions, 66 yards
- ARI – Larry Fitzgerald – 8 receptions, 81 yards, 2 TD

In a battle of the two conference runners-up from the 2015 season, the New England Patriots entered their first game of the 2016 NFL season against the Arizona Cardinals with starting quarterback Jimmy Garoppolo replacing Tom Brady, who was serving his four-game suspension, also the first time since 2008 that Brady did not start a game.

Following a Cardinals punt on the first possession of the game, the Patriots took their first possession of the season for a touchdown. Garoppolo completed 4 of 5 passes for 75 yards on a 10-play drive, ending with a 37-yard touchdown pass to wide receiver Chris Hogan. On the Cardinals' next drive, aided by a 39-yard completion from quarterback Carson Palmer to wide receiver John Brown, the Cardinals reached Patriots territory, but were forced to punt. Starting from their own 8-yard line, the Patriots cashed in again. Despite only reaching the Cardinals' 29-yard line, placekicker Stephen Gostkowski nailed a 47-yard field goal for a 10–0 Patriots lead. The Cardinals drove to the Patriots' 31, but on 3rd-and-2, Palmer was sacked for an 8-yard loss. Rather than attempt a 57-yard field goal, the Cardinals punted. On 2nd-and-8, Garoppolo was sacked by linebacker Markus Golden and fumbled, with ex-Patriot Chandler Jones recovering at the Patriots' 39, but a 15-yard unsportsmanlike conduct penalty sent the Cardinals to their own 46. The field position did not hurt Arizona, as they drove 54 yards in 11 plays, scoring on Palmer's 1-yard touchdown pass to wide receiver Larry Fitzgerald, trimming the deficit to 10–7. Neither team got a first down for the rest of the half. The Patriots kicked off the second half by storming 75 yards in 9 plays, with Garoppolo converting a 3rd-and-6 with a 10-yard run and a 3rd-and-7 with a 28-yard completion to wide receiver Malcolm Mitchell, before running back LeGarrette Blount finished the drive with an 8-yard touchdown run, extending the lead to 17–7. The Cardinals punted on their next drive, but on the first play of the Patriots' next drive, Blount fumbled, with defensive end Calais Campbell recovering for Arizona at the Patriots' 33. With the good field position, Arizona marched 33 yards in just five plays and running back David Johnson scored on a 1-yard touchdown run, trimming the score to 17–14. The Patriots countered with a 50-yard drive to the Cardinals 25. On 3rd-and-4, Garoppolo hit wide receiver Julian Edelman for a first down, but the play was nullified for a holding penalty on tight end Martellus Bennett and the Patriots settled for 53-yard field goal two plays later. Andre Ellington returned the ensuing kickoff 16 yards to the Cardinals 16. This sparked a 79-yard, 7-play drive, aided by a 45-yard run by Johnson, with Palmer finding Fitzgerald on another 1-yard touchdown pass, giving the Cardinals their first lead at 21–20. Marching 61 yards, Garoppolo converted a 3rd-and-15 with a 32-yard pass to wide receiver Danny Amendola for a first down. "That's the play I remember", he later told Sports Illustrated. He completed a 3rd-and-3 7-yard pass to running back James White, Blount ran for 13 yards on 3rd-and-11 and the Patriots kicked a 32-yard field goal with 3:44 remaining to retake the lead, 23–21.

Starting at their own 8, the Cardinals reached the Patriots' 33 where two costly mistakes occurred. Offensive guard Earl Watford was flagged for holding, moving the ball back to the 43. On the next play, Palmer attempted a screen pass to Andre Ellington, for a four-yard loss, but on 3rd-and-23 at the Patriots 47, Palmer threw a clutch 18-yard pass to Brown to the Patriots' 29-yard line, setting up a game-winning 47-yard field-goal attempt by placekicker Chandler Catanzaro with 36 seconds left. However, rookie long snapper Kameron Canaday delivered a low snap, causing Catanzaro to miss wide left. Garoppolo took a knee and the Patriots got their first win of the season.

=== Week 2: vs. Miami Dolphins ===
Week Two: Miami Dolphins at New England Patriots – Game summary

Quarter	1	2	3	4	Total
Dolphins	0	3	7	14	24
Patriots	14	10	7	0	31

at Gillette Stadium, Foxborough, Massachusetts

- Date: September 18
- Game time: 1:00 p.m. EDT
- Game weather: 79 °F (26 °C), cloudy
- Game attendance: 66,829
- Referee: Craig Wrolstad
- TV announcers (CBS): Greg Gumbel, Trent Green and Jamie Erdahl
- Recap, Gamebook

Game information

First quarter

- NE – Danny Amendola 12-yard pass from Jimmy Garoppolo (Stephen Gostkowski kick), 10:53. Patriots 7–0. Drive: 8 plays, 75 yards, 4:07.
- NE – Martellus Bennett 20-yard pass from Jimmy Garoppolo (Stephen Gostkowski kick), 6:22. Patriots 14–0. Drive: 7 plays, 75 yards, 3:10.

Second quarter

- NE – Danny Amendola 10-yard pass from Jimmy Garoppolo (Stephen Gostkowski kick), 13:10. Patriots 21–0. Drive: 12 plays, 76 yards, 6:21.
- NE – Stephen Gostkowski 34-yard field goal, 2:48. Patriots 24–0. Drive 9 plays, 36 yards, 3:01.
- MIA – Andrew Franks 27-yard field goal, 0:00. Patriots 24–3. Drive 9 plays, 77 yards, 0:58.

Third quarter

- NE – LeGarrette Blount 9-yard run (Stephen Gostkowski kick), 8:44. Patriots 31–3. Drive: 5 plays, 68 yards, 2:51
- MIA – Kenny Stills 24-yard pass from Ryan Tannehill (Andrew Franks kick), 5:45. Patriots 31–10. Drive: 7 plays, 75 yards, 2:59.

Fourth quarter

- MIA – Jordan Cameron 12-yard pass from Ryan Tannehill (Andrew Franks kick), 14:51. Patriots 31–17. Drive: 5 plays, 88 yards, 4:43.
- MIA – Kenyan Drake 7-yard run (Andrew Franks kick), 6:06. Patriots 31–24. Drive: 9 plays, 74 yards, 4:43

Top passers

- MIA – Ryan Tannehill – 32/45, 387 yards, 2 TD, 2 INT
- NE – Jimmy Garoppolo – 18/26, 232 yards, 3 TD

Top rushers

- MIA – Ryan Tannehill – 6 rushes, 35 yards
- NE – LeGarrette Blount – 29 rushes, 123 yards, TD

Top receivers

- MIA – Jarvis Landry – 10 receptions, 135 yards
- NE – Martellus Bennett – 5 receptions, 114 yards, TD

After taking the opening kickoff, the Patriots stormed 75 yards in just 8 plays, scoring on Jimmy Garoppolo's 12-yard touchdown pass to wide receiver Danny Amendola for an early 7–0 lead. After a Dolphins three-and-out, the Patriots raced 75 yards in just 7 plays, on a nearly identical drive, and Garoppolo found Martellus Bennett on a 20-yard touchdown pass for a 14–0 lead. After the Dolphins failed to move the ball again, the Patriots marched 76 yards in over six minutes, with another Amendola touchdown catch extending the Patriots' lead to 21–0 a few plays into the second quarter. After a series of punts, the Patriots reached their 43, but Amendola fumbled at the Dolphins' 42 after a 15-yard reception, and linebacker Kiko Alonso recovered at the Dolphins' 42. However, two plays later wide receiver Jarvis Landry lost a fumble, with defensive end Chris Long recovering at the Patriots' 48. On the fifth play of the drive, Garoppolo was driven to the ground by Alonso on a completion to wide receiver Malcolm Mitchell and suffered a shoulder injury that required transportation to Massachusetts General Hospital; he finished with 232 yards and three touchdowns. Rookie quarterback Jacoby Brissett took over, and running back LeGarrette Blount drove the Patriots to the Dolphins' 16. Kicker Stephen Gostkowski finished the drive with a 34-yard field goal for a 24–0 lead. Four plays into the Dolphins' next possession, Jamie Collins intercepted quarterback Ryan Tannehill and returned the ball 13 yards to the Dolphins' 49. However, the Dolphins' defense forced the Patriots to go three-and-out and the Dolphins finally got on the board following a quick 77-yard drive that ended with kicker Andrew Franks' 27-yard field goal just before halftime, trimming the deficit to 24–3. The Dolphins stormed out of the gate in the second half, reaching the Patriots' 34, but running back Jay Ajayi fumbled and linebacker Jonathan Freeny recovered for the Patriots. The Patriots then raced 68 yards in just five plays to score on a 9-yard touchdown run by Blount, increasing their lead to 31-3 and seemingly put the game away. The Dolphins responded with a 7-play, 75-yard drive capped off by Tannehill's 24-yard touchdown pass to wide receiver Kenny Stills, trimming the deficit to 31–10. After a Patriots three-and-out, the Dolphins stormed 88 yards in just five plays, aided by a pass interference penalty on Logan Ryan, and scored on a 12-yard touchdown pass from Tannehill to Jordan Cameron, trimming the deficit to just 31–17 early in the fourth quarter. The Patriots drove to the Dolphins' 35 on their next possession, but a penalty and nearly lost fumble forced the Patriots to punt. The Dolphins then went 74 yards and scored on a 7-yard touchdown run by rookie running back Kenyan Drake, reducing a 28-point third-quarter deficit to just seven with 6:06 remaining in the game. The Patriots drove all the way to the Dolphins' 21 on their next drive, but Gostkowski missed a 39-yard field goal wide right that would have put the game away with 1:04 remaining. The Dolphins drove to the Patriots' 29 in the final moments, but Tannehill was intercepted by safety Duron Harmon in the end zone with 0:02 left to seal the win for the Patriots.

With the win, the Patriots improved to 2–0. Tannehill threw for 387 yards, but his two interceptions and Ajayi's fumble proved to be costly. Brissett completed 6 of 9 passes for 92 yards. LeGarrette Blount ran for 123 yards and a touchdown. After the game, it was announced that Garoppolo would miss four to six weeks and that Brissett would start the next two games.

=== Week 3: vs. Houston Texans ===
Week Three: Houston Texans at New England Patriots – Game summary

Quarter	1	2	3	4	Total
Texans	0	0	0	0	0
Patriots	10	0	10	7	27

at Gillette Stadium, Foxborough, Massachusetts

- Date: September 22
- Game time: 8:25 p.m. EDT
- Game weather: 68 °F (20 °C), clear
- Game attendance: 66,829
- Referee: Walt Coleman
- TV announcers (CBS/NFLN/Twitter): Jim Nantz, Phil Simms and Tracy Wolfson
- Recap, Gamebook

Game information

First quarter

- NE – Stephen Gostkowski 24-yard field goal, 2:07. Patriots 3–0. Drive: 10 plays, 74 yards, 4:52.
- NE – Jacoby Brissett 27-yard run (Stephen Gostkowski kick), 1:54. Patriots 10–0. Drive: 1 play, 22 yards, 0:07.

Second quarter

- No scoring plays.

Third quarter

- NE – Stephen Gostkowski 25-yard field goal, 8:19. Patriots 13–0. Drive: 13 plays, 71 yards, 6:41.
- NE – LeGarrette Blount 1-yard run (Stephen Gostkowski kick), 5:41. Patriots 20–0. Drive: 6 plays, 21 yards, 2:31.

Fourth quarter

- NE – LeGarrette Blount 41-yard run (Stephen Gostkowski kick), 11:00. Patriots 27–0. Drive: 2 plays, 47 yards, 0:40.

Top passers

- HOU – Brock Osweiler – 24/41, 196 yards, INT
- NE – Jacoby Brissett – 11/19, 103 yards

Top rushers

- HOU – Lamar Miller – 21 rushes, 80 yards
- NE – LeGarrette Blount – 24 rushes, 105 yards, 2 TD

Top receivers

- HOU – DeAndre Hopkins – 4 receptions, 56 yards
- NE – Julian Edelman – 4 receptions, 38 yards

With Tom Brady in his third game of suspension and Jimmy Garoppolo injured, the Patriots, wearing Color Rush uniforms, started backup quarterback Jacoby Brissett.

The Houston Texans drove 36 yards to their own 47 on their second drive, but were forced to punt. The Patriots responded by driving 74 yards to 6-yard line, but the drive stalled, and the Patriots settled for a 24-yard field goal by Gostkowski and an early 3–0 lead. On the ensuing kickoff, Charles James II returned the ball 18 yards to the Texans' 17 and fumbled, but was ruled down by contact. The Patriots challenged and the ruling was changed, with the Patriots in possession at the Houston 22-yard line. After a false start penalty on offensive tackle Marcus Cannon, Brissett ran for a 27-yard touchdown, increasing the lead to 10–0. The Texans managed to reach midfield on their next drive, but after an illegal formation penalty moved them 5 yards back, linebacker Jamie Collins intercepted quarterback Brock Osweiler and returned the ball 18 yards to the Texans' 43. The Texans forced a punt and moved the ball on their next drive, but were forced to punt. Late in the half, the Texans once again drove to midfield, but were once again forced to punt. The Patriots then ran out the clock and took a 10–0 lead to the locker room. The Patriots marched 71 yards in 13 plays to the Texans' 7-yard line on the opening drive of the second half, but the Houston defense kept them out of the end zone and Gostkowski kicked a 25-yard field goal for a 13–0 lead. Once again, the Texans lost a fumble on the kickoff; this time, Tyler Ervin was stripped by Nate Ebner with Jordan Richards recovering at the Patriots' 21. Six plays later, Blount scored on a 1-yard touchdown run, extending the lead to 20–0 late in the third quarter. Ervin returned the kick 21 yards to the Texans' 23. The Texans drove 44 yards to the Patriots' 36-yard line but turned the ball over on downs early in the fourth quarter when Osweiler threw incomplete on 4th-and-4. Danny Amendola returned a punt 10 yards to the Patriots' 47. Two plays later, Blount burst through for a 41-yard touchdown run, extending the lead to 27–0. The Texans turned the ball over on downs two more times before running out the clock to end the game.

The Patriots forced three turnovers and allowed zero points, improving to a record of 3–0.

=== Week 4: vs. Buffalo Bills ===
Week Four: Buffalo Bills at New England Patriots – Game summary

Quarter	1	2	3	4	Total
Bills	7	6	3	0	16
Patriots	0	0	0	0	0

at Gillette Stadium, Foxborough, Massachusetts

- Date: October 2
- Game time: 1:00 p.m. EDT
- Game weather: 56 °F (13 °C), cloudy
- Game attendance: 66,829
- Referee: Pete Morelli
- TV announcers (CBS): Ian Eagle, Dan Fouts and Evan Washburn
- Recap, Gamebook

Game information

First quarter

- BUF – LeSean McCoy 7-yard pass from Tyrod Taylor (Dan Carpenter kick), 5:31. Bills 7–0. Drive: 12 plays, 65 yards, 7:11.

Second quarter

- BUF – Dan Carpenter 34-yard field goal, 14:49. Bills 10–0. Drive: 10 plays, 52 yards, 3:58.
- BUF – Dan Carpenter 43-yard field goal, 7:46. Bills 13–0. Drive: 12 plays, 74 yards, 4:40.

Third quarter

- BUF – Dan Carpenter 44-yard field goal, 0:28. Bills 16–0. Drive: 11 plays, 44 yards, 4:27.

Fourth quarter

- No scoring plays.

Top passers

- BUF – Tyrod Taylor – 27/39, 246 yards, TD
- NE – Jacoby Brissett – 17/27, 205 yards

Top rushers

- BUF – LeSean McCoy – 19 rushes, 70 yards
- NE – LeGarrette Blount – 13 rushes, 54 yards

Top receivers

- BUF – Robert Woods – 7 receptions, 89 yards
- NE – Martellus Bennett – 5 receptions, 109 yards

The Patriots stayed at home for a matchup against the Tyrod Taylor-led Bills. On the first play of scrimmage, Brissett hit Edelman on a 90-yard catch-and-run to the Bills' 1, but the play was nullified by a holding penalty on former Bill Chris Hogan. The Patriots didn't get a first down and punted. Starting from their own 35, the Bills marched 65 yards in over 7 minutes, scoring on a 7-yard touchdown pass from Taylor to LeSean McCoy. After a Patriots three-and-out, the Bills moved to the Patriots' 16, but settled for Dan Carpenter's 34-yard field goal on the second play of the second quarter, making the score 10–0. After forcing the Patriots to punt, the Bills drove 71 yards and Carpenter ended the drive with a 43-yard field goal, extending the lead to 13–0. The Patriots drove all the way to the Bills' 18 on their ensuing possession, but Brissett was strip-sacked by Zach Brown, with Preston Brown recovering for the Bills. Starting at their own 9, the Bills drove to their own 42, but punted. The Patriots punted as well, and the Bills led 13–0 at halftime. After forcing the Bills to punt on the opening drive, the Patriots drove to the Bills 30, but Gostkowski missed a 48-yard field goal. The Bills countered, reaching the Patriots 29, but Carpenter missed a 47-yard field goal. After yet another Patriots punt, Ben Tate returned the punt 18 yards to the Bills' 30. The Bills reached the Patriots' 26 and Carpenter nailed a 44-yard field goal, stretching the score to 16–0. Midway through the fourth quarter, the Patriots drove all the way to the Bills' 21, but turned the ball over on downs. After a Bills punt, the Patriots reached the Bills' 44, but the clock ran out.

With the loss, the Patriots fell to 3–1. This was the first time ever that the Patriots had been shut out at home with Bill Belichick as their head coach, their first shut out at home overall since 1993, and was their first shutout loss since December 10, 2006. This was also the team's first shutout loss to the Bills since their 2003 Super Bowl-winning season.

=== Week 5: at Cleveland Browns ===
Week Five: New England Patriots at Cleveland Browns – Game summary

Quarter	1	2	3	4	Total
Patriots	16	7	7	3	33
Browns	7	0	0	6	13

at FirstEnergy Stadium, Cleveland, Ohio

- Date: October 9
- Game time: 1:00 p.m. EDT
- Game weather: 58 °F (14 °C), sunny
- Game attendance: 67,431
- Referee: Bill Vinovich
- TV announcers (CBS): Greg Gumbel, Trent Green and Jamie Erdahl
- Recap, Gamebook

Game information

First quarter

- NE – LeGarrette Blount 1-yard run (Stephen Gostkowski kick), 10:28. Patriots 7–0. Drive: 8 plays, 80 yards, 3:13.
- CLE – Andrew Hawkins 11-yard pass from Cody Kessler (Cody Parkey kick), 6:09. Tied 7–7. Drive: 9 plays, 75 yards, 4:19.
- NE – Martellus Bennett 7-yard pass from Tom Brady (Stephen Gostkowski kick), 2:06. Patriots 14–7. Drive: 8 plays, 75 yards, 4:03.
- NE – Cody Kessler fumble out of bounds in end zone for a safety, 1:20. Patriots 16–7.

Second quarter

- NE – Martellus Bennett 5-yard pass from Tom Brady (Stephen Gostkowski kick), 12:10. Patriots 23–7. Drive: 8 plays, 64 yards, 4:10.

Third quarter

- NE – Martellus Bennett 37-yard pass from Tom Brady (Stpehen Gostkowski kick), 12:24. Patriots 30–7. Drive: 8 plays, 75 yards, 2:36.

Fourth quarter

- CLE – Connor Hamlett 17-yard pass from Charlie Whitehurst (pass failed), 14:05. Patriots 30–13. Drive 7 plays, 80 yards, 3:22.
- NE – Stephen Gostkowski 31-yard field goal, 7:42. Patriots 33–13. Drive 11 plays, 72 yards, 6:23.

Top passers

- NE – Tom Brady – 28/40, 406 yards, 3 TD
- CLE – Charlie Whitehurst – 14/24, 182 yards, TD, INT

Top rushers

- NE – LeGarrette Blount – 18 rushes, 37 yards, TD
- CLE – Isaiah Crowell – 13 rushes, 22 yards

Top receivers

- NE – Chris Hogan – 4 receptions, 114 yards
- CLE – Gary Barnidge – 5 receptions, 76 yards

Tom Brady returned from his four-game suspension against the Cleveland Browns.

After forcing the Browns to a quick three-and-out on their opening drive, Brady led the Patriots on an 8-play, 80-yard drive, scoring on a 1-yard touchdown run by Blount to take an early 7–0 lead. The Browns countered on their next drive, marching 75 yards to score on an 11-yard touchdown pass from rookie Cody Kessler to Andrew Hawkins. The Patriots answered right back, aided by a 36-yard dump-off pass to James White, in a 75-yard drive ending with Brady's 7-yard touchdown pass to Bennett, retaking the lead 14–7. On the second play of the Browns' next drive, Kessler fumbled the snap and kicked the ball out of the end zone for a safety, extending the Patriots' lead to 16–7. Edelman returned the ensuing free kick 9 yards to the Patriots' 36. Aided by a 43-yard pass to Hogan, Brady found Bennett again, capping off the 8-play, 64-yard drive with a 5-yard touchdown pass, widening the lead to 23–7. Charlie Whitehurst took over for an injured Kessler on the next drive, but the Browns went nowhere and punted. The Patriots seemed poised to widen their lead on their next drive, racing all the way to the Browns' 1-yard line, but Blount couldn't get in on 3rd or 4th down, and the Patriots turned the ball over on downs. Three possessions later, the Patriots reached the Browns' 32, but Gostkowski missed a 50-yard field goal attempt wide right. The Browns ran out the rest of the clock, and the Patriots held their 23–7 lead going into halftime. The Patriots started the second half like the first, racing 75 yards in 8 plays, with Brady hitting Bennett for a 37-yard touchdown, Bennett's third touchdown catch of the game, increasing the lead to 30–7. The Browns drove to the Patriots' 39 on their ensuing possession, but Whitehurst was intercepted by Patrick Chung, who returned it 4 yards to the Patriots' 34. Three possessions later, the Browns raced 80 yards in just 7 plays, with Whitehurst throwing a 17-yard touchdown pass to Connor Hamlett, trimming the deficit to 30–13, but the two-point conversion attempt failed, keeping the deficit at three scores. The Patriots answered right back, advancing to the Browns 13, but had to settle for a 31-yard Gostkowski field goal, extending the lead to 33–13. Terrelle Pryor took over for Whitehurst midway through the Browns' next possession, but the Browns turned the ball over on downs. Both teams took turns running out the rest of the clock, and the Patriots went to 4–1.

In the win, Tom Brady collected the eighth 400+-passing-yard game of his career.

=== Week 6: vs. Cincinnati Bengals ===
Week Six: Cincinnati Bengals at New England Patriots – Game summary

Quarter	1	2	3	4	Total
Bengals	0	7	7	3	17
Patriots	3	7	15	10	35

at Gillette Stadium, Foxborough, Massachusetts

- Date: October 16
- Game time: 1:00 p.m. EDT
- Game weather: 66 °F (19 °C), sunny
- Game attendance: 66,829
- Referee: Ronald Torbert
- TV announcers (CBS): Ian Eagle, Dan Fouts and Evan Washburn
- Recap, Gamebook

Game information

First quarter

- NE – Stephen Gostkowski 46-yard field goal, 12:06. Patriots 3–0. Drive: 8 plays, 47 yards, 2:54.

Second quarter

- CIN – Andy Dalton 2-yard run (Mike Nugent kick), 3:10. Bengals 7–3. Drive: 7 plays, 60 yards, 3:26.
- NE – James White 15-yard pass from Tom Brady (Stephen Gostkowski kick), 1:01. Patriots 10–7. Drive: 8 plays, 75 yards, 2:09.

Third quarter

- CIN – Brandon LaFell 5-yard pass from Andy Dalton (Mike Nugent kick), 11:14. Bengals 14–10. Drive: 9 plays, 80 yards, 3:46.
- NE – Andy Dalton sacked by Dont'a Hightower for a safety, 7:05. Bengals 14–12.
- NE – Rob Gronkowski 4-yard pass from Tom Brady (Stephen Gostkowski kick), 5:00. Patriots 19–14. Drive 5 plays, 68 yards, 2:05.
- NE – James White 4-yard pass from Tom Brady (kick failed, wide left), 2:58. Patriots 25–14. Drive 4 plays, 53 yards, 1:35.

Fourth quarter

- CIN – Mike Nugent 25-yard field goal, 12:34. Patriots 25–17. Drive 12 plays, 68 yards, 5:24.
- NE – Stephen Gostkowski 31-yard field goal, 6:04. Patriots 28–17. Drive 12 plays, 62 yards, 6:30.
- NE – LeGarrette Blount 1-yard run (Stephen Gostkowski kick), 0:57. Patriots 35–17. Drive 9 plays, 50 yards, 2:35.

Top passers

- CIN – Andy Dalton – 21/31, 254 yards, TD
- NE – Tom Brady – 29/35, 376 yards, 3 TD

Top rushers

- CIN – Giovani Bernard – 15 rushes, 49 yards
- NE – LeGarrette Blount – 13 rushes, 50 yards, TD

Top receivers

- CIN – A. J. Green – 6 receptions, 88 yards
- NE – Rob Gronkowski – 7 receptions, 162 yards, TD

The Patriots faced the Bengals at home, their first meeting with Cincinnati since the "We're on to Cincinnati" game that marked the turning point in a Super Bowl-winning season two years earlier.

The Patriots took the opening kickoff and marched 47 yards in 8 plays, with placekicker Stephen Gostkowski hitting a 46-yard field goal for an early 3–0 lead. The Bengals moved the ball well, reaching midfield, but couldn't get any further and punted. The Patriots once again drove into Cincinnati territory on their next drive, but were forced to punt. The Bengals then gained 89 yards in just under 9 minutes, but the Patriots' defense made a goal-line stand to keep the Bengals scoreless. On 3rd-and-8 from the Patriots 38, Andy Dalton connected with running back Giovani Bernard for a 32-yard gain to the Patriots' 6. On 1st-and-goal, Bernard gained 5 yards to the Patriots' 1. On 2nd-and-goal, Bernard was stuffed on for no gain. On 3rd-and-goal, Dalton threw an incomplete pass, bringing up 4th-and-goal at the 1. The Patriots stuffed Bernard for no gain, causing a turnover on downs. The Patriots couldn't capitalize and were forced to punt. The Bengals raced 60 yards in just 7 plays, scoring on a 2-yard touchdown run by Dalton. The Patriots countered, charging 75 yards in just 8 plays, culminating with Brady's 15-yard touchdown pass to running back James White. The Patriots led 10–7 at the halfway point.

The Bengals took the opening possession of the second half and rushed 80 yards in 9 plays, ending with Dalton throwing a five-yard touchdown pass to former Patriot Brandon LaFell, giving Cincinnati a 14–10 lead. The Patriots punted on their next drive, but three plays after penning the Bengals at their own 16, Dont'a Hightower burst through the middle on a blitz and sacked Dalton for a safety. Now trailing 14–12, the Patriots embarked on a 68-yard drive, with Brady throwing for every yard, that ended in a 4-yard touchdown reception by Rob Gronkowski, putting the Patriots ahead 19–14 late in the third quarter. After a Bengals three-and-out, the Patriots began to take over. Starting at their own 47, the Patriots went on a quick four-play, 53-yard drive, with Brady finding White again on a 4-yard touchdown pass. Gostkowski missed the extra point for the second consecutive game, but the Patriots led 25–14. With a 38-yard completion to Gronkowski on that drive, Brady completed his 5,000th pass; the completion put Brady fourth in all-time quarterback completions while Gronkowski also reached the 22nd game with at least 100 receiving yards in his career, tying Jackie Smith for third all-time by a tight end. The Bengals responded by driving 68 yards to the Patriots' 7, but settled for a 25-yard field goal by Mike Nugent, shrinking the deficit to just one score at 25-17 early in the fourth quarter. The Patriots countered again by slowly advancing 62 yards in over six minutes with a 31-yard Gostkowski field goal, widening the lead to 28–17. The Patriots' defense forced the Bengals to punt again on their next drive, with Julian Edelman returning 23 yards to midfield. The Patriots put the game away with a 9-play, 50-yard drive, scoring on running back LeGarrette Blount's three-yard touchdown run. Two plays later the game was over.

The Patriots improved to 5–1.

=== Week 7: at Pittsburgh Steelers ===
Week Seven: New England Patriots at Pittsburgh Steelers – Game summary

Quarter	1	2	3	4	Total
Patriots	7	7	6	7	27
Steelers	0	10	3	3	16

at Heinz Field, Pittsburgh, Pennsylvania

- Date: October 23
- Game time: 4:25 p.m. EDT
- Game weather: 63 °F (17 °C), sunny
- Game attendance: 66,009
- Referee: Craig Wrolstad
- TV announcers (CBS): Jim Nantz, Phil Simms and Tracy Wolfson
- Recap, Gamebook

Game information

First quarter

- NE – James White 19-yard pass from Tom Brady (Stephen Gostkowski kick), 2:55. Patriots 7–0. Drive: 13 plays 80 yards, 7:23.

Second quarter

- NE – LeGarrette Blount 3-yard run (Stephen Gostkowski kick), 10:58. Patriots 14–0. Drive: 11 plays, 84 yards, 4:46.
- PIT – Darrius Heyward-Bey 14-yard pass from Landry Jones (Chris Boswell kick), 9:02. Patriots 14–7. Drive: 5 plays, 71 yards, 1:56.
- PIT – Chris Boswell 32-yard field goal, 0:02. Patriots 14–10. Drive: 10 plays, 66 yards, 1:45.

Third quarter

- PIT – Chris Boswell 46-yard field goal, 8:44. Patriots 14–13. Drive: 9 plays, 48 yards, 4:49.
- NE – Rob Gronkowski 32-yard pass from Tom Brady (kick failed, wide right), 6:19. Patriots 20–13. Drive: 5 plays, 75 yards, 2:25.

Fourth quarter

- PIT – Chris Boswell 44-yard field goal, 14:44. Patriots 20–16. Drive: 12 plays, 42 yards, 6:35.
- NE – LeGarrette Blount 5-yard run (Stephen Gostkowski kick), 11:44. Patriots 27–16. Drive: 6 plays, 75 yards, 3:00.

Top passers

- NE – Tom Brady – 19/26, 222 yards, 2 TD
- PIT – Landry Jones – 29/47, 281 yards, TD, INT

Top rushers

- NE – LeGarrette Blount – 24 rushes, 127 yards, 2 TD
- PIT – Le'Veon Bell – 21 rushes, 81 yards

Top receivers

- NE – Rob Gronkowski – 4 receptions, 93 yards, TD
- PIT – Antonio Brown – 7 receptions, 106 yards

In the game at Heinz Field, the Patriots faced off against the Pittsburgh Steelers, who started backup quarterback Landry Jones in place of Ben Roethlisberger, was out with a knee injury.

On the Patriots' first offensive play following a Steelers three-and-out, Tom Brady hit Chris Hogan for a 12-yard gain, but Hogan was stripped by Jarvis Jones, who recovered the ball at the Patriots' 45. The Steelers drove to the Patriots' 16, but on 3rd-and-6, Jones was intercepted in the end zone by Malcolm Butler on a pass intended for Antonio Brown. Taking over at their own 20, the Patriots went on an 80-yard, 13-play drive, with Brady finding James White on a 19-yard touchdown pass. After the Steelers went three-and-out again, the Patriots marched 84 more yards, scoring on LeGarrette Blount's 3-yard touchdown four minutes into the second quarter, increasing the Patriots' lead to 14–0. On the Steelers' next drive, Brown's 51-yard catch was the key play leading up to a 14-yard touchdown catch by Darrius Heyward-Bey. With the score 14–7, a bad punt by Ryan Allen gave the Steelers the ball at their 47. Six plays later, Jones hit Heyward-Bey for a 14-yard touchdown, but the play was nullified by a holding penalty on Chris Hubbard. On the next play, Jones threw an incompletion and then Chris Boswell missed a 42-yard field goal. The Patriots reached midfield on their next drive, but were forced to punt. Allen seemingly pinned the Steelers at their own 6, but Pittsburgh challenged that the ball had entered the end zone. The ruling was reversed, giving the Steelers the ball at the 20. With the better field position, the Steelers drove 66 yards to the Patriots' 14, where Boswell kicked a 32-yard field goal to close the score to 14–10 at halftime.

In the second half, following a Patriots three-and-out, the Steelers drove to the Patriots' 28 and Boswell made a 46-yard field goal, trimming the score to 14–13. The Patriots countered with a 75-yard, 5-play drive ending with a 36-yard touchdown pass from Brady to Rob Gronkowski, increasing the lead to 20–13, but Stephen Gostkowski missed his second extra point of the season. Justin Gilbert returned the ensuing kickoff 32 yards to the Steelers' 42. Aided by the good field position, Pittsburgh drove 42 yards to the Patriots' 26, and Boswell kicked a 44-yard field goal that trimmed the score to 20–16 on the third play of the fourth quarter. The Patriots countered again with a 75-yard drive and 5-yard touchdown run by Blount, increasing the lead to 27–16. The Steelers were forced to punt on their next drive, but Edelman fumbled and the Steelers recovered at the Patriots' 43. The Steelers reached the 36, but Boswell missed a 54-yard field goal, keeping the Patriots ahead 27–16. Later in the fourth quarter, the Steelers drove to the Patriots' 45 but turned the ball over on downs after Jones threw an incomplete pass on 4th-and-11. Brady took a knee and the Patriots won the game.

With the win, the Patriots improved to 6–1 and 3-0 under Brady.

=== Week 8: at Buffalo Bills ===
Week Eight: New England Patriots at Buffalo Bills – Game summary

Quarter	1	2	3	4	Total
Patriots	14	10	14	3	41
Bills	3	7	7	8	25

at New Era Field, Orchard Park, New York

- Date: October 30
- Game time: 1:00 p.m. EDT
- Game weather: 49 °F (9 °C), rain
- Game attendance: 70,442
- Referee: John Parry
- TV announcers (CBS): Ian Eagle, Dan Fouts and Evan Washburn
- Recap, Gamebook

Game information

First quarter

- BUF – Dan Carpenter 23-yard field goal, 11:07. Bills 3–0. Drive: 10 plays, 70 yards, 3:55.
- NE – Danny Amendola 9-yard pass from Tom Brady (Stephen Gostkowski kick), 4:35. Patriots 7–3. Drive 14 plays, 70 yards, 6:30.
- NE – Chris Hogan 53-yard pass from Tom Brady (Stephen Gostkowski kick), 1:41. Patriots 14–3. Drive: 3 plays, 45 yards, 2:08.

Second quarter

- BUF – Mike Gillislee 3-yard run (Dan Carpenter kick), 6:26. Patriots 14–10. Drive: 5 plays, 59 yards, 2:14.
- NE – Rob Gronkowski 53-yard pass from Tom Brady (Stephen Gostkowski kick), 4:18. Patriots 21–10. Drive: 4 plays, 79 yards, 2:08.
- NE – Stephen Gostkowski 51-yard field goal, 0:03. Patriots 24–10. Drive: 5 plays, 28 yards, 0:27.

Third quarter

- NE – Julian Edelman 12-yard pass from Tom Brady (Stephen Gostkowski kick), 14:00. Patriots 31–10. Drive: 2 plays, 24 yards, 1:00.
- BUF – Tyrod Taylor 26-yard run (Dan Carpenter kick), 7:57. Patriots 31–17. Drive: 13 plays, 75 yards, 6:03.
- NE – LeGarrette Blount 1-yard run (Stephen Gostkowski kick), 7:10. Patriots 38–17. Drive: 12 plays, 75 yards, 4:52.

Fourth quarter

- NE – Stephen Gostkowski 32-yard field goal, 7:10. Patriots 41–17. Drive: 13 plays, 76 yards, 4:52.
- BUF – Jonathan Williams 1-yard run (EJ Manuel–Nick O'Leary pass), 0:33. Patriots 41–25. Drive: 6 plays, 66 yards, 1:56.

Top passers

- NE – Tom Brady – 22/33, 315 yards, 4 TD
- BUF – Tyrod Taylor – 19/38, 183 yards

Top rushers

- NE – LeGarrette Blount – 18 rushes, 43 yards, TD
- BUF – Mike Gillislee – 12 rushes, 85 yards, TD

Top receivers

- NE – Rob Gronkowski – 5 receptions, 109 yards, TD
- BUF – Walt Powell – 3 receptions, 59 yards

In a rematch of their only loss so far this season, the Patriots faced the Buffalo Bills in a road game.

After taking the opening kick, the Bills raced 70 yards all the way to the Patriots 5, but the Patriots defense kept Buffalo out of the end zone, forcing them to kick a 23-yard field goal. On the ensuing kickoff, Walt Powell forced Matthew Slater to fumble, but Shea McClellin recovered for the Patriots at their own 30. The Patriots drained over half of the remainder of the first quarter, going 70 yards to score on a 9-yard touchdown pass from Brady to Amendola. After a Bills three-and-out, the Patriots were given good field at the Bills 45. An offensive pass interference penalty on Amendola moved the ball back to the Patriots 45, but a holding penalty on Robert Blanton of the Bills moved the ball to mid field. A two-yard run by Blount and incomplete pass brought up a 3rd-and-8 from the Bills 48, and Brady hit Edelman with a 47-yard bomb to the 1-yard line, but the gain was nullified on an ineligible man downfield penalty on Marcus Cannon moving the ball back to the Patriots 47. Then Brady hit Hogan on a 53-yard touchdown bomb, increasing the lead to 14–3. Four possessions later, the Bills raced 59 yards in just 5 plays, scoring on a Mike Gillislee 3-yard touchdown rush. After Amendola returned the ball 24 yards to the Patriots 21, the Patriots countered, using just four plays and Brady found Gronkowski on a 53-yard touchdown, increasing the lead to 21–10. The Bills raced 44 yards in 11 plays to the Patriots 31 on their ensuing possession, but Carpenter missed a 49-yard field goal after it hit the upright. Taking over at their own 39, a 6-yard pass to White, a 15-yard pass to Amendola, and a 7-yard pass to Edelman led the Patriot to Bills 33 and Gostkowski kicked a 51-yard field goal, giving the Patriots a 24–10 lead at halftime. Amendola kicked off the second half with fireworks, returning the kick 73 yards to the Bills 24. Two plays later, Brady hit Edelman for a 12-yard touchdown pass, extending the lead to 31–10. The Bills didn't quit, though, using a marathon 75-yard, six minute drive, concluding with Taylor splitting the defense for a 26-yard touchdown run, making it a game again with a 31–17 score. The Patriots countered right back, engineering an 11-play, 75-yard drive with LeGarrette Blount chalking up a 1-yard touchdown run, increasing the lead to 38-17 late in the third quarter. Using Reggie Bush 35-yard kick return, the Bills drove 50 yards to the Patriots 10 in just 4 plays, but on the first play of the fourth quarter, a Taylor pass bounced off the fingertips of Charles Clay and the Bills turned the ball over on downs. The Patriots put the game away on their next drive, marching 76-yards in 13 plays, taking 7:49 off the clock, with Gostkowski adding a 32-yard field goal, giving the Patriots a 41–17 lead with just 7:06 remaining in the game. The Bills drove 52 yards to the Patriots 32 on their next drive, but turned the ball over on downs when Robert Woods was tackled 1-yard short of the first down by Malcolm Butler. The Bills forced a Patriots punt and raced 66 yards in 6 plays, scoring a touchdown on a 1-yard touchdown run by Jonathan Williams with a two-point conversion on a two-yard pass from backup quarterback EJ Manuel to Nick O'Leary trimming the score to 41–25, but only 0:30 remained. After recovering the onside kick, the Patriots took a knee to win the game.

Brady was 22/33 for 315 yards and had four touchdown passes to four different receivers (Danny Amendola, Chris Hogan, Rob Gronkowski and Julian Edelman); LeGarrette Blount added a running touchdown and Stephen Gostkowski a field goal. Heading into their bye week, the Patriots improved to 7–1, the best record in the league.

=== Week 10: vs. Seattle Seahawks ===
Week Ten: Seattle Seahawks at New England Patriots – Game summary

Quarter	1	2	3	4	Total
Seahawks	6	13	3	9	31
Patriots	7	7	7	3	24

at Gillette Stadium, Foxborough, Massachusetts

- Date: November 13
- Game time: 8:30 p.m. EST
- Game weather: 43 °F (6 °C), clear and cool
- Game attendance: 66,829
- Referee: Gene Steratore
- TV announcers (NBC): Al Michaels, Cris Collinsworth and Michele Tafoya
- Recap, Gamebook

Game information

First quarter

- NE – LeGarrette Blount 1-yard run (Stephen Gostkowski kick), 10:19. Patriots 7–0. Drive: 9 plays, 75 yards, 4:41.
- SEA – Steven Hauschka 27-yard field goal, 7:10. Patriots 7–3. Drive: 8 plays, 52 yards, 3:09.
- SEA – Steven Hauschka 31-yard field goal, 1:33. Patriots 7–6. Drive: 10 plays, 66 yards, 4:13.

Second quarter

- SEA – Doug Baldwin 6-yard pass from Russell Wilson (kick blocked), 10:52. Seahawks 12–7. Drive: 10 plays, 65 yards, 4:10.
- NE – LeGarrette Blount 1-yard run (Stephen Gostkowski kick), 1:05. Patriots 14–12. Drive: 11 plays, 81 yards, 4:59.
- SEA – Doug Baldwin 18-yard pass from Russell Wilson (Steven Hauschka kick), 0:06. Seahawks 19–14. Drive: 7 plays, 75, 0:50.

Third quarter

- NE – LeGarrette Blount 13-yard run (Stephen Gostkowski kick), 7:52. Patriots 21–19. Drive: 10 plays, 91 yards, 5:34.
- SEA – Steven Hauschka 41-yard field goal, 2:52. Seahawks 22–21. Drive: 9 plays, 52 yards, 5:00.

Fourth quarter

- NE – Stephen Gostkowski 30-yard field goal, 13:00. Patriots 24–22. Drive: 10 plays, 63 yards, 4:52.
- SEA – Steven Hauschka 23-yard field goal, 8:56. Seahawks 25–24. Drive: 8 plays, 58 yards, 4:04.
- SEA – Doug Baldwin 15-yard pass from Russell Wilson (pass failed), 4:24. Seahawks 31–24. Drive: 8 plays, 48 yards, 4:05.

Top passers

- SEA – Russell Wilson – 25/37, 348 yards, 3 TD
- NE – Tom Brady – 23/32, 316 yards, INT

Top rushers

- SEA – C. J. Prosise – 17 rushes, 66 yards
- NE – LeGarrette Blount – 21 rushes, 69 yards, 3 TD

Top receivers

- SEA – C. J. Prosise – 7 receptions, 87 yards
- NE – Martellus Bennett – 7 receptions, 102 yards

Coming off of their Week 9 bye, the Patriots hosted the Seattle Seahawks on Sunday Night Football in a rematch of Super Bowl XLIX. This was also New England's first home game against Seattle since 2004.

The Patriots marched 75 yards in 9 plays on their first drive of the game, with LeGarrette Blount scoring on a 1-yard touchdown run. Placekicker Stephen Gostkowski's kick went out of bounds, giving Seattle the ball at their own 40. The Seahawks reached the Patriots 8-yard line, but the Patriots red zone defense held them to a 26-yard field goal by placekicker Steven Hauschka and the score was 7–3. After a Patriots three-and-out, the Seahawks drove 66 yards in 10 plays, reaching the Patriots 13, but once again the Patriots kept them out of the end zone, and Hauschka kicked a 31-yard field goal, trimming the deficit to 7–6. After another Patriots three-and-out, the Seahawks 65 yards in 10 plays, this time reaching the end zone on quarterback Russell Wilson's 6-yard touchdown pass to wide receiver Doug Baldwin, but the PAT was blocked, keeping the score 12–7. On the second play of the Patriots next drive, Gronkowski seemed to fumble after being hit hard by safety Earl Thomas, but replay overturned it. Two plays later, cornerback DeShawn Shead intercepted quarterback Tom Brady at the Seattle 22 and returned it 2 yards to the Seahawks 24. The Patriots forced Seattle to punt, then marched 81 yards in 11 plays, scoring on Blount's 1-yard touchdown run with 1:05 remaining in the first half. However, 1:05 was too much time for Seattle as they raced 75 yards in under a minute, with Wilson finding Baldwin wide open in the end zone for an 18-yard touchdown, giving Seattle a 19–14 lead at halftime. After a Seahawks three-and-out, the Patriots had their way with Seattle on 10 play, 91-yard drive, scoring on Blount's 13-yard touchdown run, re-taking the lead, 21–19. Seattle countered with a long drive of their own, advancing 52 yards in 9 plays, taking a 22–21 lead on Hauschka's 41-yard field goal. The Patriots countered Seattle's field goal with one of their own, marching 63 yards in 10 plays, reaching the Seattle, but the Seahawks clamped down, and drove the Patriots back to the 12 and forced them to settle for Gostkowski's 30-yard field goal, retaking the lead 24–22. Seattle countered as well, racing 58 yards in 8 plays, reaching the New England 5, but the Patriots red zone defense once more kept them out of the end zone, and Hauschka was good from 23 yards away, his fourth, retaking the lead for Seattle, 25–24. Kickoff returner Cyrus Jones fumbled the kick return, but safety Nate Ebner recovered, but two plays later, after a 5-yard gain, safety Kam Chancellor forced wide receiver Julian Edelman to fumble, with Richard Sherman returning the ball 14-yards to the Patriots 48. Eight plays later, Wilson capped off the 48-yard drive with his touchdown pass to Baldwin, with a failed two point conversion, keeping the Patriots in the game 31–24. Facing a 3rd-and-10 at their own 46, Brady hit Edelman on a 30-yard bomb to the Seahawks 24. After a 4-yard loss by Blount, Brady hit Gronkowski on a 26-yard bomb to the Seahawks 2. Very close to the end zone, Brady gained 1-yard on the sneak attempt. But on the very next play, Blount was stuffed for no gain, bringing up 3rd-and-Goal at the 1. Brady tried to sneak again, but fumbled and recovered at the Seahawks 2. On 4th-and-Goal Gronkowski couldn't catch a pass from Brady and the Patriots turned it over on downs. The Seahawks ran out the final seconds and won the game.

The Patriots dropped to a record of 7–2, but still maintained first place in the AFC East. This was their last loss of the season. The Seahawks improved to a record of 6–2–1.

This was the final Patriots game to air on then-NBC affiliate WHDH-TV in Boston, as the station would become independent in 2017.

=== Week 11: at San Francisco 49ers ===
Week Eleven: New England Patriots at San Francisco 49ers – Game summary

Quarter	1	2	3	4	Total
Patriots	6	7	0	17	30
49ers	3	7	0	7	17

at Levi's Stadium, Santa Clara, California

- Date: November 20
- Game time: 4:25 p.m. EST/1:25 p.m. PST
- Game weather: 64 °F (18 °C), cloudy with rain and fog
- Game attendance: 70,178
- Referee: Jeff Triplette
- TV announcers (CBS): Greg Gumbel, Trent Green and Jamie Erdahl
- Recap, Gamebook

Game information

First quarter

- NE – Julian Edelman 4-yard pass from Tom Brady (kick failed, wide right), 10:10. Patriots 6–0. Drive: 6 plays, 27 yards, 2:53.
- SF – Phil Dawson 33-yard field goal, 2:40. Patriots 6–3. Drive: 12 plays, 60 yards, 7:30.

Second quarter

- NE – James White 9-yard pass from Tom Brady (Stephen Gostkowski kick), 14:53. Patriots 13–3. Drive: 6 plays, 77 yards, 2:47.
- SF – Vance McDonald 18-yard pass from Colin Kaepernick (Phil Dawson kick), 4:56. Patriots 13–10. Drive: 8 plays, 92 yards, 4:17.

Third quarter

- No scoring plays.

Fourth quarter

- NE – Danny Amendola 5-yard pass from Tom Brady (Stephen Gostkowski kick), 14:55. Patriots 20–10. Drive: 10 plays, 80 yards, 4:21.
- NE – Malcolm Mitchell 56-yard pass from Tom Brady (Stephen Gostkowski kick), 10:06. Patriots 27–10. Drive: 5 plays, 70 yards, 1:55.
- NE – Stephen Gostkowski 38-yard field goal, 6:11. Patriots 30–10. Drive: 8 plays, 50 yards, 3:04.
- SF – Shaun Draughn 13-yard pass from Colin Kaepernick (Phil Dawson kick), 2:06. Patriots 30–17. Drive: 12 plays, 75 yards, 4:05.

Top passers

- NE – Tom Brady – 24/40, 280 yards, 4 TD
- SF – Colin Kaepernick – 16/30, 206 yards, 2 TD

Top rushers

- NE – LeGarrette Blount – 19 rushes, 125 yards
- SF – Carlos Hyde – 19 rushes, 86 yards

Top receivers

- NE – Malcolm Mitchell – 4 receptions, 98 yards, TD
- SF – Vance McDonald – 3 receptions, 46 yards, TD

After a disappointing loss to Seattle the Patriots traveled to Santa Clara, California to face Tom Brady's childhood team, the San Francisco 49ers, who were on an eight-game losing streak. This was also the first time Brady played the 49ers in San Francisco, as he missed the Patriots' trip to Candlestick Park in 2008 as a result of an injury.

After a 49ers three-and-out, Amendola returned the punt 30 yards to the 49ers 27. Six plays later, Brady hit Edelman on a 7-yard touchdown pass, but Gostkowski missed the extra point. The 49ers drove all the way to the Patriots 6 on their next drive, but Hightower sacked Colin Kaepernick for a 9-yard loss on 3rd-down and they were forced to settle for a 33-yard field goal by Phil Dawson. The Patriots countered on their next drive, racing 77 yards in just 6 plays, scoring on Brady's 9-yard touchdown pass to James White, increasing the lead to 13–3. Two possessions later, the 49ers raced 92 yards in just over four minutes, scoring on an 18-yard touchdown catch by Vance McDonald, trimming the deficit to 13–10. After both teams punted, the Patriots drove to the 49ers 41, but White couldn't get out of bounds in time after a 25-yard catch, and the Patriots led 13–10 at halftime. After the first four possessions of the second half ended in punts, the Patriots marched 80 yards in 10 plays, scoring on Brady's 5-yard connection to Amendola, increasing the lead to 20–10. Three possessions later, Brady found Mitchell for a 56-yard touchdown pass as Brady was falling down, capping off a 70-yard drive, upping the lead to 27–10. After a 49ers three-and-out, the Patriots kept pouring it on, driving all the way to the 49ers 20, and Gostkowski added a 38-yard field goal, widening the lead to 30–10. The Niners marched 75 yards on their next drive, scoring on Kaepernick's 13-yard touchdown pass to Shaun Draughn, trimming the deficit to 30–17. Amendola recovered the ensuing onside kick and the Patriots ran out the rest of the clock to end the game.

The Patriots improved to 8–2. Running back LeGarrette Blount had a big day as he rushed for a total of 125 yards on 19 carries. In addition, Tom Brady also had a big day passing for a total of 4 touchdowns against the 49ers. This was also Brady's 199th career win (regular season and postseason combined), tied with Brett Favre for second place.

=== Week 12: at New York Jets ===
Week Twelve: New England Patriots at New York Jets – Game summary

Quarter	1	2	3	4	Total
Patriots	0	10	3	9	22
Jets	3	7	0	7	17

at MetLife Stadium, East Rutherford, New Jersey

- Date: November 27
- Game time: 4:25 p.m. EST
- Game weather: 45 °F (7 °C), partly cloudy
- Game attendance: 78,160
- Referee: Brad Allen
- TV announcers (CBS): Greg Gumbel, Trent Green and Jamie Erdahl
- Recap, Gamebook

Game information

First quarter

- NYJ – Nick Folk 51-yard field goal, 10:29. Jets 3–0. Drive: 8 plays, 41 yards, 3:14.

Second quarter

- NYJ – Brandon Marshall 1-yard pass from Ryan Fitzpatrick (Nick Folk kick), 14:56. Jets 10–0. Drive: 9 plays, 79 yards, 4:46.
- NE – Stephen Gostkowski 28-yard field goal, 10:45. Jets 10–3. Drive: 10 plays, 65 yards, 4:11.
- NE – Malcolm Mitchell 4-yard pass from Tom Brady (Stephen Gostkowski kick), 6:29. Tied 10–10. Drive: 7 plays, 50 yards, 3:17.

Third quarter

- NE – Stephen Gostkowski 29-yard field goal, 7:34. Patriots 13–10. Drive: 12 plays, 58 yard, 5:21.

Fourth quarter

- NYJ – Quincy Enunwa 22-yard pass from Ryan Fitzpatrick (Nick Folk kick), 10:11. Jets 17–13. Drive: 8 plays, 73 yards, 4:32.
- NE – Stephen Gostkowski 41-yard field goal, 7:02. Jets 17–16. Drive: 8 plays, 53 yards, 3:15.
- NE – Malcolm Mitchell 8-yard pass from Tom Brady (pass failed), 1:56. Patriots 22–17. Drive: 9 plays, 83 yards, 3:08.

Top passers

- NE – Tom Brady – 30/50, 286 yards, 2 TD
- NYJ – Ryan Fitzpatrick – 22/32, 269 yards, 2 TD

Top rushers

- NE – LeGarrette Blount – 11 rushes, 67 yards
- NYJ – Bilal Powell – 8 rushes, 36 yards

Top receivers

- NE – Julian Edelman – 8 receptions, 83 yards
- NYJ – Quincy Enunwa – 5 receptions, 109 yards, TD

After forcing a three-and-out, the Jets marched 41 yards to the Patriots 33, finishing the drive with a 51-yard field goal by Nick Folk. On the Patriots third possession of the game, Gronkowski came to the sideline injured. He went to the locker room and didn't play another game that season. Later in the first quarter, the Jets marched 79 yards, converting a 3rd-and-9, with Ryan Fitzpatrick finding Brandon Marshall for a 1-yard touchdown pass on the first play of the second quarter, increasing the lead to 10–0. The Patriots responded on their next drive, reaching the Jets 8, but after a 2-yard sack and an incompletion, Gostkowski kicked a 28-yard field goal, trimming the deficit to 10–3. On the second play of the Jets ensuing possession, Fitzpatrick connected with Robby Anderson for a 25-yard gain, but Anderson was stripped by Malcolm Butler, who recovered at midfield. The Patriots drove 50 yards, only facing one third-down, and scored on a 4-yard touchdown catch by Malcolm Mitchell. The Jets drove to the Patriots 36 on their next drive, but Folk missed a 54-yard field goal attempt. With great field position at their own 46, the Patriots drove 33 yards to the Jets 21, but Gostkowski missed a 39-yarder, sending the game to halftime tied 10-10. After a Jets three-and-out, the Patriots marched all the way to the Jets 11, but the Jets clamped down and forced a 29-yard field goal by Gostkowski, giving the Patriots their first lead, 13–10. After swapping punts, the Jets covered 73 yards, not facing a single third down, regaining the lead with Fitzpatrick throwing a 22-yard pass to Quincy Enunwa with 10:17 remaining in the fourth quarter. Down 17–13, the Patriots advanced to the Jets 22, but decided to kick a 40-yard field goal, trimming the deficit to 17–16. The Jets reached their own 27, but an intentional grounding penalty pushed them back, and they punted two plays later. A holding penalty on McCourty negated Amendola's 15-yard return which would have set the Patriots up at their own 42. Starting at their own 17, Brady led a clutch, 9 play, 83-yard drive. Facing a 4th-and-4 at the Jets 37, Brady completed three consecutive passes: a 4-yard completion to White, a 25-yard completion to Hogan, and then an 8-yard touchdown pass to Mitchell, with a missed two-point conversion, giving the Patriots a 22–17 lead with just 1:56 remaining. After a five-yard completion to Jalin Marshall, Fitzpatrick was strip-sacked by Long with Trey Flowers recovering at the Jets 34. A 3-yard run by Blount on 3rd-and-2 sealed the win for the Patriots.

With the win, the Patriots improved to 9–2 and clinched their 16th consecutive winning season. This was also the Patriots' 500th franchise win, as well as Tom Brady's 200th career win, tying him with Peyton Manning and surpassing Brett Favre, who had 199 wins. In addition to this, Tom Brady also surpassed the 60,000-yard career passing mark.

=== Week 13: vs. Los Angeles Rams ===
Week Thirteen: Los Angeles Rams at New England Patriots – Game summary

Quarter	1	2	3	4	Total
Rams	0	0	3	7	10
Patriots	7	10	6	3	26

at Gillette Stadium, Foxborough, Massachusetts

- Date: December 4
- Game time: 1:00 p.m. EST
- Game weather: 39 °F (4 °C), sunny and cool
- Game attendance: 66,829
- Referee: Jerome Boger
- TV announcers (Fox): Kevin Burkhardt, John Lynch and Pam Oliver
- Recap, Gamebook

Game information

First quarter

- NE – LeGarrette Blount 43-yard run (Stephen Gostkowski kick), 10:38. Patriots 7–0. Drive: 8 plays, 80 yards, 4:22.

Second quarter

- NE – Chris Hogan 14-yard pass from Tom Brady (Stephen Gostkowski kick), 13:04. Patriots 14–0. Drive: 4 plays, 30 yards, 1:56.
- NE – Stephen Gostkowski 28-yard field goal, 0:11. Patriots 17–0. Drive: 13 plays, 48 yards, 5:19.

Third quarter

- LA – Greg Zuerlein 44-yard field goal, 7:50. Patriots 17–3. Drive: 8 plays, 29 yards, 4:55.
- NE – Stephen Gostkowski 44-yard field goal, 5:08. Patriots 20–3. Drive: 6 plays, 49 yards, 2:42.
- NE – Stephen Gostkowski 48-yard field goal, 3:06. Patriots 23–3. Drive: 6 plays, 13 yards, 1:56.

Fourth quarter

- NE – Stephen Gostkowski 45-yard field goal, 10:48. Patriots 26–3. Drive: 10 plays, 58 yards, 4:26.
- LA – Kenny Britt 1-yard pass from Jared Goff (Greg Zuerlein kick), 1:15. Patriots 26–10. Drive: 6 plays, 66 yards, 2:14.

Top passers

- LA – Jared Goff – 14/32, 161 yards, TD, 2 INT
- NE – Tom Brady – 33/46, 269 yards, TD

Top rushers

- LA – Todd Gurley – 11 rushes, 39 yards
- NE – LeGarrette Blount – 18 rushes, 88 yards, TD

Top receivers

- LA – Kenny Britt – 2 receptions, 67 yards, TD
- NE – Julian Edelman – 8 receptions, 101 yards

Tom Brady was making his 231st career start, tying John Elway for the 5th-most all-time.

The Patriots marched 80 yards right down the field on their opening possession, scoring on a 43-yard burst by Blount. The next four possessions of the game were punts, but Butler intercepted Jared Goff on the last play of the first quarter and returned it 7 yards to the Rams 30. It only took four plays from Brady to find Chris Hogan on a 14-yard touchdown pass, increasing the Patriots lead to 14–0. After the next three drives ended in punts, the Patriots marched 48 yards to the Rams 10, but as a sign of the Patriots soon-to-come red zone struggles, Stephen Gostkowski kicked a field goal with 0:11 remaining in the first half. The Rams took a knee and the Patriots led 17–0 at halftime. The first two possessions of the second half were punts, but the Rams finally got on board late in the 3rd quarter. After Pharoh Cooper returned a punt 6 yards to the Rams 45, the Rams drove to the Patriots 26-yard line and Greg Zuerlein got the Rams on the scoreboard with a 44-yard field goal. The Patriots countered by driving to the Rams 30 with Gostkowski adding a 48-yard field goal, increasing the lead to 20–3. Kyle Van Noy intercepted Goff on the first play of the Rams next possession. The Patriots only managed to reach the Rams 27, but Gostkowski added a 44-yard field goal. Down 23–3, the Rams were still unable to move the ball and punted. Once again the Patriots drove to the Rams 27 and another 45-yard Gostkowski field goal increased the Patriots lead to 26–3. a few plays into the fourth quarter. Late in the game, Goff hit Kenny Britt for a 66-yard gain to the Patriots 1-yard line. Four plays later, they connected again on a 1-yard touchdown pass, trimming the score to 26–10, but only 1:15 remained. The Patriots recovered the Rams onside kick attempt and ran out the clock to end the game.

With the win, the Patriots improved to 10–2, clinching their 14th consecutive 10-win season and finishing 3-1 against the NFC West. The defense dominated, holding the Rams to a paltry 162 yards and just 10 points while forcing two turnovers. Additionally, Tom Brady won his 201st career game, surpassing Peyton Manning for the most combined regular season and postseason victories by a quarterback in NFL history.

=== Week 14: vs. Baltimore Ravens ===
Week Fourteen: Baltimore Ravens at New England Patriots – Game summary

Quarter	1	2	3	4	Total
Ravens	0	3	14	6	23
Patriots	9	7	7	7	30

at Gillette Stadium, Foxborough, Massachusetts

- Date: December 12
- Game time: 8:30 p.m. EST
- Game weather: 31 °F (−1 °C), clear
- Game attendance: 66,829
- Referee: Ed Hochuli
- TV announcers (ESPN): Sean McDonough, Jon Gruden and Lisa Salters
- Recap, Gamebook

Game information

First quarter

- NE – Kenneth Dixon tackled in the end zone by Malcom Brown and Patrick Chung for a safety, 10:47. Patriots 2–0. Drive: 1 play, −1 yards, 0:06.
- NE – LeGarrette Blount 1-yard run (Stephen Gostkowski kick), 1:04. Patriots 9–0. Drive: 10 plays, 74 yards, 4:47.

Second quarter

- NE – Malcolm Mitchell 6-yard pass from Tom Brady (Stephen Gostkowski kick), 9:28. Patriots 16–0. Drive: 8 plays, 89 yards, 3:27.
- BAL – Justin Tucker 50-yard field goal, 0:11. Patriots 16–3. Drive: 5 plays, 20 yards, 0:49.

Third quarter

- NE – Martellus Bennett 19-yard pass from Tom Brady (Stephen Gostkowski kick), 8:45. Patriots 23–3. Drive: 7 plays, 65 yards, 3:56.
- BAL – Darren Waller 3-yard pass from Joe Flacco (Justin Tucker kick), 6:50. Patriots 23–10. Drive: 2 plays, 3 yards, 0:07.
- BAL – Kenneth Dixon 8-yard pass from Joe Flacco (Justin Tucker kick), 5:24. Patriots 23–17. Drive: 4 plays, 22 yards, 1:19.

Fourth quarter

- BAL – Justin Tucker 38-yard field goal, 6:35. Patriots 23–20. Drive: 9 plays, 56 yards, 6:20.
- NE – Chris Hogan 79-yard pass from Tom Brady (Stephen Gostkowski kick), 6:18. Patriots 30–20. Drive: 1 play, 79 yards, 0:17.
- BAL – Justin Tucker 37-yard field goal, 2:03. Patriots 30–23. Drive: 10 plays, 61 yards, 4:15.

Top passers

- BAL – Joe Flacco – 37/52, 324 yards, 2 TD, INT
- NE – Tom Brady – 25/38, 406 yards, 3 TD, INT

Top rushers

- BAL – Kenneth Dixon – 11 rushes, 39 yards,
- NE – LeGarrette Blount – 18 rushes, 72 yards, TD

Top receivers

- BAL – Steve Smith Sr. – 4 receptions, 57 yards
- NE – Chris Hogan – 5 receptions, 129 yards, TD

The defenses dominated the first three drives of the game, all ending in punts. But midway through the first quarter, Malcom Brown and Patrick Chung shared a tackle of Kenneth Dixon in the end zone for a safety(the third by the Patriots' defense on the season). The Ravens forced the Patriots to punt, and, aided by a 40-yard gain from Joe Flacco to Kyle Juszczyk and a 15-yard pass interference penalty on Cyrus Jones, drove all the way to the Patriots 16, but Shea McClellin blocked Justin Tucker's field goal attempt. Following that, the Patriots covering 74 yards in 10 plays, scoring on a 1-yard touchdown run by Blount, his 14th, which tied him with Curtis Martin who had 14 for the 1995 New England Patriots. The Ravens reached Patriot territory on their following possession, too, but punted again. Aided by a 61-yard completion to White, the Patriots raced 89 yards in just eight plays with Brady finding Mitchell on a 6-yard touchdown pass, extending the lead to 16–0. On the second plays of the Ravens next drive, McCourty intercepted Flacco at the Patriots 22 and returned it 40 yards to the Ravens 38, but official review ruled him down by contact at the Patriots 23. Despite this, the Patriots reached the Ravens 1-yard line, but Eric Weddle intercepted Brady (only his second interception of the season) and returned it 14 yards to the Ravens 10. Two possessions later, after Devin Hester returned a punt 12 yards to the Ravens 28, the Ravens reached the Patriots 28 and got on board with a 50-yard Tucker field goal with 0:11 seconds left in the half, making the score 16–3 at halftime. After forcing the Ravens to punt on the initial drive of the third quarter, the Patriots marched 65 yards to score on Brady's 19-yard pass to Bennett, increasing the lead to 23–3. A 6-yard run by Blount on the drive game him 1,005 yards for the season. However, the Ravens got back in the game with aide from the Patriots. While the Ravens offense continued its ineptitude, Cyrus Jones muffed a punt with Chris Moore recovering at the Patriots 3. Two plays later, Flacco connected with Darren Waller for a two-yard touchdown pass, trimming the deficit to 23–10. Things got better for the Ravens with Matthew Slater fumbling the kick return and Shareece Wright recovering at the Patriots 22-yard line. Four plays later, Dixon caught a swing pass for an 8-yard touchdown, and all of a sudden the score was 23–17. After three consecutive punts, the Ravens, aided by a 47-yard catch by Breshad Perriman, reached the Patriots 12, but on 3rd-and-4 Flacco was sacked by Ninkovich for an 8-yard loss. Tucker finished the drive with a 38-yard field goal, trimming the deficit to 23–20 with 6:35 remaining in the game. On the first play of the Patriots next drive, Brady found Chris Hogan wide open for a 79-yard touchdown, extending the Patriots lead to 30–20. That was Brady's 450th career touchdown pass and only Hogan's second career 100-yard receiving game. Yet, the Ravens were still in the game, driving to the Patriots 20-yard line, Tucker hit a 37-yard field goal, trimming the deficit to 30–23 and giving the Ravens a chance. On the Patriots next drive, the Ravens brought the game to a 4th-and-1 with 0:13 remaining. Instead of punting, the Patriots went for the kill shot and got it with Blount's 3-yard run enabling the Patriots to run out the clock and end the game.

The Patriots improved to 11–2 (4-0 against the AFC North) and dropped 496 yards of total offense and 30 points on the Ravens' top-ranked defense, both the most allowed in the season by the Ravens. The Patriots posted their 10th all-time franchise victory against the Ravens. This was Brady's 100th career home win and his 9th 400+ yard passing game of his career and his second of the season. As of 2025, this remains the last time the Patriots had swept the AFC North.

=== Week 15: at Denver Broncos ===
Week Fifteen: New England Patriots at Denver Broncos – Game summary

Quarter	1	2	3	4	Total
Patriots	3	7	3	3	16
Broncos	3	0	0	0	3

at Sports Authority Field at Mile High, Denver, Colorado

- Date: December 18
- Game time: 4:25 p.m. EST/2:25 p.m. MST
- Game weather: 18 °F (−8 °C), sunny
- Game attendance: 76,893
- Referee: Walt Anderson
- TV announcers (CBS): Jim Nantz, Phil Simms and Tracy Wolfson
- Recap, Gamebook

Game information

First quarter

- NE – Stephen Gostkowski 45-yard field goal, 12:32. Patriots 3–0. Drive: 4 plays, 4 yards, 0:49.
- DEN – Brandon McManus 33-yard field goal, 7:02. Tied 3-3. Drive: 8 plays, 47 yards, 2:55.

Second quarter

- NE – LeGarrette Blount 1-yard run (Stephen Gostkowski kick), 11:01. Patriots 10–3. Drive: 7 plays, 46 yards, 3:49.

Third quarter

- NE – Stephen Gostkowski 40-yard field goal, 5:32. Patriots 13–3. Drive: 11 plays, 61 yards, 5:12.

Fourth quarter

- NE – Stephen Gostkowski 21-yard field goal, 8:19. Patriots 16–3. Drive: 6 plays, 50 yards, 2:40.

Top passers

- NE – Tom Brady – 16/32, 188 yards
- DEN – Trevor Siemian – 25/40, 283 yards, INT

Top rushers

- NE – Dion Lewis – 18 rushes, 95 yards
- DEN – Justin Forsett – 10 rushes, 37 yards

Top receivers

- NE – Julian Edelman – 6 receptions, 75 yards
- DEN – Demaryius Thomas – 7 receptions, 91 yards

The Patriots faced the Denver Broncos in a rematch of the previous season's AFC Championship game. The Broncos won the coin toss and elected to kick. Beginning at their own 24, the Patriots went were unable to get a first down causing them to punt. Unluckily for the Broncos, during Ryan Allen's punt Jordan Norwood muffed the punt and the Patriots obtained it with a Jonathan Jones recovery. The Patriots began at the Denver 31. Unfortunately for the Patriots, they were unable to get a first down and were forced to settle with a Stephen Gostkowski 45-yard field goal for 3 points. The Broncos began the ball on their own 25 on the next possession. They started off well with a 13-yard run by Justin Forsett. However, they were unable to get a first down. On the Patriots next drive, they began at their own 15. On the beginning of the first play, an illegal formation was called on the Patriots forcing them to move back 5-yards. Once again, they went three and out unable to acquire a first down. The Patriots punted and the Broncos began at their own 38. This time, they managed to get a field goal with Brandon McManus's 33-yard kick. They traveled 47-yards in 8 plays and 2:55. The next Patriots drive again ended in a punt but this time traveling 31 yards on 6 plays. The Broncos received the punt at their own 7. This time, they managed to get to the Patriot's red zone nearly getting into the end zone. Nonetheless, Trevor Siemian was intercepted by Logan Ryan on a pass intended for Emmanuel Sanders. Ryan ran the ball back all the way to the Denver' 46. This was the first play of the second quarter. This time the Patriots managed to get a touchdown in spite of the fact that they had to face a 1st & 20. The first play of the drive ending in a Tom Brady fumble in which Patriot offensive lineman Joe Thuney recovered. The Patriots reached the Broncos' 1 and scored a touchdown with LeGarrette Blount's 1-yard run. The next 2 drives of both teams ended in punts. The Broncos received the ball once more and ended the first half with a run play. The Broncos began with first possession in the beginning of the second half. On their first drive, they went three and out having to punt. Similarly, the Patriots also went three and out. On the next Broncos' possession once again, they were unable to get a first down. The Patriots managed to score on their next drive with Gostkowski's 40-yard field goal. They went 11 plays for 61 yards in 5:12. The next 5 incoming drives all ended in punts. The next three points came on another Gostkowski 21-yard field goal. The next two drives ended in downs. McCourty stripped Jordan Norwood with a few seconds left to seal the win.

Despite just sixteen completions for 188 yards Brady defeated the Broncos for only the third time at Denver and seventh time in his career With the win, the Patriots improved to 12–2, and they clinched a first round bye for the playoffs and the AFC East title for the eighth straight season. Their eighth straight division title surpassed the Rams franchise from 1973 to 1979 for the most consecutive division titles won by one team in NFL history.

=== Week 16: vs. New York Jets ===
Week Sixteen: New York Jets at New England Patriots – Game summary

Quarter	1	2	3	4	Total
Jets	0	0	0	3	3
Patriots	10	17	7	7	41

at Gillette Stadium, Foxborough, Massachusetts

- Date: December 24
- Game time: 1:00 p.m. EST
- Game weather: 40 °F (4 °C), rain
- Game attendance: 66,289
- Referee: Gene Steratore
- TV announcers (CBS): Ian Eagle, Dan Fouts and Evan Washburn
- Recap, Gamebook

Game information

First quarter

- NE – Stephen Gostkowski 29-yard field goal, 8:16. Patriots 3–0. Drive: 9 plays, 42 yards, 4:31.
- NE – Martellus Bennett 8-yard pass from Tom Brady (Stephen Gostkowski kick), 3:02. Patriots 10–0. Drive: 8 plays, 47 yards, 4:17.

Second quarter

- NE – Stephen Gostkowski 22-yard field goal, 11:13. Patriots 13–0. Drive: 8 plays, 24 yards, 2:42.
- NE – Matt Lengel 18-yard pass from Tom Brady (Stephen Gostkowski kick), 2:40. Patriots 20–0. Drive: 4 plays, 54 yards, 2:07.
- NE – James White 25-yard pass from Tom Brady (Stephen Gostkowski kick), 0:25. Patriots 27–0. Drive: 4 plays, 87 yards, 1:05.

Third quarter

- NE – LeGarrette Blount 1-yard run (Stephen Gostkowski kick), 3:22. Patriots 34–0. Drive: 13 plays, 63 yards, 7:40.

Fourth quarter

- NE – LeGarrette Blount 1-yard run (Stephen Gostkowski kick), 12:24. Patriots 41–0. Drive: 8 plays, 22 yards, 3:03.
- NYJ – Nick Folk 29-yard field goal, 6:16. Patriots 41–3. Drive: 13 plays, 64 yards, 6:08.

Top passers

- NYJ – Ryan Fitzpatrick – 8/21, 136 yards, 2 INT
- NE – Tom Brady – 17/27, 214 yards, 3 TD

Top rushers

- NYJ – Bilal Powell – 15 rushes, 60 yards
- NE – Dion Lewis – 16 rushes, 52 yards

Top receivers

- NYJ – Quincy Enunwa – 1 reception, 30 yards
- NE – Julian Edelman – 5 reception, 89 yards

The Patriots dominated the game from start to finish as they blew out the Jets 41–3 to move to a 13–2 record. The game began with a coin toss in which the Pats won and elected to kick. After forcing the Jets to punt on the first drive of the game, the Patriots used good field position to reach the Jets' 11 and Gostkowski gave the Patriots the early lead with a 29-yard field goal. On 3rd-and-11 on the Jets next drive, Bryce Petty was intercepted by Malcolm Butler at the Jets' 47 for no gain. The Patriots wasted no time, needing just 8 plays to score on a 5-yard touchdown pass from Brady to Bennett, extending the lead to 10–0. After both teams punted on their next possession, Khiry Robinson lost a fumble while being tackled by Elandon Roberts and Butler recovered for the Patriots. Petty was suffered a dislocated shoulder injury on the play and didn't return, being replaced by embattled veteran, Ryan Fitzpatrick. Taking over at the Jets' 28, outstanding field position, the Patriots drove all the way to the Jets 4, but could only settle for a field goal. The Jets finally moved the ball on their ensuing possession, but Nick Folk missed a 34-yard field goal wide right. Following a Patriots three-and-out, Fitzpatrick was intercepted by Eric Rowe at the Patriots' 46 for no gain. It took the Patriots a mere four plays to score on Brady's 18-yard touchdown pass to third-string tight end Matt Lengel, his first career catch, and the lead widened to 20–0. As the Jets anemic offense punted, a 47-yard pass interference penalty on Doug Middleton moved the ball from the Patriots' 28 to the Jets' 25 and on the next play, Brady threw a touchdown pass to James White with just 0:25 seconds left in the half to increase the margin to 27–0. The pass was just out of the reach of linebacker David Harris, who was covering him. After the first two drives of the second half ended in punts, the Patriots marched 63 yards in 13, lasting nearly 8 minutes to further their lead to 34–0 on a 1-yard touchdown run by Blount. On the 5th play of the Jets next drive, Fitzpatrick was intercepted by Butler, his second, who returned the ball 21 yards to the Jets 47, plus a face mask penalty moving the ball to the Jets' 22. With Garoppolo replacing Brady, the Patriots continued rolling 8 plays later with another 1-yard touchdown run by Blount early in the fourth quarter. With that touchdown (his 17th of the season) the lead increased to 41–0. On their next drive, the Jets finally ended the shutout attempt with Folk's 29-yard field goal. After a Patriots punt, the Jets once again drove into Patriots territory, but turned the ball over on downs. The Patriots proceeded to run out the clock to end the game.

The Patriots improved to 4-1 against the AFC East and they finished 6-2 at home, as their defense shut down Fitzpatrick, who had had a career day against the Patriots just four weeks earlier. The Patriots forced four turnovers from the Jets, including three interceptions; one being made by Eric Rowe and another two which were made by Malcolm Butler, who also recovered a fumble. Furthermore, head coach Bill Belichick recorded his 200th regular season victory with the Patriots; he became the fifth coach in NFL history to accomplish this feat with a single franchise.

=== Week 17: at Miami Dolphins ===
Week Seventeen: New England Patriots at Miami Dolphins – Game summary

Quarter	1	2	3	4	Total
Patriots	14	6	7	8	35
Dolphins	0	7	7	0	14

at Hard Rock Stadium, Miami Gardens, Florida

- Date: January 1, 2017
- Game time: 1:00 p.m. EST
- Game weather: 80 °F (27 °C), clear
- Game attendance: 66,163
- Referee: John Parry
- TV announcers (CBS): Ian Eagle, Dan Fouts and Evan Washburn
- Recap, Gamebook

Game information

First quarter

- NE – Martellus Bennett 2-yard pass from Tom Brady (Stephen Gostkowski kick), 7:28. Patriots 7–0. Drive: 13 plays, 75 yards, 7:32.
- NE – Michael Floyd 14-yard pass from Tom Brady (Stephen Gostkowski kick), 3:44. Patriots 14–0. Drive: 5 plays, 45 yards, 1:59.

Second quarter

- NE – Stephen Gostkowski 40-yard field goal, 14:56. Patriots 17–0. Drive: 8 plays, 34 yards, 2:58.
- NE – Stephen Gostkowski 26-yard field goal, 3:21. Patriots 20–0. Drive: 15 plays, 52 yards, 8:19.
- MIA – Jarvis Landry 8-yard pass from Matt Moore (Andrew Franks kick), 0:28. Patriots 20–7. Drive: 10 plays, 75 yards, 2:53.

Third quarter

- MIA – Kenny Stills 25-yard pass from Matt Moore (Andrew Franks kick), 8:39. Patriots 20–14. Drive: 12 plays, 75 yards, 6:21.
- NE – Julian Edelman 77-yard pass from Tom Brady (Stephen Gostkowski kick), 6:41. Patriots 27–14. Drive: 3 plays, 80 yards, 1:58.

Fourth quarter

- NE – LeGarrette Blount 1–yard run (Tom Brady–Julian Edelman pass), 5:33. Patriots 35–14. Drive: 6 plays, 18 yards, 3:02.

Top passers

- NE – Tom Brady – 25/33, 276 yards, 3 TD
- MIA – Matt Moore – 24/34, 205 yards, 2 TD, INT

Top rushers

- NE – LeGarrette Blount – 14 rushes, 51 yards, TD
- MIA – Jay Ajayi – 16 rushes, 59 yards

Top receivers

- NE – Julian Edelman – 8 receptions, 151 yards, TD
- MIA – Jarvis Landry – 9 receptions, 76 yards, TD

The Patriots took the opening kickoff right down the field, marching 75 yards in 13 plays, taking seven-and-a-half minutes off the clock, to score on a two-yard touchdown pass from Brady to Bennett. After a Dolphins three-and-out, starting at the Dolphins 45, the Patriots needed just five plays to score on a 14-yard touchdown pass from Brady to Michael Floyd, who managed to get into the end zone while fighting through 4 defenders for his first touchdown as a Patriot. On the next Dolphins' possession, Matt Moore was intercepted by Logan Ryan. Beginning at their own 44 yard line, the Patriots managed to reach the Dolphins' 22, but were forced to settle for a 40-yard field goal, extending the lead to 17–0 on the first play of the second quarter. Once again, the Dolphins offense remained lifeless and they punted. The Patriots scored again, driving from their own 10 all the way to the Dolphins 8, but the Miami defense stiffened, and the Patriots settled for a 26-yard field goal by Gostkowski, increasing the Patriots lead to 20–0 with just over three minutes remaining in the first half. The Dolphins finally answered on their next drive, putting together a 10 play, 75-yard drive, with Jarvis Landry scoring on an 8-yard touchdown pass in which he was knocked back by Dont'a Hightower but still managed to reach the end zone pylon. Develin returned the ensuing squib kick 15 yards to the Patriots 43 with 0:23 seconds remaining. The Patriots drove to the Dolphins 34, but Gostkowski missed the 52-yard field goal attempt wide-right, keeping the score 20–7 at half time. The Dolphins struck again, taking the opening possession 75 yards in 12 plays, with Moore bombing a 24-yard touchdown pass to Kenny Stills, trimming the deficit to just 20–14. The Patriots countered, facing a 3rd-and-7 from the Patriots 23, Brady connected with Edelman on a quick-screen, aided by a huge block by Floyd, 77-yards for a touchdown, widening the lead to 27–14. Neither team scored for the remainder of the quarter. Early in the fourth quarter, the Dolphins drove all the way to the Patriots 9, but on 2nd-and-goal Damien Williams was stripped by McCourty with Shea McClellin returning it 69 yards to the Dolphins 18. Six plays later, Blount scored on a 1-yard run with a successful two point conversion to give the Patriots a 35–14 lead. Neither team did anything for the remainder of the game and the Patriots won.

With this win, the Patriots clinch home field advantage throughout the entire AFC playoffs. They also finished with a record of 14–2 (5-1 against the AFC East) for the first time since 2010. This was the Patriots first win in Miami since the 2012 season. The win also marked the first time since 2007 the Patriots finished 8-0 on the road. Julian Edelman had a huge day against the Dolphins as he had 151 yards of receiving in 9 receptions, 6 rushing yards, and 1 receiving touchdown. This would be the Pats last sweep over the Dolphins until 2025.

== Postseason ==
=== AFC Divisional Playoffs: vs (4) Houston Texans ===
AFC Divisional Playoffs: (4) Houston Texans at (1) New England Patriots – Game summary

Quarter	1	2	3	4	Total
Texans	3	10	0	3	16
Patriots	14	3	7	10	34

at Gillette Stadium, Foxborough, Massachusetts

- Date: January 14, 2017
- Game time: 8:15 p.m. EST
- Game weather: 28 °F (−2 °C), cloudy and cold
- Game attendance: 66,829
- Referee: Pete Morelli
- TV announcers (CBS): Jim Nantz, Phil Simms, Tracy Wolfson, and Jay Feely
- Recap, Gamebook

Game information

First quarter

- NE – Dion Lewis 13-yard pass from Tom Brady (Stephen Gostkowski kick), 9:27. Patriots 7–0. Drive: 2 plays, 65 yards, 0:43.
- HOU – Nick Novak 33-yard field goal, 1:15. Patriots 7–3. Drive: 14 plays, 62 yards, 8:12.
- NE – Dion Lewis 98-yard kickoff return (Stephen Gostkowski kick), 1:00. Patriots 14–3. Drive: 0 plays, 0 yards, 0:15.

Second quarter

- HOU – Nick Novak 27-yard field goal, 11:36. Patriots 14–6. Drive: 6 plays, 18 yards, 2:48.
- HOU – C. J. Fiedorowicz 10-yard pass from Brock Osweiler (Nick Novak kick), 10:49. Patriots 14–13. Drive: 2 plays, 12 yards, 0:40.
- NE – Stephen Gostkowski 19-yard field goal, 0:07. Patriots 17–13. Drive: 10 plays, 66 yards, 3:47.

Third quarter

- NE – James White 19-yard pass from Tom Brady (Stephen Gostkowski kick), 9:09. Patriots 24–13. Drive: 9 plays, 90 yards, 3:21.

Fourth quarter

- HOU – Nick Novak 46-yard field goal, 14:51. Patriots 24–16. Drive: 4 plays, 6 yards, 0:50.
- NE – Dion Lewis 1-yard run (Stephen Gostkowski kick), 12:16. Patriots 31–16. Drive: 2 plays, 6 yards, 0:28.
- NE – Stephen Gostkowski 43-yard field goal, 6:37. Patriots 34–16. Drive: 10 plays, 43 yards, 3:45.

Top passers

- HOU – Brock Osweiler – 23/40, 198 yards, TD, 3 INT
- NE – Tom Brady – 18/38, 287 yards, 2 TD, 2 INT

Top rushers

- HOU – Lamar Miller – 19 rushes, 73 yards
- NE – Dion Lewis – 13 rushes, 41 yards, TD

Top receivers

- HOU – DeAndre Hopkins – 6 receptions, 65 yards
- NE – Julian Edelman – 8 receptions, 137 yards

With this win, the Patriots advance to the AFC Championship for the 6th time in a row. After throwing only two regular-season interceptions in 437 attempts, Tom Brady surprisingly threw 2 in this game. Dion Lewis had a big night with three total touchdowns - 1 receiving, 1 rushing, and 1 returning. He became the first player to ever accomplish this in the NFL Postseason. Furthermore, the Patriots' defensive backs also played outstandingly in this game, especially cornerback Logan Ryan, safety Devin McCourty, and safety Duron Harmon who all recorded one interception each. In a coincidence, they were all alumni of Rutgers University and played on its football team. In the locker room after the match, coach Bill Belichick acknowledged the work of the Rutgers' alumni as he was quoted for saying, "Big day for Rutgers." Also, on a 44-yard pass from Brady to wide receiver Julian Edelman, Edelman surpassed former Patriot Wes Welker for most receptions in the postseason; breaking the former Patriots' record of 69. He finished the game with 76 career receptions. This would be the last time the Patriots would play against the Texans in the playoffs until 2025.

=== AFC Championship: vs (3) Pittsburgh Steelers ===
AFC Championship: (3) Pittsburgh Steelers at (1) New England Patriots – Game summary

Quarter	1	2	3	4	Total
Steelers	0	9	0	8	17
Patriots	10	7	16	3	36

at Gillette Stadium, Foxborough, Massachusetts

- Date: January 22, 2017
- Game time: 6:40 p.m. EST
- Game weather: 41 °F (5 °C), cloudy
- Game attendance: 66,829
- Referee: Terry McAulay
- TV announcers (CBS): Jim Nantz, Phil Simms, Tracy Wolfson and Jay Feely
- Recap, Gamebook

Game information

First quarter

- NE – Stephen Gostkowski 31-yard field goal, 13:08. Patriots 3–0. Drive: 6 plays, 62 yards, 1:52.
- NE – Chris Hogan 16-yard pass from Tom Brady (Stephen Gostkowski kick), 2:47. Patriots 10–0. Drive: 11 plays, 80 yards, 4:36.

Second quarter

- PIT – DeAngelo Williams 5-yard run (kick failed, wide left), 11:31. Patriots 10–6. Drive: 13 plays, 84 yards, 6:16.
- NE – Chris Hogan 34-yard pass from Tom Brady (Stephen Gostkowski kick), 7:43. Patriots 17–6. Drive: 9 plays, 82 yards, 3:48.
- PIT – Chris Boswell 23-yard field goal, 1:39. Patriots 17–9. Drive: 15 plays, 70 yards, 6:04.

Third quarter

- NE – Stephen Gostkowski 47-yard field goal, 9:59. Patriots 20–9. Drive: 9 plays, 55 yards, 3:11.
- NE – LeGarrette Blount 1-yard run (Stephen Gostkowski kick), 2:44. Patriots 27–9. Drive: 8 plays, 88 yards, 3:52.
- NE – Julian Edelman 10-yard pass from Tom Brady (kick failed, wide right), 1:35. Patriots 33–9. Drive: 4 plays, 28 yards, 1:01.

Fourth quarter

- NE – Stephen Gostkowski 26-yard field goal, 6:24. Patriots 36–9. Drive: 8 plays, 24 yards, 3:5.
- PIT – Cobi Hamilton 30-yard pass from Ben Roethlisberger (Ben Roethlisberger-DeAngelo Williams pass), 3:36. Patriots 36–17. Drive: 9 plays, 75 yards, 2:48.

Top passers

- PIT – Ben Roethlisberger – 31/47, 314 yards, TD, INT
- NE – Tom Brady – 32/42, 384 yards, 3 TD

Top rushers

- PIT – DeAngelo Williams – 14 rushes, 34 yards, TD
- NE – LeGarrette Blount – 16 rushes, 47 yards, TD

Top receivers

- PIT – Antonio Brown – 7 receptions, 77 yards
- NE – Chris Hogan – 9 receptions, 180 yards, 2 TD

In a rematch of the regular season meeting between these two teams, the Patriots proved to be the superior team, cruising to the seventh Super Bowl of the Brady–Belichick era (ninth overall).

The Patriots took the opening kickoff and marched all the way to the Steelers 13, but Malcolm Mitchell dropped a wide open pass on 3rd-and-1 and the Patriots settled for a 31-yard Gostkowski field goal. After the next few drives ended in punts, quarterback Tom Brady capped of an 80-yard drive with a 16-yard touchdown pass to Chris Hogan for a 10–0 lead. The Steelers countered with an 11-play, 84-yard drive with DeAngelo Williams scoring on a 5-yard touchdown run (with a missed PAT) early in the second quarter. The Patriots answered the Steelers, though, storming 82 yards with a flea flicker from Dion Lewis to Brady, resulting in a 34-yard touchdown pass to Hogan. The touchdown pass increased Brady's all-time playoff record to 19 as well as Hogan having his first career 100-yard receiving playoff game in just his second career playoff game. The Steelers then answered with a 70-yard, marathon drive, but were only able to score on a 23-yard field goal by Chris Boswell, trimming the deficit to 17–9 at halftime. On the drive, Ben Roethlisberger seemingly hit tight end Jesse James for a 19-yard touchdown pass, but a review ruled James down at the 1, but the Patriots kept the Steelers out of the endzone. After forcing the Steelers to punt on their opening drive, the Patriots marched 55 yards in 9 plays with Gostkowski increasing the Patriots lead to 20–9 on a field goal on a 47-yard field goal by Gostkowski. The Steelers seemed primed to respond, driving to the Patriots 39, but the Patriots defense clamped down again, and the Steelers punted. The Patriots took advantage and stormed 88 yards with LeGarrette Blount carrying half of the Steelers to the 1-yard line then finishing off the drive on the next play and the Patriots began to pull away leading 27–9. A 39-yard pass to Hogan on the drive gave Brady his 11th career 300-yard passing game in the playoffs and Hogan with 180 yards receiving broke the previous record of 153 yards set by Deion Branch. The Steelers situation grew worse on the first play of the Steelers next drive, Kyle Van Noy stripped Eli Rogers after a 5-yard catch with Rob Ninkovich recovering at the Steelers 28-yard line. Four plays later, Brady found Edelman for a 10-yard touchdown, widening the lead to 33–9 (with a missed PAT). The Steelers then stormed all the way to Patriots 2-yard line, but turned the ball over on downs early in the fourth quarter. After forcing the Patriots to punt, Eric Rowe intercepted Roethlisberger and returned the ball 37 yards to the Steelers 32, ending any hope of a miraculous comeback. Eight plays later, Gostkowski kicked a 26-yard field goal giving the Patriots a 36–9 lead. Roethlisberger struck back with a 30-yard touchdown pass plus a two-point conversion, trimming the deficit to 36–17. The onside kick went out of bounds and the Patriots ran out the clock to win the game.

During the game, the Patriots broke numerous records. One of the records was by placekicker Stephen Gostkowski, in which he set the Patriots' franchise record for most postseason field goals in a career. He passed former Patriot Adam Vinatieri who had 26 with the franchise. He only trails three other kickers in the history of the NFL who are Gary Anderson (32), David Akers (39), and Vinatieri who now has 51 after he added 25 with the Indianapolis Colts. Adding to this, wide receiver Julian Edelman made a new record of most receptions yards in the playoff by a Patriot. He surpassed Deion Branch for the record. Surprisingly, both of these records were made in the first drive of the Patriots. Next, wide receiver Chris Hogan set the single-game franchise receiving record in the postseason. He finished the game with a total of 180 yards along with 2 touchdowns. Finally, with the win, the Patriots set the record for most Super Bowls ever attended by a single franchise with 9. They surpassed the Pittsburgh Steelers, Dallas Cowboys, and Denver Broncos who are all tied at 8. This will be the 7th for the Brady-Belichick tandem. As of 2025, this remains the most recent playoff match-up between the Patriots & the Steelers.

=== Super Bowl LI: vs. Atlanta Falcons ===
Super Bowl LI: New England Patriots vs. Atlanta Falcons – Game summary

Quarter	1	2	3	4	OT	Total
Patriots	0	3	6	19	6	34
Falcons	0	21	7	0	0	28

at NRG Stadium, Houston, Texas

- Date: February 5, 2017
- Game time: 6:30 p.m. EST/5:30 p.m. CST
- Game weather: Played indoors (retractable roof closed)
- Game attendance: 70,807
- Referee: Carl Cheffers
- TV announcers (Fox): Joe Buck, Troy Aikman, Erin Andrews and Chris Myers
- Recap, Gamebook

Game information

First quarter

- No scoring plays.

Second quarter

- ATL – Devonta Freeman 5-yard run (Matt Bryant kick), 12:15. Falcons 7–0. Drive: 5 plays, 71 yards, 1:53.
- ATL – Austin Hooper 19-yard pass from Matt Ryan (Matt Bryant kick), 8:48. Falcons 14–0. Drive: 5 plays, 62 yards, 1:49.
- ATL – Robert Alford 82-yard interception return (Matt Bryant kick), 2:21. Falcons 21–0.
- NE – Stephen Gostkowski 41-yard field goal, 0:02. Falcons 21–3. Drive: 11 plays, 52 yards, 2:19.

Third quarter

- ATL – Tevin Coleman 6-yard pass from Matt Ryan (Matt Bryant kick), 8:31. Falcons 28–3. Drive: 8 plays, 85 yards, 4:14.
- NE – James White 5-yard pass from Tom Brady (kick failed, wide right), 2:06. Falcons 28–9. Drive: 13 plays, 75 yards, 6:25.

Fourth quarter

- NE – Stephen Gostkowski 33-yard field goal, 9:44. Falcons 28–12. Drive: 12 plays, 72 yards, 5:07.
- NE – Danny Amendola 6-yard pass from Tom Brady (James White run), 5:56. Falcons 28–20. Drive: 5 plays, 25 yards, 2:28.
- NE – James White 1-yard run (Tom Brady-Danny Amendola pass), 0:57. Tied 28–28. Drive: 10 plays, 91 yards, 2:33.

Overtime

- NE – James White 2-yard run, 11:02. Patriots 34–28. Drive: 8 plays, 75 yards, 3:58.

Top passers

- NE – Tom Brady – 43/62, 466 yards, 2 TD, INT
- ATL – Matt Ryan – 17/23, 284 yards, 2 TD

Top rushers

- NE – LeGarrette Blount – 11 rushes, 31 yards
- ATL – Devonta Freeman – 11 rushes, 75 yards, TD

Top receivers

- NE – James White – 14 receptions, 110 yards, TD
- ATL – Julio Jones – 4 receptions, 87 yards

Both the Patriots and Falcons were held scoreless in the first quarter of Super Bowl LI. After a LeGarrette Blount fumble in Atlanta territory early in the second quarter gave the Falcons possession, the offense drove 71 yards in 5 plays, with running back Devonta Freeman capping the drive off with a 5-yard touchdown run to put the Falcons up 7–0 with 12:20 left in the second quarter. After a Patriots punt, the Falcons quickly returned to the red zone, where tight end Austin Hooper caught a 19-yard pass in the back of the end zone from Atlanta quarterback Matt Ryan to extend the Falcons' lead to 14–0. The Patriots then drove to the Atlanta 23-yard line (aided by three Falcons holding penalties that negated third-down stops) where cornerback Robert Alford intercepted a Tom Brady pass intended for Danny Amendola and returned 82 yards for a touchdown to put the Falcons up 21–0 with 2:21 left in the first half. The ensuing Patriots possession resulted in a 41-yard Stephen Gostkowski field goal with five seconds left in the first half, leaving the score 21–3 in favor of Atlanta at halftime.

After the two teams traded punts to begin the second half, the Falcons drove 85 yards in 8 plays, with Ryan throwing a 6-yard touchdown pass from Ryan to running back Tevin Coleman, putting Atlanta up 28–3, with 8:31 left in the 3rd quarter. A fourth-down pass from Brady to Amendola extended the Patriots' ensuing drive, which ended with a 5-yard touchdown pass from Brady to James White to cut the Patriots' deficit to 28–9 with 2:06 left in the 3rd quarter after Gostkowski missed the extra point. After a failed onside-kick attempt and a Falcons punt, the Patriots drove inside the Atlanta 10-yard line, but Brady was sacked twice in three plays and the Patriots settled for a 33-yard Gostkowski field goal to make the score 28–12 with 9:44 remaining in regulation. On third and one on the Falcons' next drive, Dont'a Hightower sacked Ryan and forced a fumble, which was recovered by Alan Branch at the Falcons' 25-yard line. With new life, Brady threw a 6-yard touchdown to Amendola, and James White took a direct snap into the end zone for a 2-point conversion to make the score 28–20 with 5:56 left. The Falcons then drove to the New England 22-yard line, aided by a Devonta Freeman 39-yard catch-and-run and a 27-yard sideline catch by Julio Jones, and were in range to kick a field goal to go up by 11 points and virtually seal the win. However, a 12-yard sack and a holding penalty knocked Atlanta out of field goal range, and they were forced to punt. Starting at their own 9-yard line, the Patriots drove 91 yards in 10 plays, with James White scoring a one-yard touchdown with 57 seconds left in regulation to make the score 28–26. On the ensuing 2-point attempt, Danny Amendola took a Brady screen pass into the end zone to tie the game, completing a 25-point comeback, the largest in Super Bowl history.

For the first time in Super Bowl history, the game went into overtime. New England won the coin toss, calling "heads" and chose to receive the kick. After passes from Brady to White, Amendola, Chris Hogan, and Julian Edelman, as well as a 10-yard rush by White, the Patriots had first-and-10 at the Falcons' 15-yard line. A pass interference penalty against De'Vondre Campbell put the ball at the Atlanta 2. After an incomplete pass intended for Martellus Bennett, James White took a toss to the right and dove at the goal line for a touchdown, winning Super Bowl LI for the Patriots, 34–28.

With the victory, the Patriots won their fifth Super Bowl, tying them with the Dallas Cowboys and San Francisco 49ers for the second most of all time. The win was also the fifth Super Bowl victory for Tom Brady and Bill Belichick, both setting records (Belichick surpassing Chuck Noll for most Super Bowl wins by a head coach, and Brady surpassing Joe Montana and Terry Bradshaw for most Super Bowl wins by a quarterback). Brady was named Super Bowl MVP for the fourth time, also setting a record.

The following are the records surpassed by the Patriots in Super Bowl LI:

- Most games by a player: 7, Tom Brady
- Most games by a coach: 7, Bill Belichick
- Most games won by a quarterback: 5, Tom Brady
- Most games won by a coach: 5, Bill Belichick
- Most points in a game: 20, James White
- Most passes in a game: 62, Tom Brady
- Most completions in a game: 43, Tom Brady
- Most passing yards in a game: 466, Tom Brady
- Most receptions in a game: 14, James White
- Largest deficit overcome by the winning team: 25 points, Patriots
- Most points in overtime in a game: 6, Patriots
- Most first downs in a game by a team: 37, Patriots
- Most first downs in a game by both teams: 54, Patriots and Falcons
- Most first downs passing in a game by a team: 26, Patriots
- Most first downs passing in a game by both teams: 39, Patriots and Falcons
- Most offensive plays in a game by a team: 93, Patriots
- Most passing yards in a game by both teams: 682, Patriots and Falcons
- Most completions in a Super Bowl career: 207, Tom Brady
- Most passing yards in a Super Bowl career: 2,071, Tom Brady
- Most touchdown passes in a Super Bowl career: 15, Tom Brady

The following are the records tied by the Patriots in Super Bowl LI:

- Most games won by a player: 5, Tom Brady
- Most touchdowns in a game: 3, James White.
- Most two-point conversions in a game by a team: 2, Patriots
- Most first downs by penalty in a game: 4, Patriots

== Standings ==
=== Division ===
AFC East
	W	L	T	PCT	DIV	CONF	PF	PA	STK
^{(1)} New England Patriots	14	2	0	.875	5–1	11–1	441	250	W7
^{(6)} Miami Dolphins	10	6	0	.625	4–2	7–5	363	380	L1
Buffalo Bills	7	9	0	.438	1–5	4–8	399	378	L2
New York Jets	5	11	0	.313	2–4	4–8	275	409	W1

=== Conference ===
AFC
#	Team	Division	W	L	T	PCT	DIV	CONF	SOS	SOV	STK
Division leaders
1	New England Patriots	East	14	2	0	.875	5–1	11–1	.439	.424	W7
2 (Note: Kansas City clinched the AFC West division over Oakland based on head-to-head sweep.)	Kansas City Chiefs	West	12	4	0	.750	6–0	9–3	.508	.479	W2
3	Pittsburgh Steelers	North	11	5	0	.688	5–1	9–3	.494	.423	W7
4 (Note: Houston clinched the AFC South division title over Tennessee based on record vs. division opponents.)	Houston Texans	South	9	7	0	.563	5–1	7–5	.502	.427	L1
Wild Cards
5	Oakland Raiders	West	12	4	0	.750	3–3	9–3	.504	.443	L1
6	Miami Dolphins	East	10	6	0	.625	4–2	7–5	.455	.341	L1
Did not qualify for the postseason
7 (Note: Tennessee finished ahead of Denver based on head-to-head victory.)	Tennessee Titans	South	9	7	0	.563	2–4	6–6	.465	.458	W1
8	Denver Broncos	West	9	7	0	.563	2–4	6–6	.549	.455	W1
9 (Note: Baltimore finished ahead of Indianapolis based on record vs. conference opponents.)	Baltimore Ravens	North	8	8	0	.500	4–2	7–5	.498	.363	L2
10	Indianapolis Colts	South	8	8	0	.500	3–3	5–7	.492	.406	W1
11	Buffalo Bills	East	7	9	0	.438	1–5	4–8	.482	.339	L2
12	Cincinnati Bengals	North	6	9	1	.406	3–3	5–7	.521	.333	W1
13 (Note: The New York Jets finished ahead of San Diego based record vs. common opponents — the Jets' cumulative record against Cleveland, Indianapolis, Kansas City and Miami was 1–4, while San Diego's cumulative record against the same four teams was 0–5.)	New York Jets	East	5	11	0	.313	2–4	4–8	.518	.313	W1
14	San Diego Chargers	West	5	11	0	.313	1–5	4–8	.543	.513	L5
15	Jacksonville Jaguars	South	3	13	0	.188	2–4	2–10	.527	.417	L1
16	Cleveland Browns	North	1	15	0	.063	0–6	1–11	.549	.313	L1
Tiebreakers (Note: When breaking ties for three or more teams under the NFL's rules, they are first broken within divisions, then comparing only the highest ranked remaining team from each division.)

== Statistics ==
=== Team leaders ===
Category	Player(s)	Value
Passing yards	Tom Brady	3,554
Passing touchdowns	Tom Brady	28
Rushing yards	LeGarrette Blount	1,161
Rushing touchdowns	LeGarrette Blount	18
Receptions	Julian Edelman	98
Receiving yards	Julian Edelman	1,106
Receiving touchdowns	Martellus Bennett	7
Points	Stephen Gostkowski	127
Kickoff return yards	Cyrus Jones	180
Punt return yards	Julian Edelman	135
Tackles	Logan Ryan	92
Sacks	Trey Flowers	7
Forced fumbles	Nate Ebner; Jonathan Jones	2
Interceptions	Malcolm Butler	4

=== League rankings ===
Offense
Category	Value	NFL rank (out of 32)
Total yards	386.2 YPG	4th
Yards per play	5.9	6th
Rushing yards	117.0 YPG	7th
Yards per rush	3.9	T–24th
Passing yards	269.2 YPG	4th
Yards per pass	8.1	3rd
Total touchdowns	51	T–3rd
Rushing touchdowns	19	5th
Receiving touchdowns	32	T–6th
Scoring	27.6 PPG	3rd
Pass completions	368/550 (.669)	T–15th
Third downs	104/227 (.458)	4th
First downs per game	21.9	5th
Possession average	31:13	6th
Fewest sacks allowed	24	5th
Turnover differential	+12	3rd
Fewest penalties	93	4th
Fewest penalty yardage	819	4th

Defense
Category	Value	NFL rank (out of 32)
Total yards	326.4 YPG	8th
Yards per play	5.2	T–8th
Rushing yards	88.6 YPG	T–3rd
Yards per rush	3.9	T–8th
Passing yards	237.9 YPG	12th
Yards per pass	6.8	T–7th
Total touchdowns	27	2nd
Rushing touchdowns	6	1st
Receiving touchdowns	21	T–8th
Scoring	15.6 PPG	1st
Pass completions	368/596 (.617)	11th
Third downs	76/206 (.364)	7th
First downs per game	18.4	T–3rd
Sacks	34	T–16th
Forced fumbles	16	T–7th
Fumble recoveries	10	T–9th
Interceptions	13	T–15th
Fewest penalties	110	T–24th
Fewest penalty yardage	930	T–17th

Special Teams
Category	Value	NFL rank (out of 32)
Kickoff returns	18.7 YPR	27th
Punt returns	6.9 YPR	25th
Gross punting	44.7 YPP	22nd
Net punting	42.8 YPP	8th
Kickoff coverage	19.3 YPR	3rd
Punt coverage	5.0 YPR	2nd

Source for this section: NFL.com.

== Awards and honors ==
Recipient	Award(s)
Ryan Allen	Week 3: AFC Special Teams Player of the Week
LeGarrette Blount	September: AFC Offensive Player of the Month
Tom Brady	Week 5: AFC Offensive Player of the Week; Week 11: AFC Offensive Player of the Week; October: AFC Offensive Player of the Month; 2016 NFL 101 AFC Offensive Player of the Year; 2016 Sporting News Offensive Player of the Year; 2016 Pro Football Focus Best Player Award; 2016 Pro Football Focus Best Passer Award; Super Bowl LI Most Valuable Player
Julian Edelman	Week 17: AFC Offensive Player of the Week
Stephen Gostkowski	Week 1: AFC Special Teams Player of the Week; Week 13: AFC Special Teams Player of the Week
Rob Gronkowski	2016 New England Patriots Ron Burton Community Service Award
Dont'a Hightower	Week 6: AFC Defensive Player of the Week
Matthew Slater	2017 Bart Starr Award
Nate Solder	2016 New England Patriots Ed Block Courage Award
Patriots Training Staff	2016 Ed Block Courage Award NFL Athletic Training Staff of the Year

=== Pro Bowl and All-Pro selections ===
Four Patriots were elected to the 2017 Pro Bowl. Quarterback Tom Brady, linebacker Dont'a Hightower, safety Devin McCourty, and special teamer Matthew Slater were all named as starters. However, none of them participated because the Patriots reached Super Bowl LI.

Seven Patriots were elected to the 2016 All-Pro Team. Only Slater was named to the first team as a special teamer. Everyone else was named to second team. This included pro bowlers Brady, Hightower, and McCourty. Adding to this, there was also tackle Marcus Cannon, cornerback Malcolm Butler, and special teamer Nate Ebner.
