= James Hardy =

James Hardy may refer to:

== Sports ==
- James Hardy (wide receiver) (1985–2017), American football wide receiver
- Jim Hardy (1923–2019), American football quarterback
- James Hardy (American football coach) (born 1981), American football coach
- James Hardy (basketball) (1956–2020), American professional basketball player
- James Hardy (gymnast) (born 2003), Australian gymnast
- James Hardy (rower) (1923–1986), American rower and Olympic gold medalist
- James Hardy (sailor) (1932–2023), Olympic Australian sailor and America's Cup skipper
- J. J. Hardy (James Jerry Hardy, born 1982), American professional baseball player
- James Hardy (footballer) (born 1996), English footballer

== Others ==
- James Hardy (naturalist) (1815–1898), Scottish naturalist and antiquarian
- James Hardy (surgeon) (1918–2003), American surgeon
- James D. Hardy Jr. (born 1934), American academic and historian
- James Hardy Jnr. (1832–1889), British artist
- James Earl Hardy (born 1966), American playwright, novelist, and journalist
- James Greene Hardy (1795–1856), Kentucky politician and orator; lieutenant governor of Kentucky
- James J. Hardy, member of the South Carolina legislature, 1870–1871
- James Hardy, character in Andy Hardy Meets Debutante

== See also ==
- James Hardie (disambiguation)
- Jim Hardy (comic strip), a 1936–1942 American adventure comic strip
