= Trey Flowers =

American football player (born 1993)

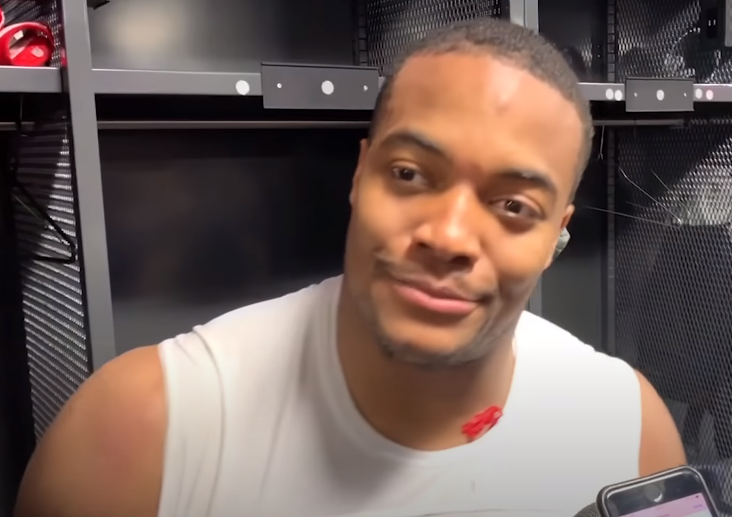
- Flowers in 2019

No. 98, 90, 93
- Position: Defensive end

Personal information
- Born: August 16, 1993 (age 33); Huntsville, Alabama, U.S.
- Listed height: 6 ft 2 in (1.88 m)
- Listed weight: 265 lb (120 kg)

Career information
- High school: Columbia (Huntsville)
- College: Arkansas (2011–2014)
- NFL draft: 2015: 4th round, 101st overall pick

Career history
- New England Patriots (2015–2018); Detroit Lions (2019–2021); Miami Dolphins (2022); New England Patriots (2023)

Awards and highlights
- 2× Super Bowl champion (LI, LIII); New England Patriots All-2010s Team; 2× Second-team All-SEC (2013, 2014)

Career NFL statistics
- Total tackles: 265
- Sacks: 31.5
- Forced fumbles: 10
- Fumble recoveries: 4
- Pass deflections: 7
- Stats at Pro Football Reference

Robert Lee "Trey" Flowers III (born August 16, 1993) is an American former professional football player who was a defensive end in the National Football League (NFL). He played college football for the Arkansas Razorbacks and was selected by the New England Patriots in the fourth round of the 2015 NFL draft. Flowers has also played for the Detroit Lions and Miami Dolphins.

== Early life ==
Flowers attended Columbia High School in Huntsville, Alabama. He was ranked by Rivals.com as a three-star recruit. He originally committed to Georgia Tech to play college football but changed to the University of Arkansas. Flowers also played basketball in high school.

== College career ==
Flowers played in all 13 games with three starts as a true freshman in 2011, recording 28 total tackles, 5.5 tackles for loss and a sack.

As a sophomore in 2012, Flowers started all 13 games, recording 50 total tackles, 13 tackles for loss, and six sacks.

Flowers started 11 games as a junior in 2013, missing one due to injury. He finished the year with 44 total tackles, 13.5 tackles for loss, and five sacks. He also recorded an interception and three forced fumbles. After his junior season, Flowers considered entering the 2014 NFL draft and received a third-round draft grade from the NFL Draft Advisory Board, but he eventually chose to return to Arkansas for his senior year.

In his last season playing for the Razorbacks, Flowers led the team in tackles for loss and sacks, respectively with 15.5 and six. He finished his collegiate career with 190 tackles, 47.5 tackles for loss, 18 sacks, an interception, 13 passes defended, and four forced fumbles.

== Professional career ==
=== Pre-draft ===
Pre-draft measurables
Height	Weight	Arm length	Hand span	Wingspan	40-yard dash	10-yard split	20-yard split	20-yard shuttle	Three-cone drill	Vertical jump	Broad jump	Bench press
6 ft 2 1/8 in (1.88 m)	266 lb (121 kg)	34 1/4 in (0.87 m)	10 in (0.25 m)	7 ft 0 1/2 in (2.15 m)	4.85 s	1.63 s	2.82 s	4.40 s	7.26 s	36.5 in (0.93 m)	10 ft 1 in (3.07 m)	28 reps
All values from NFL Combine/Pro Day

At the 2015 NFL Combine, Flowers was a top performer in both the vertical and broad jump.

=== New England Patriots (first stint) ===
==== 2015 season ====
The New England Patriots selected Flowers in the fourth round (101st overall) of the 2015 NFL draft. The pick used to draft him was acquired from the Tampa Bay Buccaneers, along with tight end Tim Wright, in exchange for Logan Mankins. In the first preseason game against the Green Bay Packers, Flowers sacked Aaron Rodgers but later left the game with a shoulder injury. Flowers made the Patriots 53-man roster, but was only active for one game before being placed on injured reserve on December 1, 2015.

==== 2016 season ====
After missing most of his rookie season due to injury, Flowers had a breakout season in 2016. During a Week 8 road victory of 41–25 over the Buffalo Bills, he recorded his first two NFL sacks on quarterbacks Tyrod Taylor and EJ Manuel while tacking on five tackles. Flowers played in all 16 regular season games, starting in the final eight, finishing the season leading the team in sacks (7), all coming in the last nine games of the season. He also led the team with 2.5 sacks in the Patriots' 34–28 overtime victory in Super Bowl LI over the Atlanta Falcons on February 5, 2017. These included the crucial second down sack with 3:55 to go in the fourth quarter that helped push the Falcons out of field goal range, allowing the Patriots to tie the game on the following possession, completing their 25-point comeback.

==== 2017 season ====
After a breakout season in 2016, Flowers began the way he ended the previous season, recording two sacks in the season-opening 42–27 loss to the Kansas City Chiefs. Despite suffering a rib injury in Week 12 against the Miami Dolphins, Flowers started 14 games and led the team with 6.5 sacks. Flowers helped the Patriots reach Super Bowl LII, but the team lost 41–33 to the Philadelphia Eagles with Flowers recording five tackles.

==== 2018 season ====
During Week 1 against the Houston Texans, Flowers had 5 tackles and 1.5 sacks. In the next game against the Jacksonville Jaguars, he forced a fumble but was later ruled out of the game after suffering a concussion. Flowers finished the season with 57 tackles, a career-high 7.5 sacks, and three forced fumbles. The Patriots beat both the Los Angeles Chargers and the Chiefs to reach Super Bowl LIII where they defeated the Los Angeles Rams 13–3. Flowers had three tackles in the game.

=== Detroit Lions ===
==== 2019 season ====
On March 14, 2019, Flowers signed a five-year, $90 million deal with the Detroit Lions. The signing reunited Flowers with former Patriots wide receiver Danny Amendola, who signed with the Lions three days earlier, alongside former defensive coordinator Matt Patricia, who became the Lions' head coach in the prior season. In Week 3 against the Philadelphia Eagles, Flowers recorded a team-high eight tackles and sacked Carson Wentz once as the Lions won 27–24. Three weeks later, Flowers was called for two controversial and costly hands to the face penalties on Monday Night Football in a narrow 22–23 loss to the Green Bay Packers. In Week 8 against the New York Giants, Flowers recorded a season-high two sacks on Daniel Jones in the 31–26 victory.

==== 2020 season ====
In Week 1 against the Chicago Bears, Flowers recorded his first sack of the season on Mitchell Trubisky during the 27–23 loss. In Week 6 against the Jacksonville Jaguars, Flowers recorded a strip sack on Gardner Minshew which was recovered by the Lions during the 34–16 victory. Flowers was placed on injured reserve on November 2 after suffering an injury in Week 8.

==== 2021 season ====
On December 4, 2021, Flowers was placed on injured reserve.

On March 16, 2022, the Lions released Flowers.

=== Miami Dolphins ===
On August 28, 2022, the Miami Dolphins signed Flowers. On October 19, Flowers was placed on injured reserve.

=== New England Patriots (second stint) ===
On August 8, 2023, Flowers signed with the New England Patriots. He was placed on the reserve/PUP list to start the season. The Patriots then released Flowers on October 24.

== NFL career statistics ==
Legend
	Won the Super Bowl
**Bold**	Career high

=== Regular season ===
Year	Team	Games		Tackles					Interceptions						Fumbles			
Year	Team	GP	GS	Cmb	Solo	Ast	Sck	Sfty	PD	Int	Yds	Avg	Lng	TD	FF	FR	Yds	TD
2015	NE	1	0	0	0	0	0	0	0	0	0	0.0	0	0	0	0	0	0
2016	NE	**16**	8	45	23	22	7.0	0	1	0	0	0.0	0	0	0	**2**	-3	0
2017	NE	14	14	**62**	**45**	17	6.5	0	**3**	0	0	0.0	0	0	2	0	0	0
2018	NE	15	**15**	57	32	**25**	**7.5**	0	2	0	0	0.0	0	0	**3**	0	0	0
2019	DET	15	15	51	33	18	7.0	0	0	0	0	0.0	0	0	2	0	0	0
2020	DET	7	5	22	12	10	2.0	0	1	0	0	0.0	0	0	2	1	4	0
2021	DET	7	7	24	15	9	1.5	0	0	0	0	0.0	0	0	1	1	0	0
Total		75	64	261	160	101	31.5	0	7	0	0	0.0	0	0	10	4	1	0

=== Postseason ===
Year	Team	Games		Tackles					Interceptions						Fumbles			
Year	Team	GP	GS	Cmb	Solo	Ast	Sck	Sfty	PD	Int	Yds	Avg	Lng	TD	FF	FR	Yds	TD
2015	NE	0	0	DNP														
2016	NE	**3**	**3**	16	6	**10**	**2.5**	0	0	0	0	0.0	0	0	0	0	0	0
2017	NE	**3**	**3**	**17**	**10**	7	1.0	0	**1**	0	0	0.0	0	0	0	0	0	0
2018	NE	**3**	**3**	6	5	1	2.0	0	0	0	0	0.0	0	0	0	0	0	0
Total		9	9	39	21	18	5.5	0	1	0	0	0.0	0	0	0	0	0	0
