= James Hardie (disambiguation) =

James Hardie Industries is a building materials company specializing in fiber cement siding.

James Hardie may also refer to:

- James Keir Hardie (1856–1915), founding member and first leader of the Labour Party in the United Kingdom
- James Hardie (architect) (died 1889), American architect
- James Allen Hardie (1823–1876), American soldier

== See also ==
- James Hardy (disambiguation)
