= Malcolm Mitchell =

American football player (born 1993)

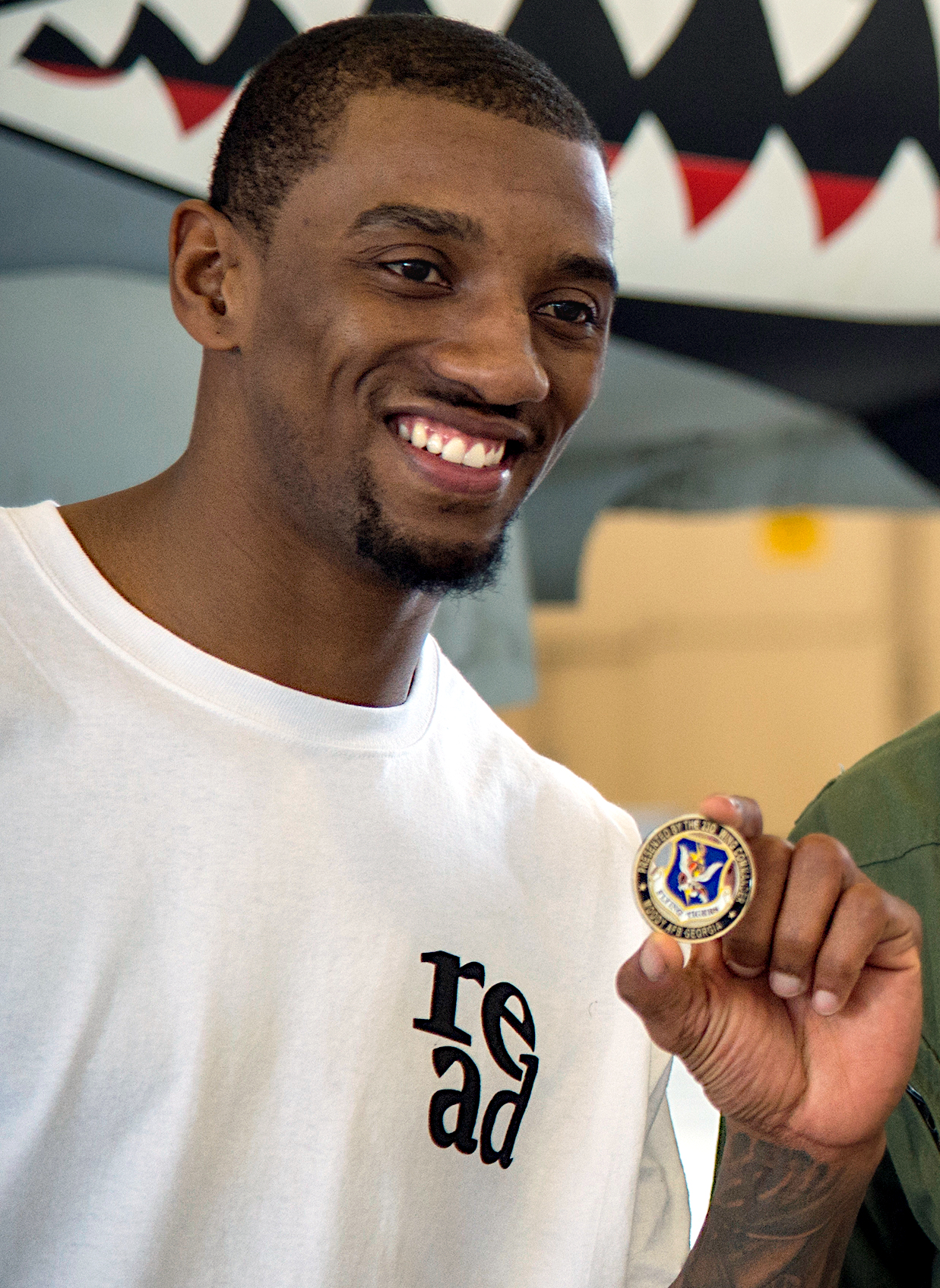
- Mitchell at Moody Air Force Base in 2017

No. 19
- Position: Wide receiver

Personal information
- Born: July 20, 1993 (age 33); Valdosta, Georgia, U.S.
- Listed height: 6 ft 1 in (1.85 m)
- Listed weight: 200 lb (91 kg)

Career information
- High school: Valdosta
- College: Georgia
- NFL draft: 2016: 4th round, 112th overall pick

Career history
- New England Patriots (2016–2017)

Awards and highlights
- Super Bowl champion (LI)

Career NFL statistics
- Receptions: 32
- Receiving yards: 401
- Receiving touchdowns: 4
- Stats at Pro Football Reference

Malcolm Jarod Mitchell (born July 20, 1993) is an American author, poet, and former professional football player. He played as a wide receiver for the New England Patriots of the National Football League (NFL).

Mitchell played college football for the Georgia Bulldogs. He was selected by New England in the fourth round of the 2016 NFL draft. He won an NFL title with the Patriots, winning Super Bowl LI. His NFL career lasted only two years due to knee injuries.

== College career ==
A graduate of Valdosta High School in Valdosta, Georgia, Mitchell played at the University of Georgia from 2011 to 2015 under head coach Mark Richt.

In 2011, as a true freshman, Mitchell was a Freshman All-Southeastern Conference (SEC). On October 8, against Tennessee, he recorded a season-high 126 receiving yards in the 20–12 victory. He caught 45 receptions for 665 yards (14.8 average) with a long of 71 yards and four touchdowns. Mitchell missed three games with a hamstring injury, but still finished fourth in the SEC in receiving yards per game.

In 2012, during his sophomore season at Georgia, he played in 13 games making nine starts, and was second on the team with 572 receiving yards on 40 catches and played on defense through the fourth game of the season. On October 20, against Kentucky, he recorded 103 receiving yards in the 29–24 victory. Mitchell was the recipient of the Charley Trippi Most Versatile Player award. Mitchell practiced at cornerback and spent time there throughout spring practice as well.

In 2013, Mitchell redshirted after tearing his ACL in Georgia’s first game of the season against Clemson. After Todd Gurley’s 75 yard touchdown run in the first quarter, Mitchell ran to the end zone to celebrate with Gurley but came up awkwardly, causing the knee injury. In 2014, Mitchell played in 8 games, making only 3 starts and caught 31 passes for 248 yards; he won the team's Comeback Player of the Year award.

In 2015, as a redshirt senior, Mitchell started all 13 games and was named an offensive captain. Mitchell caught 58 receptions for 865 yards (14.9 average). On September 19, against South Carolina, he recorded 122 receiving yards and a touchdown. In the final game of his collegiate career, in the TaxSlayer Bowl against Penn State, he recorded 114 receiving yards and a touchdown. Off the field, Mitchell earned the David Jacobs Award, given annually to the player who best portrays courage, spirit, character and determination; the Haier Achievement Award, the SEC Community Service Team, and the 2016 Community Spirit Award. When he graduated, he ranked third in school history with 174 receptions for 2,350 yards and 16 touchdowns.

== Professional career ==
Pre-draft measurables
Height	Weight	Arm length	Hand span	Wingspan	40-yard dash	10-yard split	20-yard split	20-yard shuttle	Three-cone drill	Vertical jump	Broad jump	Bench press
5 ft 11 5/8 in (1.82 m)	198 lb (90 kg)	32 5/8 in (0.83 m)	10 1/2 in (0.27 m)	6 ft 6 3/4 in (2.00 m)	4.45 s	1.43 s	2.57 s	4.34 s	6.94 s	36.0 in (0.91 m)	10 ft 9 in (3.28 m)	15 reps
All values from NFL Combine

=== 2016 ===
Mitchell was selected by the New England Patriots in the fourth round (112th overall) of the 2016 NFL draft. He was the 11th wide receiver selected.

External videos
- Patriots select Mitchell 112th overall

On May 5, 2016, the New England Patriots signed him to a four-year, $2.91 million rookie contract that included a signing bonus of $577,992.

Head coach Bill Belichick named Mitchell the starting wide receiver, alongside veteran Julian Edelman.

Mitchell made his professional regular season debut and first career start in the Patriots' season-opener against the Arizona Cardinals and caught two passes for 33 yards from Jimmy Garoppolo. On November 20, 2016, Mitchell caught his first career touchdown reception from Tom Brady, a 56-yard score in a victory over the San Francisco 49ers. He finished the game with four catches for 98 yards, and one touchdown. A week later, at the New York Jets, Mitchell had his first two-touchdown game, catching five passes for 42 yards and two touchdowns. On December 4, 2016, Mitchell caught a season-high eight passes for 82 yards in a 26–10 victory over the Los Angeles Rams. Mitchell finished his rookie season with 32 receptions for 401 yards and four touchdowns in 14 games and six starts.

On February 5, 2017, Mitchell was part of the Patriots team that won Super Bowl LI. In the game, he caught six passes for 70 yards as the Patriots defeated the Atlanta Falcons by a score of 34–28 in overtime. He caught all five targets from Brady in the pivotal fourth quarter, and converted four of those five receptions into first downs.

=== 2017 ===
On September 7, 2017, Mitchell was placed on injured reserve due to a knee injury. With Mitchell not playing the whole season, the Patriots reached Super Bowl LII, but lost 41–33 to the Philadelphia Eagles.

=== 2018 ===
Throughout the offseason, Mitchell continued to struggle with his troublesome injured knee, ultimately undergoing a procedure in July. On August 6, 2018, Mitchell was waived by the Patriots.

On March 23, 2019, Mitchell announced his retirement, citing continued knee issues.

== Writing career ==
Mitchell was not a strong reader when he began college and read at a middle-school level. He later developed an interest in reading, joined a women's reading club, and promoted literacy among youth. He has said that he is more proud of his progress in reading than of playing in and later winning the Super Bowl.

In 2016, Mitchell released his first book, The Magician's Hat. This children's picture book features David, the Magician, who loves to perform magic. David knows the magical power of books, which can explore dreams and develop creativity.

After he ended his career in the NFL in 2019, he started reading to children with children's books, which include some of his own.

=== Bibliography ===
- The Magician's Hat (illustrated by Joanne Lew-Vriethoff) (2016)
- My Very Favorite Book in the Whole Wide World (illustrated by Michael Robertson) (2020)
- Hey, Georgia (illustrated by Chandler Fowler) (2022)
- My Super Duper Me (illustrated by Deise Lino) (2026)
