= James J. Hardy =

American politician

James J. Hardy was an African-American member of the South Carolina legislature from 1870 to 1871.

His son Walter S. E. Hardy became a doctor. He applied to the University of Tennessee in 1939. Dr. Walter Hardy Memorial Park and the Dr. Walter S. E. Hardy Scholarship are named for him.
