= Woodrow Hamilton =

American football player (born 1992)

No. 74, 96, 78
- Position: Nose tackle

Personal information
- Born: December 20, 1992 (age 33); Raleigh, Mississippi, U.S.
- Listed height: 6 ft 3 in (1.91 m)
- Listed weight: 315 lb (143 kg)

Career information
- High school: Raleigh
- College: Ole Miss
- NFL draft: 2016: undrafted

Career history
- New England Patriots (2016); New Orleans Saints (2017–2018); New York Giants (2018)*; Carolina Panthers (2019–2020); Tennessee Titans (2021); New York Giants (2021)
- * Offseason or practice squad member only

Awards and highlights
- Super Bowl champion (LI)

Career NFL statistics
- Total tackles: 8
- Fumble recoveries: 1
- Stats at Pro Football Reference

Woodrow Hamilton (born December 20, 1992) is an American former professional football player who was a nose tackle in the National Football League (NFL). He played college football for the Ole Miss Rebels.

== College career ==
Hamilton played in 47 games with 25 starts at nose tackle and finished with 83 tackles and three sacks and one pass defensed for Mississippi. As a senior, he started all 12 games and totaled 29 tackles and one sack.

== Professional career ==
=== New England Patriots ===
Hamilton was signed by the New England Patriots as an undrafted free agent following the 2016 NFL draft. On September 3, 2016, he was released by the Patriots as part of final roster cuts and was signed to the practice squad the next day. He was promoted to the active roster on October 8, 2016. On December 21, he was released by the Patriots and was re-signed to the practice squad. On February 5, 2017, Hamilton's Patriots appeared in Super Bowl LI. In the game, the Patriots defeated the Atlanta Falcons by a score of 34–28 in overtime.

On February 7, 2017, Hamilton signed a futures contract with the Patriots. On September 2, 2017, Hamilton was waived/injured by the Patriots and placed on injured reserve. He was released with an injury settlement on September 4.

=== New Orleans Saints ===
On October 10, 2017, Hamilton was signed to the New Orleans Saints' practice squad. He was promoted to the active roster on January 10, 2018.

On September 1, 2018, Hamilton was waived by the Saints and was signed to the practice squad the next day. He was released on September 27, 2018.

=== New York Giants (first stint) ===
On December 12, 2018, Hamilton was signed to the New York Giants practice squad.

=== Carolina Panthers ===
On December 31, 2018, Hamilton signed a reserve/future contract with the Carolina Panthers. He was waived during final roster cuts on August 30, 2019. He was re-signed to the active roster on November 27, 2019.

On September 5, 2020, Hamilton was waived by the Panthers and signed to the practice squad the next day. He was elevated to the active roster on September 19 for the team's week 2 game against the Tampa Bay Buccaneers, and recovered a fumble in the game. He reverted to the practice squad after the game. He was signed to the active roster on October 17. He was waived on November 7, 2020. Hamilton re-signed to the practice squad on November 10. On December 12, 2020, Hamilton was signed to the active roster. He was released on February 12, 2021.

=== Tennessee Titans ===
Hamilton signed with the Tennessee Titans on April 23, 2021. He was waived on August 31, 2021, and re-signed to the practice squad. He was signed to the active roster on October 1, 2021. He was waived on October 12.

=== New York Giants (second stint) ===
On October 20, 2021, Hamilton was signed to the New York Giants practice squad. He was released on October 26. He was re-signed on December 14. His contract expired when the teams season ended on January 9, 2022.
