= James Hardy (American football coach) =

American football coach (born 1981)

Personal information
- Born: December 5, 1981 (age 44); Danville, Virginia, U.S.

Career information
- High school: Lafayette
- College: Christopher Newport University / Auburn University

Career history
- Christopher Newport (2004–2005) Strength and conditioning coach; Auburn (2005–2006) Graduate assistant; Colorado (2006–2010) Assistant strength and conditioning coach; Colorado (2010–2015) Director of basketball strength and conditioning; New England Patriots (2015–2018) Assistant strength and conditioning coach

Awards and highlights
- Super Bowl champion (LI, LIII)

James Hardy (born December 5, 1981) is an American football coach.

Hardy coached at the collegiate level for over a decade before becoming part of the Patriots' staff in 2015 as an assistant strength and conditioning coach. On February 5, 2017, Hardy was part of the Patriots coaching staff that won Super Bowl LI. In the game, the Patriots defeated the Atlanta Falcons by a score of 34–28 in overtime.
