= Parry (surname) =

Parry is a surname of Welsh origin originally derived from shortening 'ap Harry' (Welsh for "son of Harry").

People with the name include:

- Adam Parry (1928–1971), American classical scholar
- Alan Parry (born c. 1947), British football and athletics commentator
- Albert Parry (1874–1950), Anglican Dean of St David's from 1940 to 1949
- Albert Parry (academic) (1901–1992), historian
- Ben Parry (musician), born 1965, British composer, conductor and singer
- Bill Parry (mathematician) (1934–2006), British mathematician
- Bill Parry (politician) (1878–1952), New Zealand politician
- Bruce Parry (born 1969), British TV presenter and adventurer
- Cecil Parry (1866–1901), English cricketer
- Charles Parry (disambiguation)
- Charles Christopher Parry (1823–1890), American botanist and mountaineer
- David Parry (disambiguation)
- Diane Parry (born 2002), French tennis player
- Dick Parry (1942–2026), English saxophonist
- Edward Parry (disambiguation)
- Frederic John Sidney Parry (1810–1885), English entomologist
- Hannah Gabrielle Parry (H. G. Parry), New Zealand writer and academic
- Harold Parry (1896–1917), English World War I poet
- Hubert Parry (1848–1918), British composer
- James Parry (disambiguation)
- John Parry (disambiguation)
- Joseph Parry (1841–1903), Welsh composer and musician
- Kevin Parry (disambiguation)
- Maurice Parry (1877–1935), Welsh footballer
- Mark Parry (footballer) (born 1970), Welsh footballer
- Mike Parry (born 1954), English journalist and radio presenter
- Mike Parry (politician) (born 1953), American politician
- Milman Parry (1902–1935), American scholar of epic poetry
- Paul Parry (born 1980), Welsh footballer
- Richard Parry (disambiguation)
- Rick Parry (born 1955), British former chief executive of Liverpool Football Club and former head of the FA Premier League
- Robert Parry (disambiguation)
- Stephen Parry (disambiguation)
- Thomas Parry (disambiguation)
- Thomas Gambier Parry (1816–1888), British artist and art collector
- Wilfred Parry (1908–1979), pianist and accompanist taught at Trinity College, London
- William Parry (disambiguation)

== Characters ==
- Will Parry (His Dark Materials), in the series His Dark Materials by Philip Pullman
  - Stanislaus Grumman a.k.a. Colonel John Parry, father of Will Parry
