= David Parry =

David Parry may refer to:

== Sports ==
- David Parry (American football) (born 1992), American football nose tackle
- David Parry (English cricketer) (born 1956), English cricketer
- David Parry (footballer) (1948–2024), footballer for Tranmere Rovers
- David Parry (Nevisian cricketer), Nevisian cricketer

== Musicians ==
- David Parry (folk musician) (1942–1995), Canadian folk musician
- David Parry (conductor) (born 1949), English conductor

== Others ==
- David Parry (biophysicist), New Zealand biophysicist
- David Parry (dialectologist) (1937–2022), British dialectologist
- David Parry (scholar) (c. 1682–1714), Welsh scholar and keeper of the Ashmolean Museum in Oxford
- David Hughes Parry (1893–1973), university administrator and professor of law
- David M. Parry (1852–1915), American industrialist and writer
- David Parry-Evans (1935–2020), British RAF Air Marshal
- David William Parry (born 1958), British pastor, poet, essayist and dramaturge
- Dave Parry (born 1964), sound and lighting designer
- David Henry Parry (1793–1826), British portrait painter

== See also ==
- David Parry-Jones (1933–2017), Welsh sports broadcaster and author
- David Perry (disambiguation)
- Parry (surname)
