= Jordan Richards (American football) =

American football player (born 1993)

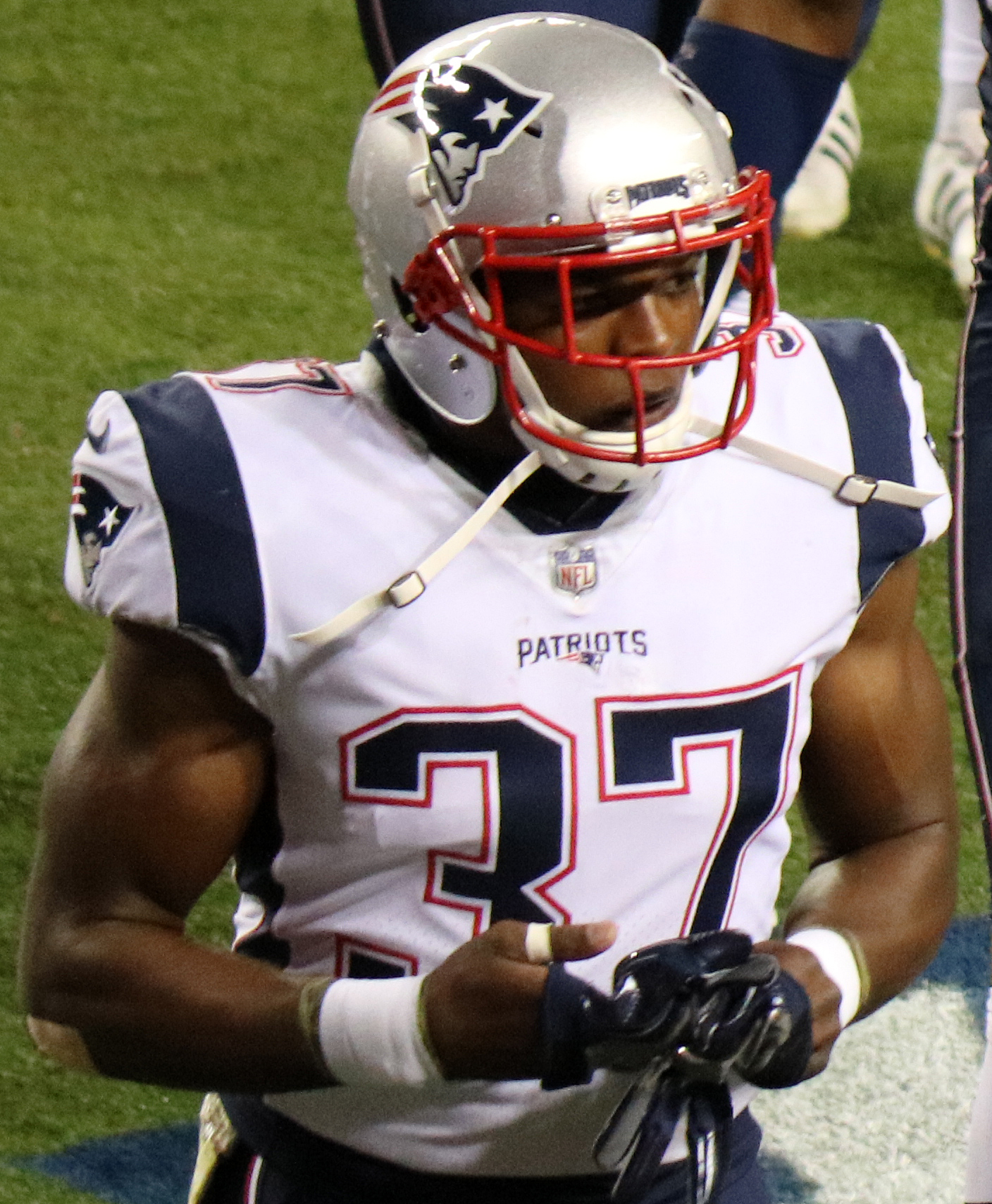
- Richards with the New England Patriots in 2017

No. 37, 29, 39, 28, 48
- Position: Safety

Personal information
- Born: January 21, 1993 (age 33); Folsom, California, U.S.
- Listed height: 5 ft 11 in (1.80 m)
- Listed weight: 210 lb (95 kg)

Career information
- High school: Folsom
- College: Stanford (2011–2014)
- NFL draft: 2015: 2nd round, 64th overall pick

Career history
- New England Patriots (2015–2017); Atlanta Falcons (2018); Oakland Raiders (2019)*; New England Patriots (2019); Baltimore Ravens (2019–2021)
- * Offseason or practice squad member only

Awards and highlights
- Super Bowl champion (LI); First-team All-Pac-12 (2014)

Career NFL statistics
- Total tackles: 102
- Forced fumbles: 2
- Fumble recoveries: 2
- Pass deflections: 6
- Defensive touchdowns: 1
- Stats at Pro Football Reference

Jordan Hugh Richards (born January 21, 1993) is an American former professional football player who was a safety in the National Football League (NFL). He played college football for the Stanford Cardinal and was selected by the New England Patriots in the second round of the 2015 NFL draft.

== College career ==
Richards played college football at Stanford University, where he was a team captain and first-team All-Pac-12 Conference player during his final senior collegiate year with the Cardinal. Although recruited as one top the top 100 receivers in the country, he was switched to defense and played all 13 games as a true freshman.

== Professional career ==
=== Pre-draft ===
Richards accepted an invitation to play in the 2015 East–West Shrine Game and practiced well throughout the week leading up to the game. He played for the West team under former Seattle Seahawks quarterback and Washington Redskins head coach Jim Zorn. Richards recorded three combined tackles, as the West lost 19–3 to the East. He attended the NFL Combine and completed all of the required combine and positional drills. Richards lackluster performances in the 40-yard dash, vertical jump, and broad jump was thought to negatively effect his stock. His time in the three-cone drill finished in the top five amongst all safeties at the combine. On March 19, 2015, Richards opted to participate at Stanford's pro day, along with James Vaughters, Ty Montgomery, Andrus Peat, Lee Ward, A. J. Tarpley, Alex Carter, Henry Anderson, David Parry, and five others. Over 75 team representatives and scouts from every NFL team attended as Richards decided to redo his vertical jump (34 1/2 in or 880 mm), broad jump (9 ft 0 in or 2.74 m), 40-yard dash (4.59), 20-yard dash (2.64), 10-yard dash (1.58), and short shuttle (4.32). He performed well and was able to get better times and lengths in everything but the broad jump and short shuttle. His positional drills were led by the New England Patriots' director of player personnel Nick Caserio. At the conclusion of the pre-draft process, Richards projected to be a fifth- to seventh-round pick by the majority of NFL draft experts and analysts. His fall from a prospective third-round pick was mostly due to his lack of preferred athletic ability and his mediocre performance at the combine. He was ranked as the seventh-best strong safety prospect in the draft by NFLDraftScout.com and was ranked the 23rd-best safety in the draft by NFL analyst Charles Davis.

Pre-draft measurables
Height	Weight	Arm length	Hand span	40-yard dash	10-yard split	20-yard split	20-yard shuttle	Three-cone drill	Vertical jump	Broad jump	Bench press
5 ft 10 3/4 in (1.80 m)	211 lb (96 kg)	32 1/2 in (0.83 m)	9 3/8 in (0.24 m)	4.65 s	1.62 s	2.72 s	4.22 s	6.74 s	32 in (0.81 m)	9 ft 3 in (2.82 m)	13 reps
All values from NFL Combine

=== New England Patriots (first stint) ===
==== 2015 ====
The Patriots selected Richards in the second round (64th overall) of the 2015 NFL draft. Richards was the fourth safety selected in 2016, behind Damarious Randall (No. 30, Packers), Landon Collins (No. 33, Giants), and Jaquiski Tartt (No. 46, 49ers). His selection in the second round was heavily criticized by draft analysts and the media due to his draft projection being a fifth to seventh round pick and was partially due to the fact the team already had Devin McCourty and Patrick Chung as established starters at safety. Many journalists and analysts speculated his selection by Patriots' head coach/general manager Bill Belichick was due to his solid performance in the three-cone drill, his intelligence, and high football acumen. On May 8, 2015, the Patriots signed Richards to a four-year, $3.71 million contract with $1.15 million guaranteed and a signing bonus of $959,307.

Richards was not able to attend team activities held in the spring due to Stanford following the quarters semester system and the NFL's graduation rule that does not permit players that haven't completed or graduated from their school to attend team activities. Upon arriving at training camp, he competed with Nate Ebner, Tavon Wilson, Duron Harmon, and Brandon King for the role as a backup safety. Head coach Bill Belichick named Richards the backup strong safety behind Chung to start the regular season.

He made his professional regular season debut in the Patriots' season-opening 28–21 victory against the Pittsburgh Steelers. On September 27, 2015, Richards recorded two solo tackles and deflected a pass, as the Patriots routed the Jacksonville Jaguars. He made his first career regular season tackle on Jaguars' running back Corey Grant and stopped him after an eight-yard reception in the first quarter. Richards was a healthy scratch and was inactive for two games in Weeks 13–14. On December 20, 2015, Richards earned his first career start and recorded three solo tackles and defended a pass in a 33–16 defeat over the Tennessee Titans. He started at free safety after Devin McCourty was unable to play after sustaining an ankle injury the following week against the Houston Texans. The following week, he earned his second consecutive start at free safety and recorded a season-high seven combined tackles during their 26–20 loss at the New York Jets.

The Patriots finished atop the AFC East with a 12–4 record. On January 26, 2016, he played in the first career playoff game as the Patriots defeated the Kansas City Chiefs 27–20 to advance to the AFC Championship. They suffered a 20–18 loss in the AFC Championship to the eventual Super Bowl 50 Champions, the Denver Broncos.

Richards completed his rookie season with 20 combined tackles (16 solo) and two pass deflections in 14 games and two starts. He played in 21.8% of the Patriots' defensive snaps and 51.4% of all of their special teams play.

==== 2016 ====
Richards entered training camp competing for a job as the backup safety against Ebner, Harmon, King, Brock Vereen, Vinnie Sunseri, and Cedric Thompson. He was named the third strong safety on the depth chart behind Chung and Harmon to begin the 2016 season.

On November 27, 2016, Richards suffered a knee injury while covering a punt return in the Patriots' 22–17 victory over the Jets. The injury caused him to miss the next three games. He made three combined tackles (one solo) in 11 games and zero starts and was limited to special teams throughout the 2016 season.

The Patriots finished first in their division with a 14–2 record. On February 5, 2017, the Patriots appeared in Super Bowl LI and defeated the Atlanta Falcons in a 34–28 overtime victory. Richards was a healthy scratch for all three playoff games

==== 2017 ====
Richards started the Patriots' season-opener against the Chiefs and recorded six combined tackles and forced the first fumble of his career in a 42–27 loss. Richards started as a hybrid outside linebacker and was tasked with covering one of the Chiefs' tight ends in dime packages. He recorded twice as many tackles then he did the entire 2016 season and played 41 defensive snaps, well above his total of 16 snaps for 2016. During a Week 6 matchup against the Jets, Richards earned his second start of the season as a hybrid coverage linebacker and recorded three solo tackles in a 24–17 win for New England. Richards helped the Patriots reach Super Bowl LII, but lost 41–33 to the Philadelphia Eagles with Richards recording five tackles in the game.

=== Atlanta Falcons ===
On August 31, 2018, Richards was traded to the Falcons for a conditional 2020 seventh-round draft pick. He played in 15 games with 12 starts, recording 39 tackles and three passes defensed.

=== Oakland Raiders ===
On April 5, 2019, Richards signed with the Oakland Raiders on a one-year deal. He was released during final roster cuts on August 30, 2019.

=== New England Patriots (second stint) ===
On October 2, 2019, Richards was re-signed by the Patriots. He was released on October 22.

=== Baltimore Ravens ===
On October 24, 2019, Richards signed with the Baltimore Ravens. In Week 17 against the Pittsburgh Steelers, Richards recovered a punt fumbled by punter Jordan Berry in the end zone for a touchdown during the 28–10 win.

On February 13, 2020, Richards signed a one-year contract extension with the Ravens. He was released from the Ravens on September 5, 2020, and signed to the practice squad the next day. He was elevated to the active roster on September 12 for the team's Week 1 game against the Cleveland Browns, and reverted to the practice squad on September 14. He was elevated again on September 19 for the Week 2 game against the Houston Texans, and reverted to the practice squad again after the game. He was promoted to the active roster on September 28, 2020.

On January 30, 2021, Richards signed another one-year contract extension with the Ravens.

On August 23, 2021, Richards was released by the Ravens and re-signed to the practice squad on September 1, 2021. He was released on September 8, 2021. On September 28, 2021, Richards was re-signed with to the Ravens practice squad. He was released again on October 27, 2021. He was re-signed on November 8, 2021.

== NFL career statistics ==
Year	Team	GP	Comb	Solo	Ast	Sack	FF	FR	Yds	Int	Yds	Avg	Lng	TD	PD
2015	NE	14	20	16	4	0.0	1	0	0	0	0	0	0	0	2
2016	NE	11	3	1	2	0.0	0	0	0	0	0	0	0	0	0
2017	NE	16	22	20	2	0.0	1	0	0	0	0	0	0	0	1
2018	ATL	15	39	27	12	0.0	0	0	0	0	0	0	0	0	3
2019	BAL	12	5	0	1	0.0	0	0	0	0	0	0	0	0	0
2020	BAL	16	3	0	1	0.0	0	0	0	0	0	0	0	0	0
2021	BAL	2	2	0	2	0.0	0	0	0	0	0	0	0	0	0
Career		86	94	64	24	0.0	2	0	0	0	0	0	0	0	6

== Personal life ==
Richards is a Folsom High School alumnus along with many other professional sports players. His father, Terry, a native of Natick, Massachusetts, played football at Tufts University from 1975–1979 as a defensive lineman. Richards majored in public policy at Stanford.
