= 2015 East–West Shrine Game =

- All–Star Bowl Game
| East Team | West Team |
| 19 | 3 |
| Head coach: Mike Singletary | Head coach: Jim Zorn |
| | 1 | 2 | 3 | 4 | Total |
|---|---|---|---|---|---|
| East | 3 | 6 | 0 | 10 | 19 |
| West | 0 | 0 | 0 | 3 | 3 |
- Date: January 17, 2015
- Season: 2014
- Stadium: Tropicana Field
- Location: St. Petersburg, Florida
- MVP: Marvin Kloss (K, South Florida) & Za'Darius Smith (DE, Kentucky)
- Attendance: 22,296

United States TV coverage
- Network: NFL Network

The 2015 East–West Shrine Game, the 90th staging of the all-star college football exhibition, was held on January 17, 2015, at 4:00 p.m. EST, and featured NCAA Division I Football Bowl Subdivision players and a few select invitees from Canadian university football. The game featured more than 100 players from the 2014 NCAA Division I FBS football season and prospects for the 2015 draft of the professional National Football League (NFL). In the week prior to the game, scouts from all 32 NFL teams attended. The game was held in St. Petersburg, Florida, at Tropicana Field, and benefits Shriners Hospitals for Children. The game was broadcast on the NFL Network.

The East–West Shrine Game Pat Tillman Award was given to Jake Ryan (LB, Michigan); the award "is presented to a player who best exemplifies character, intelligence, sportsmanship and service. The award is about a student-athlete's achievements and conduct, both on and off the field."

== Players ==
Full roster is available here.

=== East Team ===
==== Offense ====
| No. | Name | Position | School |
|---|---|---|---|
| 1 | Andre Davis | WR | South Florida |
| 3 | Tre McBride | WR | William & Mary |
| 6 | Hutson Mason | QB | Georgia |
| 7 | Anthony Boone | QB | Duke |
| 9 | Deon Long | OT | Maryland |
| 10 | Dominique Brown | RB | Louisville |
| 13 | Wes Saxton | TE | South Alabama |
| 14 | Taylor Heinicke | QB | Old Dominion |
| 15 | Terrence Magee | RB | LSU |
| 18 | Gerald Christian (INJ) | TE | Louisville |
| 18 | Khari Lee | TE | Bowie State |
| 25 | Keith Mumphery | WR | Michigan State |
| 26 | Larry Dixon | FB | Army |
| 27 | Kenny Hilliard | RB | LSU |
| 60 | Sean Hickey | OL | Syracuse |
| 61 | David Andrews | OL | Georgia |
| 62 | Shane McDermott | OL | Miami (FL) |
| 63 | Dillon Day | OL | Mississippi State |
| 64 | Mark Glowinski | OL | West Virginia |
| 66 | Ben Beckwith | OL | Mississippi State |
| 70 | John Miller | OL | Louisville |
| 76 | Jon Feliciano | OL | Miami (FL) |
| 77 | Darrian Miller | OL | Kentucky |
| 79 | Jamon Brown | OL | Louisville |
| 88 | Darren Waller | WR | Georgia Tech |
| 98 | Devin Gardner | WR | Michigan |

==== Defense ====
| No. | Name | Position | School |
|---|---|---|---|
| 2 | Parrish Gaines | S | Navy |
| 5 | Damian Swann | CB | Georgia |
| 8 | Amarlo Herrera | LB | Georgia |
| 11 | B. J. Dubose | DL | Louisville |
| 16 | Dean Marlowe | S | James Madison |
| 17 | Damian Parms | S | Florida Atlantic |
| 19 | Cam Thomas | CB | Western Kentucky |
| 21 | Justin Coleman | CB | Tennessee |
| 23 | Tye Smith | CB | Towson |
| 24 | Ronald Martin | S | LSU |
| 28 | Detrick Bonner | S | Virginia Tech |
| 30 | Edmond Robinson | LB | Newberry |
| 35 | Craig Mager | CB | Texas State |
| 39 | Jake Ryan | LB | Michigan |
| 47 | Cole Farrand | LB | Maryland |
| 48 | Deiontrez Mount | LB | Louisville |
| 54 | Quayshawn Nealy | LB | Georgia Tech |
| 58 | Leterrius Walton | DL | Central Michigan |
| 59 | Jermauria Rasco | DL | LSU |
| 90 | Davis Tull | DL | Tennessee-Chattanooga |
| 91 | Derrick Lott | DL | Tennessee-Chattanooga |
| 94 | Za'Darius Smith | DL | Kentucky |
| 95 | Anthony Chickillo | DL | Miami (FL) |
| 97 | Darius Kilgo | DL | Maryland |
| 99 | Daryl Waud | DL | Western Ontario |

==== Specialists ====
| No. | Name | Position | School |
|---|---|---|---|
| 37 | Marvin Kloss | K | South Florida |
| 36 | Spencer Roth | P | Baylor |

=== West Team ===
==== Offense ====
| No. | Name | Position | School |
|---|---|---|---|
| 2 | Kasen Williams | WR | Washington |
| 3 | Ezell Ruffin | WR | San Diego State |
| 10 | Taylor Kelly | QB | Arizona State |
| 11 | Dylan Thompson | QB | South Carolina |
| 12 | Jordan Taylor | WR | Rice |
| 17 | Cody Fajardo | QB | Nevada |
| 23 | John Crockett | RB | North Dakota State |
| 28 | Malcolm Brown | RB | Texas |
| 29 | Austin Hill | WR | Arizona |
| 31 | Zach Zenner | RB | South Dakota State |
| 48 | Aaron Ripkowski | FB | Oklahoma |
| 52 | Cameron Clemmons | OL | Western Kentucky |
| 54 | Collin Rahrig | OL | Indiana |
| 66 | Brandon Vitabile | OL | Northwestern |
| 68 | Mickey Baucus | OL | Arizona |
| 69 | Tayo Fabuluje | OL | TCU |
| 72 | B. J. Finney | OL | Kansas State |
| 73 | Adam Shead | OL | Oklahoma |
| 74 | Bobby Hart | OL | Florida State |
| 74 | Miles Dieffenbach (INJ) | OL | Penn State |
| 75 | Gregory Mancz | OL | Toledo |
| 79 | Terry Poole | OL | San Diego State |
| 80 | Blake Bell | TE | Oklahoma |
| 81 | Da'Ron Brown | WR | Northern Illinois |
| 85 | MyCole Pruitt | TE | Southern Illinois |
| 85 | A. J. Derby (INJ) | TE | Arkansas |
| 88 | Addison Richards | WR | Regina |

==== Defense ====
| No. | Name | Position | School |
|---|---|---|---|
| 1 | Samuel Carter | S | TCU |
| 5 | Martin Ifedi | DL | Memphis |
| 6 | Corey Cooper | S | Nebraska |
| 7 | Tevin McDonald | S | Eastern Washington |
| 15 | Fritz Etienne | S | Memphis |
| 16 | Josh Shaw | CB | USC |
| 18 | A. J. Tarpley | LB | Stanford |
| 19 | Tony Washington | LB | Oregon |
| 20 | Greg Henderson | CB | Colorado |
| 21 | Bernard Blake | CB | Colorado State |
| 22 | Bobby McCain | CB | Memphis |
| 26 | Bryce Callahan | CB | Rice |
| 27 | Jordan Richards | S | Stanford |
| 34 | Taiwan Jones | LB | Michigan State |
| 41 | Ben Heeney | LB | Kansas |
| 44 | Bryce Hager | LB | Baylor |
| 51 | Zach Vigil | LB | Utah State |
| 53 | Kyle Emanuel | DL | North Dakota State |
| 55 | James Vaughters | LB | Stanford |
| 58 | David Parry | DL | Stanford |
| 91 | James Castleman | DL | Oklahoma State |
| 92 | Tyeler Davison | DL | Fresno State |
| 93 | Travis Raciti | DL | San Jose State |
| 96 | Chucky Hunter | DL | TCU |
| 98 | Xavier Williams | DL | Northern Iowa |
| 99 | Ryan Russell | DL | Purdue |

==== Specialists ====
| No. | Name | Position | School |
|---|---|---|---|
| 8 | Darragh O'Neill | P | Colorado |
| 32 | Niklas Sade | K | North Carolina State |

== Game summary ==
=== Scoring summary ===
Scoring summary

| Quarter | Time | Drive | | | Team | Scoring information | Score | |
| Quarter | Time | Plays | Yards | TOP | Team | Scoring information | East | West |
|---|---|---|---|---|---|---|---|---|
| 1 | 8:05 | 14 | 58 | 6:55 | East | 39-yard field goal by Marvin Kloss | 3 | 0 |
| 2 | 4:43 | 7 | 9 | 3:22 | East | 30-yard field goal by Marvin Kloss | 6 | 0 |
| 2 | 0:19 | 10 | 23 | 3:20 | East | 47-yard field goal by Marvin Kloss | 9 | 0 |
| 4 | 11:31 | 14 | 48 | 7:42 | West | 51-yard field goal by Niklas Sade | 9 | 3 |
| 4 | 4:33 | 10 | 78 | 6:58 | East | 19-yard field goal by Marvin Kloss | 12 | 3 |
| 4 | 0:27 | 6 | 28 | 3:49 | East | Dominique Brown 1-yard touchdown run, Marvin Kloss kick good | 19 | 3 |
| "TOP" = time of possession. For other American football terms, see Glossary of American football. | | | | | | | 19 | 3 |

=== Statistics ===
| Statistics | East | West |
|---|---|---|
| First downs | 15 | 7 |
| Total offense, plays - yards | 61-260 | 43-93 |
| Rushes-yards (net) | 36-126 | 18-42 |
| Passing yards (net) | 134 | 51 |
| Passes, Comp-Att-Int | 13-25-1 | 10-25-2 |
| Time of Possession | 35:22 | 24:38 |

== Notes ==
- Former players Jim Hanifan (1955 game) and Tommie Frazier (1996 game) were selected for the East–West Shrine Game Hall of Fame.
