= Okeden (surname) =

Okeden is a surname and occasional given name, often combined with Parry, with or without hyphen. Notable people with this surname include:

- Blair Parry-Okeden (born 1950), American-born Australian billionaire heiress
- Caroline Okeden (1821–1903), British novelist
- William Okeden (1662–1718), British politician
- William Parry-Okeden (1841–1926), Australian public servant and police commissioner
- Ronald Okeden Alexander (1888–1949), officer in the Canadian army

== See also ==
- Okeden, Queensland
