= James Perry =

James Perry may refer to:

- James Perry (journalist) (1756–1821), British journalist and newspaper editor
- James Franklin Perry (1790–1853), early Texas settler (with wife Emily Austin Perry)
- Jimmy Perry (1923–2016), English actor and scriptwriter
- James E. C. Perry (born 1944), jurist
- James Stewart Perry (born 1947), sculptor
- James L. Perry (born 1948), academic
- James Perry, strongman, see 1992 World's Strongest Man
- James Lewis Perry (born 1979), cyclist
- James M. Perry (1927–2016), American journalist and author
- James M. Perry (lawyer) (1894–1964), South Carolina's first female lawyer
- James Perry (American football), American football coach and player
- James Perry (luthier), Irish luthier
- Jim Perry (television personality) (1933–2015), television personality and game show host
- Jim Perry (baseball) (born 1935), baseball player
- Jim Perry (politician) (born c. 1972), member of the North Carolina State Senate
- Rick Perry (James Richard Perry, born 1950), American politician

== See also ==
- James De Wolf Perry (1871–1947), bishop
- James Perry House, historic house in Rehoboth, Massachusetts
- James Parry (disambiguation), a list of people
