= David Perry =

David Perry may refer to:

- David Perry (game developer) (born 1967), Northern Irish game developer of such games as Earthworm Jim
- David Perry (Australian filmmaker) (1933–2015), Australian filmmaker
- David Perry (cricketer) (1929–2007), New Zealand cricketer
- David Perry (rugby union) (1937–2017), England international rugby union player and captain
- Dave Perry (born 1966), creator of TV computer game shows
- David Perry (barrister), senior English barrister
- David Perry (politician) (born 1952), American state legislator in West Virginia
- David Perry (entrepreneur), president, CEO and director of Indigo Agriculture
- David Perry (civil servant) (1931–2025), English civil servant and engineer
- Dave Perry (law enforcement), Canadian private investigator
- David Perry, San Franciscan media relations businessman, founder of Rainbow Honor Walk
- David Perry, also known as the Norwich Puppet Man
- Dave Perry (runner), winner of the 1965 4 × 880 yard relay at the NCAA Division I Indoor Track and Field Championships

== See also ==
- David Parry (disambiguation)
- Perry (disambiguation)
