= A. J. Derby =

American football player (born 1991)

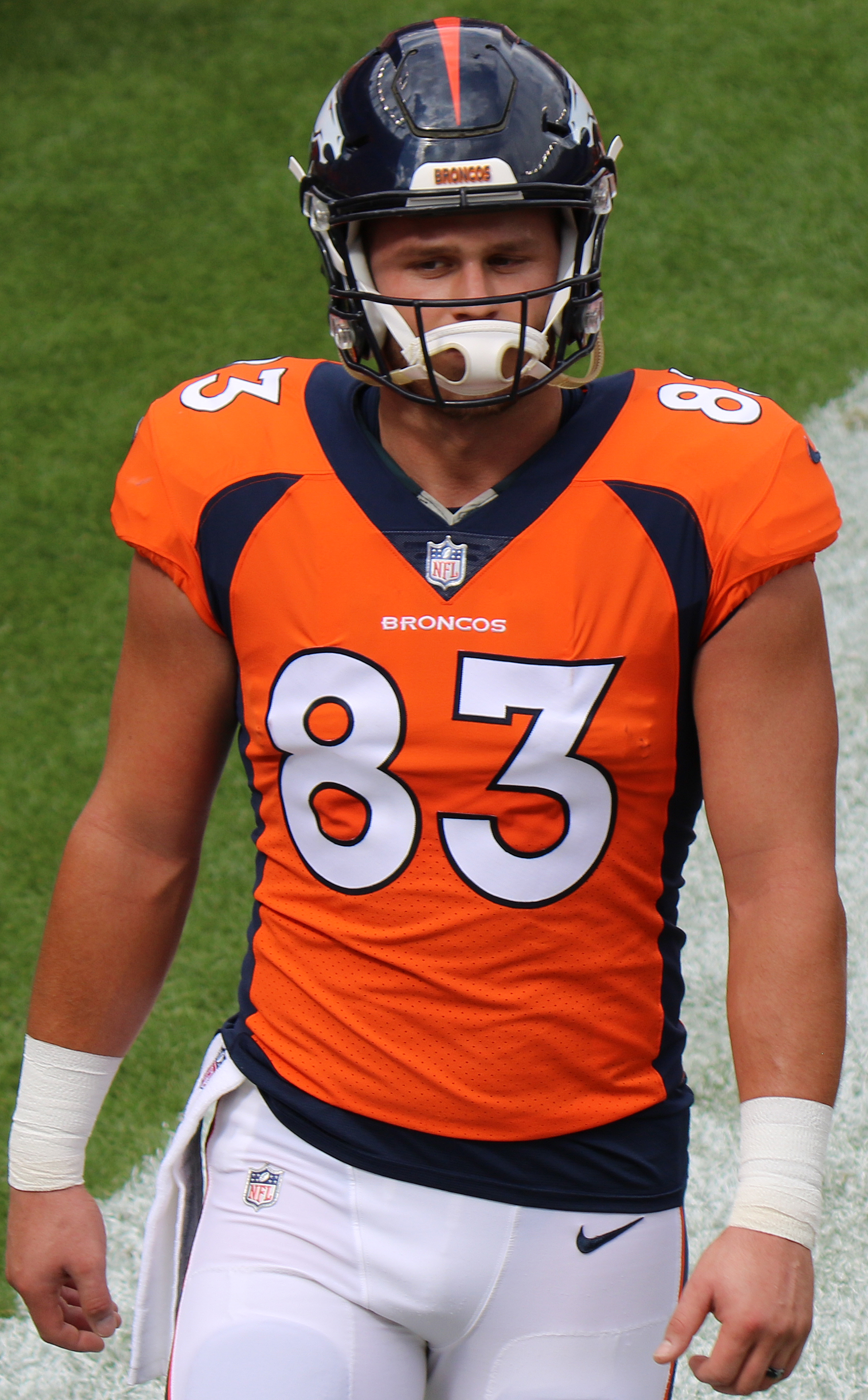
- Derby with the Denver Broncos in 2017

No. 86, 83, 85
- Position: Tight end

Personal information
- Born: September 20, 1991 (age 35); Iowa City, Iowa, U.S.
- Listed height: 6 ft 5 in (1.96 m)
- Listed weight: 240 lb (109 kg)

Career information
- High school: Iowa City
- College: Iowa (2010–2011); Coffeyville (2012); Arkansas (2013–2014)
- NFL draft: 2015: 6th round, 202nd overall pick

Career history
- New England Patriots (2015–2016); Denver Broncos (2016–2017); Miami Dolphins (2017–2018); New Orleans Saints (2019)*
- * Offseason or practice squad member only

Career NFL statistics
- Receptions: 40
- Receiving yards: 452
- Receiving touchdowns: 3
- Stats at Pro Football Reference

Alexander John Derby (born September 20, 1991) is an American former professional football player who was a tight end in the National Football League (NFL). He played college football for the Iowa Hawkeyes (2010–11), Coffeyville Community College (2012), and Arkansas Razorbacks (2013–14).

== College career ==
Derby started his collegiate career at Iowa, where, after redshirting his freshman year, he was a backup quarterback in 2011. He appeared in nine games and completed three passes for 30 yards.

Before his sophomore year, he transferred to Coffeyville Community College, where he finished the year throwing for 1,936 yards and 22 touchdowns, leading his team to Region IV semifinals.

Before his junior year, he transferred again, to play at Arkansas, where he was a backup quarterback again. He started one game during the year, finishing the year throwing for 178 yards and one touchdown. Before his senior year, he was converted to tight end. Derby played in 11 games with 7 starts at tight end before missing the last two games due to a knee injury. He finished the year with 22 catches for 303 yards and three touchdowns.

== Professional career ==
=== Pre-draft ===
On November 30, 2014, it was announced that Derby had accepted his invitation to play in the 2015 East–West Shrine Game. Unfortunately, Derby was unable to play in the East–West Shrine Game after suffering a knee injury. He was one of 19 collegiate tight ends to attend the NFL Scouting Combine in Indianapolis, Indiana. Derby was limited to performing the bench press due to his knee injury and successfully had 15 reps, placing him 13th among tight ends, only ahead of Oklahoma's Blake Bell. On March 4, 2015, Derby attended Arkansas' pro day, along with Trey Flowers, Darius Philon, Martrell Spaight, and 13 other prospects. He was able to perform all of the combine drills he skipped at the combine and was said to have had a good workout overall by NFL analyst Gil Brandt. Derby also performed positional drills and caught the ball well in front of team representatives and scouts from 28 NFL teams. At the conclusion of the pre-draft process, Derby was projected to be a seventh round pick or priority undrafted free agent by NFL draft experts and scouts. He was ranked the 17th best tight end prospect in the draft by NFLDraftScout.com.

Pre-draft measurables
Height	Weight	Arm length	Hand span	40-yard dash	10-yard split	20-yard split	20-yard shuttle	Three-cone drill	Bench press
6 ft 4 in (1.93 m)	255 lb (116 kg)	30 1/2 in (0.77 m)	9 1/2 in (0.24 m)	4.72 s	1.68 s	2.72 s	4.51 s	6.99 s	15 reps
All values from NFL Combine

=== New England Patriots ===
==== 2015 season ====
The New England Patriots selected Derby in the sixth round (202nd overall) of the 2015 NFL draft. He was the 13th tight end selected in 2015. On May 8, 2015, the Patriots signed Derby to a four-year, $2.39 million contract with a signing bonus of $112,005. After missing spring training, he entered training camp and joined in an open competition for the job as the second tight end, competing against Michael Hoomanawanui, Scott Chandler, Jake Bequette, and Jimmay Mundine. On August 5, 2015, he was placed on injured reserve after clearing waivers.

==== 2016 season ====
In 2016, Derby competed with Clay Harbor, Bryce Williams, and Steven Scheu in training camp to be the Patriots' third tight end. Unfortunately, head coach Bill Belichick named Derby the Patriots' fourth tight end behind Rob Gronkowski, Martellus Bennett, and Harbor. He made his professional debut in the Patriots' season-opening 23–21 victory at the Arizona Cardinals. He was a healthy scratch for four games during the season (Weeks 2–3, 7–8).

=== Denver Broncos ===
==== 2016 ====
On October 25, 2016, Derby was traded to the Denver Broncos for a fifth-round draft pick (163rd overall) in the 2017 NFL draft. The selection was later dealt to the Buffalo Bills as compensation for the Patriots to sign Mike Gillislee.

Upon arriving in Denver, head coach Gary Kubiak named Derby the Broncos' fourth tight end on their depth chart, behind Virgil Green, Jeff Heuerman, and John Phillips.

On November 6, 2016, Derby earned his first career start during a 30–20 loss to the Oakland Raiders The next week, Derby caught two passes for 22-yards in the Broncos' 25–23 victory over the New Orleans Saints. He made his first career reception on a ten-yard pass by quarterback Trevor Siemian. On December 11, 2016, Derby made a season-high five receptions for 57 receiving yards, however his fumble on the final drive cost Denver during a 13–10 loss at the Tennessee Titans. The next week, he caught four passes for 35-yards against his former team, the Patriots, during their 16–3 loss. He left the game after suffering a concussion and missed inactive for the last two games of the season. He finished the season with 16 receptions in 160 receiving yards in three starts and ten games.

==== 2017 ====
Throughout training camp with the Broncos, Derby competed against Green, Heuerman, Henry Krieger-Coble, Scheu, and Austin Traylor for the job as the starting tight end. New head coach Vance Joseph named Derby the third tight end the Broncos' depth chart, behind Virgil Green and Jeff Heuerman.

He played in the Broncos' season-opener against the Los Angeles Chargers and caught three passes for 34-yards during their 24–21 victory. On October 1, 2017, Derby made four receptions for 75 receiving yards and scored the first touchdown of his career in Denver's 16–10 win against the Raiders. His first career touchdown reception came in the first quarter on a 22-yard pass by Trevor Siemian. On October 22, 2017, he caught a career-high six passes for 66-yards in a 21–0 loss to the Los Angeles Chargers. The next week, Derby made two receptions for 21-yards and caught an 11-yard touchdown reception in a 29–19 loss at the Kansas City Chiefs.

On November 18, 2017, Derby was waived/injured by the Broncos with a shoulder injury and was placed on injured reserve. He was released with an injury settlement on November 28, 2017.

=== Miami Dolphins ===
On November 29, 2017, Derby was claimed off waivers by the Miami Dolphins. Upon arrival, head coach Adam Gase named Derby the fourth tight end on the Dolphins' depth chart, behind Julius Thomas, Anthony Fasano, and MarQueis Gray. On December 24, 2017, Derby made his Dolphins' debut after Julius Thomas was place on injured reserve. He caught one pass for 11-yards in the Dolphins' 29–13 loss at the Chiefs.

On December 4, 2018, Derby was placed on injured reserve with a foot injury.

=== New Orleans Saints ===
On August 7, 2019, Derby was signed by the Saints. He was released during final roster cuts on August 30, 2019.
