= Jake Ryan (American football) =

American football player (born 1992)

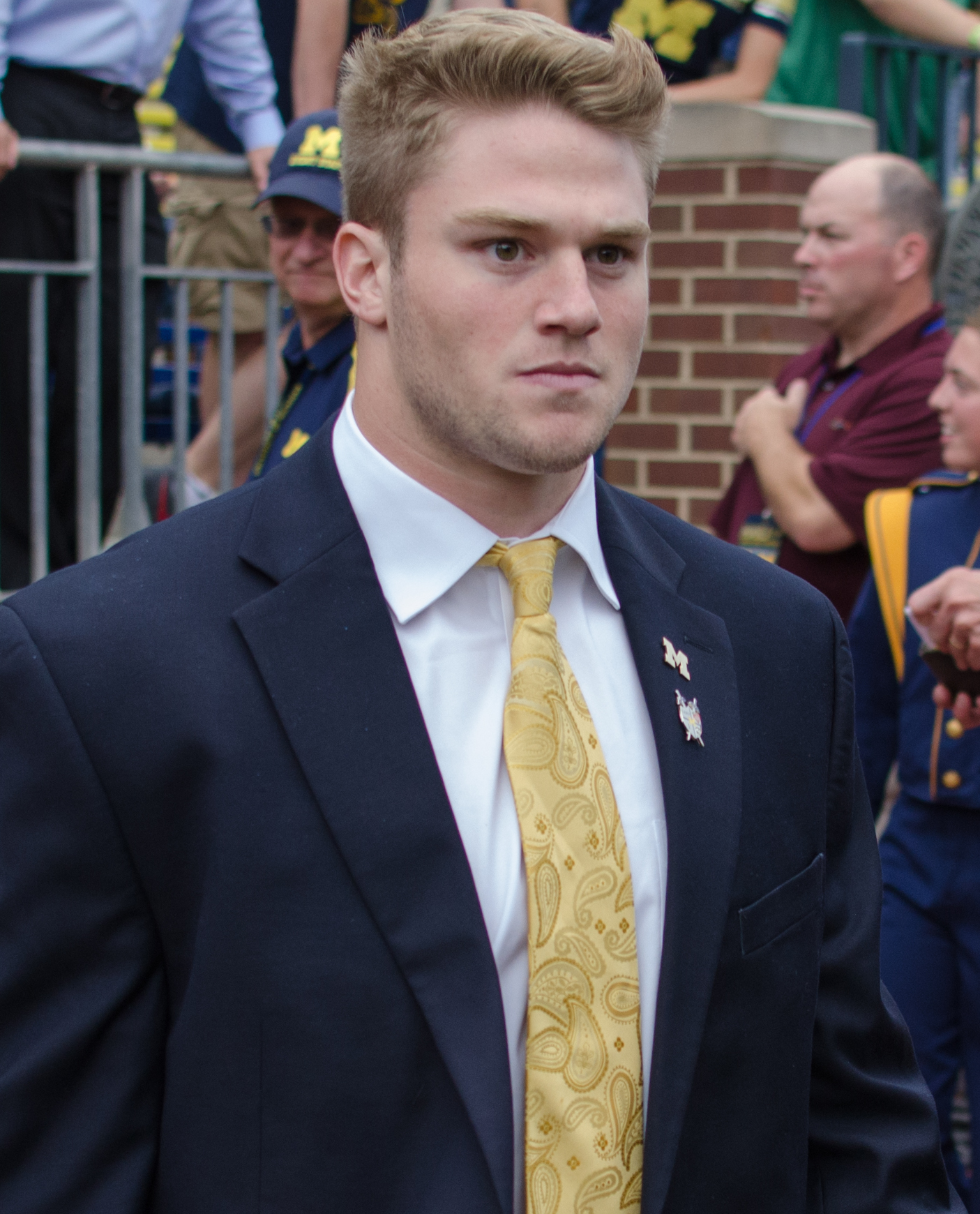
- Ryan in 2013

No. 47
- Position: Linebacker

Personal information
- Born: February 27, 1992 (age 34); Fairview Park, Ohio, U.S.
- Listed height: 6 ft 2 in (1.88 m)
- Listed weight: 240 lb (109 kg)

Career information
- High school: St. Ignatius (Cleveland, Ohio)
- College: Michigan (2010–2014)
- NFL draft: 2015: 4th round, 129th overall pick

Career history
- Green Bay Packers (2015–2018); Jacksonville Jaguars (2019); Baltimore Ravens (2020)*
- * Offseason or practice squad member only

Awards and highlights
- First-team All-Big Ten (2014); Second-team All-Big Ten (2012)

Career NFL statistics
- Total tackles: 213
- Sacks: 1.0
- Pass deflections: 3
- Forced fumbles: 1
- Stats at Pro Football Reference

Jacob William Ryan (born February 27, 1992) is an American former professional football player who was a linebacker in the National Football League (NFL). He played college football for the Michigan Wolverines. He was selected by the Green Bay Packers in the fourth round of the 2015 NFL draft.

== Early life ==
In high school, Ryan was rated as the 30th best high school football inside linebacker in the country by Rivals.com. He was rated as the 60th and 81st best outside linebacker in the national class of 2010 by ESPN.com and Scout.com, respectively. He was regarded as the 34th best player in the state of Ohio by Rivals. Ryan was a participant in the Ohio North–South All-Star game. He recovered the onside kick to secure the Ohio High School Athletic Association (OHSAA) championship as a junior. Ryan had offers from Ball State, Toledo and a number of other Mid-American Conference, but he grew 2 inches (5.08 cm) and 20 pounds (9.1 kg) prior to his senior year. Since Saint Ignatius High School has many Michigan Wolverine alumni, Ryan suspects that sudden late interest from Michigan was prompted by one of them.

College recruiting
Name	Hometown	School	Height	Weight	40^{‡}	Commit date
Jake Ryan; LB	Westlake, Ohio	Saint Ignatius High (OH)	6 ft 3 in (1.91 m)	220 lb (100 kg)	4.6	Jan 18, 2010
Jake Ryan; LB	Recruit ratings: Scout: Rivals: (77)					
Overall recruit ranking: Scout: 81 (OLB) Rivals: 30 (ILB), 34 (OH) ESPN: 60 (OLB)
Note: In many cases, Scout, Rivals, 247Sports, On3, and ESPN may conflict in their listings of height and weight.; In these cases, the average was taken. ESPN grades are on a 100-point scale.; Sources: "Michigan Football Commitments". Rivals.; "2010 Michigan Football Commits". Scout.; "ESPN". ESPN.; "Scout.com Team Recruiting Rankings". Scout.; "2010 Team Ranking". Rivals.com.

== College career ==
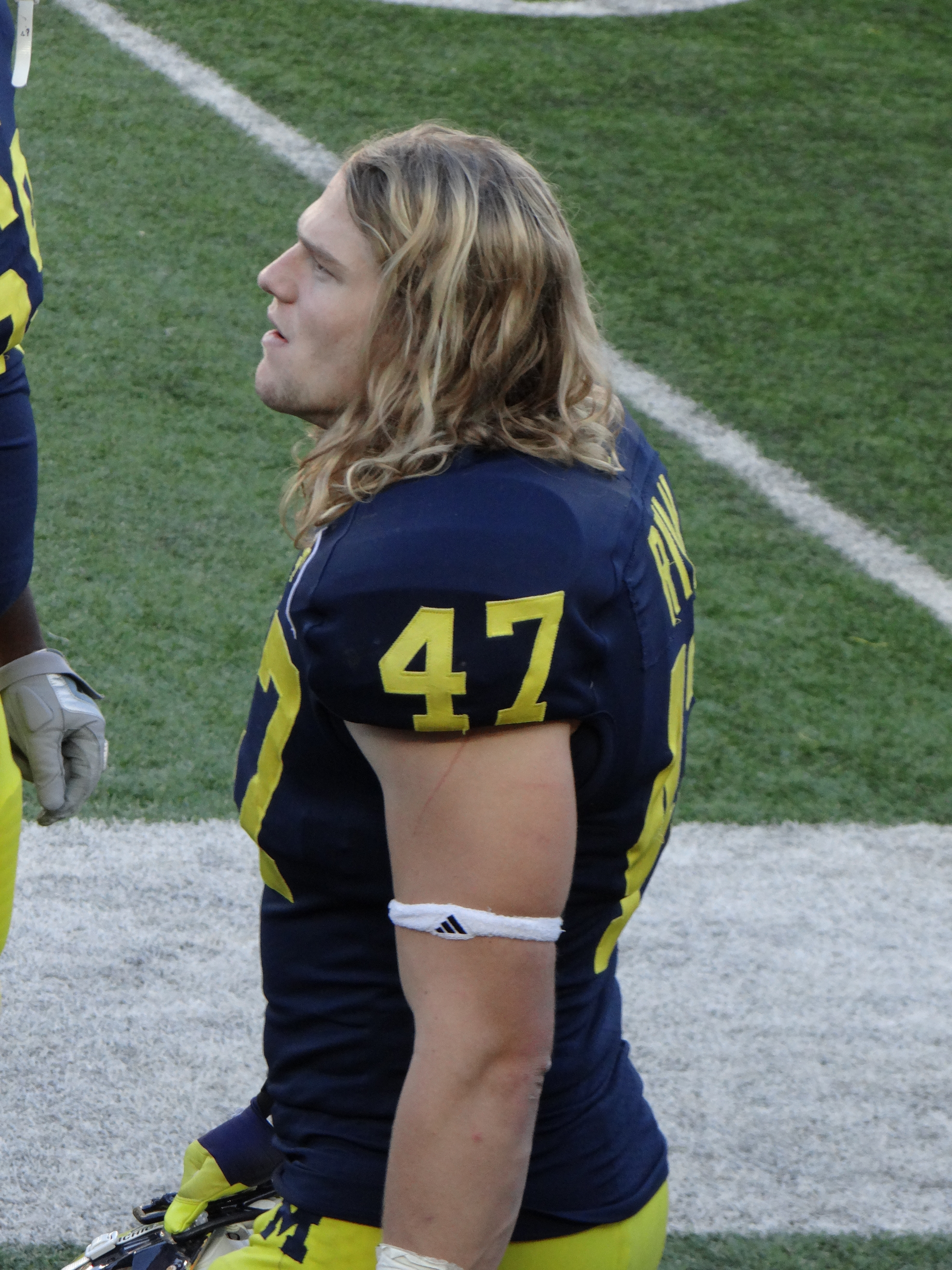
Ryan with Michigan in 2012

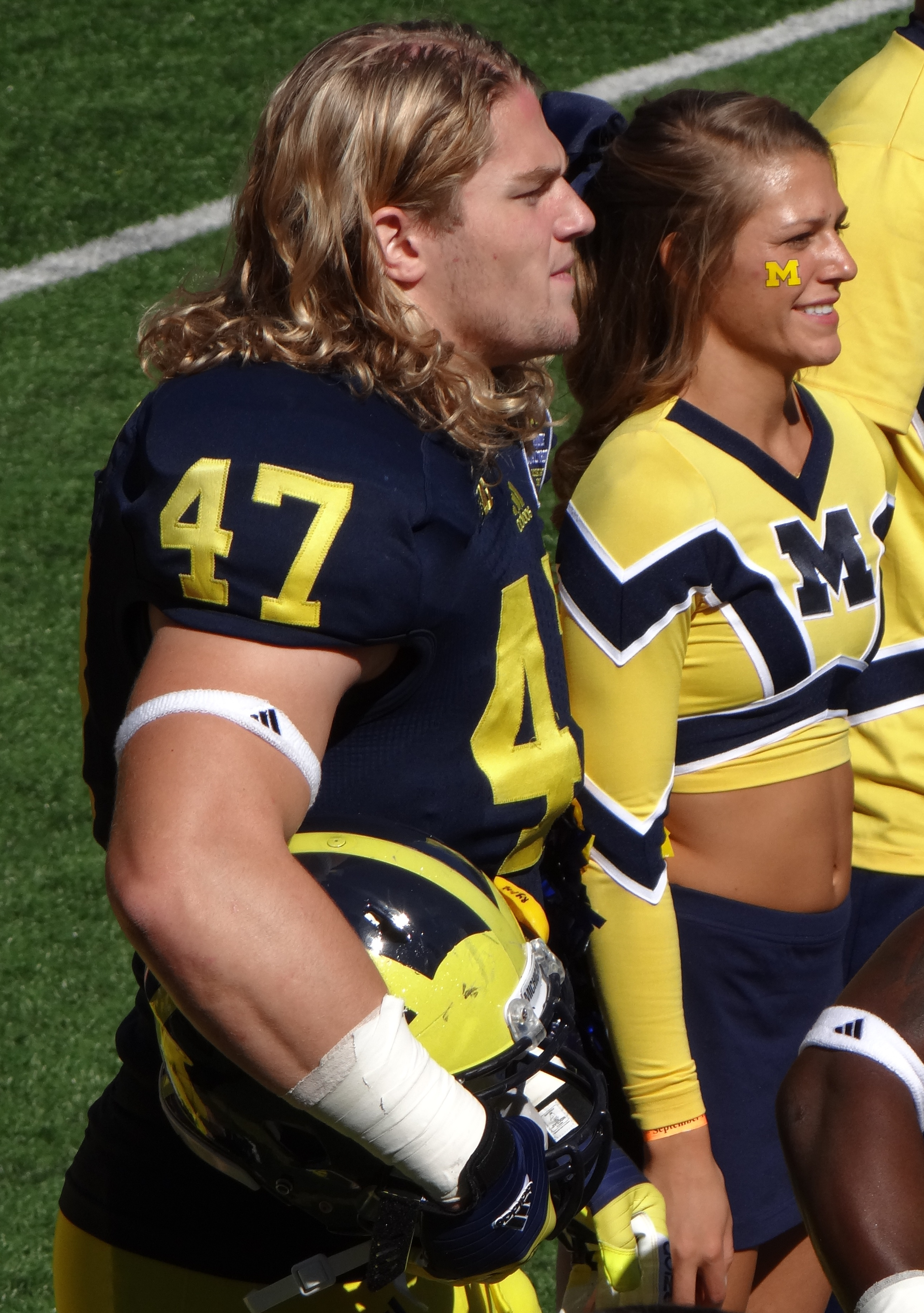
Ryan at Michigan Stadium, September 2012

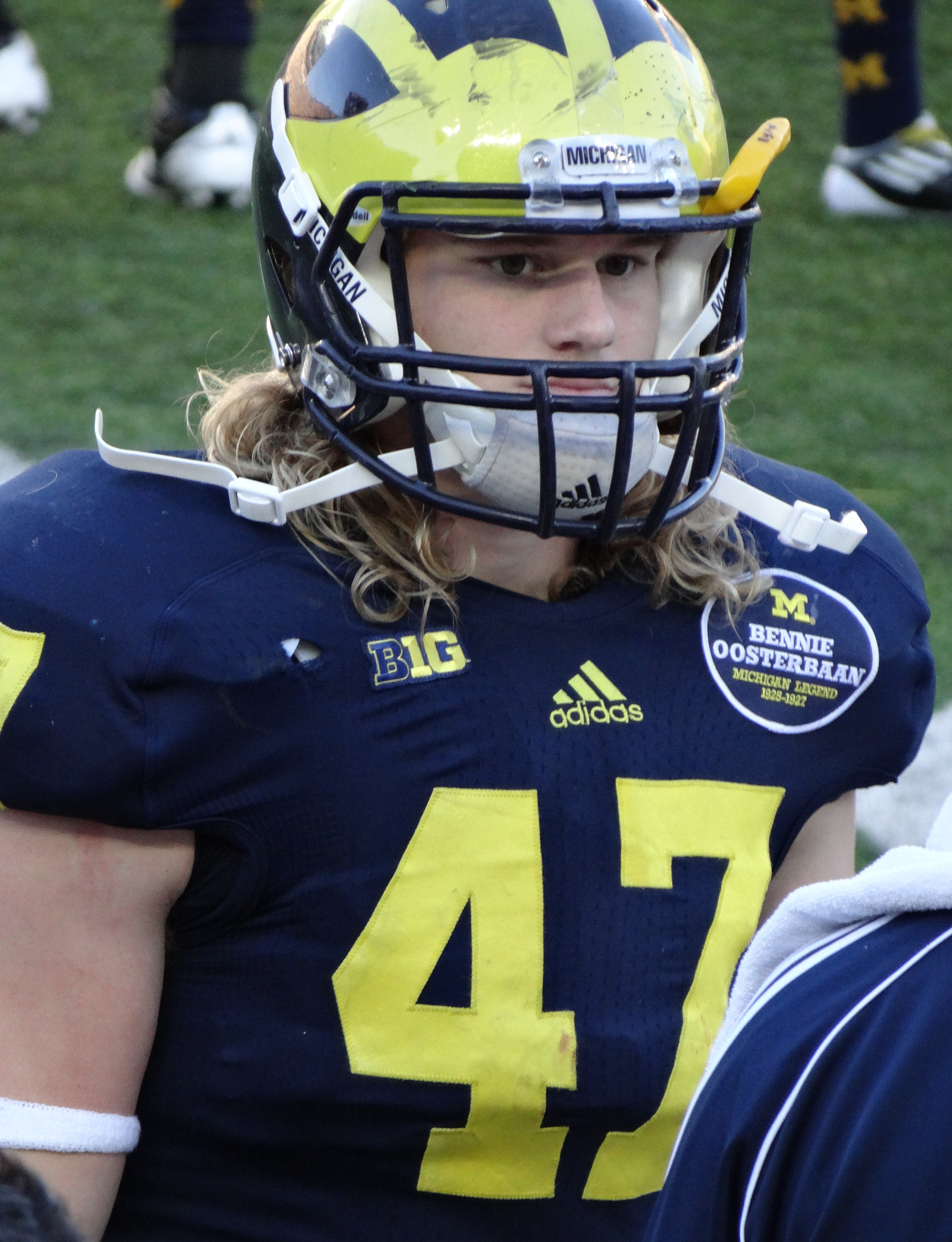
Ryan playing in 2012

Ryan redshirted his freshman year for the 2010 Michigan Wolverines football team. As a redshirt freshman, he started in the September 3 opener for the 2011 team against Western Michigan as a result of a back injury to Cam Gordon. In the game, Ryan deflected a pass that was intercepted and returned for a touchdown. He went on to start 11 games and play in all 13. On September 24, 2011, against new head coach Brady Hoke's former team, San Diego State, Ryan had two fumble recoveries. His first career quarterback sack came on October 1 in the Little Brown Jug rivalry game against Minnesota. It was his only sack that year until the final game of the season. In the January 3, 2012 Sugar Bowl 23–20 overtime victory against Virginia Tech, Ryan had 4 tackles for a loss, including one sack and one 22-yard loss by David Wilson. During the game, he had his season-high 7 tackles (6 solo). For the season, he earned 2011 Big Ten Conference All-Freshman team recognition from both ESPN.com and BTN.com as well as 2011 Rivals.com 2nd team All-Freshman and College Football News All-Freshman honorable mention honors. Ryan finished among the conference leaders in tackles for a loss/game (.85, t-15th).

Prior to the second game of the 2012 season against Air Force, Ryan's number was changed from 90 to 47 following a ceremony for Bennie Oosterbaan in which his retired number was placed back into circulation as a Michigan Football Legend jersey. On October 13, Ryan was selected as Big Ten Defensive player of the week when he posted a career-high 11 tackles (3.5 for a loss and 1.5 sacks). Ryan was named an All-Big Ten second-team selection by the media and an honorable mention selection by the coaches.

During Spring practice in 2013, Ryan tore his anterior cruciate ligament. When Ryan was initially injured in the spring, there was no official diagnosis of his expected return to football, but ACL injuries typically require a year to fully heal. By August Ryan was expected to return to the field in mid October. On August 25, 2013, he was named one of four team co-captains along with Taylor Lewan, Courtney Avery, and Cam Gordon. Ryan was cleared to play by doctors on October 7, ahead of the October 12 contest against Penn State.

Ryan entered the 2014 season on the preseason watchlists for the Bronko Nagurski Trophy, Butkus Award, Lombardi Award, and Bednarik Award. Ryan was a late addition to the Lott IMPACT Trophy watch list. In the offseason, Michigan announced that Ryan would be moving to middle linebacker. In the September 6 Michigan–Notre Dame football rivalry game, Ryan tied his career high with 11 tackles against Notre Dame. On October 13, Ryan was recognized as Big Ten co-Defensive Player of the Week (along with Damien Wilson) after recording 10 tackles (3 for a loss) against Penn State on October 11. On October 27, Ryan became one of 15 semifinalists for the Butkus Award. On November 3, Ryan was again recognized as Big Ten co-Defensive Player of the Week (along with Louis Trinca-Pasat) after recording 11 tackles (2.5 for a loss and 2 forced fumbles) against Indiana on November 1. On November 24, Ryan was named one of five finalist for the Butkus Award. Following the regular season, he was named first-team All-Big Ten by both the coaches and the media. He was an honorable mention selection to the 2014 College Football All-America Team by Sports Illustrated. He won The Roger Zatkoff Award as the team's top linebacker in 2012, 2013, and 2014.

=== College statistics ===
Season	GP	Defense				
Season	GP	Cmb	TfL	Sck	Int	FF
2011	13	37	11.0	3.0	0	1
2012	13	88	16.0	4.5	0	4
2013	8	30	4.5	0.0	0	0
2014	12	112	14.0	2.0	1	2
Totals	33	267	45.5	9.5	1	7

== Professional career ==
=== Pre-draft ===
On December 13, 2014, it was announced that Ryan had accepted his invitation to play in the 2015 East–West Shrine Game. On January 17, 2015, Ryan attended the East–West Shrine Game and recorded five combined tackles, a tackle for a loss, and one sack as part of Mike Singletary's East team that defeated the North 19–3. He was one of 34 collegiate linebackers to attend the 2015 NFL Scouting Combine in Indianapolis, Indiana. Ryan completed all of the combine drills and finished fifth among all participating linebackers in the three-cone drill, tied for sixth in the short shuttle, and finished eighth in the 40-yard dash. On March 12, 2015, Ryan attended Michigan's pro day, but opted to stand on his combine numbers and only perform positional drills for scouts and team representatives from 18 NFL teams. During the pre-draft process, Ryan attended a private visit with the Miami Dolphins. At the conclusion of the pre-draft process, Ryan was projected to be a fourth or fifth-round pick by NFL draft experts and scouts. He was ranked the 12th best outside linebacker prospect in the draft by NFLDraftScout.com and was ranked the 15th best outside linebacker by ESPN.

External videos
- Jake Ryan's NFL Combine Workout

Pre-draft measurables
Height	Weight	Arm length	Hand span	40-yard dash	10-yard split	20-yard split	20-yard shuttle	Three-cone drill	Vertical jump	Broad jump	Bench press	Wonderlic
6 ft 2 3/8 in (1.89 m)	240 lb (109 kg)	31 in (0.79 m)	9 3/8 in (0.24 m)	4.65 s	1.62 s	2.71 s	4.20 s	7.11 s	34.5 in (0.88 m)	10 ft 0 in (3.05 m)	20 reps	22
All values are from NFL Combine

=== Green Bay Packers ===
==== 2015 ====
The Green Bay Packers selected Ryan in the fourth round (129th overall) of the 2015 NFL draft. He was the 15th linebacker drafted in 2015. On May 7, 2015, the Packers signed Ryan to a four-year, $2.73 million contract that includes a signing bonus of $456,678.

External videos
- Green Bay Packers select Jake Ryan

Throughout training camp, Ryan competed for a job as a starting inside linebacker after they were left vacant after the release of A. J. Hawk and Brad Jones. He competed against Clay Matthews III, Sam Barrington, Nate Palmer, Joe Thomas, and Carl Bradford. Head coach Mike McCarthy named Ryan the fourth inside linebacker on the depth chart behind Clay Matthews, Sam Barrington, and Nate Palmer to begin the regular season.

He made his professional regular season debut in the Packers' season-opener at the Chicago Bears and recorded one solo tackle during their 31–23 victory. Ryan was promoted to the third inside linebacker after Sam Barrington suffered a season-ending foot injury during the game. In Week 3, Ryan recorded a solo tackle on special teams as the Packers defeated the Kansas City Chiefs 38–28. He left the game in the third quarter after sustaining a hamstring injury and was sidelined for the next two games (Weeks 4–5). On November 8, 2015, Ryan recorded a season-high ten combined tackles during a 37–29 loss at the Carolina Panthers. In Week 10, Ryan made his first career start after defensive coordinator Dom Capers elected to start him at inside linebacker over Nate Palmer. He recorded a season-high tying ten combined tackles in the Packers' 27–23 win at the Detroit Lions. He remained the starting inside linebacker with Clay Matthews for the last five games of the season. Ryan finished his rookie season in 2015 with 50 combined tackles (35 solo) and a fumble recovery in 14 games and five starts. Pro Football Focus gave Ryan an overall grade of 42.5 for his rookie season. His overall grade was poor due to his issues with pass coverage.

The Green Bay Packers finished second in the NFC North with a 10–6 record and received a playoff berth. On January 10, 2016, Ryan started his first career playoff games and recorded five combined tackles in a 35–18 victory at the Washington Redskins in the NFC Wildcard game. They were eliminated after being defeated 26–20 in overtime by the Arizona Cardinals in the NFC Divisional round.

==== 2016 ====
During open practices and organized team activities, Ryan and rookie Blake Martinez impressed coaches by developing a rapport and chemistry while they both received first-team at inside linebacker. They were dubbed by "Jake and Blake" by fans, a play on "Shake and Bake", a catchphrase of popularized by the film Talladega Nights: The Ballad of Ricky Bobby. Ryan was named the starting inside linebacker with Blake Martinez to start the regular season, with Clay Matthews moving back to starting outside linebacker with Nick Perry.

He started the Packers' season-opener at the Jacksonville Jaguars and made seven combined tackles and his first career pass deflection during their 27–23 victory. In Week 9, Ryan recorded a season-high 12 combined tackles and broke up a pass as the Packers lost to the Indianapolis Colts 31–26. On November 13, Ryan suffered an ankle injury during a 47–25 loss at the Tennessee Titans missed the next two games. Ryan finished the 2016 season with a career-high 82 combined tackles (57 solo) and three pass deflections in 14 games and ten starts. He received an overall grade of 76.4 from Pro Football Focus and was ranked their third most improved second year Player.

The Green Bay Packers finished atop their division with a 10–6 record and received a playoff berth. On January 8, 2017, Ryan recorded 12 combined tackles and a career-high three pass break ups in the Packers' 38–13 win against the New York Giants in the NFC Wildcard game. After defeating the Dallas Cowboys in the NFC Divisional round, the Green Bay Packers lost 44–21 at the Atlanta Falcons in the NFC Championship. In the loss to the Falcons, Ryan had four total tackles.

==== 2017 ====
Ryan and Martinez returned as the starting inside linebackers to begin the 2017 regular season. He was sidelined for a Week 3 win against the Cincinnati Bengals after sustaining a hamstring injury and concussion the previous week. December 3, 2017, Ryan recorded ten combined tackles and made his first career sack on Tampa Bay Buccaneers quarterback Jameis Winston during a 26–20 victory. In Week 16, Ryan collected a season-high 11 combined tackles in the Packers' 16–0 loss to the Minnesota Vikings. He finished the 2017 season with 81 combined tackles (52 solo) and a sack in 15 games and 12 starts. Pro Football Focus gave Ryan an overall grade of 82.1, which ranked 19th among all qualified linebackers in 2017. The Green Bay Packers did not qualify for the playoffs after they finished third in the NFC North with a 7–9 record. Offensive coordinator Edgar Bennett and defensive coordinator Dom Capers were both fired at the end of the season.

==== 2018 ====
On July 30, 2018, Ryan suffered a knee injury in training camp and was carted off the field. On August 1, an MRI revealed that he suffered a torn ACL, keeping him out the rest of the year.

=== Jacksonville Jaguars ===
On March 19, 2019, Ryan signed with the Jaguars. He was placed on the reserve/non-football injury list on August 31, to start the season. Ryan was activated on November 30. He was placed back on injured reserve on December 10.

On February 24, 2020, the Jaguars declined the option on Ryan's contract, making him a free agent.

=== Baltimore Ravens ===
Ryan signed with the Baltimore Ravens on May 4, 2020. He was released on June 11 with a non-football injury designation.

== NFL career statistics ==
=== Regular season ===
Year	Team	Games		Tackles					Interceptions						Fumbles	
Year	Team	GP	GS	Cmb	Solo	Ast	Sck	Sfty	PD	Int	Yds	Avg	Lng	TD	FF	FR
2015	GB	14	5	50	35	15	0.0	0	0	0	0	0.0	0	0	0	1
2016	GB	14	10	82	57	25	0.0	0	3	0	0	0.0	0	0	0	0
2017	GB	15	12	81	52	29	1.0	0	0	0	0	0.0	0	0	1	0
Total		43	27	213	144	69	1.0	0	3	0	0	0.0	0	0	1	1
Source: NFL.com

=== Postseason ===
Year	Team	Games		Tackles					Interceptions						Fumbles	
Year	Team	GP	GS	Cmb	Solo	Ast	Sck	Sfty	PD	Int	Yds	Avg	Lng	TD	FF	FR
2015	GB	2	2	11	7	4	0.0	0	0	0	0	0.0	0	0	0	0
2016	GB	3	3	20	15	5	0.0	0	3	0	0	0.0	0	0	0	0
Total		5	5	31	22	9	0.0	0	3	0	0	0.0	0	0	0	0
Source: pro-football-reference.com

== Personal life ==
Ryan comes from a family of football players: older brother Connor (wide receiver) and younger brother Zack (linebacker) played for Ball State; father, Tim, was a wide receiver at Wake Forest (1980–84); maternal grandfather, Francis E. Sweeney, an Ohio Supreme Court justice, played defensive tackle for Xavier as well as in the Canadian Football League. Ryan is Catholic.
