= Za'Darius Smith =

American football player (born 1992)

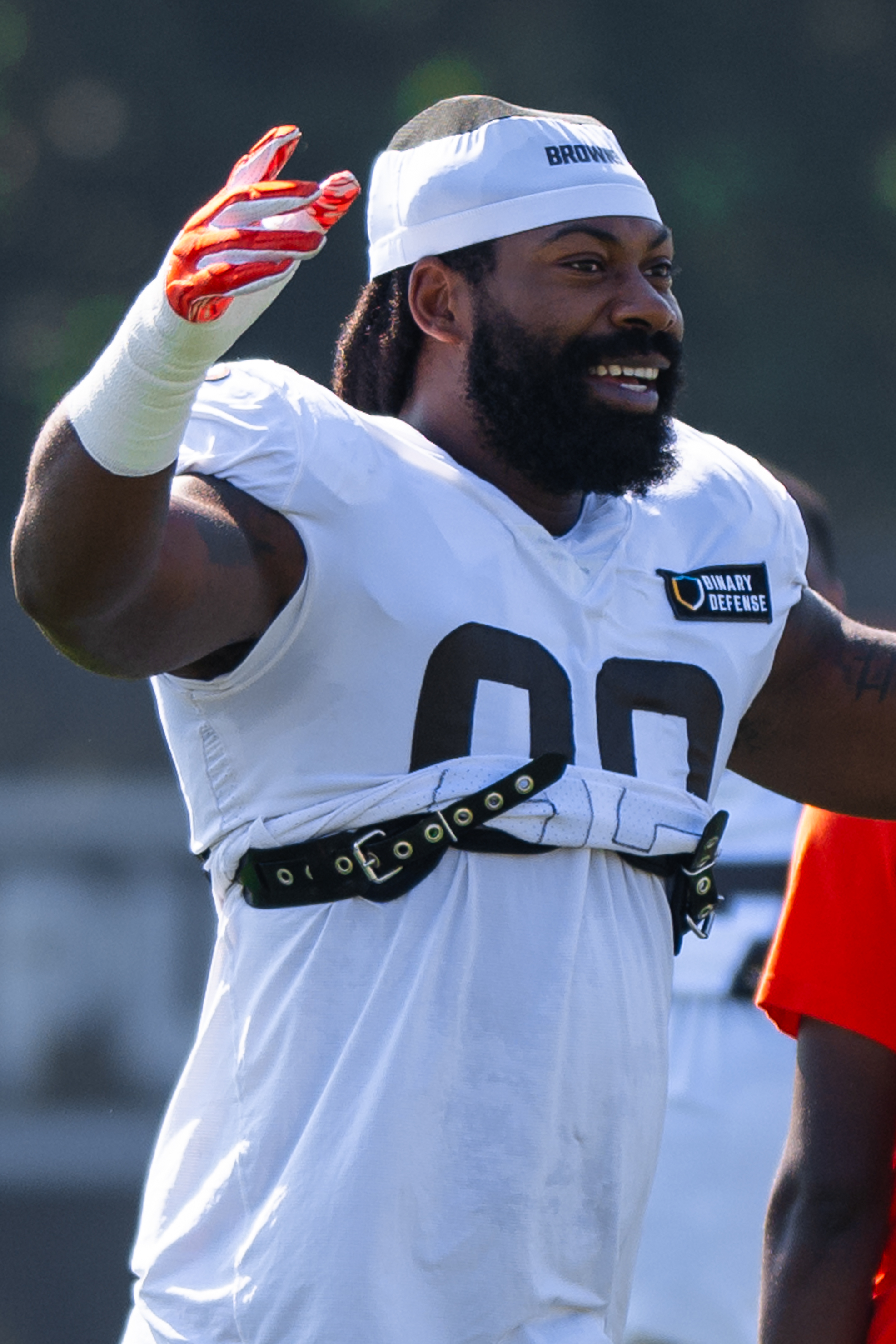
- Smith with the Cleveland Browns in 2023

No. 55 – Atlanta Falcons
- Position: Defensive end
- Roster status: Active

Personal information
- Born: September 8, 1992 (age 34); Montgomery, Alabama, U.S.
- Listed height: 6 ft 4 in (1.93 m)
- Listed weight: 270 lb (122 kg)

Career information
- High school: Greenville (Greenville, Alabama)
- College: East Mississippi CC (2011–2012); Kentucky (2013–2014)
- NFL draft: 2015: 4th round, 122nd overall pick

Career history
- Baltimore Ravens (2015–2018); Green Bay Packers (2019–2021); Minnesota Vikings (2022); Cleveland Browns (2023–2024); Detroit Lions (2024); Philadelphia Eagles (2025); Atlanta Falcons (2026–present)

Awards and highlights
- Second-team All-Pro (2020); 3× Pro Bowl (2019, 2020, 2022); Third-team All-SEC (2013)

Career NFL statistics as of Week 10, 2026
- Total tackles: 354
- Sacks: 75.0
- Pass deflections: 17
- Forced fumbles: 10
- Fumble recoveries: 2
- Stats at Pro Football Reference

Za'Darius Smith (born September 8, 1992) is an American professional football defensive end for the Atlanta Falcons of the National Football League (NFL). He played college football for the East Mississippi Lions and Kentucky Wildcats. He was selected by the Baltimore Ravens in the fourth round of the 2015 NFL draft. He also played for the Green Bay Packers, Minnesota Vikings, Cleveland Browns, Detroit Lions and Philadelphia Eagles.

== Early life ==
Smith attended Greenville High School in Greenville, Alabama. Smith played basketball in high school and did not start playing football until his senior year.

== College career ==
Smith played college football for two years at East Mississippi Community College before transferring to the University of Kentucky. In his two years at East Mississippi, he recorded 66 tackles and 11 sacks. In his first year at Kentucky, Smith started all 12 games and recorded 59 tackles and six sacks, which ranked seventh in the Southeastern Conference (SEC). As a senior in 2014, Smith had 60 tackles and 4.5 sacks.

== Professional career ==
On January 17, 2015, Smith appeared in the 2015 East–West Shrine Game and recorded two combined tackles and one sack to help the East defeat the West 19–3. Smith was recognized as the most valuable defensive player in the East-West Shrine Game. Smith subsequently received a LB invitation to the 2015 Senior Bowl. On January 24, 2015, Smith appeared in the Reese's Senior Bowl and helped the North team defeat the South 34–13. At the conclusion of the pre-draft process, Smith was projected to be a third or fourth round pick by NFL draft experts and scouts. He was ranked as the 12th best defensive end prospect by DraftScout.com.

Pre-draft measurables
| Height | Weight | Arm length | Hand span | Wingspan | 40-yard dash | 10-yard split | 20-yard split | 20-yard shuttle | Three-cone drill | Vertical jump | Broad jump | Bench press |
|---|---|---|---|---|---|---|---|---|---|---|---|---|
| 6 ft 4 1/2 in (1.94 m) | 274 lb (124 kg) | 32 5/8 in (0.83 m) | 10 in (0.25 m) | 6 ft 7 3/4 in (2.03 m) | 4.73 s | 1.70 s | 2.73 s | 4.64 s | 7.42 s | 29.0 in (0.74 m) | 9 ft 5 in (2.87 m) | 23 reps |
All values from NFL Combine/Pro Day

=== Baltimore Ravens ===
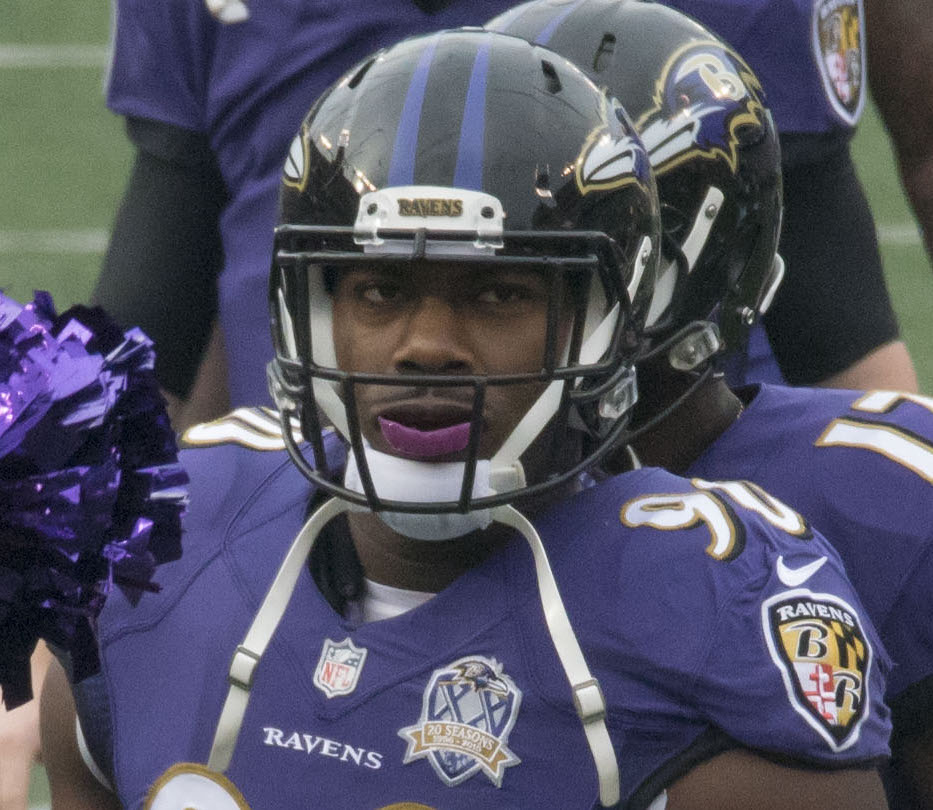
Smith with the Baltimore Ravens in 2015

==== 2015 ====
The Baltimore Ravens selected Smith in the fourth round (122nd overall) of the 2015 NFL draft. Smith was the 17th defensive end drafted in 2015. The pick used to draft him was acquired during a trade with the Detroit Lions in exchange for Haloti Ngata. On May 8, 2015, the Baltimore Ravens signed Smith to a four-year, $2.76 million contract that includes a signing bonus of $483,152.

Smith entered training camp as a backup outside linebacker. Head coach John Harbaugh named Smith the backup weakside linebacker, behind Terrell Suggs, to start the regular season.

On September 20, 2015, Smith made his professional regular season debut during a 37–33 loss at the Oakland Raiders and made one solo tackle. On October 1, 2015, Smith recorded a season-high four solo tackles and made a season-high two sacks during a 23–20 overtime win at the Pittsburgh Steelers. Smith made his first career sack on Steelers’ quarterback Michael Vick for a six-yard loss during the third quarter and would also sack him on the next play. As a rookie in 2015, Smith played 15 games with 30 tackles, 5.5 sacks, and 2 pass defended.

==== 2016–2018 ====
In the 2016 season, he played in 13 games and started four. He recorded one pass defended, one forced fumble, one sack, 20 tackles, and four quarterback hits.

In the 2017 season, he appeared in 14 games and started four. He recorded one pass defensed, one forced fumble, 3.5 sacks, 24 tackles, and 16 quarterback hits.

In the 2018 season, he appeared in 16 games and started eight. In Week 6 of the 2018 season, Smith recorded three sacks, which was part of the new team record 11 sacks, in a 21–0 win over the Tennessee Titans, earning him AFC Defensive Player of the Week. He finished the season with career-highs with 45 combined tackles, 8.5 sacks, two passes defensed and a forced fumble. He led the Ravens in sacks and finished sixth on the team in tackles.

=== Green Bay Packers ===
==== 2019 ====
On March 14, 2019, Smith signed a four-year, $66 million contract with the Green Bay Packers. In Smith's debut as a Packer in week 1, he made 3 tackles and sacked Mitchell Trubisky once in the 10–3 win over the Chicago Bears. In week 6 against the Detroit Lions, Smith recorded a sack on Matthew Stafford in the 23–22 win. In week 8 against the Kansas City Chiefs, Smith sacked Matt Moore twice in the 31–24 win. In week 12 against the San Francisco 49ers, Smith recorded a team high 6 tackles and sacked Jimmy Garoppolo once in the 37–8 loss. In week 16 against the Minnesota Vikings, Smith sacked Kirk Cousins 3.5 times during the 23–10 win. Smith finished the regular season with a career high 13.5 sacks.

In the Divisional Round of the playoffs against the Seattle Seahawks, Smith recorded 2 sacks on Russell Wilson during the 28–23 win.

==== 2020 ====
In Week 3 of the 2020 season against the New Orleans Saints, Smith forced a fumble on Taysom Hill that was recovered by the Packers during the 37–30 win. In Week 4 against the Atlanta Falcons, Smith sacked Matt Ryan three times during the 30–16 win. Smith was named the NFC Defensive Player of the Week for his performance in Week 4. In Week 12 against the Chicago Bears, Smith recorded a strip sack on Mitchell Trubisky that was recovered and returned for a touchdown by teammate Preston Smith during the 41–25 win. On December 21, 2020, he was selected for the 2021 Pro Bowl. On January 8, 2021, he made the 2020 All-Pro Team second team.

==== 2021 ====
On July 28, 2021, Smith reported to Packers' training camp with a back injury, and the team placed him on the Non-Football Injury list (NFI). He practiced sparingly during camp, but assured fans that he would be ready for the Packers' Week 1 game with the Saints. Smith played just 18 snaps during the 3–38 loss, behind second-year teammate Jonathan Garvin, and was called for a roughing the passer penalty that negated a Darnell Savage interception. On September 17, Smith was placed on injured reserve with the same back injury that nagged him throughout training camp. During the week of September 27, Smith underwent back surgery and was ruled out indefinitely. The Packers expressed hope he would be back at some point during the season. On October 29, Smith posted on Twitter that he was back in Green Bay and "can't wait to get back on the field!" Despite that, head coach Matt LaFleur cautioned that their staff were hopeful but would have to "get him back in the building and see where he's at." On January 12, 2022, the Packers opened the practice window for Smith. On January 22, Smith, along with fellow linebacker Whitney Mercilus, were officially activated off injured reserve ahead of the Packers' first playoff game in the Divisional Round against the San Francisco 49ers. In his first snap since Week 1, rushing on the interior on a 3rd and 14, Smith beat left guard Laken Tomlinson to sack quarterback Jimmy Garoppolo. He finished the game with 1 sack and 1 solo tackle, which was for a loss.

On March 14, 2022, Smith, who would have been responsible for a $27.7 million cap hit in 2023, was released by the Packers to save $15.3 million in salary cap space.

=== Minnesota Vikings ===
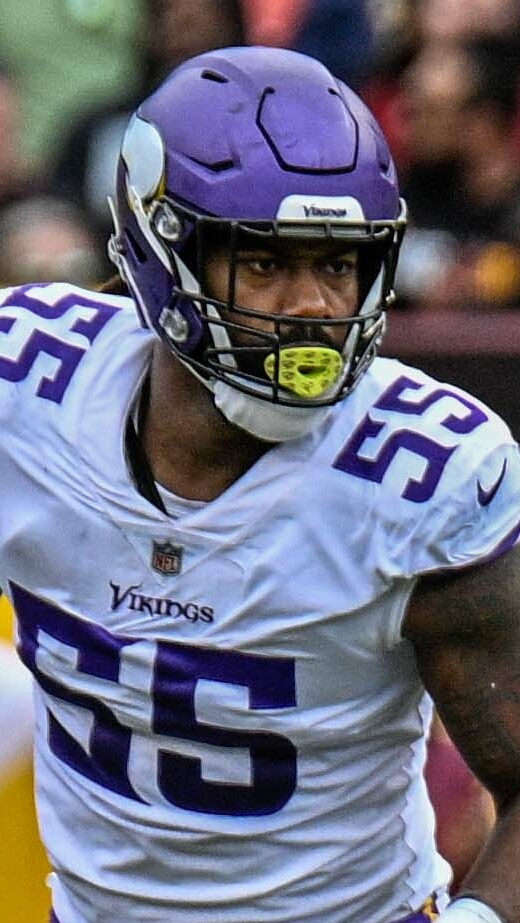
Smith with the Minnesota Vikings in 2022

On March 22, 2022, Smith signed a three-year, $42 million contract with the Vikings, reuniting him with Mike Pettine and Mike Smith.

For the month of October, Smith was named the NFC Defensive Player of the Month with 14 tackles, 6.5 sacks, eight tackles for loss, and a pass breakup. In Week 8, Smith had seven tackles, three sacks, four tackles for loss, and a pass breakup in a 34–26 win over the Arizona Cardinals, earning NFC Defensive Player of the Week.

=== Cleveland Browns ===
On May 16, 2023, the Cleveland Browns traded two fifth round picks in exchange for Smith, a 2025 sixth-round pick and a 2025 seventh-round pick. He started 16 games and finished second on the team with 5.5 sacks.

On March 13, 2024, Smith signed a two-year contract extension with the Browns.

=== Detroit Lions ===
On November 5, 2024, Smith and a 2026 seventh round draft pick were traded to the Detroit Lions in exchange for a 2025 fifth round and a 2026 sixth round draft picks. Smith made his Lions debut on November 17, against the Jacksonville Jaguars, where he recorded half of a sack on quarterback Mac Jones in a 52–6 win.

On March 9, 2025, Smith was released by the Lions.

=== Philadelphia Eagles ===
On September 5, 2025, Smith signed a one-year, $9 million contract with the Philadelphia Eagles. He played in five games for Philadelphia, including two starts, and recorded 1.5 sacks and 10 combined tackles.

On October 13, Smith announced that he would be retiring from football. He revealed in 2026 that he "was in a dark place" after being told by his mother's doctor that she did not have long to live; his mother died that month and his grandmother and father also died afterward.

=== Atlanta Falcons ===
In August 2026, Smith tried out for the Cleveland Browns. Both sides appeared to have reached a deal, but then Smith decided to explore other options. On August 18, 2026, Smith and the Atlanta Falcons agreed to a one-year, $6 million contract, officially ending his retirement. The signing reunited him with Kevin Stefanski, who was his head coach when Smith played for the Browns in 2023 and 2024.

== Career statistics ==
Legend
| **Bold** | Career high |

=== NFL ===
==== Regular season ====
| Year | Team | Games | | Tackles | | | | Interceptions | | | | | | Fumbles | |
| Year | Team | GP | GS | Cmb | Solo | Ast | Sck | Int | Yds | Avg | Lng | TD | PD | FF | FR |
|---|---|---|---|---|---|---|---|---|---|---|---|---|---|---|---|
| 2015 | BAL | 15 | 0 | 30 | 20 | 10 | 5.5 | 0 | 0 | 0.0 | 0 | 0 | 1 | 0 | 0 |
| 2016 | BAL | 13 | 4 | 20 | 10 | 10 | 1.0 | 0 | 0 | 0.0 | 0 | 0 | 1 | 1 | 0 |
| 2017 | BAL | 14 | 4 | 24 | 15 | 9 | 3.5 | 0 | 0 | 0.0 | 0 | 0 | 1 | 1 | 0 |
| 2018 | BAL | 16 | 8 | 45 | 26 | **19** | 8.5 | 0 | 0 | 0.0 | 0 | 0 | 2 | 1 | 0 |
| 2019 | GB | 16 | 16 | **55** | **41** | 14 | **13.5** | 0 | 0 | 0.0 | 0 | 0 | 0 | 1 | 0 |
| 2020 | GB | 16 | 16 | 52 | 35 | 17 | 12.5 | 0 | 0 | 0.0 | 0 | 0 | 2 | **4** | **2** |
| 2021 | GB | 1 | 0 | 1 | 1 | 0 | 0.0 | 0 | 0 | 0.0 | 0 | 0 | 0 | 0 | 0 |
| 2022 | MIN | 16 | 16 | 44 | 32 | 12 | 10.0 | 0 | 0 | 0.0 | 0 | 0 | **5** | 1 | 0 |
| 2023 | CLE | 16 | 16 | 27 | 18 | 9 | 5.5 | 0 | 0 | 0.0 | 0 | 0 | 3 | 1 | 0 |
| 2024 | CLE | 9 | 9 | 23 | 15 | 8 | 5.0 | 0 | 0 | 0.0 | 0 | 0 | 0 | 0 | 0 |
| 2024 | DET | 8 | 7 | 12 | 7 | 5 | 4.0 | 0 | 0 | 0.0 | 0 | 0 | 1 | 0 | 0 |
| 2025 | PHI | 5 | 2 | 10 | 3 | 7 | 1.5 | 0 | 0 | 0.0 | 0 | 0 | 0 | 0 | 0 |
| 2026 | ATL | 9 | 0 | 11 | 7 | 4 | 4.5 | 0 | 0 | 0.0 | 0 | 0 | 1 | 0 | 0 |
| Career | | 154 | 98 | 354 | 230 | 124 | 75.0 | 0 | 0 | 0.0 | 0 | 0 | 17 | 10 | 2 |

==== Postseason ====
| Year | Team | Games | | Tackles | | | | Interceptions | | | | | | Fumbles | |
| Year | Team | GP | GS | Cmb | Solo | Ast | Sck | Int | Yds | Avg | Lng | TD | PD | FF | FR |
|---|---|---|---|---|---|---|---|---|---|---|---|---|---|---|---|
| 2018 | BAL | 1 | 1 | 1 | 1 | 0 | 0.0 | 0 | 0 | 0.0 | 0 | 0 | 0 | 0 | 0 |
| 2019 | GB | 2 | 2 | **7** | **5** | **2** | **2.0** | 0 | 0 | 0.0 | 0 | 0 | 0 | 0 | 0 |
| 2020 | GB | 2 | 2 | 5 | 3 | **2** | 1.0 | 0 | 0 | 0.0 | 0 | 0 | 0 | 0 | 0 |
| 2021 | GB | 1 | 0 | 1 | 1 | 0 | 1.0 | 0 | 0 | 0.0 | 0 | 0 | 0 | 0 | 0 |
| 2022 | MIN | 1 | 1 | 3 | 2 | 1 | 0.0 | 0 | 0 | 0.0 | 0 | 0 | 0 | 0 | 0 |
| 2023 | CLE | 1 | 1 | 1 | 0 | 1 | 0.0 | 0 | 0 | 0.0 | 0 | 0 | 0 | 0 | 0 |
| 2024 | DET | 1 | 1 | 0 | 0 | 0 | 0.0 | 0 | 0 | 0.0 | 0 | 0 | **1** | 0 | 0 |
| Total | | 9 | 8 | 18 | 12 | 6 | 4.0 | 0 | 0 | 0.0 | 0 | 0 | 1 | 0 | 0 |

=== College ===
| Season | Team | Conf | Class | Pos | GP | Tackles | | | | | Int & Fum | | |
| Season | Team | Conf | Class | Pos | GP | Solo | Ast | Cmb | TfL | Sck | PD | FR | FF |
|---|---|---|---|---|---|---|---|---|---|---|---|---|---|
| 2013 | Kentucky | SEC | JR | DE | 12 | 24 | **35** | 59 | **7** | **6.5** | 1 | **1** | 0 |
| 2014 | Kentucky | SEC | SR | DE | 12 | **26** | 34 | **60** | **7** | 4.5 | **2** | **1** | 0 |
| Career | | | | | 24 | 50 | 69 | 119 | 14 | 11.0 | 3 | 2 | 0 |

== Personal life ==
Smith is the uncle of Detroit Lions tight end Jackson Meeks.

== Legal troubles ==
On September 29, 2019, Smith was cited by the Racine County Sheriff's Office for possession of marijuana and speeding in a construction zone. Smith and teammates Rashan Gary and Kingsley Keke were returning to Green Bay from Chicago when a deputy stopped them for driving 81 mph in a 60-mph construction zone near the intersection of Interstate 94 and Highway 20 in the town of Mount Pleasant. The deputy smelled the odor of marijuana in the vehicle and searched it, discovering three blunts and a THC vaping cartridge in a duffel bag in the rear of the vehicle. None of the men appeared to be high or had any drugs or paraphernalia on their persons when searched, but all three were briefly placed in handcuffs, questioned separately, and then released after Smith admitted to ownership of the paraphernalia, as well as to smoking marijuana before leaving Chicago. Smith cooperated with the officer throughout the incident, and hired a lawyer who entered a plea of not guilty on both charges. On July 30, 2020, the Racine County prosecutor dismissed the charges.
