= Richard Perry (disambiguation) =

Richard Perry (1942–2024) was an American music producer.

Richard Perry may also refer to:

- Richard C. Perry (born 1955), American hedge fund manager
- Rich Perry (born 1949), American jazz musician and saxophonist
- Rick Perry (born 1950), Governor of Texas (2000–2015) and United States Secretary of Energy (2017–2019)
- Dick Perry (1929–2014), American college basketball coach and athletic director

== See also ==
- Richard Parry (disambiguation)
- Richard Perre, Member of Parliament (MP) for Wycombe
