= Steve Perry (disambiguation) =

Steve Perry (born 1949) is a recording artist and the former lead singer of the band Journey.

Steve or Stephen Perry may also refer to:

- Steve Perry (author) (born 1947), science fiction author
- Stephen R. Perry (born c. 1950), legal scholar and professor of law and philosophy at the University of Pennsylvania
- Steve Perry (Oregon musician) (born 1963), lead singer of the Cherry Poppin' Daddies
- Stephen Perry (inventor) (19th century), British inventor and businessman
- Stephen Perry (writer) (1954–2010), American writer for the Thundercats cartoon and comic book
- Steve Perry, pseudonym of pornographic actor Ben Dover
- Steven Perry (born 1988), American soccer player
- Steve Perry (baseball), first-round pick of the L.A. Dodgers in 1979
- Steve Perry, multiple medalist at the World Quizzing Championships
- Stephen Joseph Perry (1833–1889), English Jesuit and astronomer
- Stephen Samuel Perry (1825–1874), collected historical manuscripts related to Texas history

== See also ==
- Stephen Parry (disambiguation)
