= B. J. Dubose =

American football player (born 1992)

B.J. Dubose
No. 90
- Position: Defensive end

Personal information
- Born: January 19, 1992 (age 34); Oakland Park, Florida, U.S.
- Listed height: 6 ft 4 in (1.93 m)
- Listed weight: 284 lb (129 kg)

Career information
- High school: Northeast (Oakland Park)
- College: Louisville
- NFL draft: 2015: 6th round, 193rd overall pick

Career history
- Minnesota Vikings (2015–2016)
- Stats at Pro Football Reference

B. J. Dubose (born January 19, 1992) is an American former professional football defensive end. He played college football at University of Louisville. He was selected by the Minnesota Vikings in the sixth round of the 2015 NFL draft.

== Early life ==
Born in Oakland Park, Florida, Dubose attended Northeast High School in his hometown. He notched 55 tackles, 11 sacks and three forced fumbles as a junior en route to third-team All-State accolades. As a senior, he recorded 60 tacklesto go along with 11 sacks. Dubose also participated in track & field at Northeast, competing in the throwing events and posting top-throws of 11.85 meters (38 feet, 9 inches) in the shot put and 32.12 meters (105 feet, 4 inches) in the discus at the 2011 BCAA North Central Qualifier.

Regarded as a three-star prospect by Rivals.com, Dubose was ranked as the No. 24 defensive end in the Rivals poll of best and was 64th in the Florida postseason top 100.

== College career ==
Dubose narrowed his college choice to Louisville, Michigan and Miami, choosing the Cardinals and redshirting in 2010. He saw three starts in 2011 as a redshirt freshman, recording 22 tackles, 3.5 tackles for loss and 2.0 sacks. Dubose started four games in 2012 as a sophomore and finished with 15 tackles and 0.5 tackle for loss. He didn't start a game as a junior, but played in 11 contests and recorded 16 tackles, 4.0 tackles for loss and 1.5 sacks. Dubose returned to the starting line-up as a senior in 2014, finishing with 41 tackles, 7.5 tackles for loss, and 4.0 sacks. He earned an invitation to the 2015 East-West Shrine Game.

== Professional career ==
Pre-draft measurables
Height	Weight	40-yard dash	10-yard split	20-yard split	Bench press
6 ft 4 in (1.93 m)	284 lb (129 kg)	5.06 s	1.77 s	2.93 s	26 reps
All values from NFL Combine

Dubose was selected by the Minnesota Vikings in the sixth round, 193rd overall, in the 2015 NFL draft. He signed a four-year, $2,399,860 contract with the Vikings, including a $119,860 signing bonus, $119,860 guaranteed, and an average annual salary of $599,965. On January 6, 2016, Dubose was promoted to the active roster. Dubose suffered a torn ACL during the Vikings organized team activities in 2016 and missed the entire 2016 season.

On May 16, 2017, Dubose was released by the Vikings.
