= James Vaughters =

American gridiron football player (born 1993)

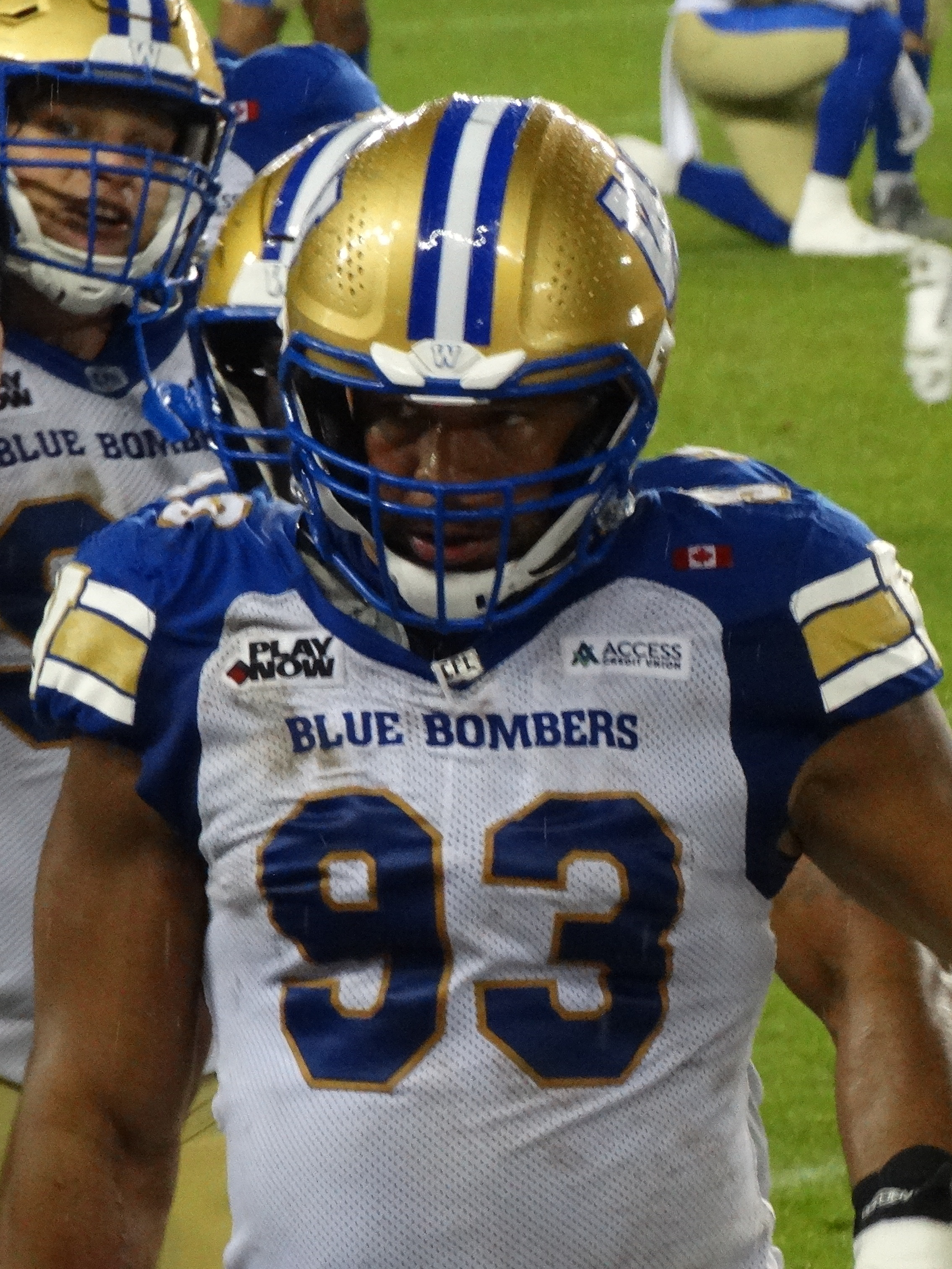
- Vaughters with the Winnipeg Blue Bombers in 2025

Saskatchewan Roughriders
- Position: Defensive lineman
- Roster status: Active
- CFL status: American

Personal information
- Born: June 27, 1993 (age 33); Chicago, Illinois, U.S.
- Listed height: 6 ft 2 in (1.88 m)
- Listed weight: 259 lb (117 kg)

Career information
- High school: Tucker (GA)
- College: Stanford
- NFL draft: 2015: undrafted

Career history
- Green Bay Packers (2015)*; New England Patriots (2015)*; Calgary Stampeders (2016)*; San Diego Chargers (2016)*; Calgary Stampeders (2017–2018); Chicago Bears (2019–2021); Atlanta Falcons (2021); Pittsburgh Steelers (2022)*; Calgary Stampeders (2023–2024); Winnipeg Blue Bombers (2025); Saskatchewan Roughriders (2026–present)
- * Offseason or practice squad member only

Awards and highlights
- Grey Cup champion (2018)

Career NFL statistics
- Total tackles: 33
- Sacks: 2.5
- Forced fumbles: 1
- Stats at Pro Football Reference

Career CFL statistics as of 2025
- Games played: 74
- Total tackles: 141
- Sacks: 27
- Forced fumbles: 3
- Stats at CFL.ca

James Alan Vaughters (born June 27, 1993) is an American professional football defensive lineman for the Saskatchewan Roughriders of the Canadian Football League (CFL). He played college football at Stanford. Vaughters was signed by the Green Bay Packers as an undrafted free agent in 2015. He has also been a member of the New England Patriots, San Diego Chargers, Chicago Bears, Atlanta Falcons, Pittsburgh Steelers, Calgary Stampeders, and Winnipeg Blue Bombers.

== Early life ==
Vaughters was born to Jonathan and Vanessa Vaughters in Chicago, Illinois. He is the third of four children: Jahnisa Tate, Jonathan Vaughters, and younger sister Ryan Vaughters. After moving to Ohio in 1996, James and family moved to Stone Mountain, Georgia where he lived the rest of his childhood from 1999 to 2011.

At Tucker High School in Tucker, Georgia, Vaughters accumulated accolades as a student, as a community mentor, and as an athlete. He graduated in the top 10% of his class with a 4.0 grade point average, including a curriculum consisting of several Advanced Placement classes. He helped Tucker to their first State Championship and two semi-final appearances. He was a top-recruited linebacker according to all the national recruiting platforms including ESPN, Scout, Rivals, MaxPreps, and PrepStar. As a senior, Vaughters had 95 tackles, 18 tackles for loss, four interceptions (one for touchdown), four sacks, and one fumble recovery (for a touchdown). He earned honors as an Under Armour All-American, 2010 Georgia Class 4A Defensive Player of the Year, DeKalb County All-Class Defensive Player of the Year, two-time Georgia Merit Scholar, two-time President's Education Award recipient, National Beta Club, National Honors Society, and a Franklin D. Watkins Award finalist for the nation’s top African-American scholar-athlete. He also appeared in several national publications including The Wall Street Journal.

== College career ==
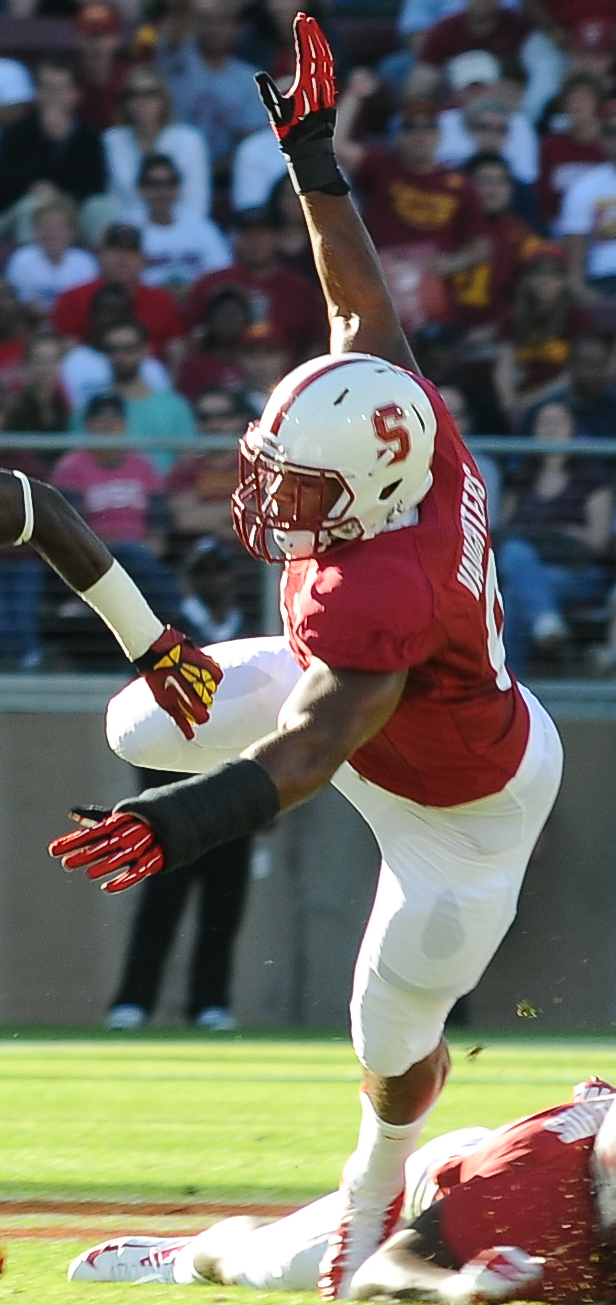
Vaughters with Stanford in 2012

At Stanford University, Vaughters earned a degree in political science and played football. He started at outside linebacker for his junior and senior seasons, after contributing as both an inside and outside linebacker for his freshman and sophomore seasons. As a senior, Vaughters had 51 tackles, 11.0 tackles for loss, and 6.5 sacks in 13 games. He was the Defensive MVP of his final college football game in the 2014 Foster Farms Bowl. He played in the 2015 East-West Shrine Game, an annual college football all-star game held by Shriner's Hospital for Children. Vaughters is also a member of Omega Psi Phi and was involved in other student organizations including Men Against Abuse Now (MAAN) and the Stanford PACS (Philanthropy and Civil Society) Community Grants Program.

== Professional career ==
Pre-draft measurables
Height	Weight	Arm length	Hand span	Wingspan	40-yard dash	10-yard split	20-yard split	20-yard shuttle	Three-cone drill	Vertical jump	Broad jump	Bench press
6 ft 1 7/8 in (1.88 m)	248 lb (112 kg)	32 1/8 in (0.82 m)	9 1/4 in (0.23 m)	6 ft 6 1/4 in (1.99 m)	4.87 s	1.66 s	2.84 s	4.47 s	7.09 s	32.5 in (0.83 m)	9 ft 4 in (2.84 m)	35 reps
All values are from Pro Day

=== Green Bay Packers ===
After going undrafted in the 2015 NFL draft, Vaughters signed with the Green Bay Packers on May 8, 2015. On September 5, 2015, he was released by the Packers during final team cuts. Vaughters was signed to the Packers' practice squad two days later. The team placed him on the practice squad injured list after suffering a torn left distal bicep tendon on September 30, 2015. He was released by the Packers with an injury settlement on October 3, 2015.

=== New England Patriots ===
On January 21, 2016, Vaughters signed a future contract with the New England Patriots. He was released by the Patriots on May 2, 2016.

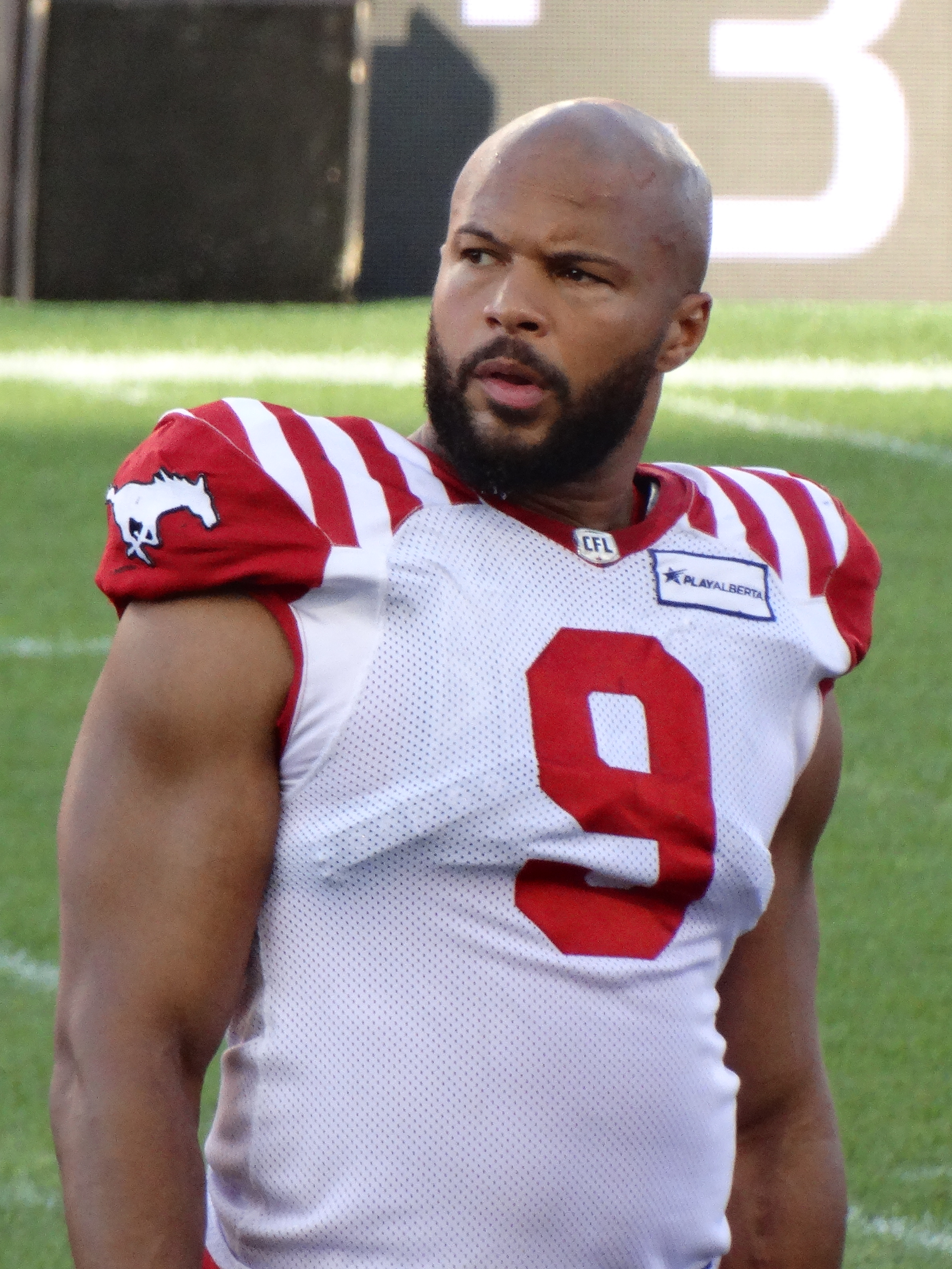
Vaughters with the Calgary Stampeders in 2024

=== Calgary Stampeders (first stint) ===
Vaughters was signed to the practice roster of the Calgary Stampeders of the Canadian Football League on July 25, 2016.

=== San Diego Chargers ===
On August 15, 2016, Vaughters was signed by the San Diego Chargers. He was released by the Chargers during final team cuts on September 3, 2016.

=== Calgary Stampeders (second stint) ===
Vaughters returned to the Stampeders for the next two seasons where he played in 33 games, recording 50 defensive tackles, 11 quarterback sacks, and eight special teams tackles. He won a Grey Cup in his second year as a member of the team.

=== Chicago Bears ===
On January 8, 2019, Vaughters signed a reserve/future contract with the Chicago Bears. On August 31, 2019, Vaughters was cut and signed to the practice squad the next day. He was released on September 12, but returned to the practice squad on October 29. He was promoted to the active roster on November 2, and made his NFL debut in that weekend's game against the Philadelphia Eagles. He mostly played on special teams, appearing on nine plays there and four on defense. He was released the next Monday and re-signed to the practice squad. He was promoted back to the active roster on November 9, but waived two days later and re-signed back to the practice squad. He returned to the 53-man roster on November 16 after Trey Burton was placed on injured reserve. He was waived again on November 19 and re-signed to the practice squad. On December 30, 2019, Vaughters was signed to a reserve/future contract. In Week 5 of the 2020 season against the Tampa Bay Buccaneers on Thursday Night Football, Vaughters recorded his first career sack on Tom Brady during the 20–19 win. He signed a contract extension with the team on March 3, 2021. On August 31, 2021 Vaughters was released by the Bears.

=== Atlanta Falcons ===
On September 3, 2021, Vaughters was signed to the Atlanta Falcons practice squad. On September 11, 2021, Vaughters was elevated to the active roster prior to the Falcons’ first game of the 2021 season versus the Philadelphia Eagles. He was signed to the active roster on November 2, 2021. On May 2, 2022, he was released by the Falcons.

=== Pittsburgh Steelers ===
On August 15, 2022, Vaughters signed with the Pittsburgh Steelers. He was waived on August 30.

=== Calgary Stampeders (third stint) ===
On January 25, 2023, Vaughters signed with the Stampeders, with whom he had been a member two previous occasions. However, he played in just six regular season games in 2023 where he recorded 15 defensive tackles, five sacks, and two forced fumbles. In 2024, he played in all 18 games where he had 32 defensive tackles, five sacks, and two forced fumbles. He was released in the following off-season on January 27, 2025.

=== Winnipeg Blue Bombers ===
On January 31, 2025, it was announced that Vaughters had signed with the Winnipeg Blue Bombers. The Blue Bombers had a record of 10-8 in 2025, with Vaughters as the teams sack leader with 6 sacks. He became a free agent upon the expiry of his contract on February 10, 2026.

=== Saskatchewan Roughriders ===
On February 10, 2026, it was announced that Vaughters had signed with the Saskatchewan Roughriders.
