= James Stewart Perry =

American sculptor

Jim Perry is an American sculptor. He received a BA in sculpture from Bard College. He began his sculpture career in the early 1970s in New York City where he exhibited extensively and, in 1975, was included in the Whitney Biennial.

== Career ==
He has had solo and two-person exhibits at:

Gremillion & Company Fine Art, Houston, Texas (2011, 2013, 2017)
J. Cacciola Gallery, Bernardsville, New Jersey (2017)
The Center for Contemporary Art, Bedminster, New Jersey (2016)
The Arts Council of Princeton, Princeton, New Jersey (2014)
Morpeth Contemporary, Hopewell, New Jersey (2010)

He has also been included in numerous juried and invitational exhibitions including those at the Annmarie Sculpture Garden and Art Center, Dowell, Maryland

Ellarslie City Museum in Trenton, New Jersey
Philips Mill Gallery in New Hope, Pennsylvania
Noyes Museum of Art in Oceanville, New Jersey
Morris Museum in Morristown, New Jersey
Dalet Gallery and the LG Tripp Gallery, both in Philadelphia.

He is represented by Gremillion & Company Fine Art in Houston, Westbrook Modern in Carmel-by-the-Sea, California, Susan Calloway Fine Arts in Washington DC and J.Cacciola Gallery W in Bernardsville, New Jersey.

== History ==
Perry was born on November 20, 1947, in New York City. His parents were Robert Perry, a professor of religion at New York University, and his mother, Mary Stewart Perry, a professional cartoonist and sister of the actor James Stewart. He was raised in Manhattan until his family moved to Erwinna, a small town in Bucks County, Pennsylvania, when he was three. He graduated from Bard College, where he received his BA in sculpture in 1971.
