= Edward Parry =

Edward Parry may refer to:

- Edward Parry (archbishop of the West Indies) (1861–1943), bishop of Guyana
- Edward Parry (bishop of Killaloe) (c. 1599–1650), bishop of Killaloe
- Edward Parry (bishop of Dover) (1830–1890), bishop of Dover
- Edward Parry (Roman Catholic priest) (1862–1922), Roman Catholic prelate, apostolic prefect of Zambesi (1920–1922)
- Edward Parry (Royal Navy officer) (1893–1972), Royal Navy admiral
- Edward Abbott Parry (1863–1943), English judge and dramatist
- Edward Parry (Methodist preacher) (1723–1786), preacher, hymn writer and poet in North Wales
- Edward Hagarty Parry (1855–1931), Canadian-born English international footballer
- Sir Edward Parry (1790–1855), English rear-admiral and Arctic explorer
- Ted Parry (fl. 1892–1925), Welsh footballer
