= Stephen Parry =

Stephen Parry may refer to:

- Stephen Parry (Australian politician) (born 1960), Australian politician from the Liberal Party
- Stephen Parry (cricketer) (born 1986), English cricketer
- Stephen Parry (swimmer) (born 1977), British middle-distance swimmer
- Stephen Parry (Welsh MP) (c. 1675–1724), Welsh politician
- Steve Parry (musician) (born 1958), founder of the band Hwyl Nofio
- Steve Parry (rugby league) (born 1988), rugby league footballer for Wales, and South Wales Scorpions

== See also ==
- Steve Perry (disambiguation)
