= Dominique Brown =

American football player (born 1991)

Profile
- Positions: Running back, quarterback

Personal information
- Born: December 27, 1991 (age 34); Cincinnati, Ohio, U.S.
- Listed height: 6 ft 2 in (1.88 m)
- Listed weight: 241 lb (109 kg)

Career information
- High school: Winton Woods (Forest Park, Ohio)
- College: Louisville
- NFL draft: 2015: undrafted

Career history
- Tampa Bay Buccaneers (2015)*; Pittsburgh Steelers (2015)*
- * Offseason or practice squad member only
- Stats at Pro Football Reference

Dominique Brown (born December 27, 1991) is an American former football running back. He played college football at Louisville.

== Early life ==
Brown played high school football at the quarterback position for Winton Woods High School in Cincinnati, Ohio. As a senior in 2009, he rushed for 1,998 yards and 32 touchdowns and also had 723 passing yards and seven passing touchdowns. He led Winton Woods to the Ohio Division II state championship and was named the Division II state offensive co-player of the year in 2009. Brown initially committed to play college football for Cincinnati, but withdrew his commitment when coach Brian Kelly left the school for Notre Dame in December 2009.

== Louisville ==
Brown played for Louisville from 2010 to 2014. As a freshman in 2010, he began his career as a quarterback, but was used only in the Wildcat formation. He totaled 59 rushing yards on 20 carries, threw one incomplete pass, caught three passes for 32 yards, and had 52 return yards on kickoffs.

With Teddy Bridgewater taking over as Louisville's quarterback in 2011, Brown was relegated to the third string early in the season. He lined up for the first time at running back against Kentucky and was used thereafter as a ball carrier. He rushed for 533 yards on 140 carries, caught 16 passes for 98 yards, and scored five touchdowns.

After missing the 2012 season with a knee injury, Brown became Louisville's lead running back for the 2013 Louisville Cardinals football team that compiled a 12–1 record and was ranked No. 15 in the final AP and Coaches polls. He rushed for a career-high 137 yards and two touchdowns against Houston on November 16 and then broke his personal record with 143 yards in Louisville's victory over Miami (FL) in the 2014 Citrus Bowl. For the 2013 season, he rushed for 825 yards on 163 carries, caught 24 passes for 228 yards, and scored nine touchdowns.

As a senior in 2014, he rushed for 378 yards on 96 carries. At the end of the 2014 season, he was invited to play in the East–West Shrine Bowl.

== Professional career ==
=== Tampa Bay Buccaneers ===
Brown was signed as an undrafted rookie by the Tampa Bay Buccaneers on May 5, 2015. He was waived by the Buccaneers on August 30, 2015.

=== Pittsburgh Steelers ===
On September 6, 2015, Brown was signed to the Pittsburgh Steelers' practice squad.
