= Caroline Okeden =

British novelist

- Born: 1821; Bath
- Died: 12 October 1903 (aged 81–82)
- Occupation: Novelist
- Spouse(s): George Fitzmaurice Parry Okeden
- Parent(s): Charles Rhys; Harriet Horton

Caroline Elizabeth Okeden (1821 – 12 October 1903) was a British novelist who published under the name Mrs. Fitzmaurice Okeden.

Caroline Okeden was born on 1821 in Bath. She was the daughter of British Army Major Charles Rhys and Harriet Horton, granddaughter of Sir Watts Horton, 2nd Baronet. In 1846, she married George Fitzmaurice Parry Okeden, a civil engineer and nephew of Arthur Capell, 6th Earl of Essex. They had two children, George Algernon Parry Okeden, who disappeared in South Africa, and Grace Harriet Parry-Okeden King.

Okeden published two novels, Felicia's Dowry (1866) and Philip Vaughan's Marriage (1869). In Felicia's Dowry, Adele and Kate resolve to write a novel, with the latter declaring "Besides, all women write novels now, whether they can or they can't." In its particularly negative review, The Athenaeum wrote that this sentence should be put on the title page as a "warning".

Caroline Okeden died on 12 October 1903.

== Bibliography ==
- Felicia's Dowry. 3 vol. London: Hurst and Blackett, 1866.
- Philip Vaughan's Marriage: A Novel. 2 vol. London: T. C. Newby, 1869.
