= Dave Parry =

Dave Parry is a sound and lighting designer specializing in music venues. He has been involved in the designing of nightclubs, with the majority of his completed projects being UK based. Dave Parry lives between New Delhi, India and London, UK, where he owns and runs his own company Most Technical.

== Early life and beginning career ==
Dave Parry began work in UK club venues by controlling the famous lighting rig at seminal rave spot The Camden Palace (now called Koko (venue)) in 1982, later citing it as the 'best lighting rig he'd ever worked with'.

Soon after, at the Ministry of Sound, he was taken on by Hector Dewar around the time he had just formed his lighting and sound design company, "Most Technical". Parry then designed his original and award-winning lighting scheme. During his time, he formed a bond with Dave Hayden from Outboard Electronics, whom he would later go on to work with on the design of one of the world's most advanced night clubbing arenas.

He designed Rehab in Leeds for Chris Edwards and worked with Mike Greive and Paul Crawford to design the Sub Club in Glasgow.

== European venues ==
His work at major UK clubs such as Fabric (club), Ministry of Sound, India's first superclub, and Elevate in New Delhi has provided many nightclubs.

At fabric, Dave Parry worked closely with owner Keith Reilly to ensure that the club could offer visitors something they'd never experienced before. The most notable developments Dave introduced were the first body kinetic dance floor (which became an infamous feature of the venue) as well as a timax 3d sound system. The club was since voted the best club in the world for 9 years running.

At matter, Dave worked alongside Dave Green, owner of Pixel Addicts, where together they brought pixel mapping (tiling and texture mapping of images) to the venue. matter also boasted a 75,000W BodyKinetic dancefloor from Djenerate, a huge Martin Audio and Void Acoustics sound system, and master control via an Avolites desk. The matter was described by "night" magazine as the world's most advanced nightclub.

Dave also pioneered the sound and lighting system at Wagg Club in Paris, which is restaurateur Terence Conran's first club, found under his Paris-based restaurant Alcazar.

== Current projects ==
In India, he set up Most Technical India. Dave pioneered lighting and sound design at Elevate in New Delhi, India's first super club. A few years later Shroom, Agni, and Kitty Su followed. In December 2011, Dave worked alongside Blacksheep Design on Liverpool's newest club: The Playground featured in the E4 reality series 'Desperate Scousewife'. In the past few years, Dave's work has also seen him building clubs in Moscow, Thailand, and China where Most Technical has built 3 of the top 5 best dance clubs.

== Personal life ==
Dave Parry lives with his French wife in Dorset.

== Accolades ==
Dave Parry's light and sound design work has attracted his media attention - including being featured in The Face (magazine), The Sunday Times Magazine, and The Daily Telegraph. He was also featured on the BBC's Tomorrow's World program talking about the world-beating sound system he designed at fabric.

Elevate has been voted best nightclub 5 years in a row whilst fabric remained in the top 10 for many consecutive years.

in 2009 Night Magazine declared Dave Parry to be the most important club innovator of the decade. Night Magazine has also been awarded B.E.D. An award to every nightclub Dave Parry has designed.

== Sources ==
- https://web.archive.org/web/20100429212606/http://www.mondodr.com/report/interviews/189098/interview_dave_parry.html
- https://web.archive.org/web/20110718084138/http://www.ukslc.org/index.php?view=article&catid=103
- http://www.nightmagazine.co.uk/venues/MatterGreenwich.htm
- Article title |Page
- http://www.avolites.org.uk/avonews/press/2008/matter.htm
- http://www.garrettaxford.co.uk/resources/downloads/press
- https://web.archive.org/web/20090402214948/http://www.audioprointernational.com/news/740/Grand-opening-of-Londons-Matter-nightclub
- http://www.digidesign.com/index.cfm?langid=100&navid=49&itemid=35849
- https://web.archive.org/web/20091118032950/http://www.digitalproductionme.com/listarticle-3-content_management-14/
- http://www.outboard.co.uk/pages/archive.html
- https://web.archive.org/web/20080530212145/http://www.arabianbusiness.com/section/allinterviews/media_marketing?limit=20&limitstart=40
- http://www.bdonline.co.uk/story.asp?storycode=3141384
- https://web.archive.org/web/20090402214948/http://www.audioprointernational.com/news/740/Grand-opening-of-Londons-Matter-nightclub
- http://www.bangonpr.com/pr_detail.php?id=289 http://www.garrett-axford.co.uk/resources/downloads/press
- https://pro-music-news.com/html/15/e80910ma.htm
