= James Parry =

James Parry is the name of:

- James Parry (artist) (1795–1877), British painter and engraver
- James "Kibo" Parry (born 1967), American Usenetter and prankster
- James Parry, one of seven men convicted and hanged for the 1838 Myall Creek massacre of Australian aborigines

== See also ==
- James Perry (disambiguation), a list of people
