= David Parry (English cricketer) =

English cricketer

David Parry (born 9 December 1956) was an English cricketer. He was a right-handed batsman and right-arm medium-pace bowler who played for Cheshire. He was born in Middlewich, Cheshire.

Parry, who played two matches in the English Estates Trophy and a single match in the Minor Counties Championship, made a single List A appearance for the team, in the 1985 NatWest Trophy, against Yorkshire. Parry did not bat in the match, and took bowling figures of 0–32.
