= Dave Perry (law enforcement) =

Dave Perry is a Canadian private investigator and a retired Toronto police detective. He was a lead investigator in many complex and high-profile cases within the Homicide Squad, the Sex Crimes Unit, and the Sexual Assault Squad. He also served as head of the Toronto Police Juvenile Task Force. Media outlets regularly sought Dave's opinion on domestic and international cases during his 27-year career with the Toronto Police Service.

After retiring from the Toronto Police Service with the rank of Detective Sergeant, Perry took a faculty position as an adjunct professor at Durham College, instructing students on Public and Private Investigations, Police Foundations, and Law and Security Administration.

Perry founded Investigative Solutions Network (ISN) Inc. in 2006. The company provides crime investigations, consulting, and training to law enforcement agencies.

Dave works as a volunteer for Durham Region's ProAction Cops & Kids Youth Program.

Perry continues to be quoted as a crime expert by news sources.
