= Thomas Parry =

Thomas Parry may refer to:

- Thomas Parry (Comptroller of the Household) (c. 1515–1560), serving Queen Elizabeth I of England
- Thomas Parry (ambassador) (1541–1616), English MP, ambassador to France and Chancellor of the Duchy of Lancaster
- Thomas Parry (writer) (1904–1985), Welsh language literary scholar and author
- Thomas Parry (Chennai merchant) (1768–1824), Welsh merchant in Chennai, India
- Thomas Parry (bishop) (1795–1870), Bishop of Barbados, 1842–1869
- Thomas Parry (Boston MP) (1818–1879), MP for Boston three times
- Thomas Gambier Parry (1816–1888), English artist and art collector
- Tom Parry (politician) (1881–1939), Welsh Liberal politician, lawyer and soldier
- Tom Parry (economist), Australian economist and public servant
- Tom Parry (footballer) (1880–1946), Oswestry United F.C. and Wales international footballer
- Tom Parry (comedian) (born 1980), member of the sketch comedy troupe Pappy's
- Tom Parry (American football) (1923–2017), college football coach
