= Richard Parry =

Richard Parry may refer to:

- Richard Parry (bishop) (1560–1623), Bishop of St. Asaph
- Richard Parry (director) (born 1967), film director
- Richard Lloyd Parry (born 1969), British foreign correspondent
- Richard Reed Parry (born 1977), musician, member of indie band Arcade Fire
- Rick Parry (born 1955), former chief executive of Liverpool F.C.
- Dick Parry (born 1942), English saxophonist

== See also ==
- Richard Parry-Jones (1951–2021), chief technical officer
- Richard Perry (disambiguation)
