= Kevin Parry =

Kevin Parry may refer to:

- Kevin Parry (Australian businessman) (1933–2010), Australian businessman
- Kevin Parry (British businessman) (born 1962), British business executive
