= Charles Parry =

Charles Parry may refer to:

- Charles Christopher Parry (1823–1890), British-American botanist and mountaineer
- Sir Charles Hubert Parry (1848–1918), English composer
- Charles de Courcy Parry (died 1948), British Chief Constable
- Charlie Parry (1870–1922), Welsh footballer with Everton F. C.
- Charles Henry Parry (1779–1860), English physician and writer
