= Derrick Lott =

American gridiron football player (born 1990)

Profile
- Position: Defensive tackle

Personal information
- Born: June 18, 1990 (age 36); Kennesaw, Georgia, U.S.
- Listed height: 6 ft 4 in (1.93 m)
- Listed weight: 305 lb (138 kg)

Career information
- High school: Kennesaw (GA) North Cobb
- College: Chattanooga
- NFL draft: 2015: undrafted

Career history
- Tennessee Titans (2015)*; Tampa Bay Buccaneers (2015–2016)*; Philadelphia Eagles (2016)*; Oakland Raiders (2016)*; Saskatchewan Roughriders (2017)*; Detroit Lions (2017)*
- * Offseason or practice squad member only

Derrick Lott (born June 18, 1990) is an American former professional football defensive tackle. He played college football at Chattanooga.

== Professional career ==
=== Tennessee Titans ===
Lott signed with the Tennessee Titans as an undrafted free agent on May 11, 2015. He was waived on August 30, 2015.

=== Tampa Bay Buccaneers ===
On September 16, 2015, Lott was signed to the Tampa Bay Buccaneers' practice squad. He spent time on and off the Buccaneers' practice squad throughout the 2015 season before signing a reserve/future contract with the team on January 5, 2016. On April 29, 2016, Lott was waived by the Buccaneers.

=== Philadelphia Eagles ===
On May 24, 2016, Lott was signed by the Philadelphia Eagles. On July 14, 2016, the Eagles waived Lott.

=== Oakland Raiders ===
On July 29, 2016, Lott was signed by the Oakland Raiders. On September 3, 2016, Lott was released by the Raiders as part of final roster cuts.

=== Saskatchewan Roughriders ===
In January 2017, Lott was signed to the Saskatchewan Roughriders of the Canadian Football League. After participating in a mini-camp held in April, Lott was subsequently released on May 1, 2017.

=== Detroit Lions ===
On August 27, 2017, Lott was signed by the Detroit Lions. He was waived by the Lions on September 2, 2017 and was signed to the practice squad the next day, only to be released the following day.
