= Albert Parry (academic) =

Russian-born American historian (1901–1992)

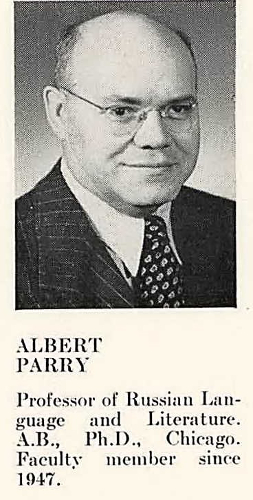
Albert Parry, 1950

Albert Parry (February 24, 1901 – May 4, 1992) was a Russian-born American historian.

== Biography ==
Parry, born Abraham Josipovich Paretsky in Rostov-on-Don, Russia, was professor of Russian civilization and language at Colgate University. After the Russian Revolution he became a sailor in the Russian Merchant Marine and emigrated in 1921 to the United States, settling in New York City's Greenwich Village. There he wrote for periodicals. At the University of Chicago, he earned an A.B. in 1935, and his Ph.D. in history in 1938, taught there briefly and at Northwestern University. He was editor of Consolidated Book Publishers during his in Chicago years and a research director of radio broadcasts for the Chicago Sun. Parry founded Colgate University's Russian studies program, the first undergraduate program of its kind in America. In 1971, Parry retired from Colgate. He died in Los Angeles at age 91.

== Selected publications ==
- Garrets and Pretenders: A History of Bohemianism in America (1933)
- Tattoo: Secrets of a Strange Art as Practised among the Natives of the United States (1933)
- Whistler's Father (1939)
- The New Class Divided: Science and Technology versus Communism (1966)
- The Russian Scientist (1973)
- Terrorism: From Robespierre to Arafat (1976)

== Sources ==
- Who's Who in America
