= Bernard Blake =

American football player (born 1992)

Profile
- Position: Cornerback

Personal information
- Born: February 28, 1992 (age 34); Austin, Texas
- Listed height: 5 ft 11 in (1.80 m)
- Listed weight: 178 lb (81 kg)

Career information
- High school: Bastrop (TX)
- College: Colorado State
- NFL draft: 2015: undrafted

Career history
- Green Bay Packers (2015)*
- * Offseason or practice squad member only
- Stats at Pro Football Reference

Bernard Maurice Blake Jr. (born February 28, 1992) is an American former football cornerback. He played college football at Colorado State. Blake was signed by the Green Bay Packers as an undrafted free agent in 2015, before a latent brain aneurysm caused his release.

== Professional career ==
Pre-draft measurables
Height	Weight	40-yard dash	10-yard split	20-yard split	20-yard shuttle	Three-cone drill	Vertical jump	Broad jump	Bench press
5 ft 11 in (1.80 m)	178 lb (81 kg)	4.49 s	1.56 s	2.56 s	4.26 s	7.12 s	37.5 in (0.95 m)	10 ft 7 in (3.23 m)	9 reps
All values are from Pro Day

After going undrafted in the 2015 NFL draft, Blake signed with the Green Bay Packers on May 8, 2015. He was released by the Packers on July 24, 2015, due to suffering a latent intracranial aneurysm.

== Personal life ==
After the end of his football career, Blake founded a positional football training company in Austin, Texas.
