= James Perry House =

Historic house in Massachusetts, United States

- U.S. National Register of Historic Places
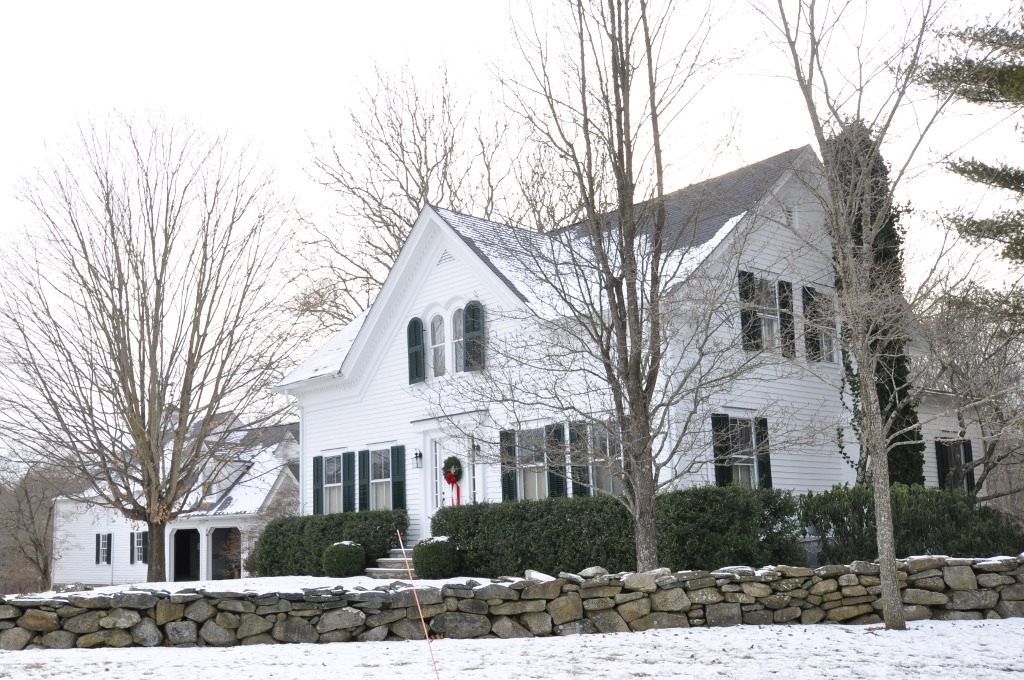

- Location within Massachusetts Location within the United States
- Location: Rehoboth, Massachusetts
- Coordinates: 41°51′41″N 71°15′26″W
- Area: 13 acres (5.3 ha)
- Built: 1870
- Architectural style: Greek Revival, Italianate
- MPS: Rehoboth MRA
- NRHP reference No.: 83000701
- Added to NRHP: June 6, 1983

The James Perry House is a historic house at 121 Perryville Road in Rehoboth, Massachusetts. This 1 1/2-story cottage was built c. 1860 by James Perry, a wealthy manufacturer, and is one of Rehoboth's finest Italianate houses. Its center entry is flanked by sidelight windows and pilasters, topped by a narrow entablature. The eaves are bracketed and modillioned, and there are round-arch windows in the gables. The land on which it was built belonged to members of the Perry family from 1831, and overlooked a mill operated by the family.

The house was listed on the National Register of Historic Places in 1983.
