= Lee Ward =

Canadian academic

Lee Ward is a Canadian academic currently teaching political science at Baylor University in Waco, Texas, and formerly Alpha Sigma Nu Distinguished Professor of Campion College at the University of Regina. He is an associate professor of political studies. His key research interests are the history of political philosophy and American political thought.

== Education ==
He first achieved a Bachelor of Arts from the University of Toronto. He went on to achieve a master's degree from Brock University and, finally, a PhD. from Fordham University

== Personal life ==
He is married to Ann Ward, a professor of philosophy and political studies at the University of Regina.

== Publications ==
He has contributed to both the Canadian Journal of Political Science and the American Journal of Political Science. Most recently, he published the political research work "John Locke and Modern Life". He has also recently coedited "The Ashgate Research Companion to Federalism" with his wife Ann. Other works include "The Relation between Politics and Philosophy in Plato's Apology of Socrates", "Nobility and Necessity: The Problem of Courage in Aristotle's Nicomachean Ethics", and "Montesquieu on Federalism and Anglo-Gothic Constitutionalism".

=== Selected published works ===
- Natural Right and Political Philosophy: Essays in Honor of Catherine and Michael Zuckert. (Co-edited with Ann Ward). South Bend, IN: University of Notre Dame Press, 2013.
- John Locke and Modern Life. Cambridge and New York: Cambridge University Press, 2010.
- The Ashgate Research Companion to Federalism. Aldershot, UK: Ashgate Publishing Co., 2009. (Co-edited with Ann Ward)
- The Politics of Liberty in England and Revolutionary America. Cambridge and New York: Cambridge University Press, 2004.
