= David Parry (footballer) =

English footballer (1948–2024)

Personal information
- Full name: David Edward Parry
- Date of birth: 11 February 1948
- Place of birth: Southport, England
- Date of death: 25 August 2024 (aged 76)
- Position: Winger

Youth career
- Blackpool

Senior career*
Years	Team	Apps	(Gls)
1967–1968	Tranmere Rovers	3	(0)
1968–1969	Halifax Town	2	(0)
1969	Wigan Athletic	17	(2)
- * Club domestic league appearances and goals

David Edward Parry (11 February 1948 – 25 August 2024) was an English footballer, who played as a winger in the Football League for Tranmere Rovers and Halifax Town. He also played 17 Northern Premier League games for Wigan Athletic. Parry died from complications of Alzheimer's disease on 25 August 2024, at the age of 76.
