= David Parry (American football) =

American football player (born 1992)

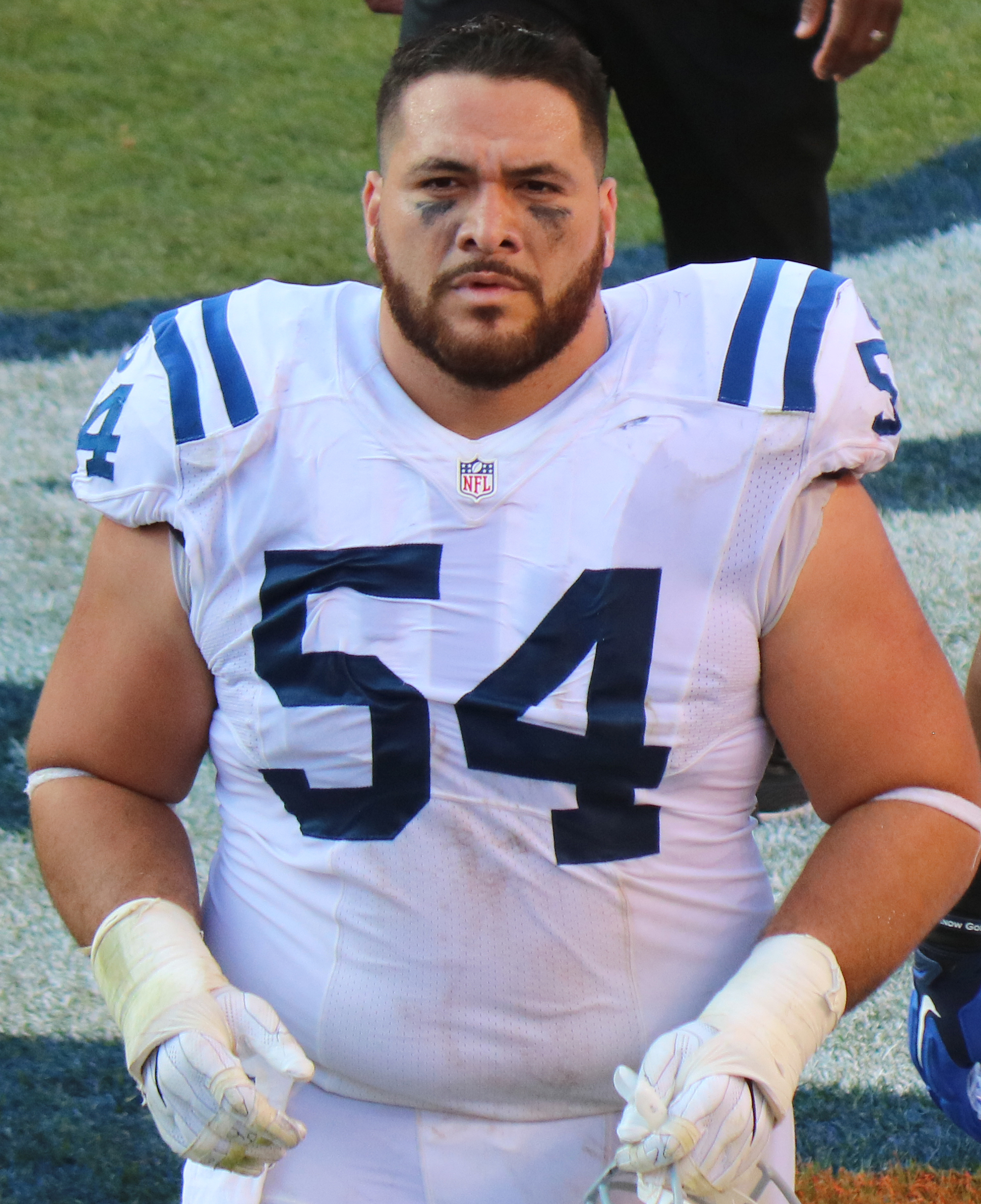
- Parry with the Indianapolis Colts in 2016

No. 54, 58, 95
- Position: Defensive tackle

Personal information
- Born: March 7, 1992 (age 34); Carrollton, Texas, U.S.
- Listed height: 6 ft 2 in (1.88 m)
- Listed weight: 317 lb (144 kg)

Career information
- High school: Linn-Mar (Marion, Iowa)
- College: Stanford
- NFL draft: 2015: 5th round, 151st overall pick

Career history
- Indianapolis Colts (2015–2016); New Orleans Saints (2017); Minnesota Vikings (2018); New England Patriots (2019)*; Arizona Cardinals (2021)*
- * Offseason or practice squad member only

Career NFL statistics
- Games played: 36
- Games started: 32
- Total tackles: 83
- Sacks: 5.0
- Stats at Pro Football Reference

David Robert Parry (born March 7, 1992) is an American former professional football player who was a defensive tackle in the National Football League (NFL). He played college football for the Stanford Cardinal, and was selected by the Indianapolis Colts in the fifth round of the 2015 NFL draft.

== Early life and college ==
Raised in Daly City, California, before moving to Iowa, Parry attended Linn-Mar High School in Marion, Iowa, and was a three-year varsity letterwinner at offensive and defensive tackle. He then played for the Stanford Cardinal, and in 2014 was a finalist for the Burlsworth Trophy.

== Professional career ==
=== Indianapolis Colts ===
On May 2, 2015, Parry was selected in the fifth round of the 2015 NFL draft by the Indianapolis Colts with the 151st overall pick. He agreed to terms with the Colts on May 6. Parry started all 16 games in the 2015 season, recording 31 tackles and 1 sack. Parry started all 16 games during the 2016 season recording 47 tackles and 3 sacks, including a game-saving sack against the Packers.

On September 2, 2017, Parry was waived by the Colts.

=== New Orleans Saints ===
On September 4, 2017, Parry was signed to the practice squad of the New Orleans Saints. He was promoted to the active roster on September 20, 2017. He was placed on injured reserve on September 27, 2017.

=== Minnesota Vikings ===
On May 16, 2018, Parry signed with the Minnesota Vikings. After playing in both of the Vikings' first two games of the 2018 season, recording one sack against the Green Bay Packers in Week 2, Parry was released on September 19, 2018. He was re-signed on October 16, 2018. He was released again on October 27, 2018.

=== New England Patriots ===
On January 9, 2019, Parry signed a reserve/future contract with the New England Patriots. He was released during final roster cuts on August 30, 2019.

=== Arizona Cardinals ===
On January 6, 2021, Parry signed a reserve/future contract with the Arizona Cardinals. He was released on August 24, 2021.

== Personal life ==
Parry's mother is of American Samoan descent and served in the United States Army.

On February 25, 2017, Parry was arrested in Scottsdale, Arizona on suspicion of robbery, auto theft, criminal damage, resisting arrest and DUI charges. He was later charged with felony robbery, felony unlawful use of transportation and misdemeanor threats. On April 26, 2017, he pled guilty one count each of disorderly conduct and attempted unlawful means of transportation. Sentencing was set for May 31, 2017; he is expected to be sentenced to supervised probation.
