= Perry (surname) =

Origin
- Languages: Old English & Welsh
- Meaning: One who dwells by a pear tree (Geographical); quarryman (English); Son of Harry (Welsh)
- Region of origin: England & Wales

Perry is a surname with several distinct origins. In England, deriving from the Old English pyrige ("pear tree"), referring to one who dwells by a pear tree, while in Wales Perry, along with Parry, arose as patronymics, via a shortening of "ap Harry" (son of Harry). There are some variants in the Romance languages (derived from Latin): Pereira, Pereyra, Pereyro, Pereiro, Pereiros, Pereire, Perera, Perer, Perero, Pereros; the Norman French perrieur (quarry), possibly referring to a quarryman. Perry was recorded as a surname from the late 16th century in villages near Colchester, Essex, East England, such as Lexden and Copford. Perry has some resemblance with the Portuguese common surname Pereira, which means pear tree in the Portuguese language. Because of that, many Portuguese immigrants to the US (especially Massachusetts and the San Francisco Bay Area) chose to Americanize their surname Pereira to Perry. The Italian surname, Perri, related to Peter, is also often Americanized to Perry.

== Geographical distribution ==
=== United Kingdom, Empire, and Dependencies ===
At the time of the United Kingdom Census of 1881, the frequency of the surname Perry was highest in the following counties:

1. Somerset (1: 312)
2. Essex (1: 347)
3. Staffordshire (1: 396)
4. Rutland (1: 405)
5. Worcestershire (1: 458)
6. Hertfordshire (1: 576)
7. Bedfordshire (1: 676)
8. Shropshire (1: 698)
9. Cornwall (1: 699)
10. Devon (1: 746)

As of 2014, the frequency of the surname was highest in the following countries and territories:

1. Guernsey (1: 1,147)
2. French Polynesia (1: 1,231)
3. Wales (1: 1,277)
4. United States (1: 1,332)
5. Bermuda (1: 1,367)
6. Jamaica (1: 1,538)
7. Isle of Man (1: 1,564)
8. Israel (1: 1,572)
9. New Zealand (1: 1,588)
10. Liberia (1: 1,597)

=== United States and Territories ===
As of 2014, 67.0% of all known bearers of the surname Perry were residents of the United States. The frequency of the surname was higher than national average in the following U.S. states:

1. Rhode Island (1: 563)
2. Maine (1: 652)
3. Vermont (1: 658)
4. West Virginia (1: 660)
5. North Carolina (1: 699)
6. Tennessee (1: 715)
7. Kentucky (1: 797)
8. Massachusetts (1: 801)
9. New Hampshire (1: 828)
10. Alabama (1: 857)
11. Mississippi (1: 961)
12. South Carolina (1: 1,003)
13. Arkansas (1: 1,025)
14. Virginia (1: 1,040)
15. Louisiana (1: 1,076)
16. Oklahoma (1: 1,081)
17. Utah (1: 1,107)
18. D.C. (1: 1,116)
19. Georgia (1: 1,153)
20. Indiana (1: 1,169)
21. Ohio (1: 1,190)
22. Michigan (1: 1,215)
23. Connecticut (1: 1,235)
24. Maryland (1: 1,243)
25. Idaho (1: 1,302)
26. Alabama (1: 1,321)

The frequency of the surname was highest (over 10 times the national average) in the following U.S. counties:

1. McCreary County, Ky. (1: 49)
2. Slope County, N.D. (1: 59)
3. Bertie County, N.C. (1: 61)
4. Franklin County, N.C. (1: 88)
5. Chowan County, N.C. (1: 102)
6. Daggett County, Utah (1: 105)
7. Warren County, N.C. (1: 106)
8. Morgan County, Ky. (1: 112)
9. Wheatland County, Mont. (1: 112)
10. Vance County, N.C. (1: 115)
11. Wolfe County, Ky. (1: 119)
12. Nash County, N.C. (1: 124)
13. Hertford County, N.C. (1: 129)
14. Brown County, Ill. (1: 129)
15. Washington County, Colo. (1: 130)

== People ==
- Adam Perry (drummer) (born 1969), member of the bands A and Bloodhound Gang
- Adam Perry (rugby league) (born 1979), Australian rugby player
- Alf Perry (1904–1974), English golfer
- Alfred Perry, co-founder of the Douglas Hospital in Montreal, Quebec, Canada
- Andre Perry, member of the American rock band The Lonelyhearts
- Andrew Perry (disambiguation), multiple people
- Anne Perry (1938–2023), English author
- Anne C. Perry, American politician
- Antoinette Perry (1888–1946), American actress and director; founder American Theatre Wing, annual Antoinette Perry Awards, Tony Awards
- Arlis Perry (1955–1974), American female murder victim
- Astrid Perry-Indermaur, Australian activist
- A. T. Perry (born 1999), American football player
- Aulcie Perry (born 1950), retired American-Israeli professional basketball player
- Aylesworth Perry (1860–1956), the sixth and longest-serving Commissioner of the Royal Canadian Mounted Police
- Barbara Perry (disambiguation), multiple people
- Bertha Perry Ronalds (1874–1963), American philanthropist and socialite
- Bob J. Perry (1932–2013), American homebuilder and major political contributor
- Bonnie Perry (born 1962), American Anglican bishop in Michigan
- Bradley Steven Perry (born 1998), American actor known for playing Gabe Duncan on the Disney Channel Original Series Good Luck Charlie
- Brianna Perry (born 1992), American female rapper
- Caitríona Perry (born 1980), Irish television journalist and newsreader
- Carlotta Perry (1839/48–1914), American writer, poet
- Catherine D. Perry (born 1952), American judge
- Catherine Joy Perry (born 1985), professional name Lana, American model and professional wrestling figure (valet and wrestler)
- Charles Perry (disambiguation), multiple people
- Chris Perry (disambiguation), multiple people
- Clark M. Perry (1872–1936), American politician
- Corey Perry (born 1985), Canadian hockey player
- Darren Perry (born 1968), American football player and NFL coach
- Dave Perry (born 1966), English game show co-commentator
- David Perry (disambiguation), multiple people
- Dayn Perry (born 1972), American sportswriter
- Dewayne E. Perry, American engineer
- E. J. Perry (American football) (born 1998), American football player
- Edmund Perry, 1985 murder victim
- Edmund Perry (New Jersey politician) (1825–1878), American politician
- Edward Perry (industrialist) (1800–1869), English tinplate works master and twice Mayor of Wolverhampton
- Edward A. Perry (1831–1889), governor of Florida
- Eleanor Perry (1914–1981), screenwriter and author
- Elizabeth James-Perry (born 1973), American artist and restoration ecologist
- Elliott Perry (1884–1972), American philatelist
- Ellyse Perry (born 1990), Australian cricketer and footballer
- Elwood L. Perry (1915–2005), American expert on freshwater fishing
- Emelia Perry (born 1992), American paratriathlete
- Enoch Wood Perry, Jr. (1831–1915), American artist
- Flo Perry (born 1992), British feminist artist and writer
- Frank Perry (1930–1995), American film director
- Fred Perry (disambiguation), multiple people
- Gaylord Perry (1938–2022), American baseball player
- Geoffrey Perry (1927–2000), English physics teacher and amateur astronomer
- George Perry (disambiguation), multiple people
- Gillian Perry (botanist) (1943–2011), Australian
- Glenn Perry, Australian writer
- Grayson Perry (born 1960), English artist
- Guy Perry, American actor
- Hal Perry (basketball) (1933–2009), American basketball player
- Hal Perry (politician) (born 1965), Canadian politician
- Harold Perry (disambiguation), multiple people
- Harry Perry (disambiguation), multiple people
- Henry Perry (disambiguation), multiple people
- Imani Perry (born 1972), American interdisciplinary scholar and author
- Isaiah Perry (1854–1911), Methodist minister in South Australia, father of engineer Frank Perry and footballer Charlie Perry
- Ivor Perry (1904–?), Welsh footballer
- Jack Perry (born 1997), American professional wrestler; son of Luke Perry
- Jack Perry (disambiguation), multiple people, several other people
- James Perry (disambiguation), multiple people
- Jason Perry (disambiguation), multiple people
- Jeffrey Perry, multiple people
- Jim Perry (baseball) (born 1935), American Major League Baseball pitcher, brother of pitcher Gaylord Perry
- Jim Perry (television personality) (1933–2015), Canadian-American television personality (stage name)
- Jimmy Perry (1923–2016), English scriptwriter
- Joe Perry (American football) (1927–2011), American footballer
- Joe Perry (musician) (born 1950), American guitarist of the rock band Aerosmith (Americanized form of Pereira)
- Joe Perry (snooker player) (born 1974), from England
- Joel Perry (born 1985), Australian rules footballer
- John Perry (musician) (born 1952), English guitarist and writer
- John Perry (disambiguation), multiple people
- John Holliday Perry Sr. (1881–1952), American lawyer and publisher
- Jonathan Perry (disambiguation), multiple people
- Joseph Perry (disambiguation), multiple people
- Josephine Perry (1881–1943), American politician
- Juan Perry (born 1957), Peruvian congressman
- Katherine Perry (1897–1983), American stage and film actress.
- Katie Perry (born 1980), Australian fashion designer
- Katy Perry (born 1984), American pop singer Katheryn Elizabeth Hudson
- Kenny Perry (born 1960), American golfer
- Kimberly Perry (born 1983), American musician, lead vocalist of The Band Perry
- Kyle Perry (born 1986), English footballer
- L. Glenn Perry (1944–1998), Chief Accountant of the SEC
- L. Tom Perry (1922–2015), an Apostle in The Church of Jesus Christ of Latter-day Saints
- Lee "Scratch" Perry (1936–2021), Jamaican reggae producer
- Lincoln Perry, birth name of Stepin Fetchit (1902–1985), American comedian and actor
- Linda Perry (born 1965), American singer, songwriter and record producer
- Lorinda Perry (1884–1951), American economist, professor, lawyer
- Luke Perry (1966–2019), American actor
- Madison S. Perry (1814–1865), governor of Florida
- Malcolm Perry (disambiguation), multiple people
- Mark Perry (disambiguation), multiple people
- Mario Perry (born 1963), American football player
- Mary Perry Smith (1926–2015), American mathematics educator
- Matthew Perry (disambiguation), multiple people
  - Matthew Perry (1969–2023), American-Canadian actor
  - Matthew C. Perry (1794–1858), American naval officer
  - Matt Perry (rugby union) (born 1977), English rugby union footballer
- Michael Perry (disambiguation), multiple people
- Neil Perry (born 1957), Australian chef, restaurateur, author and television presenter
- Neil Perry, American musician, member of The Band Perry
- Nora Perry (writer) (1831–1896), American poet, journalist
- Niamh Perry (born 1990), Northern Irish singer
- N'Kosi Perry (born 1998), American football player
- Oliver Hazard Perry (1785–1819), American naval officer
- Oliver Henry Perry (1815–1882), American politician
- Paul Perry (disambiguation), multiple people
- Peter Perry (disambiguation), multiple people
- Phil Perry (born 1957), musician
- Philippa Perry (born 1957), English psychotherapist and author
- Phyllis Alesia Perry (born 1961), American journalist and author
- Rain Perry, American singer-songwriter
- Ralph Barton Perry (1876–1957), American philosopher and educator
- Reggie Perry (basketball) (born 2000), American basketball player
- Rich Perry (born 1949 or 1955), American jazz musician and saxophonist
- Richard Perry (1942–2024), American music producer
- Richard C. Perry (born 1955), American hedge investor in Perry Capital
- Rick Perry (born 1950), U.S. Secretary of Energy (2017–2019)
- Robert H. Perry, yacht designer
- Roderick Perry II (born 1997), American football player
- Roger Perry (1933–2018), American film and television actor
- Roland Hinton Perry (1870–1941), American artist
- Ross Perry (born 1990), Scottish footballer
- Rufus L. Perry (1834–1895), American educator, journalist, and minister
- Russet Perry, Virginia State Senator
- S. D. Perry (born 1970), American novelist
- Samuel Perry (disambiguation), multiple people
- Scott Perry (disambiguation), multiple people, multiple people
- Seamus Perry (born 1967), British academic and writer
- Shane Perry (born 1977), Australian rugby league player
- Shaun Perry (born 1978), Bristol and England rugby union player
- Shenay Perry (born 1984), American tennis player
- Sion L. Perry (c. 1793–1874), justice of the Supreme Court of Alabama
- Steve Perry (disambiguation), multiple people
- Suzi Perry (born 1970), English television presenter
- Tamayo Perry (1975–2024), American professional surfer, lifeguard and actor
- Ted Perry (1931–2003), British record executive
- Thomas Perry (disambiguation), multiple people
- Todd Perry (American football) (born 1970), NFL player
- Todd Perry (ice hockey) (born 1986), Canadian
- Todd Perry (tennis) (born 1976), Australian
- Tom Perry (disambiguation), multiple people
- Travis Perry (born 2005), American basketball player
- Trent Perry (born 2005), American basketball player
- Tyler Perry (born 1969), American actor
- Tylor Perry (born 2001), American basketball player
- Walter Perry (disambiguation), multiple people
- Whitall Perry (1920–2005), American writer
- William Perry (disambiguation), multiple people
- Zac Perry, American politician
- Zoe Perry (born 1983), American actress

== See also ==
- Perry (given name)
- Perry (disambiguation)
- Pereira (surname)
- Perri (disambiguation)
