= Chamber Made =

Australian arts organisation based in Melbourne

Chamber Made, formerly known as Chamber Made Opera, is an Australian arts organisation based in Melbourne, creating work operating at the intersections of music, sound and contemporary performance.

Formed in 1988 by theatre director and librettist Douglas Horton, it was Australia's only full-time company exclusively devoted to the commissioning and presentation of contemporary chamber opera by living artists. After taking up the artistic directorship in 2010, David Young commissioned and presented twelve new Australian operas, many of which were created as part of the company's "Living Room Opera" series. In 2013, Tim Stitz was appointed as Creative Director, leading a new company model consisting of four Artistic Associates. Since 2014 an overt focus on chamber opera has evolved into a broader remit of creating works that re-imagine how music and performance can converge. In 2017, the company restructured again and Tamara Saulwick was appointed Artistic Director.

Chamber Made works with established artists and emerging professionals. The company also engages performers from different disciplines and non-traditional music and performance backgrounds. Their productions are highly interdisciplinary, incorporating sophisticated composition and experimental performance practice.

The company has forged partnerships with Punctum, Limerick City of Culture, In Between Time Festival, Arts Centre Melbourne, RMIT University, La Mama Theatre, Aphids, Speak Percussion, Melbourne Recital Centre, the Victorian Opera, the Victorian Writers' Centre, The Wheeler Centre, Fed Square, Bell Shakespeare, Rawcus, Malthouse Theatre, New Music Network, and the Australian Music Centre.

The company has multi-year, re-current funding from Creative Victoria and has an enduring support base from philanthropic and earned income. Chamber Made is based in a studio managed by the City of Melbourne's Meat Market tenancy program.

== Company history ==
Chamber Made Opera was founded in 1988 by Artistic Director Douglas Horton and General Manager Stephen Armstrong. The company quickly established itself as a force in the Australian arts industry, presenting many acclaimed works (see below for list of productions), winning awards, and touring nationally and internationally. Horton was the librettist for many of the company’s works; he stepped down as Artistic Director in March 2009, after 21 years.

In 2010 composer David Young was appointed the role of Artistic Director, a position he held until December 2013. Young lead the company through a period of rejuvenation and transformation, pioneering the innovative Living Room Opera series (see below).

In early 2013 CMO announced a new company structure would be installed following the departure of David Young, headed by new Creative Director Tim Stitz, who appointed a team of four Artistic Associates to join him in the next phase of the company's life. In 2017, Tamara Saulwick moved from the role of Artistic Associate to Artistic Director.

Past staff include Artistic Director David Young, Creative Director / CEO Tim Stitz, Artistic Associate Sarah Kriegler, Artistic Associate Christie Stott, Artistic Associate Erkki Veltheim, General Managers Robina Burton and Geoffrey Williams, Resident Director Margaret Cameron, Resident Conductor Brett Kelly, Caroline Lee, and the late Jacqueline (Jacqui) Everitt, designer.

At the 2026 Art Music Awards group won the Excellence in Experimental Practice and Victorian State Luminary Award.

== Productions ==
Only first productions are listed

- 1988 The Heiress, music: Donald Hollier, text after Henry James' novel Washington Square
- 1989 Recital, music: David Chesworth, Puccini, Mozart et al., text: Douglas Horton and Helen Noonan
- 1990 The Fall of the House of Usher, music: Philip Glass, text: Arthur Yorinks after Edgar Allan Poe
- 1991 Greek, music: Mark-Anthony Turnage, text: Steven Berkoff
- 1991 Sweet Death, music: Andree Greenwell, text: Abe Pogos after Claude Tardat
- 1992 The Cars That Ate Paris, musical improvisation, text by Douglas Horton after Peter Weir
- 1992 Lacuna, music: David Chesworth, text: Douglas Horton
- 1993 Improvement: Don Leaves Linda, music & text: Robert Ashley
- 1993 Medea, music: Gordon Kerry, text: Justin Macdonnell after Seneca
- 1994 The Two Executioners, music: David Chesworth, text: Douglas Horton after Fernando Arrabal's Les Deux Bourreaux
- 1995 Tresno, music & text: Jacqui Rutten
- 1995 The Burrow, music: Michael Smetanin, text: Alison Croggon
- 1997 Wide Sargasso Sea, music: Brian Howard, text Brian Howard after Jean Rhys
- 1997 Fresh Ghosts, music: Julian Yu, text: Glenn Perry after Lu Xun
- 1998 Dr Forbes Will See You Now, music: Stephen Ingham, text: Douglas Horton
- 1998 Matricide – The Musical, music: Elena Kats-Chernin, text: Kathleen Mary Fallon
- 1999 Eight Songs For A Mad King, music: Peter Maxwell Davies, text: Randolph Stow
- 2000 Gauguin (a synthetic life), music: Michael Smetanin, text: Alison Croggon
- 2000 Teorema, music: Giorgio Battistelli, scenario after Pier Paolo Pasolini
- 2002 Slow Love, music: Stevie Wishart, text: Richard Murphett
- 2002 Motherland, music: Dominique Probst, text: Le Quy Duong
- 2003 The Possessed, music: Julian Yu, text: Glenn Perry
- 2003 Phobia, music: Gerard Brophy, text: Douglas Horton, in homage to Alfred Hitchcock
- 2003 Walkabout, music & text: Richard Frankland after Nicolas Roeg
- 2004 The Charcoal Club (aka Burning Embers), music & text: Richard Frankland
- 2006 Corruption, music: Sasha Stella, text: Ania Walwicz after Elisa Evers
- 2006 The Hive, music: Nicholas Vines, text: Sam Sejavka
- 2007 Crossing Live, music: Bryony Marks, text: Matthew Saville
- 2008 The Children's Bach, music: Andrew Schultz, text: Glenn Perry based on Helen Garner's novella
- 2010 Another Lament, music: Ida Duelund Hansen
- 2010 The Itch, music: Alex Garsden
- 2010 Exile, the world's first iPad opera, music: Helen Gifford
- 2011 Minotaur: The Island, music: David Young, text: Margaret Cameron
- 2011 Dwelling Structure, by Madeleine Flynn and Tim Humphrey, libretto Cynthia Troup
- 2011 Ophelia Doesn't Live Here Anymore, music: Darrin Verhagen, director: Daniel Schlusser
- 2012 The Box, by Fritz Hauser with Boa Baumann, libretto Willoh S. Weiland
- 2012 PM – An incidental video opera, by Peter Lambropoulos
- 2012 The Minotaur Trilogy, music: David Young, text: Margaret Cameron
- 2013 Turbulence, music: Juliana Hodkinson, libretto: Cynthia Troup
- 2013 Opera – therapea, by David Young, Margaret Cameron, Hellen Sky, Deborah Kayser, Jane Refshuage
- 2013 Between Lands and Longings, by Zierle & Carter
- 2013 Opera for a small mammal, written and performed by Margaret Cameron
- 2014 Wake, conceived by Maeve Stone and John Rodgers, composed by Tom Lane
- 2014 Another Other, created and performed by Erkki Veltheim, Sabina Maselli, Natasha Anderson, and Anthony Pateras
- 2015 Captives of the City, co-created by Chamber Made and Lemony S Puppet Theatre
- 2016 Permission to Speak, created by Tamara Saulwick and Kate Neal, performed by Gian Slater, Georgie Darvidis, Josh Kyle and Edward Fairlie
- 2017 Between 8&9, created by Australian and Chinese artists in a collaborative process led by Madeleine Flynn and Tim Humphrey
- 2018 Dybbuks, conceived and directed by Samara Hersch
- 2019 Diaspora, created by Robin Fox and collaborators
- 2020 Dragon Ladies Don't Weep, created by Tamara Saulwick, Nick Roux and Kok Heng Leun, performed by Margaret Leng Tan
- 2021 SYSTEM_ERROR, co-created and performed by Tamara Saulwick and Alisdair Macindoe, directed by Lucy Guerin, with Melanie Huang as data visualisation artist
- 2022 My Self in That Moment, led by Tamara Saulwick, composed by Peter Knight (musician), performed by Jessica Aszodi, Alice Hui-Sheng Chang, and Tina Stefanou

== Awards ==
- 1992 Myer Group Arts Award – Chamber Made Opera
- 1994 The Age Performing Arts Awards – Most Outstanding Fringe Performance: The Two Executioners
- 1995 A Creative Artist Fellowship [aka a 'Keating', after the then Prime Minister, Mr Paul Keating] - AD/CEO Douglas Horton, for services to contemporary Australian opera
- 2002 Green Room Awards – Best New Score: Slow Love
- 2002 Green Room Awards – Best Lighting Design: Motherland
- 2006 Green Room Awards – Best Opera Production: The Hive
- 2007 Helpmann Awards – Best Opera Direction: Douglas Horton for The Hive
- 2007 Green Room Awards – Best New Australian Work: Crossing Live,
- 2007 Green Room Awards - Best Performance, New Form: Luke Elliott in Crossing Live
- 2013 Art Music Awards – Victorian Performance of the Year, Excellence by an Organisation: The Minotaur Trilogy
- 2016 Green Room Awards - Puppetry Performance: Captives of the City
- 2016 Green Room Awards - Design & Realisation in Contemporary Performance: Captives of the City
- 2017 Art Music Awards - Victorian Performance of the Year: Permission to Speak
- 2018 Green Room Awards - Sound Performance: Between 8&9
- 2018 Art Music Awards - Excellence in Experimental: Between 8&9
- 2020 Green Room Awards - Visual Design: Diaspora
- 2020 Green Room Awards - Best Production: Diaspora
- 2021 Music Theatre NOW: Dybbuks
- 2021 Art Music Awards - Work of the Year Dramatic: Dragon Ladies Don't Weep

== Discography ==
- 2001 Wicked Voice includes excerpts from Lacuna and The Two Executioners (Chesworth/Horton), ABC Classics
- 2007 Medea (Kerry/Macdonnell), ABC Classics
- 2012 Another Lament (Ida Duelund), Chamber Made Opera Records
- 2013 Winterreise (Ida Duelund), Chamber Made Opera Records
- 2013 The Minotaur Trilogy box set, Chamber Made Opera Records

== Living Room Operas ==
From 2010 to 2014, a series of domestic-scale chamber operas were commissioned and developed for presentation in living rooms of residential houses.

The Living Room Opera Series involved artists and musicians from a range of styles and backgrounds. This series aimed to give the audience new, chamber operas in close proximity.

In 2010 new works by composer Alex Garsden, Rawcus Theatre Company, and the Quiver Ensemble were commissioned and presented in a range of domestic settings with investment by individual donors. The Series represents a mobile and scalable model with support from private philanthropy.

Productions that featured in the series were The Itch (2010), Another Lament (2010), Dwelling Structure (2011), Ophelia Doesn't Live Here Anymore (2011), Minotaur The Island (2011), The Box (2012), PM An incidental Video Opera (2012), Between Lands and Longings (2013), Turbulence (2013), and Wake (2014).

== The Venny ==
From 2012-2018, CMO partnered with the Kensington Adventure Playground (The Venny), to deliver a community outreach program for young people. Each year the company enabled professional artists to work with the children and staff of The Venny to develop and present a creative project exploring the children's interests and teaching them creative skills whilst building a sense of fortitude and community.
