= Michael Perry =

Michael Perry or Mike Perry may refer to:

== Arts, entertainment, and media ==
- Alan and Michael Perry (born 1961), miniature wargame sculptors
- Michael Perry (author) (born 1964), writer and a humorist
- Michael Perry (gardener) (born 1979), TV gardener and author
- Michael Perry (software engineer), software designer and writer
- Michael R. Perry (born 1963), American television producer, television writer and screenwriter
- Michael W. Perry, radio personality on KSSK-FM
- Mike Perry (artist) (born 1981), artist and animator
- Mike Perry (DJ) (born 1983), Swedish DJ and producer
- Mike Perry (game developer) (born 1969), game developer at Maxis and Zynga

== Religion ==
- Michael Perry (hymnwriter) (1942–1996), English hymnwriter
- Michael Perry (priest) (1933–2015), Anglican priest and author
- Michael Perry (Franciscan) (born 1954), American Franciscan friar

== Sports ==
- Mike Perry (fighter) (born 1991), American fighter
- Michael Perry (athlete) (born 1977), Australian triple jumper
- Michael Perry (basketball) (born 1958), American college basketball coach
- Michael Perry (footballer) (born 1944), Australian rules player
- Michael Alexander Perry (born 1964), known as Mick Perry, English footballer
- Michael Dean Perry (born 1965), football player

== Others ==
- Michael J. Perry (born 1945), American legal scholar and writer
- Michael James Perry (1982–2010), American convicted murderer, executed in 2010
- Michael Owen Perry (born 1954), American murderer, subject of the US Supreme Court case Perry v. Louisiana
- Michael Sydney Perry (born 1934), British businessman

== See also ==
- Michael Perry Botanic Reserve, in Stonyfell, South Australia
- Perry (surname)
