= Joseph Berry =

Joseph Berry, Joseph Barry, and other variations may refer to:

== Sports ==
- Joe Barry (born 1970), American football coach
- Joe Berry (catcher) (1872–1961), American baseball player
- Joe Berry (pitcher) (1904–1958), American baseball player
- Joe Barry (polo), American polo player
- Joe Berry (second baseman) (1894–1976), American baseball player
- Joe Berry (rugby league) (born 1974), British rugby league footballer
- Joseph Berry (cricketer) (1829–1894), English cricketer
- Joe Barry (rugby union) (1876–1961), South African rugby union player
- Joe Berry (Australian footballer) (born 2006), Australian rules footballer drafted in the 2025 AFL draft

== Others ==
- Joe Barry (singer) (1939–2004), American singer
- Joseph Barry (born 1940), American real estate developer
- Joe Barry (director-general) (1932–2022), Director-General of RTÉ
- Joseph Berry (RAF officer) (1920–1944), English fighter pilot
- Joseph Flintoft Berry (1856–1931), Canadian-born bishop of the Methodist Episcopalian Church

== See also ==
- Joel Berry II (born 1995), American basketball player
- Joseph Berryer (1897–1978), Belgian diplomat
- Joe Barry Carroll (born 1958), American basketball player
- Joseph Perry (disambiguation)
