= Charles Perry =

Charles Perry, sometimes nicknamed Charlie or Chuck, may refer to:

== Politics and law ==
- Charles T. Perry (1812–1872), American politician; mayor of Hoboken, New Jersey
- Charles Perry (Canadian politician) (1818–1876), Canadian businessman and member of parliament
- Charles B. Perry (1855–1940), American politician, speaker of the Wisconsin State Assembly
- Charles D. Perry (1907–1964), American politician, New York state senator
- Charles Perry (Texas politician) (born 1962), American politician, Texas state senator

== Sports ==
- Charlie Perry (footballer, born 1866) (1866–1927), English footballer
- Charlie Perry (Australian rules footballer) (1888–1961), Australian rules footballer
- Charles Perry (basketball) (1921–2001), American basketball player

== Others ==
- Charles Perry (traveller) (1698–1780), English traveller and medical writer
- Charles Perry (bishop) (1807–1891), English Australian cleric, first Anglican bishop of Melbourne
- Charles Elliott Perry (1871–1937), New Zealand Anglican clergyman
- Charles Stuart Perry (1908–1982), New Zealand librarian
- Charles Perry (author) (1924–1969), African American novelist, author of Portrait of a Young Man Drowning
- Charles O. Perry (1929–2011), American artist, known for large scale public sculptures
- Charles R. Perry (1934–2005), American construction industry leader and businessman in Florida
- Chuck Perry (1937–1999), American academic, founding president of Florida International University
- Charles Perry (food writer) (born 1941), American culinary historian, journalist, and translator of the Baghdad Cookery Book
