= John Parry =

John Parry may refer to:

== Musicians ==
- John Parry (Bardd Alaw) (1776–1851), Welsh harpist and composer, and father of John Orlando Parry
- John Parry (harpist) (c1710–1782), celebrated blind harpist from Wales
- John Parry (Mormon) (1789–1868), early Welsh convert to Mormonism and first conductor of the Mormon Tabernacle Choir
- John Parry (actor) (1810–1879), Welsh actor, singer-pianist and comedian, and son of John Parry (Bardd Alaw)
- John Parry, member of Bonzo Dog Doo-Dah Band

== Politicians ==
- John Parry (1518-1584), MP for Carmarthen Boroughs (UK Parliament constituency)
- John Parry (1724–1797), Welsh Member of Parliament for Caernarvonshire 1780–90
- John Edmund Parry (born 1946), member of the Canadian House of Commons, 1984–1988

== Sports ==
- John Parry (American football official) (born 1965), National Football League game official from 2000 to 2018
- John Parry (golfer) (born 1986), English professional golfer

== Others ==
- John Parry (bishop) (died 1677), Bishop of Ossory 1672–1677
- John Parry (chemist) (1863–1931), british chemist
- John Parry (editor) (1812–1817) Welsh editor of the Encyclopaedia Cambrensis
- John Franklin Parry Hydrographer of the Navy 1914-1919
- John Humffreys Parry (1816–1880), English barrister and serjeant-at-law, son of the antiquary
- John Humffreys Parry (antiquary) (1786–1825), Welsh barrister and antiquarian
- J. H. Parry (1914–1982), maritime historian
- John P.M. Parry MBE (1937?-2023), British entrepreneur and engineer

== See also ==
- Jack Parry (disambiguation)
- John Perry (disambiguation)
