= Fred Berry (disambiguation) =

Fred Berry (1951–2003) was an American actor and dancer.

Fred Berry may also refer to:

- Fred Berry (ice hockey) (born 1956), Canadian ice hockey player
- Fred Berry (cricketer) (1910–1989), English cricketer
- Fred T. Berry (1887–1933), American naval commander
  - USS Fred T. Berry
- Fred Berry (politician) (1949–2018), American politician and disability activist

== See also ==
- Fred Barry (disambiguation)
- Fred Perry (disambiguation)
