= John H. Perry =

John H. Perry may refer to:

- John Hoyt Perry (1848–1928), lawyer, judge, and politician in Connecticut
- John Holliday Perry Sr. (1881–1952), media tycoon whose newspapers included the Palm Beach Post
