= Jeffrey Perry =

Jeffrey Perry may refer to:

- Jeff Perry (American actor) (born 1955), American actor of stage, television and film
- Jeffrey Perry (British actor) (1948–2012), British stage and screen actor
- Jeff Perry (politician) (born 1964), former member of the Massachusetts House of Representatives
- Jeffrey B. Perry, American independent scholar, historian, and labor activist

== See also ==
- Geoffrey Perry (1927–2000), physicist
