= Frederick Barry =

Frederick Barry may refer to:

- Frederick L. Barry (1897–1960), bishop of Albany in the United States
- Frederick G. Barry (1845–1909), U.S. Representative from Mississippi
- Fred Barry (1948–2016), American football player

== See also ==
- Fred Berry (disambiguation)
