= Paul Perry =

Paul Perry may refer to:

- Paul Perry (author) (fl. 1980s–2020s), American writer
- Paul Perry (cinematographer) (1891–1963), American cinematographer
- Paul Perry (horse trainer) (born 1949), Australian racehorse trainer

== See also ==
- Perry (surname)
- Paul Perri (born 1953), American-Canadian actor
