= Lostant, Illinois =

- Village
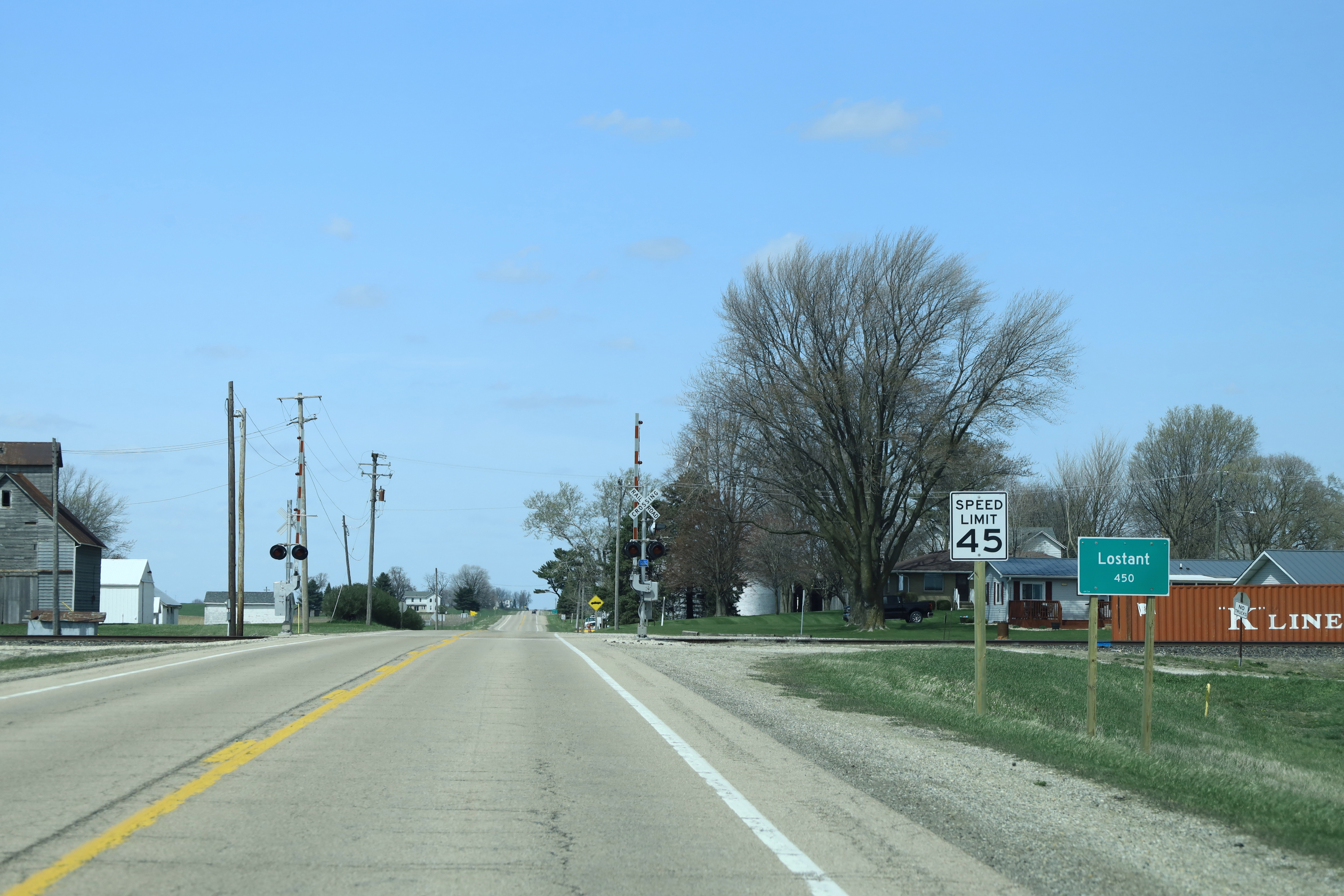
- Etymology: Countess of Lostant, wife of Baron Mercier who visited Illinois in 1861
- Location in LaSalle County, Illinois
- Coordinates: 41°07′14″N 89°04′06″W
- Country: United States
- State: Illinois
- County: LaSalle
- Township: Hope

Area
  - Total: 1.13 sq mi (2.93 km^{2})
  - Land: 1.13 sq mi (2.93 km^{2})
  - Water: 0 sq mi (0.00 km^{2})
- Elevation: 692 ft (211 m)

Population (2020)
  - Total: 423
  - Density: 375/sq mi (144.6/km^{2})
- Time zone: UTC-6 (CST)
  - Summer (DST): UTC-5 (CDT)
- ZIP code: 61334
- Area code: 815
- FIPS code: 17-44823
- GNIS feature ID: 2399189
- Website: www.villageoflostant.com

Lostant is a village in LaSalle County, Illinois, United States. The population was 423 at the 2020 census, down from 498 at the 2010 census. It is part of the Ottawa Micropolitan Statistical Area.

== History ==
A post office has been in operation at Lostant since 1861. The village was named for Lostant Mercier, the wife of French diplomat Henri Mercier. Horatio N. Boshell (1872–1933), Illinois state representative and physician, was born in Lostant.

== Geography ==
Lostant is located in southwestern LaSalle County at 41°8′32″N 89°3′41″W (41.142127, -89.061384). The village limits extend south to the Marshall County line.

Illinois Route 251 runs through the western side of the village, leading north 5 miles (8 km) to Tonica and south 7 miles (11 km) to Wenona. Illinois Route 18 passes through the southern extension of Lostant; it leads east 12 miles (19 km) to Streator and west 16 miles (26 km) to Henry. Interstate 39 runs along the southwestern edge of the village, with access from Exit 41 (IL 18). I-39 leads north 15 miles (24 km) to LaSalle and south 44 miles (71 km) to Normal.

According to the 2021 census gazetteer files, Lostant has a total area of 1.13 square miles (2.93 km^{2}), all land.

== Demographics ==
Historical population
Census	Pop.	Note	%±
1880	363		—
1890	378		4.1%
1900	480		27.0%
1910	458		−4.6%
1920	911		98.9%
1930	413		−54.7%
1940	399		−3.4%
1950	432		8.3%
1960	460		6.5%
1970	465		1.1%
1980	539		15.9%
1990	510		−5.4%
2000	486		−4.7%
2010	498		2.5%
2020	423		−15.1%
U.S. Decennial Census

As of the 2020 census there were 423 people, 184 households, and 114 families residing in the village. The population density was 374.34 inhabitants per square mile (144.53/km^{2}). There were 208 housing units at an average density of 184.07 per square mile (71.07/km^{2}). The racial makeup of the village was 95.04% White, 0.24% Native American, 0.47% Asian, 0.24% Pacific Islander, 1.18% from other races, and 2.84% from two or more races. Hispanic or Latino of any race were 3.55% of the population.

There were 184 households, out of which 29.3% had children under the age of 18 living with them, 45.11% were married couples living together, 10.87% had a female householder with no husband present, and 38.04% were non-families. 22.83% of all households were made up of individuals, and 13.59% had someone living alone who was 65 years of age or older. The average household size was 3.09 and the average family size was 2.52.

The village's age distribution consisted of 25.7% under the age of 18, 11.7% from 18 to 24, 27.5% from 25 to 44, 20.1% from 45 to 64, and 15.1% who were 65 years of age or older. The median age was 34.4 years. For every 100 females, there were 117.4 males. For every 100 females age 18 and over, there were 106.0 males.

The median income for a household in the village was $64,643, and the median income for a family was $77,778. Males had a median income of $45,500 versus $30,313 for females. The per capita income for the village was $32,931. About 1.8% of families and 8.2% of the population were below the poverty line, including 7.6% of those under age 18 and 8.6% of those age 65 or over.

== School ==
- Lostant Elementary Grade School
