= Walter Perry (disambiguation) =

Walter Perry (1921–2003) was a Scottish academic and vice chancellor of the Open University.

Walter Perry may also refer to:

- Walter Copland Perry (1814–1911), British author and barrister-at-law
- Walter Perry (footballer) (1868–1928), English footballer
- Walter Perry (baseball) (1915–1980), American Negro league catcher
- Wally Perry, Australian rules footballer

== See also ==
- Walter and Perry, characters from the television series Home Movies
- Walter Perrie (born 1949), Scottish poet
- Walter Berry (disambiguation)
