= William Roy Smith =

American historian (1876–1938)

- Born: 1876
- Died: 1938 (aged 61–62)
- Spouse: Marion Parris Smith

Academic background
- Education: University of Texas, Columbia University
- Thesis: South Carolina as a Royal Province, 1710-1776 (1902)
- Doctoral advisor: William Archibald Dunning

Academic work
- Discipline: Historian
- Sub-discipline: American History

William Roy Smith (1876–1938) was an American academic historian.

== Career ==
Smith studied first at the University of Texas (A.B. 1897, A.M. 1898), and went on to complete a Ph.D. at Columbia University in 1902, as a student of William Archibald Dunning. He joined the faculty at Bryn Mawr College in 1902, and became professor of history in 1914. He married Marion Parris on 11 June 1912 in Manhattan, New York. He died in Bryn Mawr Hospital in February 1938.

Smith's essay "Negro Suffrage in the South", published in Studies in Southern History and Politics (1914), argued that the disenfranchisement of Black voters had been necessary in the late 19th century, but looked forward to a time when "a steadily increasing number of negroes, who are qualified by intelligence and character, will be readmitted to the voting ranks". Smith's justifications for post-Reconstruction disenfranchisement led W. E. B. Du Bois to list him in Black Reconstruction (1935) among "authors [that] believe the Negro to be sub-human and congenitally unfitted for citizenship and the suffrage".

== Publications ==
- "The Quarrel between Governor Smith and the Provisional Government of the Republic", Quarterly of the Texas State Historical Association 5/4 (1902), pp. 269–346
- South Carolina as a Royal Province, 1710-1776 (Macmillan, 1903)
- "Negro Suffrage in the South", in Studies in Southern History and Politics Inscribed to William Archibald Dunning (Columbia University Press, 1914), pp. 229–256
