= Horatio N. Boshell =

American physician and politician

Horatio N. Boshell (January 8, 1872–June 1, 1933) was an American physician and politician.

Boshell was born in Lostant, LaSalle County, Illinois. He went to Illinois Wesleyan University from 1889 to 1892. Boshell graduated from Rush Medical College in 1895. He practice medicine and surgery in Melvin, Illinois. Boshell served in the United States Medical Corps during World War I and was commissioned a major. Boshell served on the Melvin school board and was a Republican. Boshell also served on the Melvin Board of Trustees and served as president of the village board. Boshell served in the Illinois House of Representatives in 1923 and 1924. Boshell and his wife were killed in an automobile accident near Indian Oaks, Illinois north of Kankakee, Illinois. They were returning home from Chicago, Illinois.
