= Melvin, Illinois =

Melvin
- Village
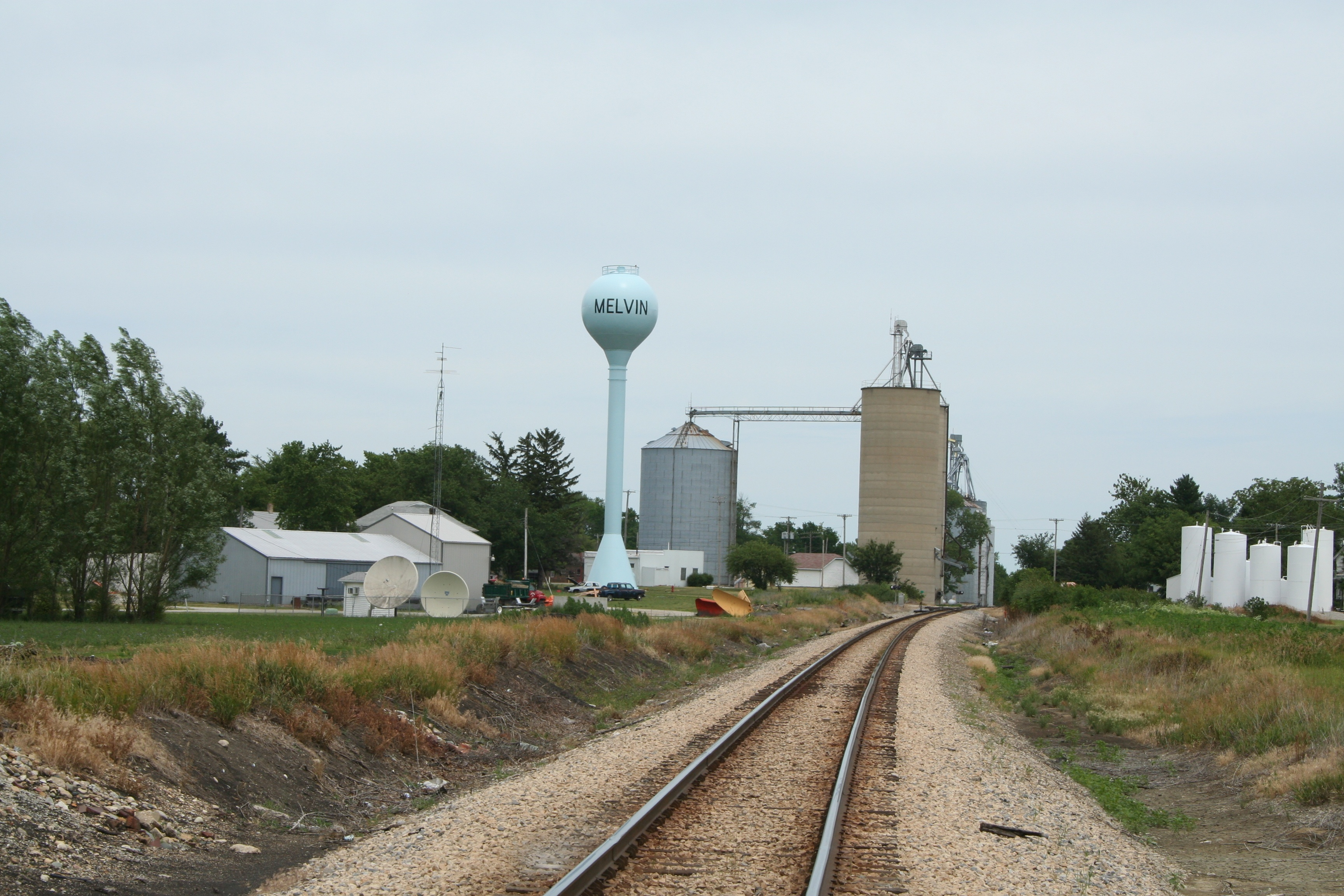
- Melvin, Illinois water tower and grain elevator

- Location of Melvin in Ford County, Illinois.
- Coordinates: 40°34′13″N 88°14′56″W
- Country: United States
- State: Illinois
- County: Ford

Area
  - Total: 0.35 sq mi (0.90 km^{2})
  - Land: 0.35 sq mi (0.90 km^{2})
  - Water: 0 sq mi (0.00 km^{2})
- Elevation: 804 ft (245 m)

Population (2020)
  - Total: 416
  - Density: 1,202.1/sq mi (464.13/km^{2})
- Time zone: UTC-6 (CST)
  - Summer (DST): UTC-5 (CDT)
- ZIP code: 60952
- Area code: 217
- FIPS code: 17-48268
- GNIS feature ID: 2399309
- Website: www.melvinill.com

Melvin is a village in Ford County, Illinois, United States. The population was 416 at the 2020 census.

== Geography ==
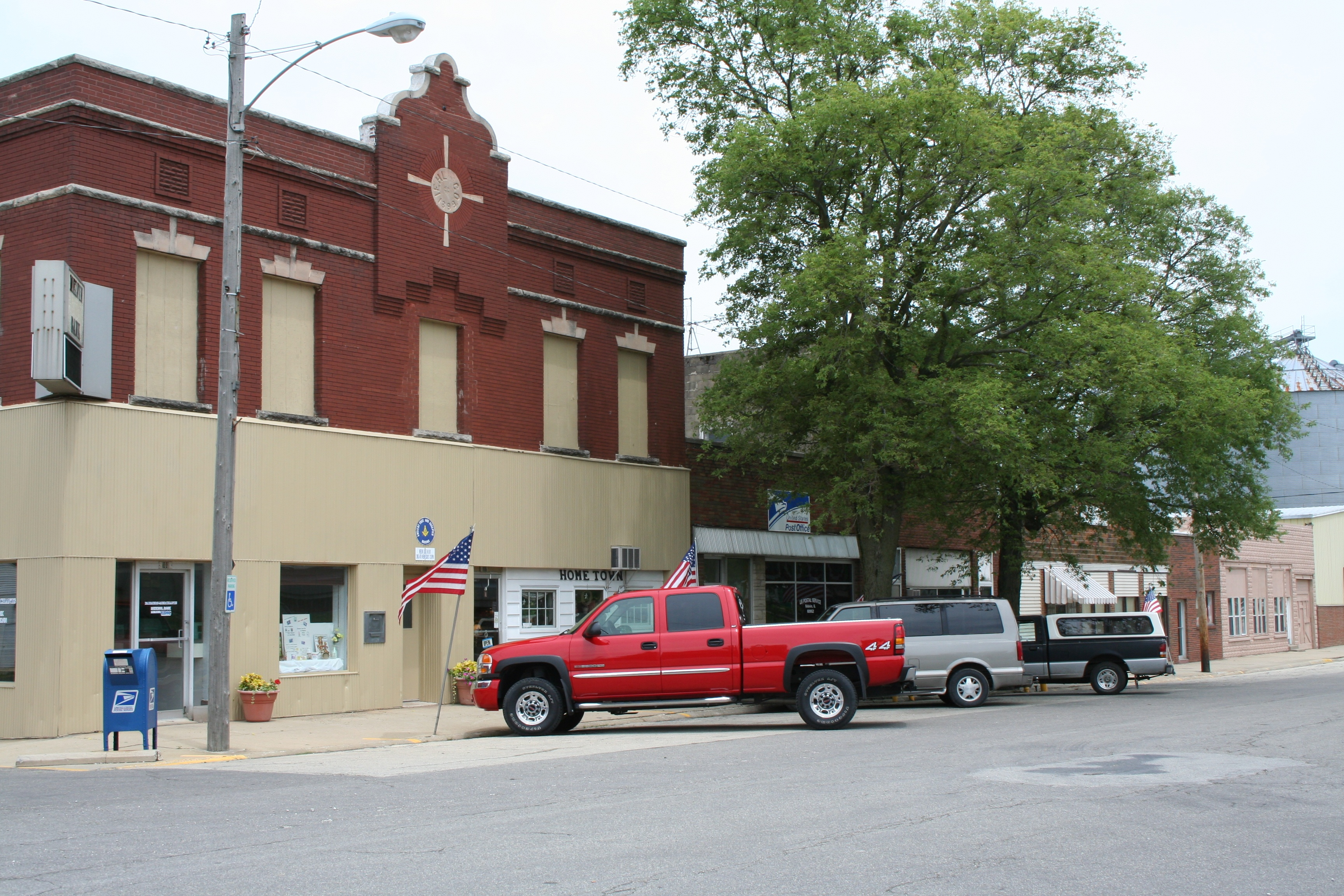
Melvin Illinois Bank and Post Office.

According to the 2021 census gazetteer files, Melvin has a total area of 0.35 square miles (0.91 km^{2}), all land.

== Demographics ==
Historical population
Census	Pop.	Note	%±
1890	491		—
1900	550		12.0%
1910	509		−7.5%
1920	540		6.1%
1930	499		−7.6%
1940	470		−5.8%
1950	535		13.8%
1960	559		4.5%
1970	492		−12.0%
1980	519		5.5%
1990	466		−10.2%
2000	465		−0.2%
2010	452		−2.8%
2020	416		−8.0%
U.S. Decennial Census

As of the 2020 census there were 416 people, 158 households, and 104 families residing in the village. The population density was 1,202.31 inhabitants per square mile (464.21/km^{2}). There were 201 housing units at an average density of 580.92 per square mile (224.29/km^{2}). The racial makeup of the village was 89.90% White, 0.00% African American, 0.48% Native American, 0.96% Asian, 0.00% Pacific Islander, 1.20% from other races, and 7.45% from two or more races. Hispanic or Latino of any race were 5.77% of the population.

There were 158 households, out of which 35.4% had children under the age of 18 living with them, 41.14% were married couples living together, 15.19% had a female householder with no husband present, and 34.18% were non-families. 29.75% of all households were made up of individuals, and 13.92% had someone living alone who was 65 years of age or older. The average household size was 2.98 and the average family size was 2.51.

The village's age distribution consisted of 28.0% under the age of 18, 8.3% from 18 to 24, 25.1% from 25 to 44, 24% from 45 to 64, and 14.6% who were 65 years of age or older. The median age was 35.8 years. For every 100 females, there were 105.7 males. For every 100 females age 18 and over, there were 104.3 males.

The median income for a household in the village was $46,071, and the median income for a family was $48,750. Males had a median income of $39,500 versus $20,000 for females. The per capita income for the village was $28,528. About 23.1% of families and 22.3% of the population were below the poverty line, including 27.9% of those under age 18 and 1.7% of those age 65 or over.

== Notable people ==
- Leslie Cornelius Arends, U.S. congressman
- Horatio N. Boshell, physician and Illinois state representative
- Josephine Perry, Illinois state representative
- Lorinda Perry, economist, professor, lawyer
