= Jack Perry (disambiguation) =

Jack Perry (born 1997) is an American professional wrestler.

Jack Perry may also refer to:

- Jack Perry (clown) (1916–2006), Australian clown in duo Zig and Zag
- Jack Perry, host of The Jack Perry Show

== See also ==
- Jack Perri, basketball coach
- Jackie Perry (1924–2018), English rugby league footballer
- Jack Parry (disambiguation)
- John Perry (disambiguation)
