= Chris Parry =

Chris Parry may refer to:

- Chris Parry (lighting designer) (1952–2007), theatrical lighting designer
- Chris Parry (Royal Navy officer) (born 1953)
- Chris Parry (producer) (born 1949), founder of Fiction Records

== See also ==
- Chris Perry (disambiguation)
