= Andrew Perry =

Andrew Perry may refer to:

- Andrew Perry (Hampshire cricketer) (born 1976), former English cricketer for Hampshire
- Andrew Perry (Sussex cricketer) (born 1984), former English cricketer for Sussex

== See also ==
- Andrew Perry Allgood (1816–1882), American businessman
