= Jason Perry =

Jason Perry may refer to:

- Jason Perry (safety) (born 1976), American football safety in the National Football League
- Jason Perry (arena football) (born 1984), American football player who plays for the Jacksonville Sharks
- Jason Perry (baseball) (born 1980), Major League Baseball outfielder
- Jason Perry (footballer) (born 1970), Welsh footballer
- Jason Perry (politician), British politician
- Jason Perry (singer) (born 1969), English singer-songwriter and member of A
- Jason Perry, former member of Plus One
