= Marion Parris Smith =

American economist

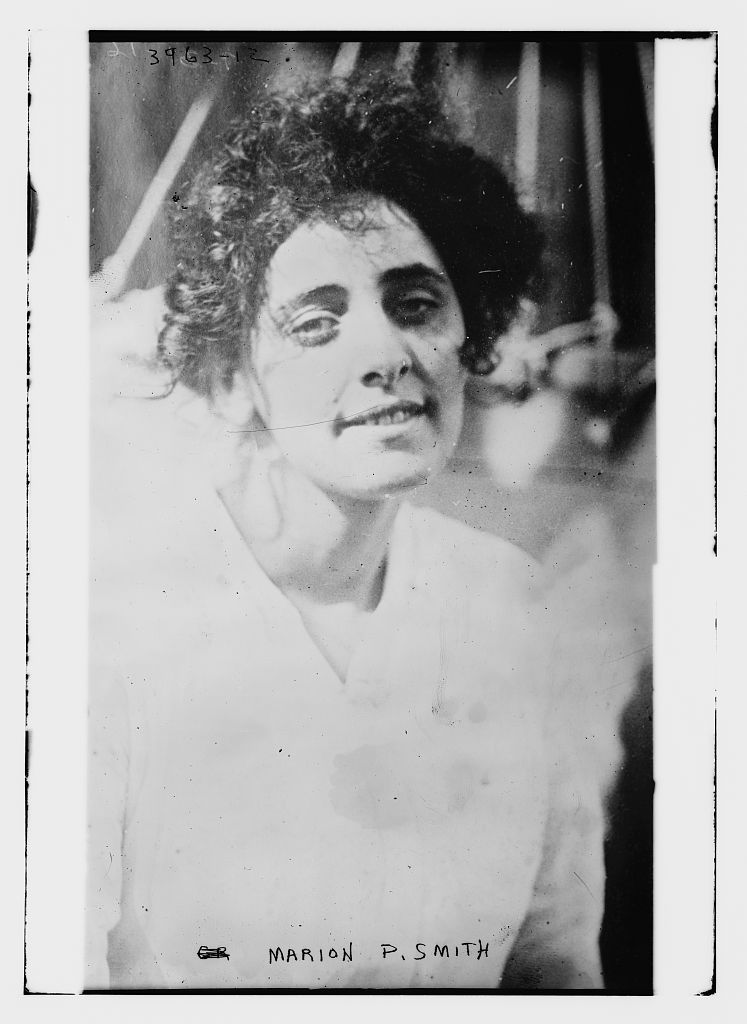
Smith in 1916

Marion Parris Smith (1879–1964) was a professor of economics at Bryn Mawr College.

== Biography ==
She was born as Marion Parris on 22 May 1879 in Manhattan to Edward Lowden Parris (1837–1921) and Mary Ida Dubois (1850–1936)

She married William Roy Smith (1876–1938) on 11 June 1912 in Manhattan, New York.

In 1936 she was named to the Pennsylvania Education Board by George Howard Earle III.

== Works ==
- Millinery as a Trade for Women. With Lorinda Perry (1916)
- Chinese Optimism: A nature-philosophy that led to faith in human goodness and inspired serene art. (1924)
- What constitutes a liberal democracy? (1925)
- A Democratic Program: Address before the Democratic Women's Luncheon Club of Philadelphia. (1926)
- Recent Economic Heresies: Address before the Executive Committee of the Democratic Women's Luncheon Club of Philadelphia. (1935)
