= The Children's Bach (opera) =

2008 chamber opera by Andrew Schultz

The Children's Bach, Op. 74, is a chamber opera by the Australian composer Andrew Schultz to a libretto by Glenn Perry, based on the 1984 novella of the same name by Helen Garner. The work was commissioned by the Melbourne-based group Chamber Made and their artistic director Douglas Horton with the aid of an Australia Council Project Fellowship; it premiered for a run of 15 performances at the Malthouse Theatre's Merlyn Theatre on 20 June 2008.

The opera was performed and recorded at the 2019 Canberra International Music Festival, conducted by Roland Peelman. The Lyric Opera of Melbourne and Theatre Works gave the work its second full staging in August/September 2024.

== Roles ==
Roles, voice types, premiere cast
Role	Voice type	Premiere cast, 20 June 2008 Conductor: Brett Kelly
Dexter	baritone	Andrea Carcassi
Athena	mezzo-soprano	Kathryn Grey
Billy, their son		Jackson Cairnduff/ James Christensen
Phillip	tenor	James Egglestone
Elizabeth	mezzo-soprano	Dimity Shepherd
Vicki, Elisabeth's sister	soprano	Teresa 'Tess' Duddy
Poppy, Phillip's daughter		Hannah Kostros/ Alexa Madden
Director		Chris Kohn
Lighting design		Richard Vabre
Design		Dale Ferguson
Sound design		Russell Goldsmith

The work is of 80 minutes duration and is scored for a cast of six, and six instrumentalists (violin, cello, double bass, clarinet, percussion, piano).

== Synopsis ==
The Children’s Bach is a contemporary story set on the banks of Merri Creek in inner-suburban Melbourne. Dexter and Athena live in a ramshackle house with no TV and an outside loo. But they are comfortably happy although life with their disabled son, Billy, has taken its toll. Against this family crashes another; Phillip, Elizabeth and Vicki: urbane, musical and stylish. And like most crashes there’s collateral damage.

— from the program notes
