= Samuel Perry =

Samuel or Sam Perry may refer to:

- Samuel Perry (MP) (1877–1954), Labour Co-operative politician in the United Kingdom
- Samuel Augustus Perry (1787–1854), English-born soldier and surveyor
- Samuel Marshall Perry (1836–1898), early Los Angeles councilman
- Samuel Perry (ironmaster) (1864–1930), founder of Perry Engineering of South Australia
- Sam Perry (composer) (1884–1936), musician and composer of scores of films such as The Last Performance, The Jade Box and The Spell of the Circus
- Sam Perry (swimmer) (born 1995), New Zealand swimmer
- Sam Perry (looping artist) (born 1989), won the seventh series of The Voice Australia
- Sam Perry (footballer) (born 2001), English footballer
- Samuel Victor Perry (1918–2009), English biochemist
- Samuel E. Perry (born 1969), professor of East Asian Studies at Brown University
- Sam Perry (rugby league), Australian rugby league player
- Sam Perry (sprinter) (born 1945), winner of the 60 yards at the 1965 USA Indoor Track and Field Championships
- Samuel L. Perry (born 1980), sociology professor at University of Oklahoma
