= Barbara Perry =

Barbara Perry may refer to:

- Barbara Perry (actress) (1921–2019), American actress
- Barbara Perry (criminologist) (born 1962), Canadian criminologist
- Barbara Perry (politician) (born 1964), Australian politician
- Barbara A. Perry, American academic
- Barbara Perry (volleyball) (1945–2026), played for the U.S. national team
