= Charles R. Perry =

American businessman in the construction industry

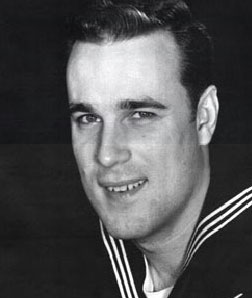
- Perry during his service in the U.S. Navy
- Born: January 21, 1934; Florida, United States
- Died: May 10, 2005 (aged 71); Dresden, Germany
- Other name: Chuck Perry
- Education: University of Florida
- Occupation: Businessman

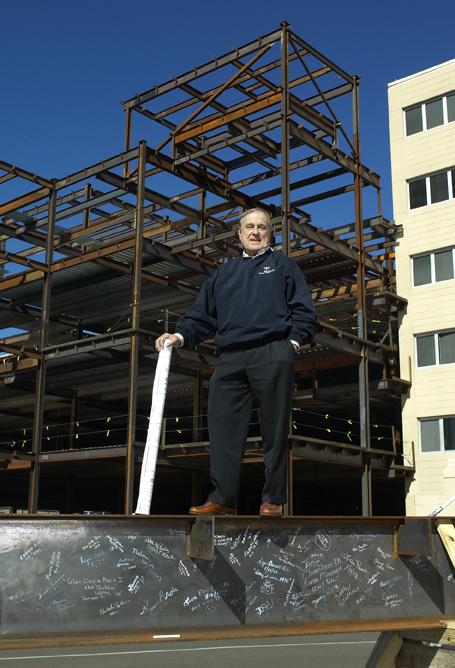
Perry standing on a signed beam at a construction site.

Charles R. "Chuck" Perry (January 21, 1934 – May 10, 2005) was an American businessman and philanthropist who was a construction industry leader in Gainesville, Florida. He died of a heart attack in 2005 while on vacation in Dresden, Germany.

== Early life and military service ==
In 1954 Perry left his home in Winter Park, Florida to attend the University of Florida. His college years were interrupted by his service in the United States Navy. In 1960 he earned a bachelor's degree in building construction from the University of Florida.

== Career ==
Perry founded Charles Perry Construction in 1968. He was instrumental in the construction of numerous Gainesville landmarks, including the downtown public library, the former and current Alachua County, Florida courthouses, North Florida Regional Medical Center, and many buildings at the University of Florida and at Santa Fe College.

Perry developed liaisons with local education leaders to advance education in construction crafts and trades. His company completed three institutions in his honor: in 2007, the Charles R. Perry Construction Yard at the University of Florida M. E. Rinker, Sr. School of Building Construction; in 2009, the Charles R. Perry Construction Institute at Santa Fe College's School of Construction, and the Charles R. and Nancy V. Perry Center for Emerging Technologies for Santa Fe College's Laboratory Technology Programs.

Perry started PPI Construction Management in 1993 to better serve the needs of his clients, many of whom were favoring the construction management delivery method over standard hard bid.

== Death and legacy ==
Perry remained active in both companies until his death. In 2011, his surviving partners, Breck A. Weingart, John V. Carlson, Domenic E. Scorpio and Brian K. Leslie, united the individual operations of Charles Perry Construction and PPI Construction Management to better serve their diverse client base. When the partners consolidate the two companies, they honored Perry's legacy by naming the new company Charles Perry Partners, Inc.
