= Andrew Perry (Hampshire cricketer) =

English cricketer (born 1976)

Personal information
- Full name: Andrew Howard Dawson Perry
- Born: 2 July 1976 (age 50); Portsmouth, Hampshire, England
- Nickname: Peza
- Batting: Right-handed
- Bowling: Right-arm off break

Domestic team information
- Years: Team
- 1999–2002: Hampshire Cricket Board

Career statistics
Competition	List A
Matches	6
Runs scored	41
Batting average	8.20
100s/50s	0/0
Top score	89
Catches/stumpings	1/–
- Source: Cricinfo, 28 December 2009

Andrew Howard Dawson Perry (born 2 July 1976) is a former English cricketer. Perry was a right-handed batsman who bowled right-arm off break. He was born at Portsmouth in Hampshire in 1976.

Perry made his List A debut for the Hampshire Cricket Board in the 1999 NatWest Trophy against the Suffolk. Perry played in six List A matches for the Hampshire Cricket Board, the last of which came in the 2nd round of 2003 Cheltenham and Gloucester Trophy which was played in 2002 against Staffordshire.

Perry played six Second Eleven Championship matches in 2000 for the Hampshire Second XI.
