= Walter Berry =

Walter Berry may refer to:

- Walter Berry (bass-baritone) (1929–2000), Austrian opera singer
- Walter Berry (basketball) (born 1964), American former professional basketball player
- Walter Berry (politician), Canadian speaker of the legislative assembly of Prince Edward Island from 1780 to 1784
- Walter Van Rensselaer Berry (1859–1927), American lawyer, diplomat, tennis player

== See also ==
- Lyall Berry (1893–1970), Australian cricketer, born Walter Lyall Berry
