= Joseph Berryer =

Belgian diplomat

Viscount Joseph (Joë) Marie Clément Guillaume Berryer (Liège, 9 March 1897 – Knokke, 1 September 1978) was a Belgian diplomat.

== Family ==
Joseph Berryer, issue of the Berryer family, was one of five children of Catholic Minister and Senator Paul Berryer (1868–1936) and of Géraldine Dallemagne (1873–1957).

== Tokyo ==
In 1922 he became a Secretary at the Belgian Embassy in Tokyo, where he married Ghislaine de Bassompierre (1904–1978), daughter of Ambassador Baron Albert de Bassompierre. They had a daughter and three sons.

== Madrid during the civil war ==
On 15 September 1934 he became the Belgian consul in Madrid. On 8 August 1936, at the start of the Spanish Civil War, the Belgian Ambassador Robert Everts left Madrid for Saint-Jean-de-Luz. Berryer stayed in Madrid and motivated the Belgian government to recognise the Bando nacional. He hid several people in the embassy who threatened communists such as the archbishop of Madrid and banker Luis Urquijo, marquess of Bolarque. He helped people by letting them escape through the frontlines to Valencia. On 29 December 1936, Jacques de Borchgrave, son of diplomat Roger de Borchgrave, was shot dead by the Republicans in a ditch 5 kilometres away from Fuencarral. Berryer declared that Jacques de Borchgrave was an attaché and demanded clarifications and reparations from Francisco Largo Caballero. Spain refused to recognise de Borchgrave as a member of the diplomatic staff.

== Berlin ==
On 28 July 1937, Berryer was sent to the Belgian embassy in Berlin. He stayed there until May 1940, the start of the Second World War for Belgium.

== Go-between ==
After Belgium's surrender, Berryer found himself somewhere in the vicinity of the Belgian government in Poitiers and, afterwards, Vichy and Sauveterre-de-Guyenne. He was sent to Bern in the beginning of June 1940 to start negotiations with king Leopold III of Belgium's chef de cabinet Louis Fredericq. He drafted a report, in line with his intentions to advance relations between the king and his government. King Leopold III was not satisfied with the passage that the king morally supported the government. Fredericq, as well, had to contradict the report. In the long term, Berryer's report would be instrumentalised during the Royal Question (including by Jacques Pirenne) to show that the king wanted to continue the war early on.

At the start of July 1940, Berryer was charged with a new mission. He travelled to Brussels and contacted the king's cabinet. He had two meetings with Leopold III, who told him that he could not contact the Belgian government in exile and Berryer had to let the government know that no contact could be established. The king and his cabinet did not accept the government's authority anymore.

After the departure of the most important government members to London, Berryer returned to Belgium. He became part of a small number of diplomats that, under the lead of Pierre van Zuylen and Jacques Davignon, advocated the maintenance of a Department of Foreign Affairs to the occupying forces. Berryer negotiated with Werner von Bargen, the diplomatic assistant of Alexander von Falkenhausen. An approval of the proposal would have led to collaboration with Nazi Germany. The Department of Foreign Affairs, however, was disbanded and their proposal refused.

== Luxembourg and Holy See ==
Contrary to his colleagues who stayed in Belgium during the war or lost the confidence of the government-in-exile like Pierre van Zuylen, Robert Capelle, Louis d'Ursel, Jacques Davignon and others, Berryer could continue his career as a diplomat.

From 1945 to 1953, he was the Ambassador in Luxemburg. and from 1953 to 1957 at the Holy See.

== Madrid ==
From 4 April 1957 to 1964, he returned to Madrid, now as an Ambassador. He was involved with the preparations of the marriage of king Baudouin of Belgium with Fabiola de Mora y Aragón and the granting of asylum to Moïse Tshombe in Spain.

== Literature ==
- Camille Gutt, La Belgique au Carrefour, 1940–1944, Paris, Fayard, 1971.
- Oscar Coomans de Brachène, État présent de la noblesse belge, Annuaire 1984, Brussels, 1984.
- Jan Velaers & Herman Van Goethem, Leopold III. De Koning, het Land, de Oorlog, Tielt, Lannoo, 1994.
- Pierre d'Ydewalle, Mémoires, 1912–1940, Tielt, Lannoo, 1994.
