= Lorinda Perry =

American economist

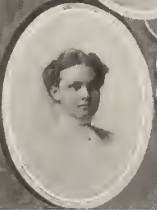
- Lorinda Perry, from a 1910 University of Illinois yearbook.
- Born: December 23, 1884; Melvin, Illinois
- Died: August 30, 1951; Chicago, Illinois
- Occupation(s): economist, college professor, lawyer
- Notable work: Millinery as a Trade for Women (1916)

Lorinda Perry (December 23, 1884 – August 30, 1951) was an American economist, college professor, and lawyer, based most of her life in Illinois.

== Early life ==
Perry was born December 21, 1884, in Melvin, Illinois, the daughter of Eugene Beauharnais Perry and Elizabeth Wilson Perry. Her father was a Union Army veteran of the American Civil War, and a medical doctor; her mother was born in Scotland.

Perry trained as a teacher at Illinois State Normal University from 1900 to 1904, and graduated from the University of Illinois in 1909. She earned her master's degree at Illinois in 1910, with a thesis titled "The history of the lake shipping trade of Chicago". In 1910, she held a fellowship in the Department of Research of the Women's Educational and Industrial Union, and from 1911 to 1913, she was a graduate student at Bryn Mawr College. Her fellowship research focused on the millinery trade in Philadelphia and Boston; she earned her doctorate in 1913, under the supervision of Marion Parris Smith and Susan Myra Kingsbury. Her study was later published as Millinery as a Trade for Women (1916).

== Career ==
Lorinda Perry was head of the department of political and social sciences at Rockford College from 1914 to 1916, and taught in the household science department at the University of Illinois from 1916 to 1919. She spoke on women's work during World War I, saying "Statistics prove that the war has caused one and a quarter million women to be added to the number previously in industry in England," but that their wages did not match those of the men who held the same jobs before the war. She also organized household science students to make and donate garments to the Red Cross for French war refugees. She helped to establish the Rockford College Club and the University Woman's Club at the University of Illinois. Beyond campus, Perry taught a course in "household accounting" to the members of the Home Improvement Association of Champaign, and at the YWCA in Decatur.

In 1919, Perry taught in Chicago. In 1920 she became a professor of economics at Hunter College in New York. Later in life, she attended law school at the University of Chicago, earned a Juris Doctor degree, and was a member of the Illinois State Bar Association. "Miss Perry was interested always in her community, and was courageous, intelligent, and honorable in her handling of the problems she met, never compromising with principle," recalled one obituary in 1951.

== Personal life ==
In 1940, Perry was single and living in Chicago with her single siblings Benjamin, Josephine, Elizabeth, and Eugene. Benjamin and Eugene were medical doctors; Elizabeth was a lawyer, and Josephine served in the Illinois General Assembly. Lorinda Perry died August 30, 1951, aged 66 years, in Chicago; her gravesite was in Gibson City, Illinois.

== Publications ==
- The history of the lake shipping trade of Chicago, 1910
- Millinery as a trade for women, 1916
- The millinery trade in Boston and Philadelphia : a study of women in industry, 1916
