= Juliana Hodkinson =

British composer

Juliana Hodkinson (born Exeter, 17 March 1971) is a British composer, based in Berlin and associated with contemporary classical music in Denmark. She is known for works that combine acoustic instruments, electronics, field recordings and installation and visual elements.

In 2015, she was recipient of the Honorary Award by the Carl Nielsen and Anne Marie Carl-Nielsen Foundation, and also won the Stuttgart Composition Prize in 2017.

== Education and move to Denmark and Germany ==
After growing up in Devon, Hodkinson studied musicology and philosophy at King's College, Cambridge and Japanese Studies at the University of Sheffield. She moved to Denmark and studied composition with Per Nørgård and Hans Abrahamsen in 1993, before completing a PhD at the University of Copenhagen on the subject of silence in music and sound art in 2007. She subsequently taught composition at the University of Copenhagen, Royal Danish Academy of Music, Technische Universität Berlin, the Academy of Music and Drama at the University of Gothenburg and at the Royal Academy of Music in Aarhus. Hodkinson has lived in Berlin since 2009.

== Music ==
Hodkinson’s music has been commissioned from ensembles and festivals including the Borealis Festival, the BBC Scottish Symphony Orchestra, SWR Symphonieorchester, the SPOR Festival in Aarhus, the Darmstadt Summer Course and the London Sinfonietta.

Her major works include Angel View (2014), a semi-staged theatre piece for the ensemble Scenatet, a chamber opera, Turbulence (2013), a collaborative work with composer Niels Rønsholdt, Fish & Fowl (2011), and Lightness (2015), for percussion trio and amplified matches.

She has formerly chaired the Danish Arts Foundation and its music panels and has been a board member at the Danish Composers' Union.

Hodkinson's music is published by Edition Wilhelm Hansen.
