= Tom Perry =

Tom Perry is the name of:

- L. Tom Perry (1922–2015), American businessman and religious leader
- Tom Perry (politician), Canadian politician and medical doctor
- Tom Perry (footballer) (1871–1927), England international footballer
- Tom Perry (Businessman) (Born 1970), Owner of Sherpa Marketing Ltd
- Tom Perry (speedway rider) (born 1993), British speedway and grasstrack rider

== See also ==
- Lee Tom Perry (born 1951), business professor, Mormon leader, and hymnwriter
- Tommy Perry (born 1980), American football coach
- Thomas Perry (disambiguation)
