= Fred Perry (disambiguation) =

Fred Perry (1909–1995) was a British tennis player and originator of the clothing line.

Fred Perry may also refer to:

- Fred Perry (clothing label)
- Fred Perry (boxer) (1904-1981), British Olympic boxer
- Fred Perry (comics) (born 1969), American comic artist
- Fred Perry (Canadian football) (born 1975), American player of Canadian football
- Fred Perry (footballer) (1933–2016), English footballer

== See also ==
- Perry (surname)
