= Joseph Perry =

Joe or Joseph Perry may refer to:

- Joseph Perry (cinematographer) (1863–1943), English-Australian pioneer filmmaker
- Joseph Sam Perry (1896–1984), American district court judge
- Joe Perry (American football) (1927–2011), American fullback
- Joseph V. Perry (1931–2000), American film and television actor a/k/a Joe Perry
- Joseph N. Perry (born 1948), American Roman Catholic bishop of Chicago
- Joe Perry (musician) (born 1950), American guitarist and singer with Aerosmith
  - Joe Perry (album), 2005 solo album
- Joe Perry (politician) (born 1966), American legislator from Maine
- Joe Perry (snooker player) (born 1974), English Triple Crown finalist

== See also ==
- Joel Perry (born 1985), Australian rules footballer in AFL
- Joseph Berry (disambiguation)
