= Thomas Perry =

Thomas Perry may refer to:

== Politics ==
- Thomas C. Perry (1941–2017), American politician and president of Perry's Ice Cream
- Thomas Erskine Perry (1806–1913), British Liberal politician and judge in India
- Thomas J. Perry (1807–1871), congressman from Maryland
- Thomas Perry (Australian politician) (1914–1998)

== Other ==
- Thomas Perry (luthier) (1738–1818), Irish violin maker
- Thomas Sergeant Perry (1845–1928), American editor, critic, translator, and historian
- Thomas O. Perry (1847–1927), American mechanical engineer in wind power
- Thomas Perry (priest) (1908–1989), Irish dean of Clonmacnoise, 1961–1979
- Thomas Perry (author) (1947–2025), American mystery novelist
- Thomas Perry (American football) (born 2003), American college football offensive tackle

== See also ==
- Tom Perry (disambiguation)
