= Scott Perry (disambiguation) =

Scott Perry (born 1962) is a U.S. representative from Pennsylvania.

Scott Perry may also refer to:

- Scott Perry (American football) (born 1954), American football player
- Scott Perry (baseball) (1891–1959), baseball player
- Scott Perry (basketball) (born 1963), NBA executive
- Scott Perry, a character from the TV series Council of Dads
