= John Perry =

John Perry may refer to:

== Politicians ==
- John Perry (1845–1922), Australian politician, member for Richmond, Ballina and Byron
- John Perry (1849–1935), Australian politician, member for Liverpool Plains
- John Perry (Irish politician) (born 1956), Irish politician
- John Perry (MP) (c. 1630–1732), English politician, MP for New Shoreham
- John C. Perry (1832–1884), New York politician, and Wyoming Chief Justice
- John D. Perry (born c. 1935), New York state senator
- John Hoyt Perry (1848–1928), American lawyer, judge and politician
- John J. Perry (1811–1897), U.S. Representative from Maine
- John R. Perry (judge) (born 1954), Wyoming judge and politician
- John Perry (Australian judge) (1937–2007), on List of judges of the Supreme Court of South Australia

== Sportspeople ==
- John Perry (footballer) (born 1945), Australian football player
- Pete Perry (basketball) (John Perry, born 1948), American basketball player
- John Perry (American football, born 1950), American football coach
- John Perry (American football, born 1969), American football coach
- Johnny Perry (1972–2002), American strongman competitor
- John Perry (runner), winner of the 1965 and 1966 4 × 880 yard relay at the NCAA Division I Indoor Track and Field Championships

== Others ==
- John Perry (musician) (born 1952), English musician, guitarist with The Only Ones
- John G. Perry (born 1947), English bass guitarist with Quantum Jump
- John Perry (philosopher) (born 1943), American philosopher
- John Bennett Perry (born 1941), American actor
- John Perry (bishop) (born 1935), Anglican Bishop of Southampton and Chelmsford
- John Curtis Perry (1930–2025), East Asian and Oceanic studies professor
- John R. Perry (admiral) (1899–1955), U.S. Rear Admiral, Pacific Fleet, World War II
- John Perry (engineer) (1850–1920), Irish engineer
- John R. Perry (orientalist) (born 1942), American linguist and orientalist
- John Perry (shipbuilder) (1743–1810), British ship builder
- John Perry (priest) (1920–2017), Archdeacon of Middlesex
- John Perry, English singer, member of Grapefruit and Tony Rivers and the Castaways
- John Perry, playwright who collaborated with M. J. Farrell
- John Perry, the protagonist in the novel Old Man's War by John Scalzi

== See also ==
- Jack Perry (disambiguation)
- John Parry (disambiguation)
