= Chris Perry =

Chris Perry may refer to:

== Sports ==
- Chris Perry (Australian footballer) (born 1958), Australian rules footballer
- Chris Perry (American football) (born 1982), American football player
- Chris Perry (English footballer) (born 1973), English association football player
- Chris Perry (golfer) (born 1961), American golfer
- Chris Perry (runner) (born 1940), English runner

== Others ==
- Chris Perry (musician) (1928–2002), Indian composer and songwriter
- Christopher Raymond Perry (1761–1818), American naval officer
- Christopher J. Perry (1854–1921), American businessman, politician, civil rights activist and newspaper founder

== See also ==
- Christina Perri (born 1986), American singer
- Chris Parry (disambiguation)
