= George Perry =

George Perry may refer to:

- George Perry (composer) (1793–1862), English composer
- George Perry (engineer) (1719–1771), English engineer, ironmaster, draughtsman and cartographer
- George Perry (Ontario politician) (1818–1891), Ontario MPP
- George Perry (naturalist) (1771–?), English naturalist
- George Perry (neuroscientist) (born 1953), American neuroscientist
- George Perry (priest) (1820–1897), English churchman and historian
- George Perry (British politician) (1920–1998), British Labour MP
- George Perry (American economist) (born 1934), American macroeconomist
- George "Chocolate" Perry, American bassist, producer and sound mixer
- George Sessions Perry (1910–1956), American novelist, World War II correspondent and magazine contributor
