= Michael Perry (gardener) =

TV gardener and author

Michael Perry is an English celebrity gardener and podcast presenter. He presents a show, Michael Perry’s Garden, on QVC UK, and has appeared on ITV1’s This Morning and Channel 4's Steph's Packed Lunch.

Perry maintains a horticultural blog and co-presents The Plant Based Podcast. He is a regular speaker at RHS flower shows, horticultural summits and BBC Gardener's World Live as well as presenting his Weird & Wacky Plants Tour showcasing unusual plants. In 2015, he was listed in The Sunday Times’ Top 20 Most Influential People in the Gardening World.

== Education and early career ==
Perry enjoyed a career as a new product development manager at Thompson & Morgan, where he was credited for developing the 'egg and chips' plant, a grafted plant that produces aubergines and potatoes.

== Media work ==
Some of Perry’s first television appearances included The Alan Titchmarsh Show, Loose Women and Great British Garden Revival. More recently, Perry has been an occasional gardening guest on ITV’s This Morning and Channel 4's Steph's Packed Lunch.

In 2010, Perry began presenting gardening products on QVC. He later became a regular gardening expert on the channel. He presents Michael Perry’s Garden, with his own curated range of products and editorial.

Perry co-presents The Plant Based Podcast with Ellen Mary, a gardening influencer.

In 2022, Perry hosted a 'plant dating' pop-up at the Lucky Club Mayfair, in collaboration with The Joy of Plants. Attendees were given the chance to find a houseplant that matched their lifestyle, before taking it home.

=== Awards ===
The website Mr Plant Geek was awarded a Gold Award at the 2019 and 2022 GardenComm horticultural press awards. The Garden Media Guild named Perry as Social Media Influencer of the Year in 2020.

=== Charity work ===
Perry regularly participates in charity work, including his annual appearances in a nude calendar for the benefit of charity Perennial, with a fundraising team named The Grubby Gardeners. In his local area of East Anglia, he has worked with the charity ActivLives to renew flower beds in urban areas. He champions gardening for mental health and wellbeing,

== Writing career ==
In 2022, Perry published his debut book Hortus Curious under publisher DK.
