= Jason Perry (arena football) =

American football player (born 1984)

No. 11
- Position: Defensive back

Personal information
- Born: September 24, 1984 (age 42); Cleveland, Ohio
- Listed height: 5 ft 8 in (1.73 m)
- Listed weight: 175 lb (79 kg)

Career information
- High school: Bedford (OH) St. Peter Chanel
- College: Youngstown State
- NFL draft: 2007: undrafted

Career history
- Orlando Predators (2008); Jacksonville Sharks (2010)

Awards and highlights
- Second Team All-MVFC (2005)

Career AFL statistics
- Tackles: 118
- Pass Breakups: 23
- Forced fumbles: 1
- Fumble recoveries: 2
- Interceptions: 5
- Stats at ArenaFan.com

Jason Perry (born September 24, 1984 in Cleveland, Ohio) is an American former football player. He played defensive back for Youngstown State. He was signed as a free agent by the Jacksonville Sharks in 2009.
