= Jonathan Perry =

Jonathan Perry may refer to:

- Jonathan Perry (footballer) (born 1976), New Zealand association football player
- Jonathan Perry (cricketer) (born 1965), former English cricketer
- Jonathan Perry (politician) (born 1973), Republican member of the Louisiana State Senate
- J. Perry (born 1988), Jonathan Perry, Haitian singer, songwriter, and composer
