= Peter Perry =

Peter or Pete Perry may refer to:

- Peter Perry (colonialist) (1873–1935), British colonial employee
- Peter Perry (footballer) (1936–2011), English footballer
- Peter Perry (politician) (1792–1851), Canadian politician
- Peter E. Perry (1901–1993), American politician
- Pete Perry (activist) (born 1969), American peace and social justice activist
- Pete Perry (basketball) (born 1948), American basketball player
