= Charles Elliott Perry =

New Zealand Anglican clergyman

Charles Elliott Perry (1871–1937) was a New Zealand Anglican clergyman. He was born in Melbourne, Victoria, Australia in 1871. He served as vicar of the Church of St Michael and All Angels Anglican church, Christchurch, New Zealand from 1916 to 1936.
