= Josephine Perry =

American educator, secretary, and politician

Josephine Perry (December 14, 1881 – May 15, 1943) was an American educator, secretary, and politician.

Perry was born in Melvin, Illinois, the daughter of Eugene Beauharnais Perry and Elizabeth Wilson Perry. Her father was a Union Army veteran of the American Civil War and a medical doctor; her mother was born in Scotland. She received her bachelor's degree from Illinois State University. She served as assistant principal of Loda High School in Loda, Illinois, in 1905. She worked as an apprenticed pharmacist, in Melvin, Illinois, and did secretarial work. She moved to Chicago, Illinois with her family. Perry served in the Illinois House of Representatives from 1931 to 1935 and was a Republican. Perry died at Wesley Memorial Hospital in Chicago, Illinois.

Her younger sister Lorinda Perry (1884-1951) was an economist, a professor at the University of Illinois, and later a lawyer.
