= Glenn Perry =

Australian writer and opera librettist

Glenn Perry is an Australian writer and opera librettist.

He is notable for his librettos for Julian Yu's operas Fresh Ghosts (1997) and The Possessed (2003). Perry received a grant in 2002 from the Australia Council for the writing of The Obsessed. He wrote the libretto for the operatic version of Helen Garner's novella The Children's Bach. For this work, Perry received the 2007 RE Ross Trust Playwrights' Script Development Award.

He has also adapted Australian children's author Morris Gleitzman's book Second Childhood for the stage.

In 2012, he adapted Dostoevsky’s The Gambler into a radio drama The Roulettenburg.

He currently teaches English as a Second Language at Monash College.
