= Geoffrey Perry =

British physics professor and astronomer (1927–2000)

Geoffrey E. Perry MBE (4 August 1927, Braintree, Essex – 18 January 2000, Bude) was a physics teacher at Kettering Grammar School, Northamptonshire, England who, together with his colleague Derek Slater, and students, deduced the existence of the previously-secret Plesetsk Cosmodrome in 1966 by analyzing the orbit of the Kosmos 112 satellite. The New York Times published his discovery shortly before Christmas in 1966.

Perry and his students (who formed the Kettering Group along with some other volunteers worldwide) continued their satellite tracking work for a number of years, using only inexpensive shortwave radio equipment and painstakingly using the Doppler effect to deduce the satellites' orbits. They were often able to deduce what various Soviet satellites were being used for, based on their telemetry. This information was likely already known by Western intelligence agencies, although it was classified, meaning that the Kettering Group played an important role in making information about the Soviet space programme publicly available.

Perry received an MBE in 1973, in the New Year Honours List. In 1974, he received the Jackson-Gwilt Medal of the Royal Astronomical Society. After retiring from teaching in 1984 he worked as a space analyst for the ITN television network. He was married to Jean, and had a daughter, Isabel.
