= Jack Parry =

Jack Parry may refer to:

- Jack Parry (Welsh footballer) (1924–2010), Welsh footballer
- Jack Parry (English footballer) (1931–2022), English footballer
