= John Holliday Perry Sr. =

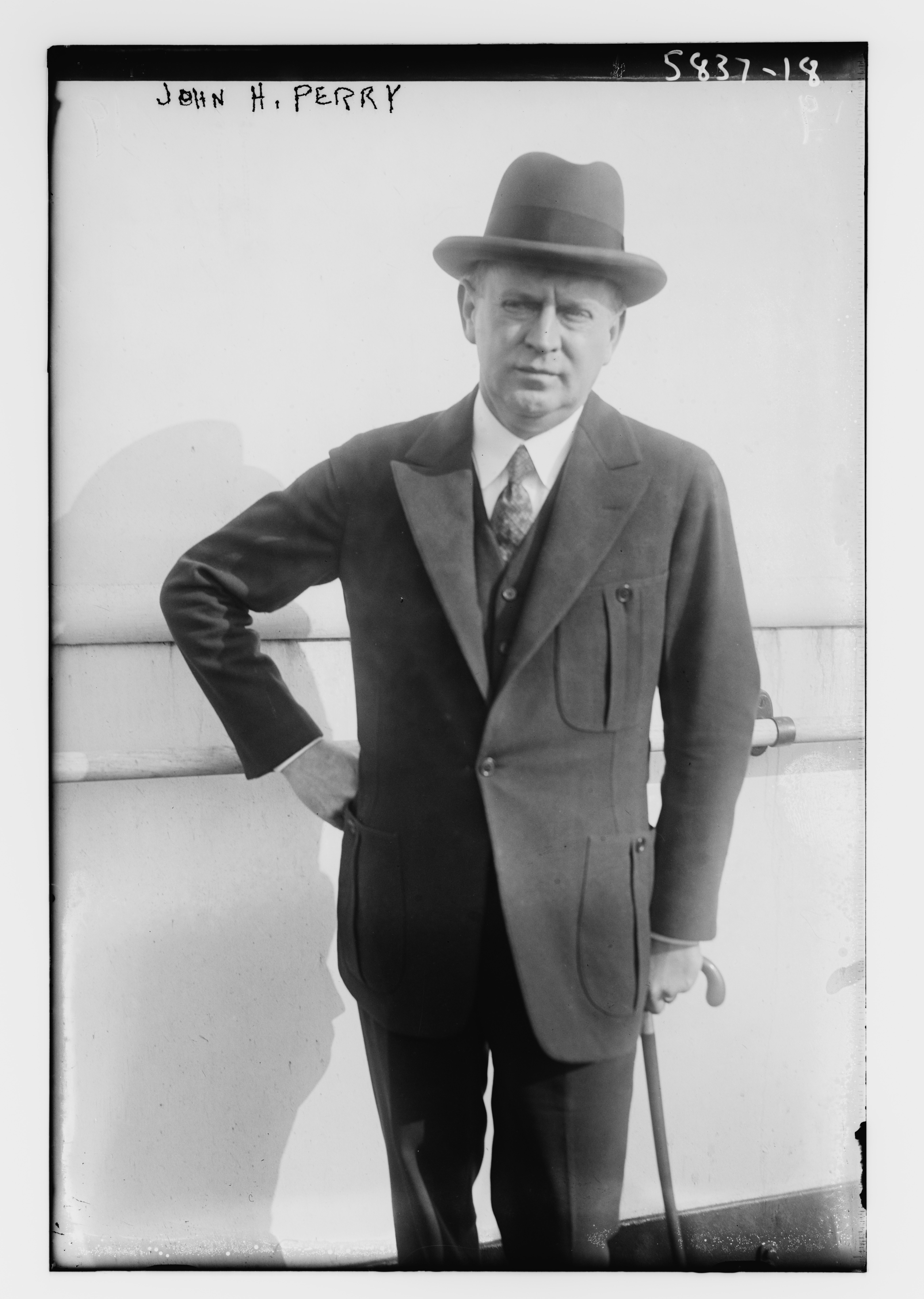
John H. Perry in 1920s

John Holliday Perry Sr. (March 3, 1881 – December 4, 1952) was a lawyer for newspaper organizations who eventually acquired more than two dozen newspapers including the Jacksonville Journal, Pensacola Journal, Fernandina News-Leader and radio stations. His newspaper holdings in Florida also included the Palm Beach Post.

He was born in Kentucky. He received his law degree from the University of Virginia. He lived in Palm Beach, Florida.

In August 1952, he got ill while he was visiting Paris. He died at the Good Samaritan Hospital in West Palm Beach, Florida on December 4, 1952, at the age of 71.

In 1987, he was posthumously described as "one of America's greatest publishers" by the Jacksonville Journal. His son John Holliday Perry Jr. sold 27 newspapers to Cox.
